= Railway Heritage Park, Tinsukia =

Railway museum in Assam, India

Coordinates: 27.4803°N 95.3351°E

The Railway Heritage Park is a railway museum at New Tinsukia Junction railway station, in Assam, India, opened in 2010. The museum is bordered by National Highway 37.

The open-air museum was designed for children to play, and is themed around three historic railways in the Northeast Frontier Railway zone—the Assam Bengal Railway (ABR), Dibru–Sadiya Railway (DSR) and Darjeeling Himalayan Railway (DHR).

The creation of the museum was inspired by a visit the Oil Centenary Museum at Digboi in 2008.

== Rolling stock ==
Gauge	Number	Type	Names	Built	Builder	Notes
1000	2230	TSK RA Inspection car				
1000	2298	TSK CZACEN Saloon				
1000		MWGX Garratt steam locomotive	Hercules		Beyer, Peacock & Company	Bengal Assam Railway
1000	2618	YP steam locomotive	Joymati	1957-07-15	Chittaranjan Locomotive Works	Hauled the final meter gauge service (262DN, Lido‒Tinsuki) on 21 January 1997 (or 21 February 1997).
1000	6144	YDM-4 diesel locomotive		1964	American Locomotive Company	
600	27	DHR Carriage I	Rangeet	1967/1968	Gorakhpur	First class chair car "FCZ-27". Plinthed^{(under cover)} inside a replica DHR station (2010‒).
600	148	DHR Carriage II	Tsokha			Second class chair car "SCZ 148". Plinthed^{(under cover)} on a railway turntable (2010‒).
600	781	DHR B Class steam locomotive		1899	Sharp, Stewart & Company	Darjeeling Himalayan Railway (DHR) (1899‒1968). Sold to North Eastern Coalfields, Tipong Colliery (1968‒2010). Donated by Coal India and plinthed at Railway Heritage Park, Tinsukia, Assam (2010‒) on top of two Assam Bengal Railway bridge pillars (dated 1898) in middle of water island.
