= New Tinsukia Junction railway station =

Railway station in Assam, India

New Tinsukia Junction

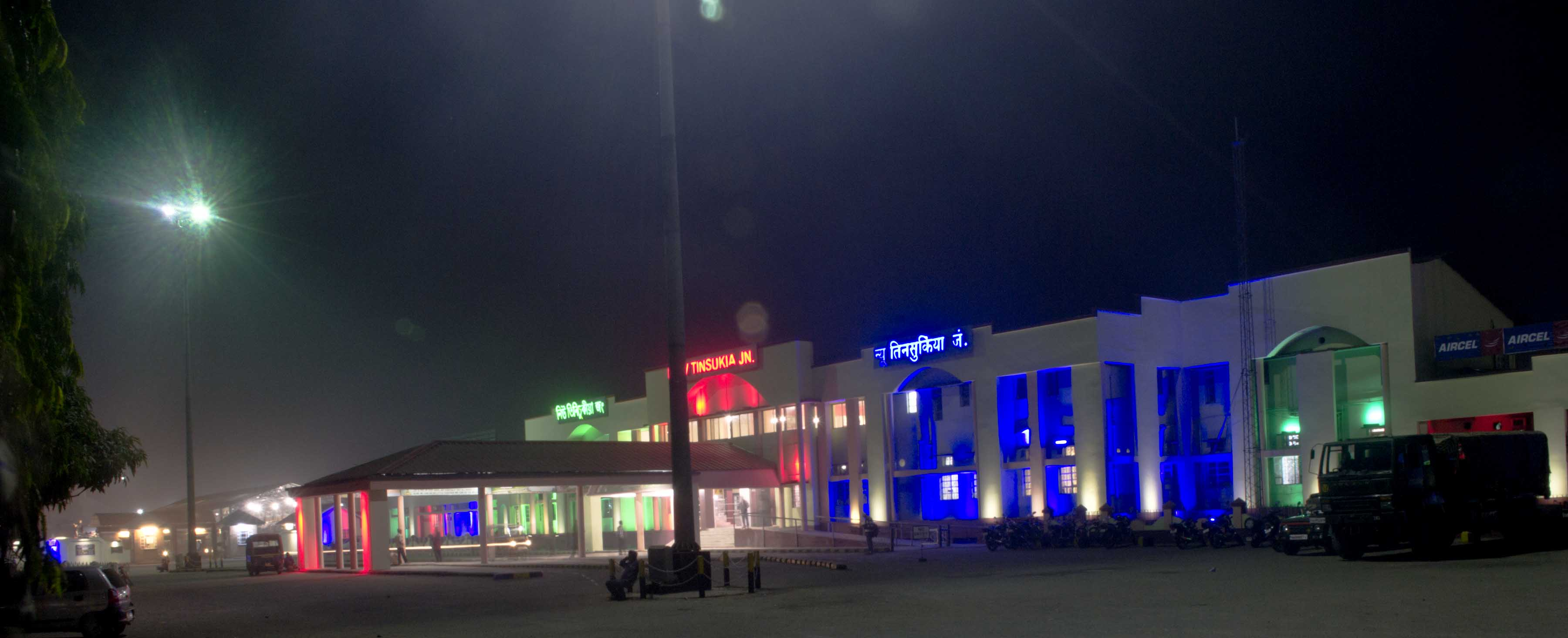
- New Tinsukia Railway Station Complex

General information
- Location: Assam Trunk Road, Hijuguri, Tinsukia-786192, Assam; India
- Coordinates: 27°28′47″N 95°20′02″E
- Elevation: 124 metres (407 ft)
- System: Regional rail and Commuter rail station
- Owner: Indian Railways
- Operator: Northeast Frontier Railway
- Lines: Lumding–Dibrugarh section; Dibrugarh Town-Tinsukia-Ledo/Dangri section
- Platforms: 3
- Tracks: 10
- Connections: Auto-rickshaw, Bus Stand

Construction
- Structure type: At grade
- Parking: Available
- Cycle facilities: Available
- Accessible: Yes

Other information
- Status: Functioning
- Station code: NTSK
- Zone(s): Northeast Frontier
- Division(s): Tinsukia

History
- Opened: 1883
- Former names: Dibru-Sadiya Railway

Passengers
- 30K/Day (▲ high)

Services
Location
- Location within Assam

New Tinsukia is a railway junction station on the Lumding–Dibrugarh section. It is located in Tinsukia district in the Indian state of Assam. It serves Tinsukia and the surrounding areas. New Tinsukia is the second station in the town of Tinsukia after the old Tinsukia Station. The Railway Heritage Park, Tinsukia is located at the station, with locomotives from the Darjeeling Himalayan Railway (DHR), Dibru–Sadiya Railway (DSR) and Assam Bengal Railway (ABR).

== History ==
The 1,000 mm (3 ft 3 3/8 in)-wide metre-gauge line from Dibrugarh steamer ghat to Makum was opened to passenger traffic on 16 July 1883.

The metre-gauge railway track earlier laid by Assam Bengal Railway from Chittagong to Lumding was extended to Tinsukia on the Dibru–Sadiya line in 1903.

The project for the conversion of the Lumding–Dibrugarh section from metre gauge to 5 ft 6 in (1,676 mm) broad gauge was completed by the end of 1997.

== Station amenities ==
Following services available in New Tinsukia Jn. Railway Station:

- 02 (02 Bedded) AC Retiring Rooms with Free Wi-Fi/TV/Locker/Charging point
- 02 (02 Bedded) Non AC Retiring Rooms with Free Wi-Fi/TV/Locker
- 01 (01 Bedded) Non AC Retiring Room with Free Wi-Fi/TV/Locker
- 01 (07 Bedded) Non AC Dormitory with Free Wi-Fi/TV
- ATM
- Paid Executive Lounge cum Food Bar
- High Speed Google Railwire Free Wi-Fi service
- Upper Class/Lower Class Waiting Rooms having Free Wi-Fi/AC/TV/Charging points/Drinking water & separate Ladies/Gents Washrooms
- Food Plaza
- Tea Stall
- FOB with 2X Escalator/Elevators 2X
- CCTV Surveillance
- Cloak Room

== See also ==
- North Eastern Railway Connectivity Project
- North Western Railway zone

Preceding station	Indian Railways	Following station
Sripuriagaon towards ?	Northeast Frontier Railway zone Lumding–Dibrugarh section	Panitola towards ?
Terminus	Northeast Frontier Railway zone New Tinsukia–Dangri branch line and New Tinsukia–Lekhapani branch line	Tinsukia towards ?
