= Dibrugarh =

City in Assam, India

Dibrugarh (Assamese: [dibɹʊ.ɡɔ(ɹ)]) is a city in the Indian state of Assam, located 435 km east of the state capital Dispur. It has been declared as the second administrative capital of Assam and serves as the headquarters of the Dibrugarh district in Upper Assam. Dibrugarh also serves as the headquarters of the Sonowal Kachari Autonomous Council, which is the governing council of the Sonowal Kachari tribe (found predominantly in the district).

== Etymology ==
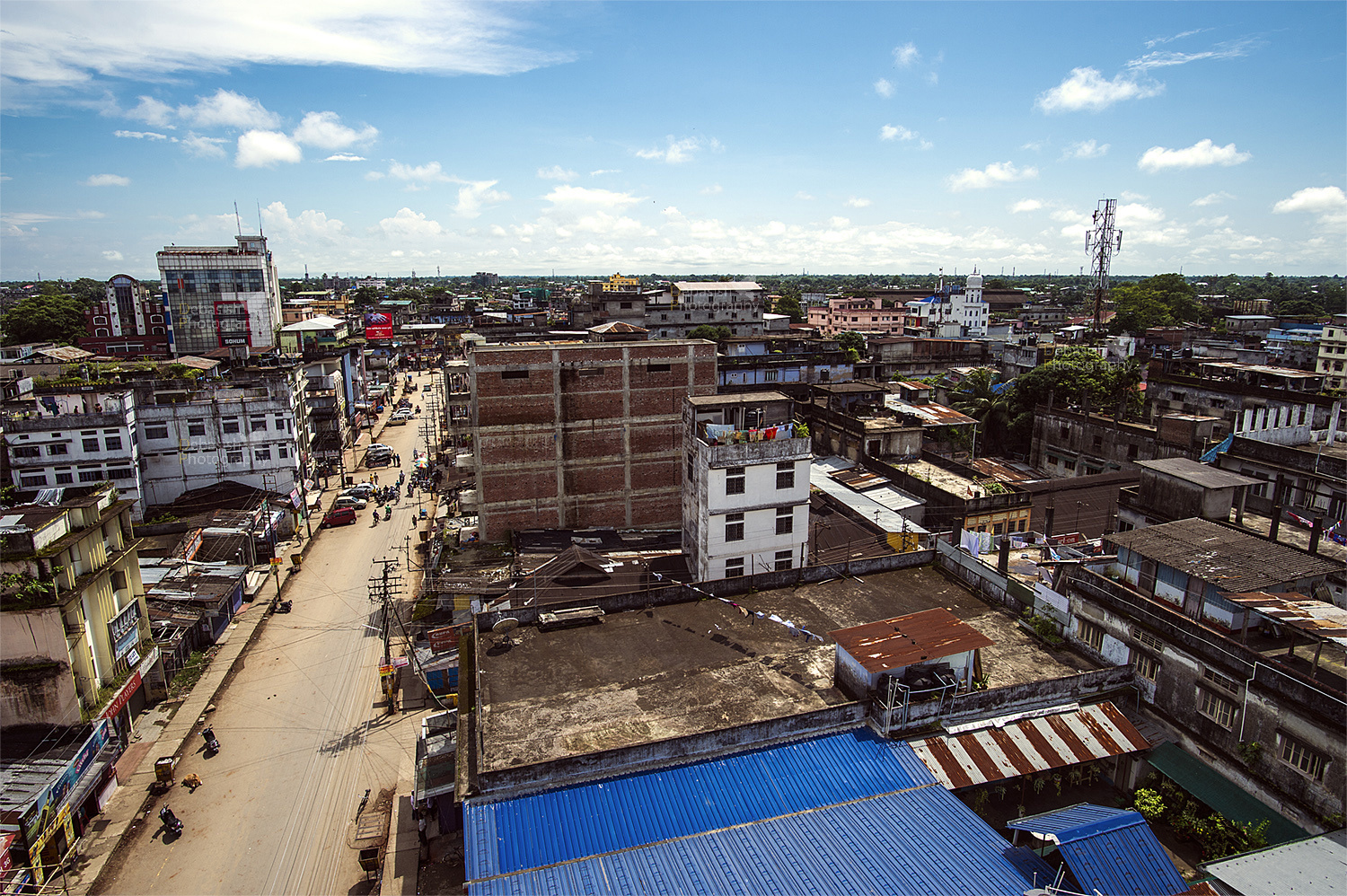
Dibrugarh aerial view

Dibrugarh derived its name from Dibarumukh (as a renowned encampment of Ahoms during their invasion of the Chutia kingdom). The name "Dibru" is associated with the Dibaru or Dibru River. The word is derived from the Tibeto-burman word “Dibru” and “Garh” meaning "fort". The Tibeto-burman Bodo-Kacharis groups add the prefix “Di-” (which means “water”) wherever there is a small stream, a river, or a large river in a town or city. (Note: Cognate words for "water" occur across the Bodo subgroup of Bodo–Garo. Longmailai and Saikia give dɪ in Dimasa, dɯɪ in Bodo, tɪ in Tiwa and Kokborok, and ʤɪ in Deori. Gurdon's 1904 vocabulary also records di "water" in Moran and notes the close relationship of Moran with Kachari, Dimasa and Bodo.)

== History ==
Before the Ahom expansion of the early sixteenth century, the area around present-day Dibrugarh city formed part of the Chutia Kingdom. During the Chutia–Ahom conflicts under Suhungmung, Dibrumukh, at the mouth of the Dibru River, became an important military position. In the final phase of the conflict, Ahom forces under Phrasengmung Borgohain and other commanders established a fort at Dibrumukh, where a Chutia force led by Kasitora, Alangi Chetia and Borpatra was subsequently defeated. Following the conquest of the Chutia kingdom in 1523–24, the area was incorporated into the Ahom kingdom.

Dibru remained a military and administrative centre under the Ahoms; troops from the region are recorded in later Ahom military operations, including a contingent led by the Dibrual Hazarika in Rudra Singha's expedition against the Jaintia Kingdom. During the Moamoria rebellion, following the defeat of the Ahom royal forces at Amaratali in the Dibru region in 1787, the area passed under the control of the Mataks or Moamorias.

After the Yandaboo Accord, the British came to Assam in 1826. They made Dibrugarh an important center of activity by designating it as an administrative and commercial hub in Upper Assam. Dibrugarh was designated as the Lakhimpur District's headquarters in 1842. The town served as both the main military post and a transit camp for Burmese refugees during World War II. The Dibrugarh Sub-Division itself attained full district status in 1971.

The modern town developed under British rule. Following the extension of British administration over the Matak territories, Dibrugarh was selected in the early 1840s as the headquarters of the Lakhimpur district because of its strategic and administrative position in Upper Assam. The British constructed a fort near the Dibru River, around which river-borne trade developed and a market known as Purana Bazar emerged in 1907. After the river damaged the Purana Bazar, a new market was built in 1907. In 1882, railroads connected the town. The Bengal Act V of 1876 established a municipality in Dibrugarh in 1873, and Bengal Act III of 1884 was implemented in 1887. The growth of the tea industry subsequently transformed the town into an important commercial and export centre of Upper Assam.

Transport links further increased its importance. The Assam Railways and Trading Company was formed in 1881 to construct a railway eastwards from Dibrugarh, and railway services on the Dibru–Sadiya Railway began in 1882. By the beginning of the twentieth century, Dibrugarh was an important river and rail terminus through which tea and other products of eastern Assam were exported. The Berry White Medical School was established in the town in 1900, making Dibrugarh an early centre of modern medical education in the region. During the Second World War, Dibrugarh also served as an important military base and as a transit centre for evacuees arriving from Burma.

Soon after Indian independence, the Berry White Medical School was upgraded to Assam Medical College, which was formally established on 3 November 1947. The 1950 Assam–Tibet earthquake was followed by major changes in the Brahmaputra and severe erosion and flooding around Dibrugarh, causing the loss of substantial parts of the town. To protect the rebuilt urban area, the Dibrugarh Town Protection Dyke was constructed by the Government of Assam in 1954–55. Dibrugarh University was established in 1965, further developing the city as a major centre of higher education in Upper Assam.

Dibrugarh became a separate district when it was split from Lakhimpur on 2 October 1971. On 1 October 1989 Tinsukia district was split from Dibrugarh.

== Climate ==
Dibrugarh has a humid subtropical climate (Köppen climate classification Cwa) with extremely wet summers and relatively dry winters.

Climate data for Dibrugarh Airport (1991–2020, extremes 1952–present)
Month	Jan	Feb	Mar	Apr	May	Jun	Jul	Aug	Sep	Oct	Nov	Dec	Year
Record high °C (°F)	29.5 (85.1)	33.2 (91.8)	34.5 (94.1)	36.0 (96.8)	38.8 (101.8)	38.2 (100.8)	39.8 (103.6)	39.8 (103.6)	39.5 (103.1)	37.2 (99.0)	33.8 (92.8)	30.6 (87.1)	39.8 (103.6)
Mean daily maximum °C (°F)	23.5 (74.3)	25.0 (77.0)	26.7 (80.1)	28.0 (82.4)	29.8 (85.6)	31.2 (88.2)	31.4 (88.5)	32.0 (89.6)	31.4 (88.5)	30.6 (87.1)	28.1 (82.6)	25.1 (77.2)	28.5 (83.3)
Daily mean °C (°F)	16.8 (62.2)	18.9 (66.0)	21.6 (70.9)	23.5 (74.3)	25.8 (78.4)	27.7 (81.9)	28.2 (82.8)	28.5 (83.3)	27.6 (81.7)	25.8 (78.4)	21.8 (71.2)	18.1 (64.6)	23.7 (74.6)
Mean daily minimum °C (°F)	10.1 (50.2)	13.0 (55.4)	16.4 (61.5)	19.2 (66.6)	22.0 (71.6)	24.3 (75.7)	24.9 (76.8)	25.2 (77.4)	24.1 (75.4)	21.0 (69.8)	15.7 (60.3)	11.2 (52.2)	18.8 (65.8)
Record low °C (°F)	1.0 (33.8)	4.8 (40.6)	8.1 (46.6)	10.8 (51.4)	14.1 (57.4)	16.5 (61.7)	19.9 (67.8)	19.5 (67.1)	18.4 (65.1)	13.3 (55.9)	6.5 (43.7)	2.7 (36.9)	1.0 (33.8)
Average rainfall mm (inches)	26.6 (1.05)	57.8 (2.28)	118.2 (4.65)	219.3 (8.63)	326.0 (12.83)	419.4 (16.51)	485.0 (19.09)	394.3 (15.52)	317.2 (12.49)	125.2 (4.93)	19.4 (0.76)	9.9 (0.39)	2,518.3 (99.15)
Average rainy days	2.9	5.3	8.9	12.7	14.7	18.8	20.6	16.1	13.5	6.8	2.0	0.9	123.2
Average relative humidity (%) (at 17:30 IST)	72	67	66	71	74	78	79	79	81	80	78	76	75
Source 1: India Meteorological Department
Source 2: Tokyo Climate Center (mean temperatures 1991–2020)

== Demographics ==
Historical population
Year	Pop.	±%
1872	2,774	—
1881	7,153	+157.9%
1891	9,876	+38.1%
1901	11,227	+13.7%
Source: Census of India

As of the 2011 India census, Dibrugarh city had a population of 154,296. Males constituted 54% of the population and females 46%. The sex ratio of Dibrugarh town was 961 per 1000 males.

The average literacy rate of Dibrugarh is 89.5%, which is higher than the national average literacy rate.

In Dibrugarh, 9% of the population is between 0 and 6 years of age, and the child ratio of girls is 940 per 1000 boys. Dibrugarh town area has a population of 154,296 according to a 2011 census. The Dibrugarh metropolitan areas include Barbari (AMC AREA), Dibrugarh, and Mahpowalimara Gohain Gaon.

=== Religion ===
Religion in Dibrugarh City (2011)
Religion	Percent
Hinduism	94.37%
Islam	4.68%
Buddhism	0.36%
Sikhism	0.23%
Others†	0.27%
Distribution of religions †Includes Jainism (<0.1%)

=== Language ===
Languages spoken in Dibrugarh city (2011)
1. Assamese (41.6%)
2. Bengali (23.5%)
3. Hindi (21.4%)
4. Nepali (1.04%)
5. Others (12.4%)

Dibrugarh town have a population of 154,296 as per 2011 census. Assamese is spoken by 64,223 people, Bengali at 36,283, Hindi at 33,011, Bhojpuri by 5,533 people, Nepali at 1,609 and 11,911 people speaks other languages.

== Civic Administration ==
The Dibrugarh Municipal Board, established in 1873, was upgraded and the Dibrugarh Municipal Corporation was formed in 2024 is divided into 22 wards. It is governed under the provisions of The Assam Municipal Corporation Act of 2022. Shivani Jerngal is the Commissioner of the Corporation. It has the following departments: Accounts, Administration, Animal Welfare, Climate Action, Drinking Water, Electrical, Enforcement, Engineering, Garage & Transportation, Gardening & Beautification, Governance, Grievances & RTI, Health & Hygiene, IT & Data, Land & Building, Lease, License, Sanitation, Swachh Bharat Mission – Urban, Taxation and Workers Welfare.

== Economy ==
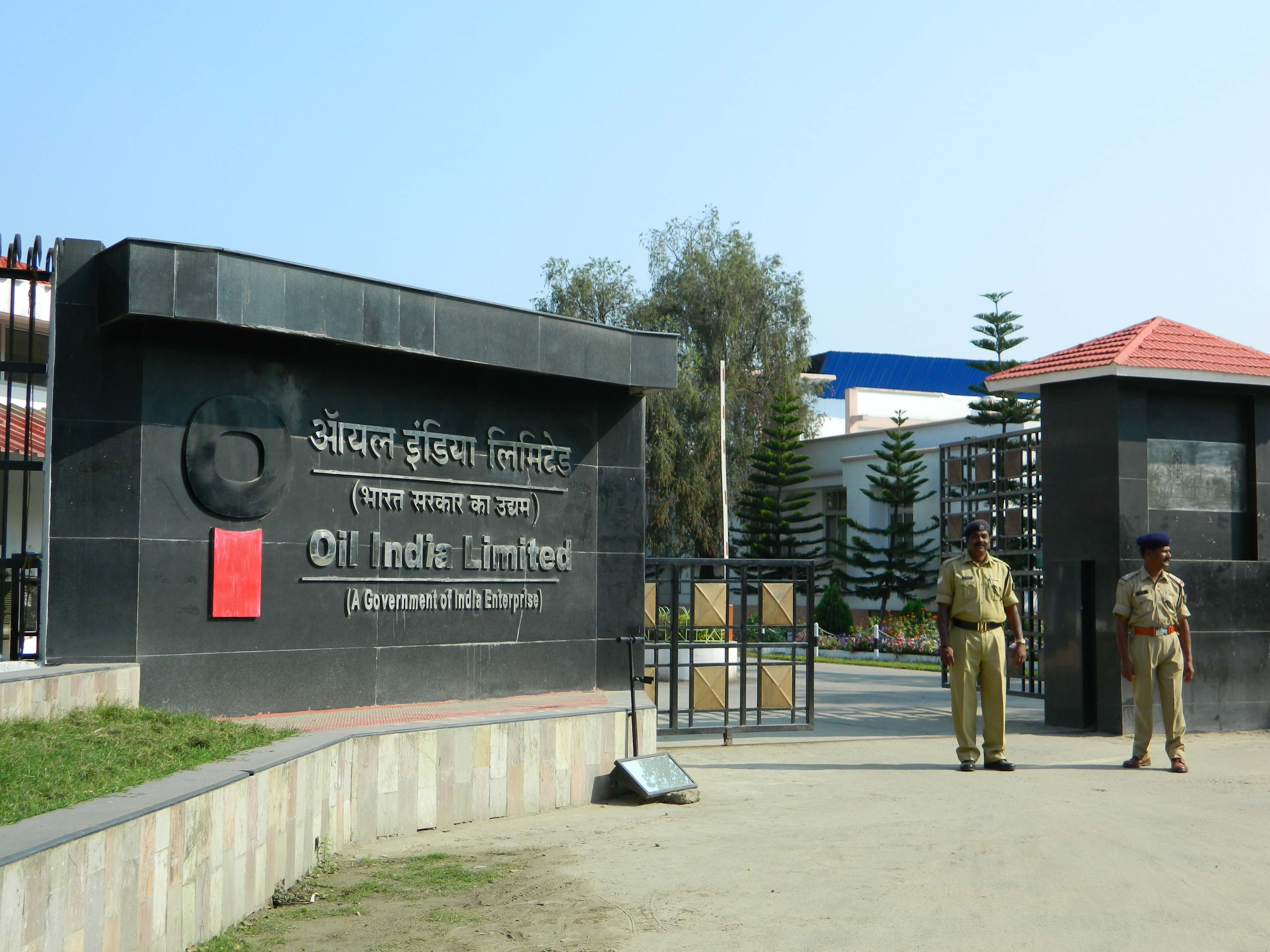
Fields Headquarters of Oil India Limited at Duliajan

=== Oil India Ltd. ===
The first oil well dug during the British era was in Digboi, 50 miles (80 km) from Dibrugarh. Today, Duliajan, Dikom, Tengakhat and Moran are the key locations for oil and gas industry in the district. Oil India Limited, the second public sector company in India engaged in exploration and transportation of crude oil has its field headquarters in Duliajan, 50km from Dibrugarh city. The company was granted Navratna status by the Ministry of Petroleum and Natural Gas, in 2010.

=== Brahmaputra Cracker and Polymer Limited (BCPL) ===
The Assam Gas Cracker Project, also known as Brahmaputra Cracker and Polymer Limited, was proposed as a part of implementation of Assam Accord signed by Government of India on 15 August 1985. The Assam Gas Cracker Project was approved by the Cabinet Committee on Economic Affairs, in its meeting held on 18 April 2006, under an equity arrangement of GAIL (70%), OIL (10%), NRL (10%) and Govt. of Assam (10%) with a project cost of ₹ 54.6 billion, in which the capital subsidy is ₹ 21.4 billion. The project was scheduled for completion in 60 months. However, the commissioning of the project has been pushed to December 2013, and the cost has escalated to ₹ 92.8 million. The site selected for Assam Gas Cracker Project is at Lepetkata, 15 km from Dibrugarh on NH-37. A joint-venture agreement was signed on 18 October 2006, and the company Brahmaputra Cracker and Polymer Limited was registered on 8 January 2007. Manmohan Singh, the prime minister of India, laid the foundation stone of this project on 9 April 2007.

=== APL ===
Assam Petro-Chemicals is a semi-governmental Indian company with major stakes held by Government of Assam, Oil India Limited and Assam Industrial Development Corporation (AIDC). The company was incorporated in 1971 and by 1976 had started production at their small methanol plant located at Namrup along with formaldehyde and a few urea-formaldehyde resins like urea-formaldehyde glue and urea-formaldehyde moulding powder. Post expansion in 1989 and 1998, the company expanded the methanol plant to the capacity of 100TPD (tonnes per day) and formaldehyde plant to 100TPD. The company announced in September 2017 that it would invest ₹1,337 crore (US$140 million) and expand to produce 500TPD methanol and 200TPD formalin and become the largest producer of methanol in India. The required feedstock for these plants are natural gas, urea and carbon dioxide. Natural gas, supplied by Oil India Ltd, is used as feedstock for methanol production. Urea and carbon dioxide are supplied by Namrup Fertilizer Plant.

=== Tea ===
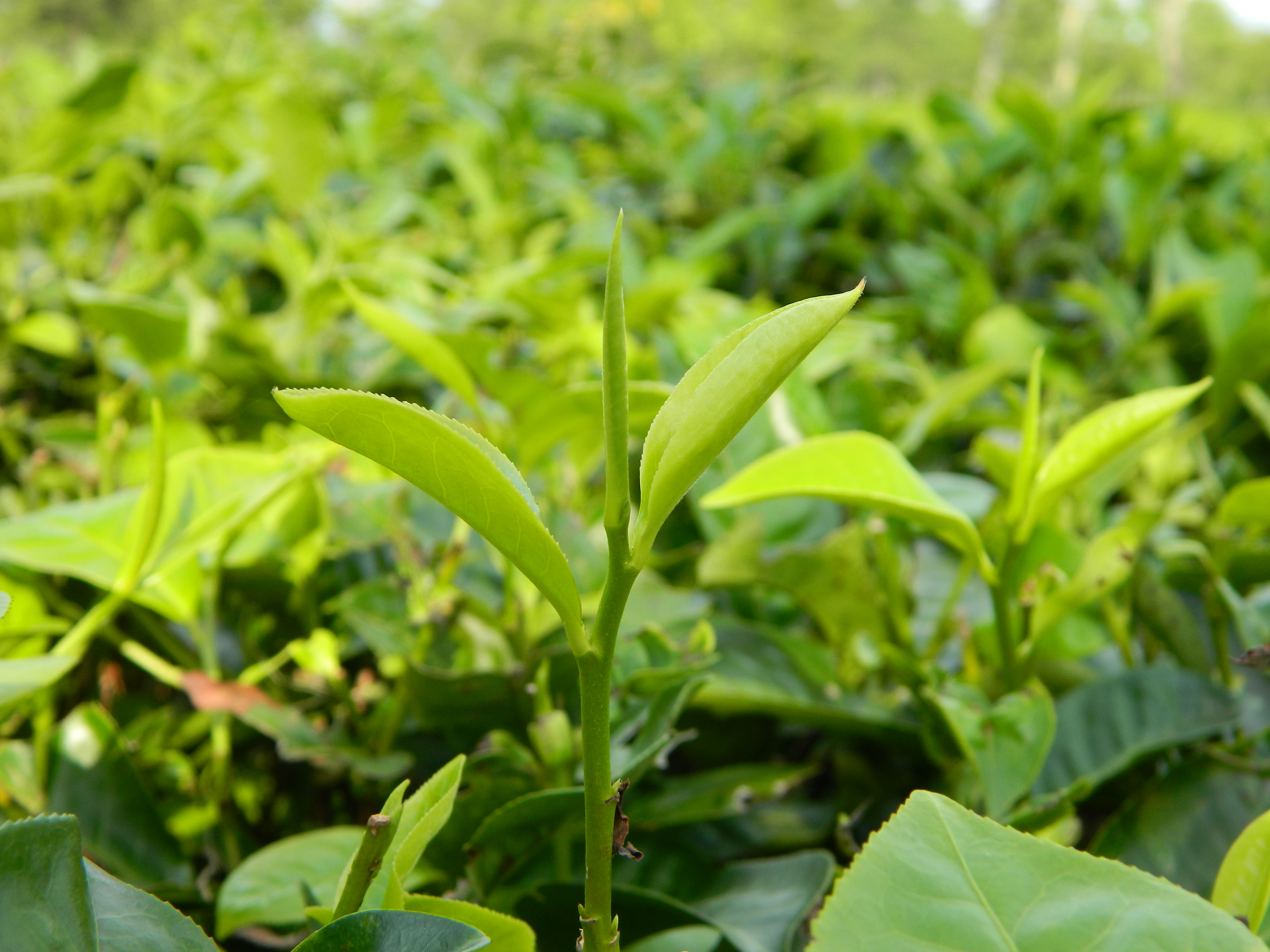
Tea

Dibrugarh hosts several tea gardens dating back to the British era. The first garden was at Chabua, a place 20 miles (32 km) away from Dibrugarh, owned by Maniram Devaan. Today, the headquarters of the Directorate of Development of Small Tea Growers in India is functioning from Dibrugarh, besides a Regional Office of the Tea Board of India headed by a deputy director of Tea Development (Plantation) is also located in the city. The Zone I of the Assam Branch Indian Tea Association (ABITA) is located at Dibrugarh.

=== Tourism ===
Rail, road and air connectivity coupled with the presence of large number of tourist spots in and around Dibrugarh city has seen impressive growth of tourism industry in this part of India in recent part. Dibrugarh has also become an important destination as well as a major transit point for tourists from both India and abroad. Such tourist circuits include – Dibrugarh – Roing – Mayudia – Anini Tourist Circuit, Dibrugarh – Guwahati river cruise besides 'Tea Tourism' for tourists who prefer serenity and novelty to the hustle-bustle of established tourist destinations. Some important tourist sites of the city are:

- Jagannath Temple, Dibrugarh
- Radha Krishna Mandir, Dibrugarh
- Raidongia Doul
- Bezor Doul
- Moiramora Doul
- Boga Baba Mazhar

== Transportation ==
=== Airways ===
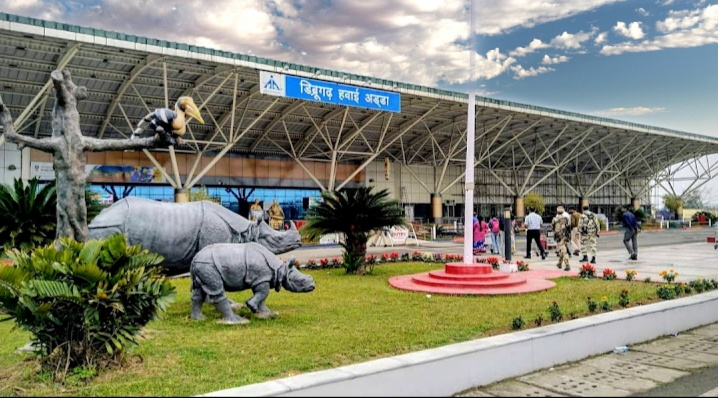
Dibrugarh Airport

Dibrugarh Airport, which is located around 15 km from Dibrugarh town at Mohanbari. Airlines operating from the airport are Air India, IndiGo, and Pawan Hans. IndiGo connects Dibrugarh daily with Delhi via Kolkata and another non-stop to Delhi while in return via Guwahati. In 2013, Dibrugarh airport was provided with night landing facility. Commercial operation of aerobridges have also started in this airport.

=== Railways ===
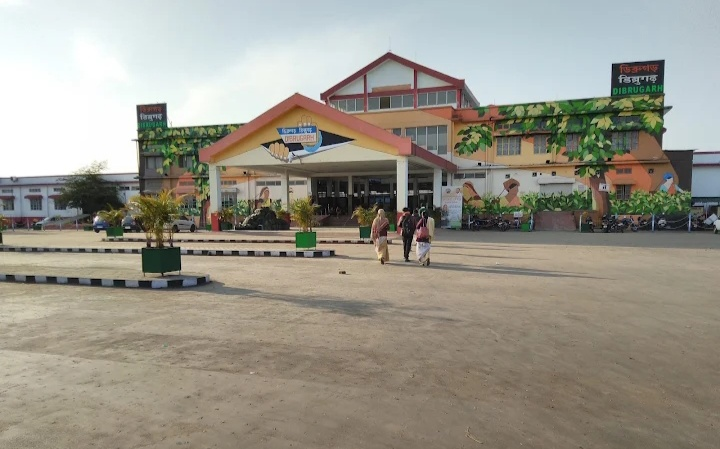
Dibrugarh Railway Station

Dibrugarh holds a prominent place in the history of Indian Railways, with the first railway services of the entire North-East India starting from here. On 1 May 1882, the first train rolled down the tracks from Streamerghat at Dibrugarh. On 15 May 1882, it was extended up to Dinjan. On 23 December that year, a goods train up to Chabua was introduced. On 18 February 1884, at 7:20 am, the then Chief Commissioner of Assam, Sir Charles Illiot, flagged off the first passenger train from Reehabari rail station (now Dibrugarh Town Railway station) to Ledo with 400 European and Indian passengers. As per the Centenary Souvenir of the Assam Railways and Trading Company Limited published in 1991, the said company, being the pioneer in building Dibru–Sadiya Railway, described the entire history of railway development from Dibrugarh. Dibrugarh Town and Dibrugarh are two railway stations of the city and also two of the important easternmost railway stations on the map of the Indian Railways connected to some of the important Indian cities like Bangalore, Chennai, Kochi, Trivandrum, Kolkata, Delhi, Kanyakumari etc. through the railways network. The new Dibrugarh railway station has been developed on the outskirts of the city at Banipur. It lies on the Lumding-Dibrugarh section of Tinsukia railway division. One goods yard is also being developed for loading and unloading of goods along with a truck shed, which can accommodate 25 trucks at a time.

=== Waterways ===
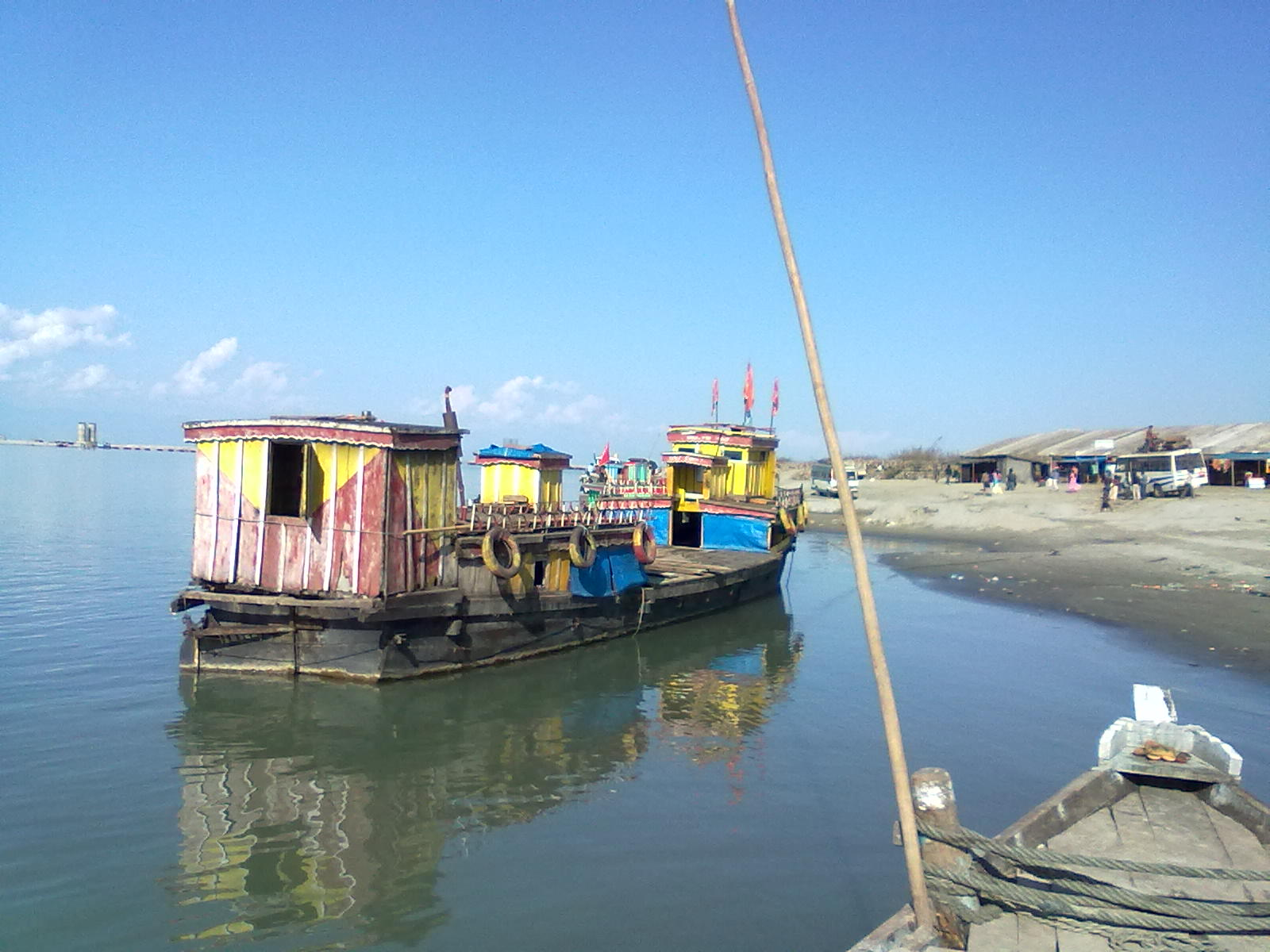
IWT Bogibeel Ghat

Dibrugarh also possesses a developed waterway transportation system along and across the Brahmaputra River, known as the National Waterway 2 which extends from Bangladesh Border to Sadiya. Ferry services link Dibrugarh with Sengajan (Dhemaji District), Panbari (Dhemaji) & Oiram Ghat (near Jonai Dhemaji). From Bogibeel IWT Ghat there are regular ferry Services to Kareng Chapori & Sisi Mukh. Moreover, luxury cruise services are also available from Dibrugarh to Guwahati. The cruise to Dibrugarh passes through Tezpur and the Kaziranga National Park.

== Education and research ==
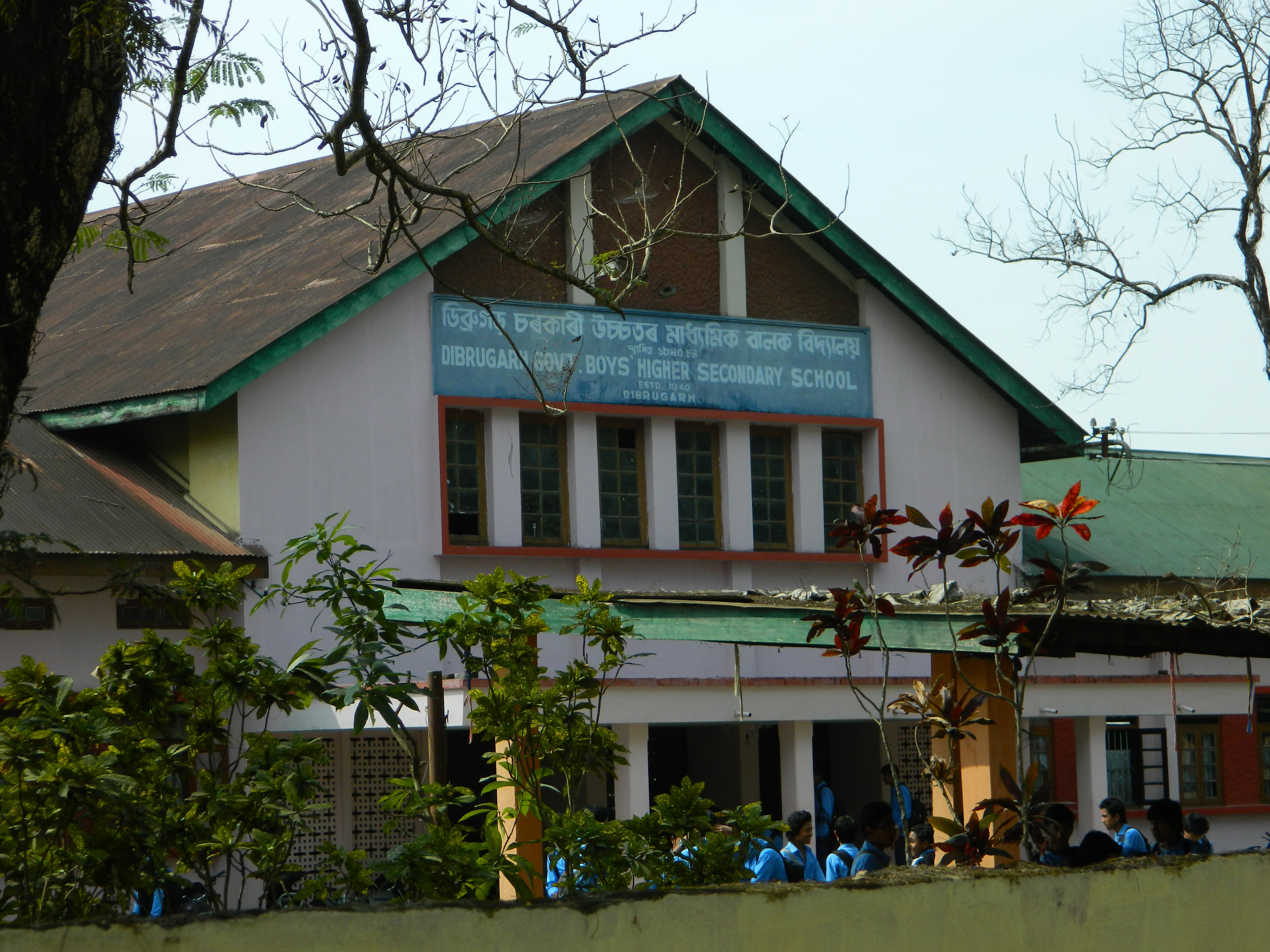
Dibrugarh Govt. Boys' H. S. School

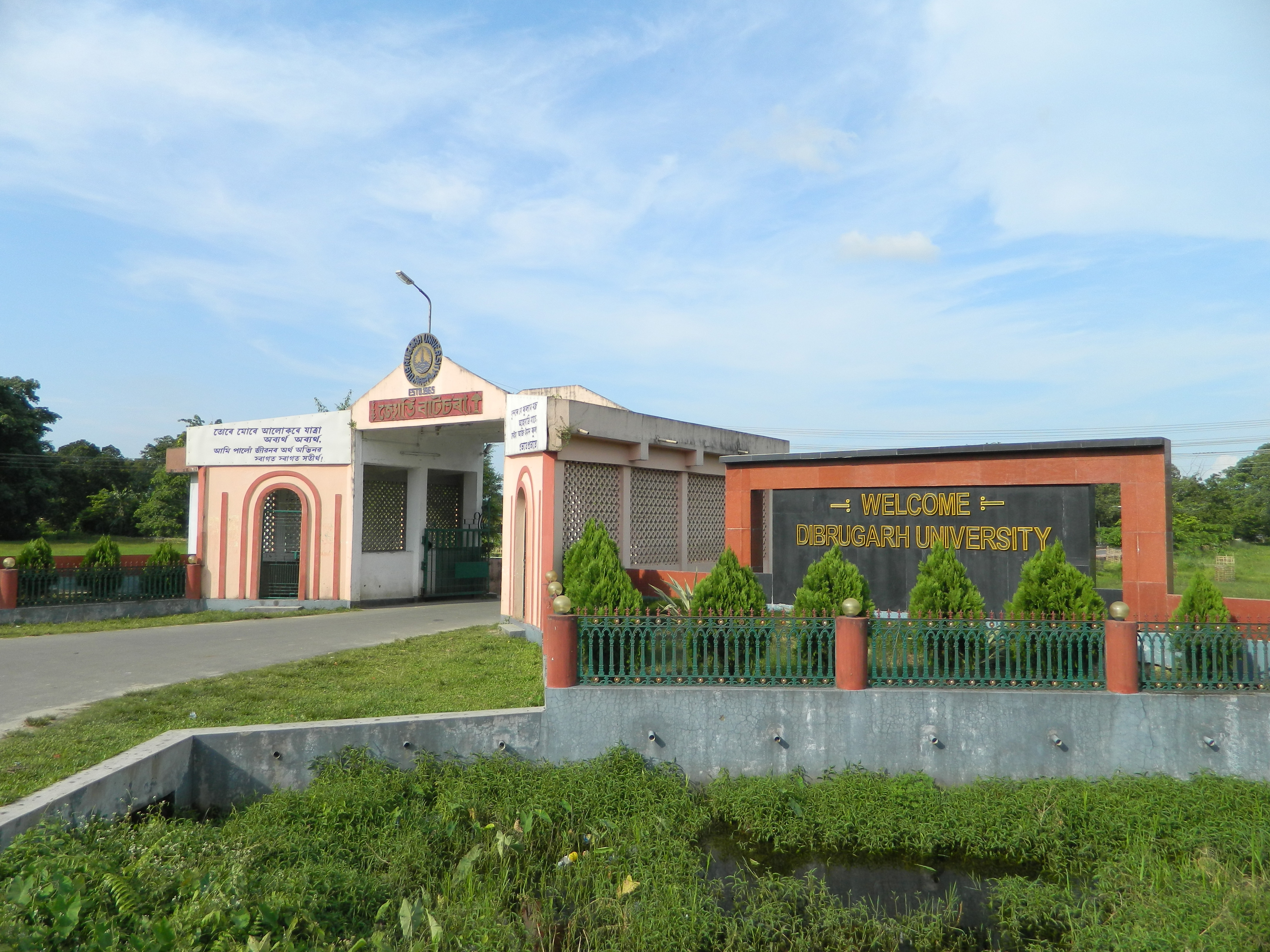
Dibrugarh University

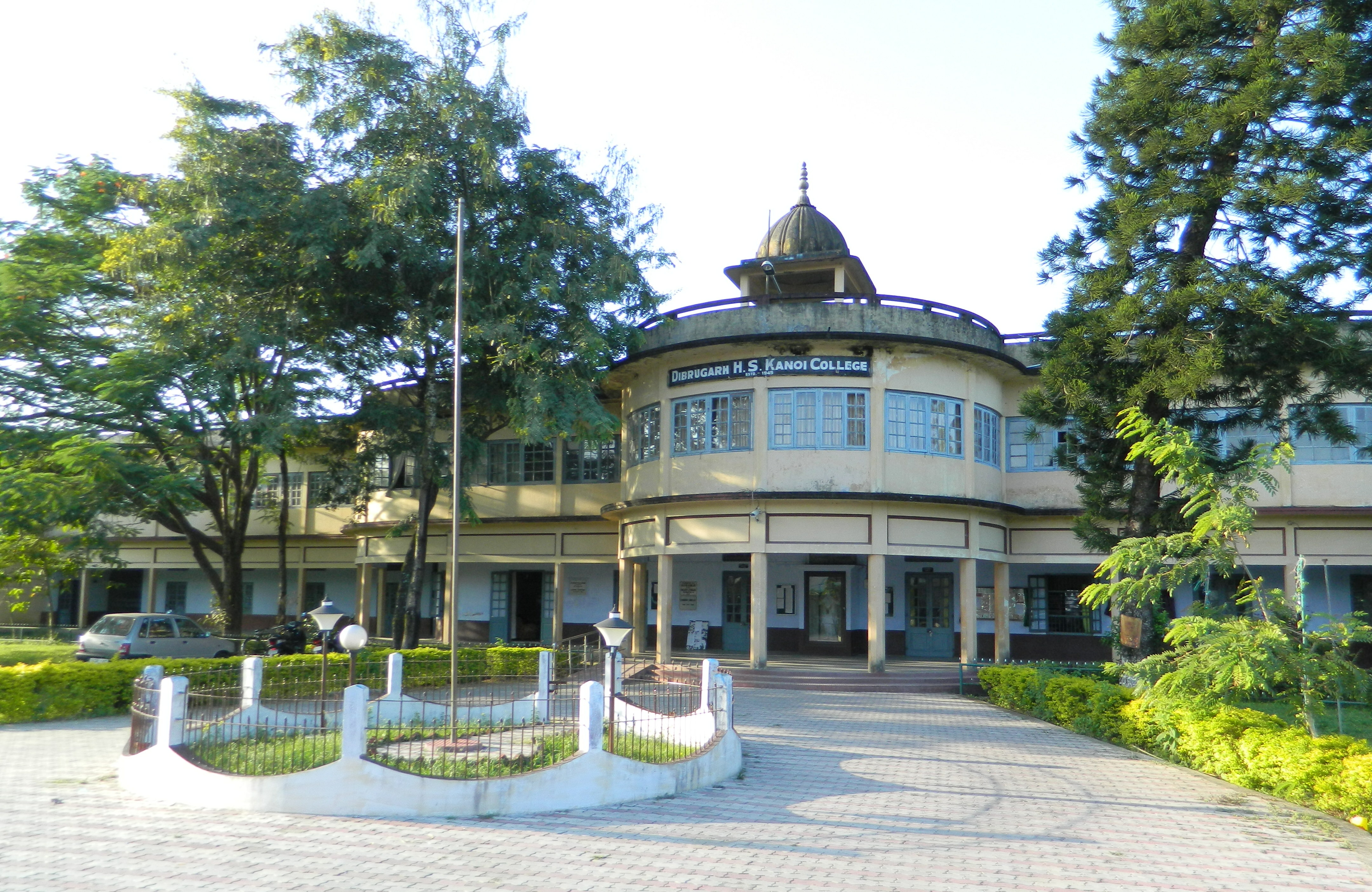
DHSK College, Dibrugarh

=== Schools ===
- Dibrugarh Govt. Boys' Higher Secondary School, Milan Nagar (Estd. 1840)
- Delhi Public School

=== Colleges ===
- DHSK Commerce College
- Dibru College
- Dibrugarh Hanumanbax Surajmall Kanoi College
- Salt Brook Academy
- D.H.S.K. Law College
- S.I.P.E. Law College
- Nandalal Borgohain City College
- Sri Sri Aniruddhadeva Junior College, Dibrugarh

=== University ===
- Dibrugarh University
- Sri Sri Aniruddhadeva Sports University

=== Medical Institutions ===
- Assam Medical College
- National Institute of Health Research, Dibrugarh

=== Technical Institutions ===
- Dibrugarh Polytechnic

== Media ==
=== Electronic media ===
Dibrugarh has a full-fledged All India Radio centre, All India Radio, Dibrugarh broadcasting in both AM (567 kHz at 529.1 metres of MW) and FM (101.30 MHz) bands airing three transmissions a day along with a 5-minute regional news bulletin at 6:00 pm every day. All India Radio, Dibrugarh was commissioned way back on 15 February 1968. The station has its studios located at Malakhubosa in Dibrugarh and the high power transmission tower located at Lepetkata near the present Brahmaputra Cracker and Polymer Limited site.

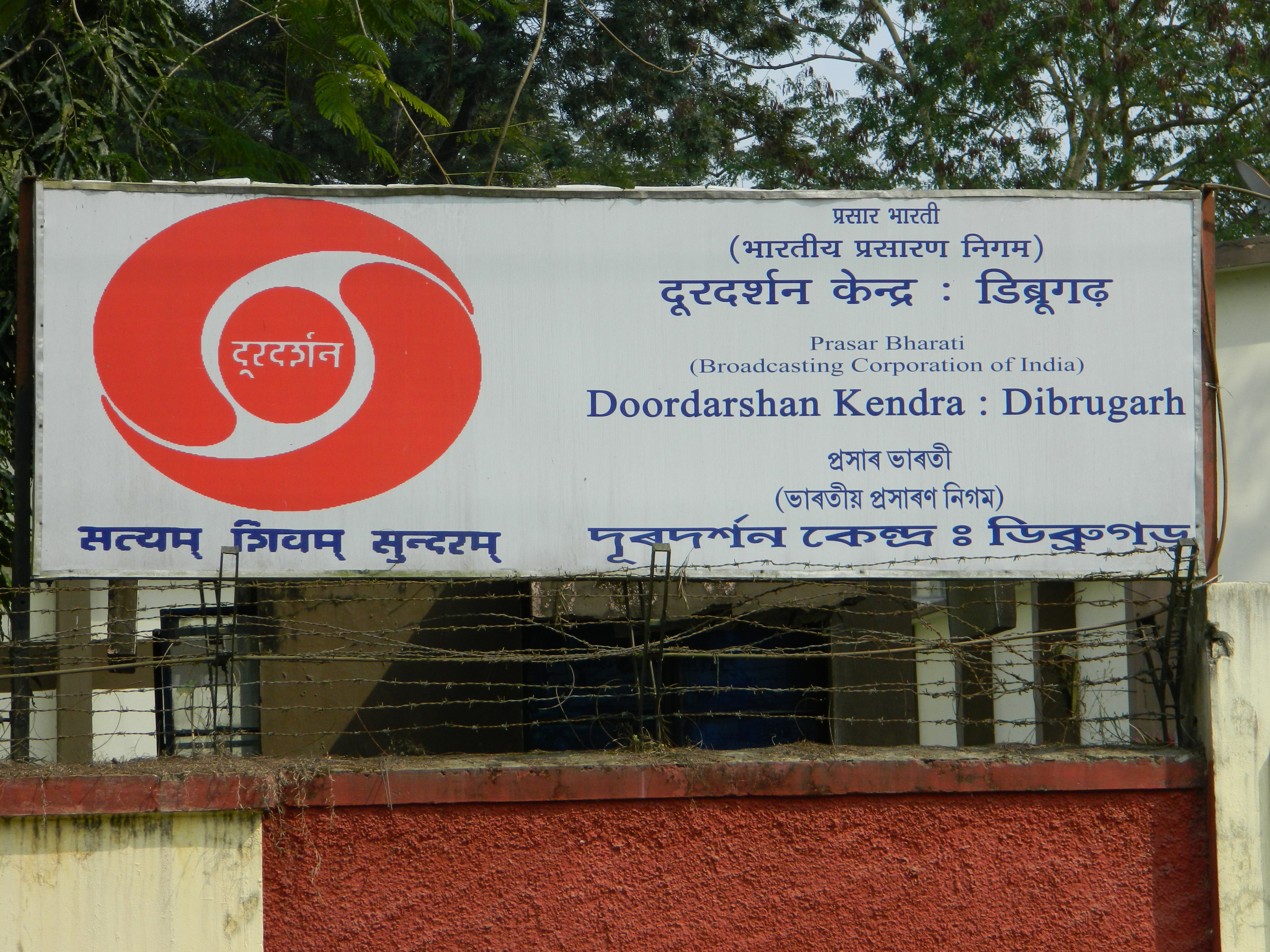
Doordarshan Kendra, Dibrugarh

As for television viewing, the second Doordarshan centre of Assam, telecasting programmes in Assamese language, Doordarshan Kendra, Dibrugarh was established in the city in the year 1993. Earlier the Kendra used to telecast Assamese language programmes capsuled in Guwahati beginning 20 December 1991. The programmes produced in this Kendra are telecast through a high power transmitter. Dibrugarh Doordarshan Kendra is contributing programmes to the 'DD North East' channel.

=== Print media ===
Dibrugarh has been a pioneer of newspaper journalism in entire Eastern India with the Times of Assam being the first newspaper published from Dibrugarh in the late nineteenth century. After four decades of publication, Times of Assam ceased to publish and from 1939 The Assam Tribune started its journey from Dibrugarh, which after 7 years of publication from Dibrugarh, shifted to Guwahati. However, this premier English daily of the North-East India, The Assam Tribune is published from Dibrugarh along with Guwahati and The Sentinel is published from Dibrugarh along with four other cities of North-East India. Several vernacular, as well English and Bengali dailies are published from Dibrugarh. Assamese newspapers published from Dibrugarh are Asomiya Pratidin, Janasadharan, Niyomiya Barta, Dainik Asam, Dainik Pratikshan and Pratibimba,. Jugashangkha is a Bengali daily published from Dibrugarh along with Guwahati and Silchar.

== Politics ==
Dibrugarh is part of Dibrugarh (Lok Sabha constituency). Sarbananda Sonowal of Bharatiya Janata Party is the current Member of Parliament from Dibrugarh. BJP's Prasanta Phukan is the incumbent MLA of Dibrugarh (Vidhan Sabha constituency).

== Notable people ==
- Jyoti Prasad Agarwala: Indian playwright, songwriter, poet, writer and film maker
- D. K. Barooah: Indian politician
- Paresh Baruah: leader of militant group, ULFA
- Toshen Bora, Indian national footballer
- Arunjit Borah: Indian filmmaker
- Parineeta Borthakur: Indian actress
- Plabita Borthakur : Indian actress
- Keshab Chandra Gogoi: former chief minister of Assam
- Ranjan Gogoi: 46th Chief Justice of India
- Moloya Goswami: Indian actress
- Jogendra Nath Hazarika : former chief minister of Assam
- Mafizuddin Ahmed Hazarika: poet
- Shamin Mannan: Indian actress
- Biju Phukan: Assamese actor
- Nilmoni Phukan: Assamese writer, poet, freedom fighter and politician.#
- Benudhar Rajkhowa, writer, poet
- Nagen Saikia: Indian writer
- Arun Sarma, writer
- Dipannita Sharma: Indian actress and model
- Sarbananda Sonowal: former chief minister of Assam (2016–2021) & Union Cabinet minister of India (2021–2023)
- Prahlad Chandra Tasa: Indian writer and Educationist.
- Rameswar Teli: MP, Lok sabha from Dibrugarh.

== See also ==
- Silchar
- Dibrugarh (disambiguation)

== Sources ==
- Barua, Deepali (1994), Urban history of India: a case study, Mittal Publication, New Delhi
- Endle, Sidney (1911). The Kacharis. Daryaganj: Cosmo Publications.
- Gogoi, Nityananda (2016). Historical Geography of Medieval Assam. India: EBH Publishers.
- Scott, James George (1967), Hsenwi State Chronicle
