= List of State Protected Monuments in Assam =

This is a list of State Protected Monuments as officially reported by and available through the website of the Archaeological Survey of India in the Indian state Assam. The monument identifier is a combination of the abbreviation of the subdivision of the list (state, ASI circle) and the numbering as published on the website of the ASI. 96 State Protected Monuments have been recognized by the ASI in Assam. Besides the State Protected Monuments, also the Monuments of National Importance in this state might be relevant.

== List of state protected monuments ==
SL. No.	Description	Location	Address	District	Coordinates	Image
S-AS-1	Ganesa Mandir	Abhayapuri		Bongaigaon		Ganesa Mandir
S-AS-2	Siva Temple at Sivatila	Sonai		Cachar		Upload Photo
S-AS-3	Baman Ruins			Darrong		Upload Photo
S-AS-4	Narikoli Ruins			Darrong		Narikoli Ruins
S-AS-5	Jorpukhuri Ruins			Darrong		Upload Photo
S-AS-6	Tamreswar Ruins			Darrong		Upload Photo
S-AS-7	Nandikeswar Dewalaya	Jamuguri		Sonitpur		Upload Photo
S-AS-8	Surya image at Golchepa			Sonitpur		Upload Photo
S-AS-9	Ghuguha Doul			Dhemaji		Upload Photo
S-AS-10	Magazine House			Dhubri		Upload Photo
S-AS-11	Panbari Ruins			Dhubri		Upload Photo
S-AS-12	Moterijhar Temple			Dhubri		Upload Photo
S-AS-13	Raidongia Doul		Lejai Miripathar village, Lejai-Kalakhowa	Dibrugarh	27°16′57″N 94°47′34″E	Raidongia Doul
S-AS-14	Moiramora Doul	Khamtighat		Dibrugarh	27°20′06″N 94°55′54″E	Upload Photo
S-AS-15	Bezor Doul		Bezor pothar, Dhemechi	Dibrugarh	27°09′20″N 94°46′24″E	Bezor Doul
S-AS-16	Rousch Monument			Goalpara		Upload Photo
S-AS-17	Mahadev Parvat			Goalpara		Upload Photo
S-AS-18	Paglatek ruins			Goalpara		Upload Photo
S-AS-19	Deoparvat Ruins			Golaghat		Deoparvat Ruins
S-AS-20	No.1 Dubarani Archaeological Site			Golaghat		Upload Photo
S-AS-21	Grave of Bahadur Gaon Burha			Jorhat		Upload Photo
S-AS-22	Ambari			Kamrup		Upload Photo
S-AS-23	Umananda Temple Archaeological Site			Kamrup		Upload Photo
S-AS-24	Siva Temple	Chatrakar		Kamrup		Upload Photo
S-AS-25	Manikarnesvar Temple	Rajaduar, North Guwahati		Kamrup		Upload Photo
S-AS-26	Kanai Boroshi Bowa Rock inscription			Kamrup		Upload Photo
S-AS-27	Aswaklanta Temple	North Guwahati		Kamrup		Aswaklanta Temple
S-AS-28	Dirgheswari Ruins			Kamrup		Dirgheswari Ruins
S-AS-29	Chilating Rock Inscription			Kamrup		Upload Photo
S-AS-30	Rudreswar Temple	Silsako in North Guwahati		Kamrup		Upload Photo
S-AS-31	Chandrasekhar Temple	Umananda		Kamrup		Upload Photo
S-AS-32	Hara Gauri Temple	Umananda		Kamrup		Upload Photo
S-AS-33	Na-Math			Kamrup		Na-Math
S-AS-34	Umachal rock inscription			Kamrup		Upload Photo
S-AS-35	Persian Rock Inscription			Kamrup		Upload Photo
S-AS-36	Pingaleswar Ruins			Kamrup		Upload Photo
S-AS-37	Chandar Marghar			Kamrup		Chandar Marghar
S-AS-38	Siddheswar Temple	Sualkuchi		Kamrup		Upload Photo
S-AS-39	Madan Kamdev			Kamrup		Madan Kamdev
S-AS-40	Karbi Memorial			Kamrup		Upload Photo
S-AS-41	Vaisistha Temple	Guwahati		Kamrup		Upload Photo
S-AS-42	Bhairabeswari Temple	Rangia		Kamrup		Upload Photo
S-AS-43	Nazirakhat Ruins			Kamrup		Upload Photo
S-AS-44	Borgang Rock Inscription	Borgang		Karbi Anglong		Upload Photo
S-AS-45	Ruins at Sarthe Rangpha			Karbi Anglong		Upload Photo
S-AS-46	Burhagosain Than			Karbi Anglong		Upload Photo
S-AS-47	Rock-cut Durga at Tilapara			Karbi Anglong		Upload Photo
S-AS-48	Rock-cut Ganesa at Boga Doul			Karbi Anglong		Upload Photo
S-AS-49	Metha-long-A			Karbi Anglong		Upload Photo
S-AS-50	Ruins at Sikari Rongpi Gaon			Karbi Anglong		Upload Photo
S-AS-51	Rock Inscription			Marigaon		Upload Photo
S-AS-52	Devasthan Ruins			Nagaon		Upload Photo
S-AS-53	Matharbari Ruins			Nagaon		Upload Photo
S-AS-54	Dolmens			Nagaon		Upload Photo
S-AS-55	Rajbari Group of Temples	Rajbari		Nagaon		Upload Photo
S-AS-56	Sankhadevi Ruins			Nagaon		Upload Photo
S-AS-57	Ruins of Temple	Mahadeosal Devaka		Nagaon		Upload Photo
S-AS-58	Kawaimari Ruins			Nagaon		Upload Photo
S-AS-59	Hatimura Temple	Jakhlabanda		Nagaon		Upload Photo
S-AS-60	Na-Nath Ruins			Nagaon		Upload Photo
S-AS-61	Maudonga Ruins			Nagaon		Upload Photo
S-AS-62	Warigadeng Ruins			Nagaon		Upload Photo
S-AS-63	Sibpur Ruins			Nagaon		Upload Photo
S-AS-64	Gachtal Ruins			Nagaon		Upload Photo
S-AS-65	Mikirati Ruins			Nagaon		Upload Photo
S-AS-66	Akashiganga Ruins			Nagaon		Upload Photo
S-AS-67	Kenduguri Ruins			Nagaon		Upload Photo
S-AS-68	Bileswar Temple			Nalbari		Upload Photo
S-AS-69	Thanks and Rampart			North Cacher		Upload Photo
S-AS-70	Rampart Stone Inscription			North Cacher		Upload Photo
S-AS-71	Maghnowa Temple	Narayanpur		North Lakhimpur		Maghnowa Temple
S-AS-72	Baghar Chukar Doul			North Lakhimpur		Upload Photo
S-AS-73	Gosaipukhuri Ruins			North Lakhimpur		Upload Photo
S-AS-74	Siva Doul	Rudrasagar Napukhri		Sivasagar		Upload Photo
S-AS-75	Vishnu Doul			Sivasagar		Upload Photo
S-AS-76	Devi Doul			Sivasagar		Upload Photo
S-AS-77	Ranganath Doul			Sivasagar		Upload Photo
S-AS-78	Fakuwa Doul			Sivasagar		Upload Photo
S-AS-79	Haragouri Doul			Sivasagar		Upload Photo
S-AS-80	Gorokhiya Doul of Mai Doul			Sivasagar		Upload Photo
S-AS-81	Piyali Phukanar Doul			Sivasagar		Upload Photo
S-AS-82	Thowra Doul			Sivasagar		Upload Photo
S-AS-83	Vishnu Doul			Sivasagar		Upload Photo
S-AS-84	Jagadhatri Doul			Sivasagar		Upload Photo
S-AS-85	Borpatra Tank			Sivasagar		Upload Photo
S-AS-86	Gallows site of Piyoli Phukan			Sivasagar		Upload Photo
S-AS-87	Charaideo			Sivasagar		Upload Photo
S-AS-88	Bogi Doul			Sivasagar		Upload Photo
S-AS-89	Golaghar			Sivasagar		Golaghar
S-AS-90	Sculpture at Chummery Compound			Sonitpur		Upload Photo
S-AS-91	Dhandi Ruins			Sonitpur		Dhandi Ruins
S-AS-92	Vaiswanath Temple	Viswanath Chariali		Sonitpur		Vaiswanath Temple
S-AS-93	Christian Cemetery			Sonitpur		Upload Photo
S-AS-94	Vasudev Doul			Sonitpur		Vasudev Doul
S-AS-95	Garh Doul			Sonitpur	26°38′46″N 92°45′19″E	Garh Doul
S-AS-96	Bangaon Ruins			Sonitpur		Upload Photo

== See also ==
- List of State Protected Monuments in India for other State Protected Monuments in India
- List of Monuments of National Importance in Assam
