= Dibrugarh (disambiguation) =

Dibrugarh is a city in Assam.

Dibrugarh may also refer to:

- Dibrugarh District, district in Assam
- Dibrugarh University, University in Assam
- Dibrugarh Lok Sabha Constituency, Lok Sabha Constituency in Assam
- Dibrugarh Rajdhani Express, train in India
- Dibrugarh-Rajendra Nagar Weekly Express, another train in India
- Dibrugarh airport, airport in Assam
- Dibrugarh-Kanniyakumari Vivek Express, train in India
- Dibrugarh-Bangalore Express, a.k.a New Tinsukia-SMVT Bengaluru Superfast Express, train in India
- Dibrugarh railway station, railway station in Assam
- Dibrugarh Municipal Corporation, local civics body of Dibrugarh
- New Tinsukia Amritsar Express, a.k.a Dibrugarh-Amritsar Express
- Dibrugarh Town railway station, another railway station in Assam
- New Tinsukia-Tambaram Express, a.k.a Dibrugarh-Tambaram Express
- Lumding-Dibrugarh Section, railway section in India
- Dibrugarh Development Authority, statutory civics body
- Dibrugarh Dental College, a.k.a Srimanta Sankardeva University of Health Sciences
- Dibrugarh-Deogarh Express, an Express train
- Dibrugarh Govt. Boys' Higher Secondary School, Public school in Assam
- Dibrugarh-Gomti Nagar Amrit Bharat Express , an Amrit Bharat Express train route in India
- Dibrugarh Hanumanbax Surajmall Kanoi College, College in Dibrugarh
- Dibrugarh Hanumanbax Surajmal Kanoi Commerce College, College in Assam
- Dibrugarh-Kolkata Superfast Express, train in India
- Dibrugarh-Chandigarh Express, train in India
