= Garh Doul =

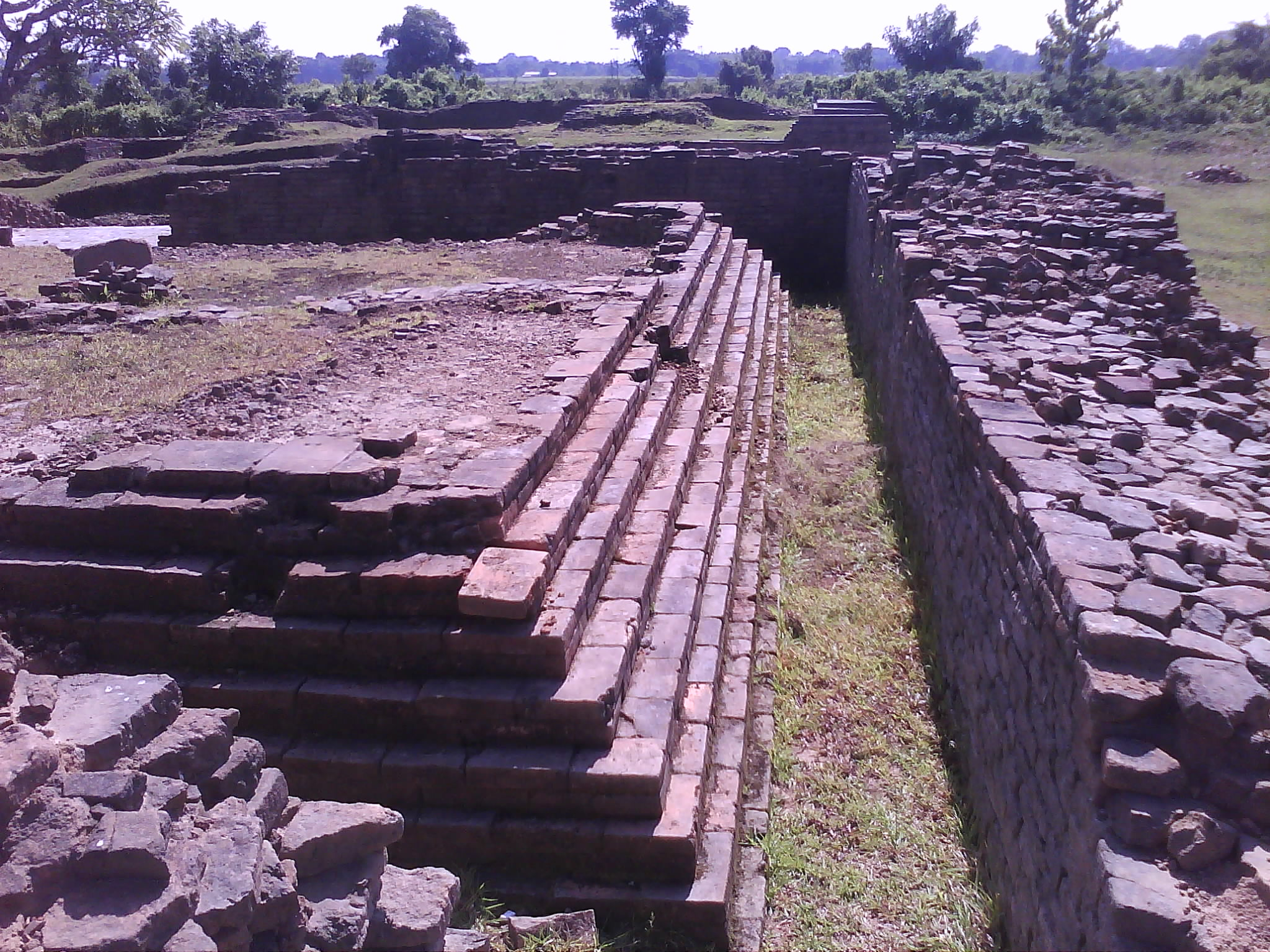

- Location within Assam

General information
- Location: Sonitpur; Assam; India
- Coordinates: 26°38′46″N 92°45′19″E
- Construction started: 7th and 8th century CE

Technical details
- Structural system: Bricks and Indigenous type of cement

Garh Doul archaeological site is an important State Protected Monument in Assam, India, situated at Tarajan Kumargaon and about 7 kilometres (4.3 mi) away from Tezpur, Sonitpur district. The archaeological site is listed as an ASI monument under number S-AS-95. This is fortified in all direction reinforced rampart and covers an area of 250×250 m. The site has two brick mounds, which contains the foundation of brick temple plinths. The remains are datable to 7th and 8th century CE.

== History ==
Excavations and architectural analysis date Garh Doul’s construction to the 7th–8th centuries CE, a period marked by early Brahminical temple building in Assam under local dynasties such as the Varman Dynasty and Salastambha rulers. According to the legend constructed by the Brahmin pandits in the Kalika Purana, the fortress was built by the mythical king Banasura to keep his daughter Usha. Though the Mahabharata and Bhagavata Purana mention Banasura’s capital as Sonitpura, Garh Doul’s association with Usha persists in local folklore and contributes to its popular appeal.

== Present ==
The ruins in this place are still undiscovered and the Archaeological Survey Department of Assam is continuing their works and also constructed a park to make it a tourism site in Tezpur. Intermittent excavations by Assam’s Department of Archaeology (2009–2010) revealed brick drains, terracotta sherds, and fragments of votive plaques, confirming ritual use of the temple precincts. However, a 2010 The Assam Tribune report highlighted serious neglect, overgrown ramparts, cattle grazing within the enclosure, and vandalism prompting public outcry and renewed calls for Archaeological Survey of India intervention.
