= Prahlad Chandra Tasa =

Indian writer and educationist (born 1950)

- Born: 26 October 1950 (age 75); Gachemora, Assam, India
- Occupations: Writer educationist
- Known for: Assamese literature
- Spouse: Hema Prabha Gogoi
- Children: Two sons
- Parent(s): Lakhan Tasa; Mukti Tasa
- Awards: Padma Shri

Prahlad Chandra Tasa (born 1950) is an Indian writer and educationist, best known for his writings on education. He is the vice president of the Asam Sahitya Sabha where he has also served as a general secretary. He has published several books on educational and social issues, including Asomor chah janagosthi, an anthology of articles on the lives of the tea workers of Assam. The Government of India awarded him the fourth highest civilian honour of the Padma Shri, in 2016, for his contributions to literature and education.

== Biography ==
Prahlad Chandra Tasa was born on 26 October 1950 at Gachemora in the northeast Indian state of Assam in a poor family to Lakhan Tasa–Mukti couple and did his early education at the local primary school. After completing the schooling at Gachemora High School, he graduated from Dibrugarh Hanumanbux Surajmal Kanoi College and started his career as a school teacher at Bagmibar Nilmoni Phukan Higher Secondary School, then known as George Institution, on a temporary position, in 1973. While serving there, he founded Jamira Xahitya Xabha, a literary organization and served as its founder general secretary. When the tenure of the temporary post at the school expired, he joined Jamira Tea Estate Lower Primary School where he worked for five years and moved to Rameswar High School as a teacher till 1985. It was this time he was appointed as the school sub inspector of Tinsukia district. He served in the education department for 27 years and superannuated as the Block Elementary Education Officer of Barbarua in 2012.

Tasa was elected as the president of Dibrugarh Xahitya Xabha in 1995 and became the district president in 2000. In 2013, he was made the general secretary of the Asam Sahitya Sabha for a two-year term at the end of which he became the vice president of the organization, his term expiring in 2017. He has published a number of books, on education as well as on the socio-cultural milieu of Assam. Asomor chah janagosthi, a collection of articles edited by him is an account on the lives of the tea workers of the state. His other publications include the poem anthology, Satabdi, a biography, Byaktitor Sandhanot and prose writings such as Siksha Samikhya, Siksha Anwesha, Chah Bagichat Gana Sakhyarota, Chah Bagichat Sikshar Prokhar, Chah Shramikor Sanskritir Ruprekha, Jhumoir Nritya Geet and Chah Shramikor Swasthya Chinta.

The Government of India awarded him the civilian honor of the Padma Shri in 2016. He is married to Hema Prabha Gogoi and the couple has two sons, Anadi Swami and Ananta Swami, both medical doctors. The family lives in Dibrugarh.

== See also ==
- Asam Sahitya Sabha
