= Arunjit Borah =

Arunjit Borah is an Indian filmmaker known for his work in Assamese and Hindi cinema. He is recognised for directing films such as Goodbye Guruji, Taxii, Letters from Deuta, Midnight Song, Zibah and Mini.

== Early life and education ==
Borah was born and raised in Dibrugarh, Assam, India. He completed his schooling in Dibrugarh before pursuing an Executive MBA from Vinayak Mission University. After a stint in the corporate sector, he shifted his focus to filmmaking.

== Career ==
Borah began his film career as a first assistant director in the Hindi feature film Project Marathwada. He later gained critical attention for his short film Taxii, which was screened at several film festivals in India and abroad. The soundtrack for the film featured a collaboration with Los Angeles-based composer Brandi Thomas.

Following Taxii, Borah directed his second short film Letters from Deuta. His work also includes the Jammu Tourism television commercial Discover Jammu, showcasing the region's tourism potential.

In 2021, he released Midnight Song, his first Assamese-language feature film. Borah later directed the Hindi short film Zibah, centred on the subject of female genital mutilation. The film was screened at international festivals and received multiple awards.

In 2025, Borah's film Goodbye Guruji was selected for Festival Gange Sur Seine in Paris, France, where it had its global premiere in October. Borah is credited as both writer and director of the film. The cast includes Partha Pratim Hazarika and Aimee Barua in lead roles. The story follows Prayash Saikia, nicknamed Guruji, a young teacher who introduces creative and unconventional learning methods to revive student engagement at Kinkinia Primary School.

== Filmography (selected) ==
- Taxii – short film
- Letters from Deuta – short film
- Discover Jammu – television commercial
- Midnight Song – feature film
- Zibah – short film
- Mini – feature film
- Goodbye Guruji – feature film
