= Moiramora Doul =

Historical site in India

- Ruins of the brick plinth from Moiramora site

Religion
- Affiliation: Ethnic religion
- District: Dibrugarh district
- Deity: Durga

Location
- Location: Khamtighat
- State: Assam
- Country: India
- Interactive map of Moiramora Doul
- Coordinates: 27.335316°N 94.929407°E

Architecture
- Creator: Chutia kings
- Completed: 13th-14th century (brick temple)

Moiramora Doul or Moiramora Than is a historical site in India located at Khamtighat in the Dibrugarh district of Mancotta Mouza. It was constructed during the rule of Chutia kings. At present, only the ruins of the Moiramora Doul or Than remain, with the Moiramora Satra now standing at the site. The ruins are located on the banks of the Dihing River at Khamtighat. The site preserves a remarkable collection of stone sculptures depicting a variety of postures and expressions, dating from the early to late medieval period. The Archaeological Department of the Government of Assam has recognized the Moiramora Doul as a State Protected Monument.

Moiramora temple ruins

== History ==
=== Early period ===
The original stone temple at the site of Moimora can be stylistically dated to the early medieval period (9th-10th century). In later centuries, this structure was replaced by a brick temple. Thermoluminescence (TL) dating of bricks from the site places its construction in the 13th–14th century, when the region was ruled by the Chutia kingdom, indicating that the temple was likely constructed under Chutia royal patronage. Studies of palaeochannels in Upper Assam based on satellite imagery suggest that, during the medieval period, the Dihing River followed a more southerly course away from the site, through the Sibsagar district and Bakata. Assamese Buranji chronicles describe Bakata as being situated on the banks of the Dihing River, a view also noted by historian Edward Gait in his account of Assam’s historical geography.

Stone sculptures from Moiramora site

=== Satra period ===
Bor Jadumoni, a prominent disciple of Gopal Ata of the Kaal-Sanghati Satra of Ekasarana Dharma founded by Srimanta Sankardeva and Sri Sri Madhavdeva, established the Moiramora Satra at Kalaulwa on the banks of the Burhi Dihing River. During the reign of the Ahom king Sujinphaa (1675–77 AD), both the king and the premier Atan Burhagohain converted to Nam Dharma and became disciples of the Moiramora Satra. The satra and its pond were constructed under Ahom patronage. An earthquake and subsequent flooding and erosion by the Burhi Dihing caused the collapse of the satra, which was later repaired by the Ahom kings in the 17th–18th century.

The satra was later damaged by natural disasters and abandoned due to internal uprisings in the Ahom kingdom and the third Burmese invasion. It was subsequently re-established at Kujibali in Hahchara Mouza of Sivasagar district. After the Burhi Dihing changed its course, ruins of the original satra were rediscovered by later settlers, who built a Than Ghar for worship. The family of the satradhikar later re-established the satra at the site, continuing the propagation of Nam Dharma.

Moiramara Brick plinth

== Description ==
In 2010, the Government of Assam initiated a plan by the Archaeological Department to conserve and enhance the Moiramora Than. The archaeological department, along with the Dibrugarh district administration and local youth organisations, constructed a fence, a concrete museum, and an altar covering around 7 bighas of land. The site contains 13 rock-cut idols and fragments of several idols preserved in the gardens and local galleries of the Moiramora Than archaeological site. Excavations conducted in 2018 revealed evidence of two distinct periods of cultural civilisation. The museum showcases altars from ancient temples made of brick, copper coins from the British era, silver flowers, stone sculptures, and clay bricks of various shapes. Notably, the granite stone sculptures found here date back to the 8th to 9th centuries CE, while the sandstone sculptures are relatively more recent.

Brick remains from Moiramora site

== Location ==
The Moiramora Daul is situated on the banks of the Burhidihing River, approximately two kilometres west of Khamati Ghat in Mancotta Mouza of Dibrugarh district. It is well connected to Dibrugarh city, with the Dibrugarh railway station around 20 km away and the Dibrugarh Airport about 27 km away. The Moiramora Satra is situated in the former Langeri Mouza, which is now known as "Jakai Napam Than Gaon."

== Bibliography ==
- Bhuyan, Rashmi Rekha (2023). "Archaeological Remains of the Dihing Valley of Assam: A Visit to Moiramora" (PDF). Heritage: Journal of Multidisciplinary Studies in Archaeology. 11 (2): 532.
- Deori, Nabajit (2018). Preliminary Report of the Excavation Conducted at Moiramora Archaeological Site, Dibrugarh District of Assam (2017–2018) (Report). Government of Assam.
- Saikia, Raktim Ranjan; Taye, Chaitra Dhar; Amin, Nurul; Konwar, Sorat; Panzeri, Laura; Galli, Anna (2024). "Chronological and Archaeometric Evaluation of Bricks from Archaeological Sites of Upper Assam, Northeast India: Estimation of the Firing Temperature and Civilization History". Applied Sciences. 14 (14). doi:10.3390/app14146271. hdl:10281/522302.
