= Bezor Doul =

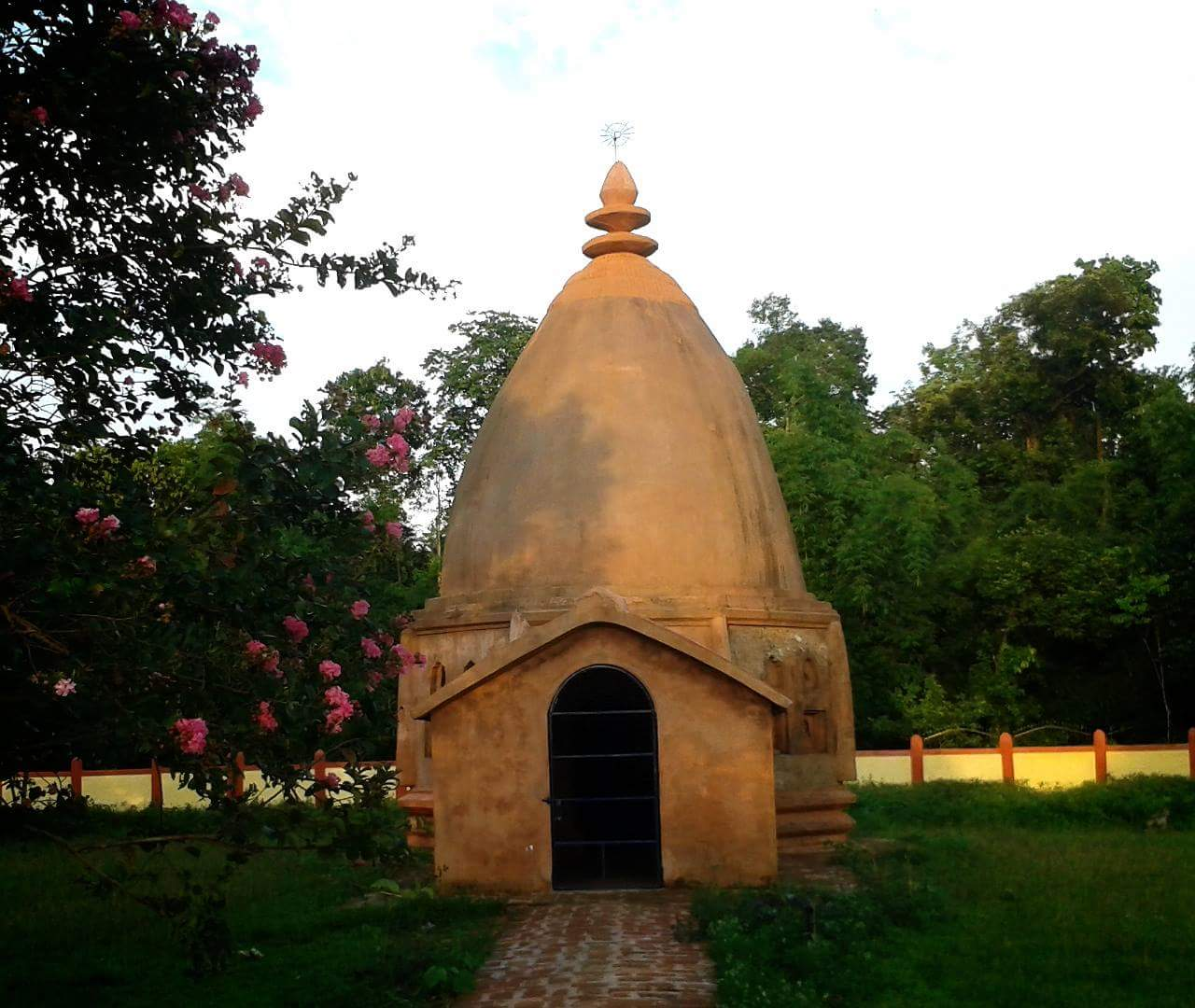
- View of the Bezor Doul
- Interactive map of the Bezor Doul area

General information
- Architectural style: Nilachal architecture
- Location: Dibrugarh, Assam, India
- Coordinates: 27.1557°N 94.7734°E

Technical details
- Structural system: Bricks and Indigenous type of cement

Design and construction
- Main contractor: Rudra Singha

Bezor Doul or Bez Doul is a historical monument located at Bezor pothar in the Dhemechi area of Dibrugarh district. It is situated about 5 km from Dimow town of Sivasagar district. The Bezor Doul is a Vishnu Doul and is built with an octagonal sanctuary and a steep gap. It is an example of late medieval brick temple architecture from the Ahom period. During the Ahom era, a traditional medicine practitioner of Chung Khel received the title of Bezbarua for his efficiency. He was granted vast lands by the Ahom kings in the present-day Bezor pothar area. The doul was constructed by the Ahom king Rudra Singha in his memory. The walls of this small doul are quite thick. Various flower jali works adorned the walls of the doul, but they are no longer present. There are no idols in this doul, but Vishnu is still worshipped here. The Archaeological Department of the Government of Assam has recognized the Bezor Doul as a State Protected Monument.

== Location ==
Bezor Doul, also known as Bez Doul, is located in Bezor pathar in the Dhemechi area of Dibrugarh district. It is an ancient monument from the Ahom era, situated about 5 km from Dimow in Sivasagar district.

== History ==
In the Ahom era, a traditional medicine practitioner (Bez) of the Chung Khel promoted and received the title of Bezbaruah for his excellent medical treatment to the Royal family. He was granted vast tracts of land in the area of present-day Bezor Pathar (Fields of the Bez) by the Ahom kings. The Bez Daul was built by Swargadeo Rudra Singha in memory of that Bezbarua. Some believe that Bezbarua built the doul himself. Later, the doul became known as Bez Doul or Bezor Doul.

== Architecture ==
At present, the Bezor Doul and a large area around it are protected by concrete walls. The doul is very beautiful in appearance, and its walls are quite thick. This doul is identified as a Vishnu Doul from its top of its peak. Although there are no idols inside the doul, lord vishnu is still worshipped here. The Bezor Doul is an octagonal sanctuary with a steep background. It is a late medieval brick monument from the Ahom dynasty.

The entrance to the Jagmohan of Bezor Doul is on the west side. The canopy of Jagmohan is bow-shaped, with a cap in the middle and the top in the shape of a Majubandhani. The canopy is connected by two roofs up to the jangha. Antarala is built with an inverted U shaped entrance. The walls of the doul are quite thick, with a gabaksha on the wall and one kundraksha on top of the gabaksha. The inner area is conical and well-structured. There are no sculptures here.

The doul was formerly decorated jali works with flowers and leaves from bottom to top. The carvings were iroded away from the body of the temple over time. The middle part of the jangha is shaped like a slightly swollen drum from the outside. The shikhara of the doul is in the shape of a banana flower and slightly elevated to the north. The Kalasha at the top resembles a lotus flower bud, and the Sri Chakra is placed on the Kalasha as a weapon.

== Location ==
Bezor Doul, also known as Bez Doul, is located in Bezor p othar in the Dhemechi area of Dibrugarh district. It is an ancient monument from the Ahom era, situated about 5 km from Dimow in Sivasagar district. It is well-connected by transportation from Moranhat and Dimow town. Maranhat railway station is about 21 km away and Dibrugarh Airport is about 60 km away from it.
