= Assam Petro-Chemicals =

Semi-governmental Indian company

Assam Petro-Chemicals Limited
- Company type: Public
- Traded as: BSE: 506267
- Industry: Chemicals
- Founded: 1971; 55 years ago
- Headquarters: Namrup, Assam, India
- Key people: Bikul Ch.Deka (Chairman); Hemanta Gogoi (Vice-Chairman); Rajnesh Gogoi (Managing Director)
- Products: Industrial chemicals
- Owner: Government of Assam (36.41%); Oil India Limited (48.71%); Assam Industrial Development Corporation (11.53%)
- Website: assampetrochemicals.co.in

Assam Petro-Chemicals Limited is a PSU which is owned by Oil India Limited and Government of Assam. It is the largest producer of Methanol and Formaldehyde in India with production capacity of 600TPD Methanol and 325TPD Formaldehyde. The company was incorporated in 1971 and by 1976 had started production at their small methanol plant located at Namrup along with formaldehyde and a few urea-formaldehyde resins like urea-formaldehyde glue and urea-formaldehyde moulding powder. Post expansion in 1989 and 1998, the company expanded the methanol plant to the capacity of 100TPD (tonnes per day) and formaldehyde plant to 100TPD. The company announced in September 2017 that it would invest ₹1,337 crore (US$140 million) and expand to produce 500TPD methanol and 200TPD formalin and become the largest producer of methanol in India. The required feedstock for these plants are natural gas, urea and carbon dioxide. Natural gas, supplied by Oil India Ltd, is used as feedstock for methanol production. Urea and carbon dioxide are supplied by BVFCL Fertilizer Plant.

== Methanol production ==
The company is among the top five producers of methanol in India; the other four being Gujarat Narmada Valley Fertilisers & Chemicals, Deepak Fertilisers and Petrochemicals Corporation Limited, Rashtriya Chemicals & Fertilizers and National Fertilizers Limited.

In October 2018, the company started a pilot project to use methanol as cooking gas in place of conventional liquefied petroleum gas (LPG). The company was the first in India to offer methanol as an alternative to traditional cooking fuel. At the launch, the canisters, weighing 1.2 kilograms (2.6 lb) each, were priced at ₹32 each. Eighteen such canisters of methanol were equivalent to one LPG cylinder which is used for domestic cooking in India. The project was launched in support of NITI Aayog under their concept of "methanol economy" to reduce the cost of importing LPG.
