= Boga Baba Mazhar =

Muslim place of worship in Assam, India

- Location: Dibrugarh, Assam
- Coordinates: 27°28′45″N 94°54′53″E
- Type: Mausoleum

Boga Baba Mazhar, also known as Boga Fakir's Mazhar, is a Muslim place of worship situated in the central Panchali area of Dibrugarh city, within the Dibrugarh district of Assam. It serves as the shrine of the Sufi saint Syed Roshan Ali Chishti. Locally renowned as the Boga Baba, who migrated from Ajmer to Assam to preach Islam and eventually settled in Dibrugarh. Following his demise, he was buried at this location, and subsequently, his shrine was established there.

== Etymology ==
Syed Roshan Ali Chishti, also known as Boga Baba or Boga Fakir, was noted for his handsome appearance. He earned the epithet 'Boga Baba' or 'Boga Fakir' owing to his tall stature and fair complexion. Boga means white and Baba means father figure in Assamese. Subsequently, his Mausoleum came to be recognized as the Boga Baba Shrine or the Shrine of Boga Fakir.

== Legend ==
Sufi saint Syed Roshan Ali Chishti travelled from Ajmer, Rajasthan to Assam with the aim of introducing Islam. Initially residing in Uttar Pradesh for a period, he later moved to Assam. Belonging to the Chishtiya order of Sufism, Chishti, a tall figure with a fair complexion, is said to have arrived in Assam during the first half of the twentieth century on a white horse, clad in a woolen robe. He settled near the Dibrugarh Town railway station, living in a hut and possessing only a small cooking pot, from which he shared food with all who visited.

His presence attracted people of diverse religions, garnering widespread attention. Syed Rashan Ali Chisti passed away in the 1960s, and legend claims that ants covered his body after death. He was buried in his hut, which eventually became a shrine in his honor. Additionally, some locals believe that the Boga Baba shrine has a protective influence, preventing the Brahmaputra River from flooding the city of Dibrugarh.

== Tourism ==
The Boga Baba Mazhar stands as one of the most frequented tourist spots in Dibrugarh city, revered as a sacred site by Muslims and drawing visitors of various faiths. Pilgrims from different corners of the country converge at the Pir Boga Baba shrine, where they light candles and offer shawls. Many seek to have their prayers answered during their visit.

== Transportation ==
It is located at the heart of Dibrugarh city along Assam Trunk Road, the shrine of Boga Baba is positioned adjacent to the old Dibrugarh Town railway station. The Dibrugarh railway station lies 6 kilometers away, while the Dibrugarh airport is situated 16 kilometers from the shrine.It is maintained by Boga Baba Mazhar Committee.
