= D.H.S.K. Law College =

Law college in Assam, India

- Type: Private Law College
- Established: 1965 (61 years ago)
- Affiliation: Dibrugarh University
- Location: Dibrugarh, Assam, India

Dibrugarh Hanumanbux Surajmal Kanoi Law College is a private aided law school situated beside Red Cross Road at Khaliharmari in Dibrugarh in the Indian state of Assam. It offers 3 years LL.B. courses affiliated to Dibrugarh University. This college is recognised by Bar Council of India, New Delhi. D.H.S.K. Law College was established in 1965. D.H.S.K. Law College is the 2nd oldest law college in Upper Assam Division and 3rd in the Northeast India.
