= Raidongia Doul =

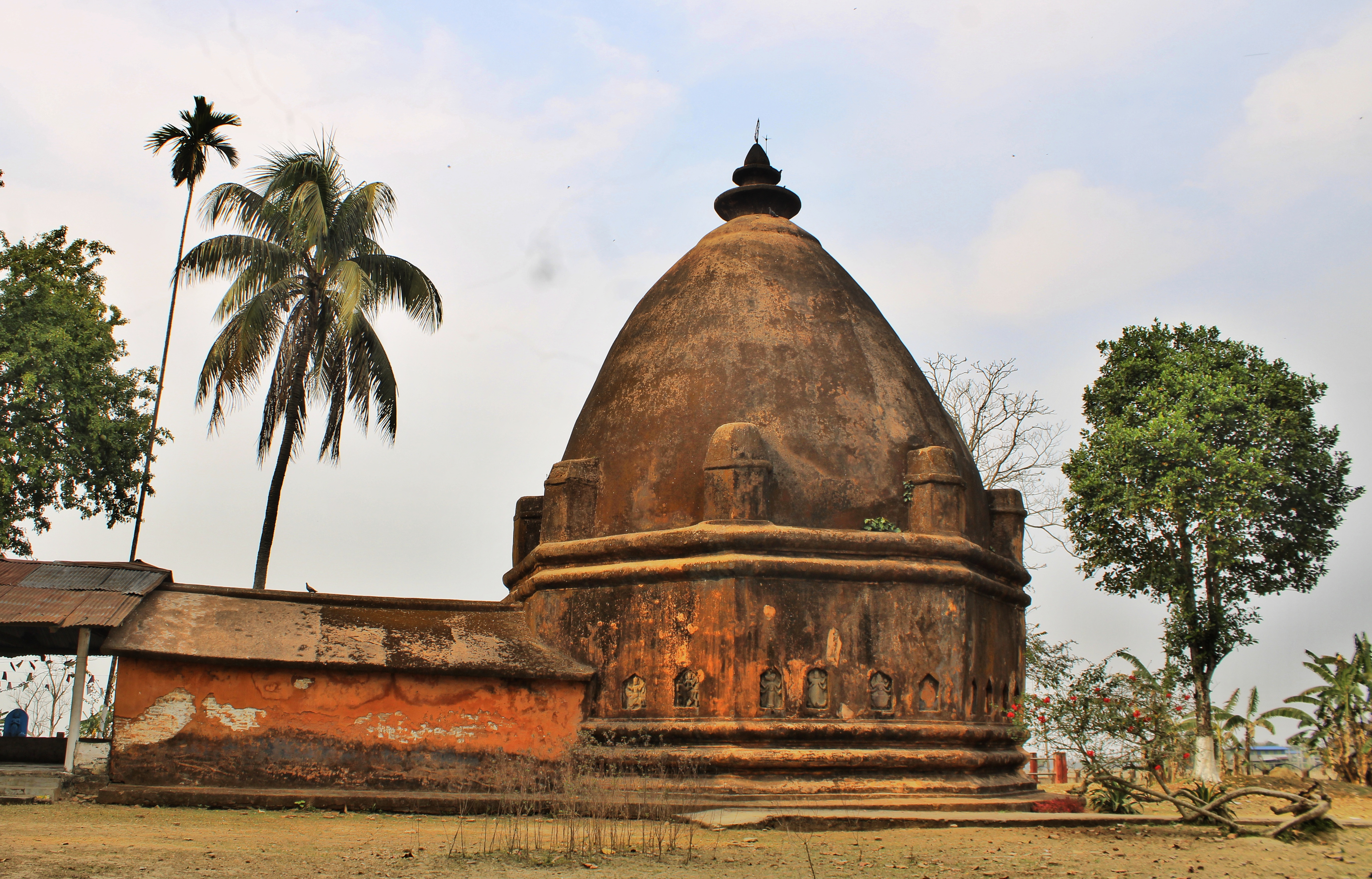
- View of the Raidongia Doul
- Interactive map of the Raidongia Doul area

General information
- Architectural style: Nilachal architecture
- Location: Dibrugarh, Assam, India
- Coordinates: 27.2825°N 94.7928°E
- Construction started: 1750; 276 years ago

Technical details
- Structural system: Bricks and Indigenous type of cement

Design and construction
- Main contractor: Pramatta Singha

Raidongia Doul or Raidongia Dol is a historical doul located in the Lejai-Kalakhowa area of Dibrugarh district. It was built in 1750 by the Ahom king Swargadeo Pramatta Singha (1744–1751). Initially it was a Devi Temple. Over time, a house was built near the doul and the people of the area started to worship Shiva. Therefore, the present doul is also known as Shiv Doul or Raidongia Shiv Doul. Its main festival is Maha Shivratri. The Archaeological Department of the Government of Assam has recognized the Raidongia Doul as a State Protected Monument.

== Location ==
The Raidongia Daul is located in Lejai Miripathar village under Larua Mouza of Barbarua Revenue Circle in Dibrugarh district. It is situated approximately 22 km from Dibrugarh. The temple is connected to the main road by a historical road known as Raidongia Road, which starts from Lejai-Kalakhowa road. The temple is situated on the north side of Raidongia Road and west of the main Lejai-Kalakhowa road.

== History ==
The foundation stone of the temple was laid in 1742 by Swargadeo Pramatta Singha (1744–1751) of the Ahom kingdom. The temple is known to have been offered as a dowry in the name of his beloved sister, Yamini, who was married to the Raidongia king, considered to be the head of the present Lejai region at that time. The doul was completed in the late 1750s with the cooperation of the local villagers. A total of 200 puras of land were dedicated to the temple. Along with the daul, a pond was also dug during that period. The pond is still next to the doul.

== Architecture ==
The Raidongia Daul is a combination of Ahom and Nilachal architectural styles. This doul is based on an octagonal altar. The main peak is 45 feet high and has eight small peaks surrounding the polygonal main peak. The walls of the main peak of the brick doul contain numerous sculptures depicting various gods and goddesses, giving clear representations of Matsya, Kurma, Varaha, Narasimha, Vamana, Parashurama, Rama, Krishna, Buddha, and Kalki respectively. There are also rock sculptures of Brahma, Vishnu and Lakshmi, as well as various forms of Goddess Durga. Traditional raw materials such as duck eggs, ground porridge, and Bora rice were used in the construction of the temple. The chakra located on the dome above the daul is marked with four projecting tridents. Additionally, there are numerous sculptures of gods and goddesses and Shivlings in the courtyard of the daul. There are 24 ancient relics and 14 statues of the Ahom kingdom.

== Tourism ==
The priest of the doul performs regular pujas dedicated to Lord Shiva. Every year, Maha Shivratri is celebrated here on the fourteenth day of the Krishna Paksha in the month of Phalguna according to the Hindu calendar. On this occasion, devotees and pilgrims from various parts of the country come here to seek the blessings of Lord Shiva. Surrounded by paddy fields, the doul is known as a habitat for various migratory birds. Its natural beauty fascinates visitors to the place.

It is located approximately 22 km from Dibrugarh city on the Lejai-Kalakhowa road and is well connected from Dibrugarh city. The Dibrugarh railway station is about 28 km away, and Dibrugarh Airport is about 37 km away.
