= Dibrugarh Govt. Boys' Higher Secondary School =

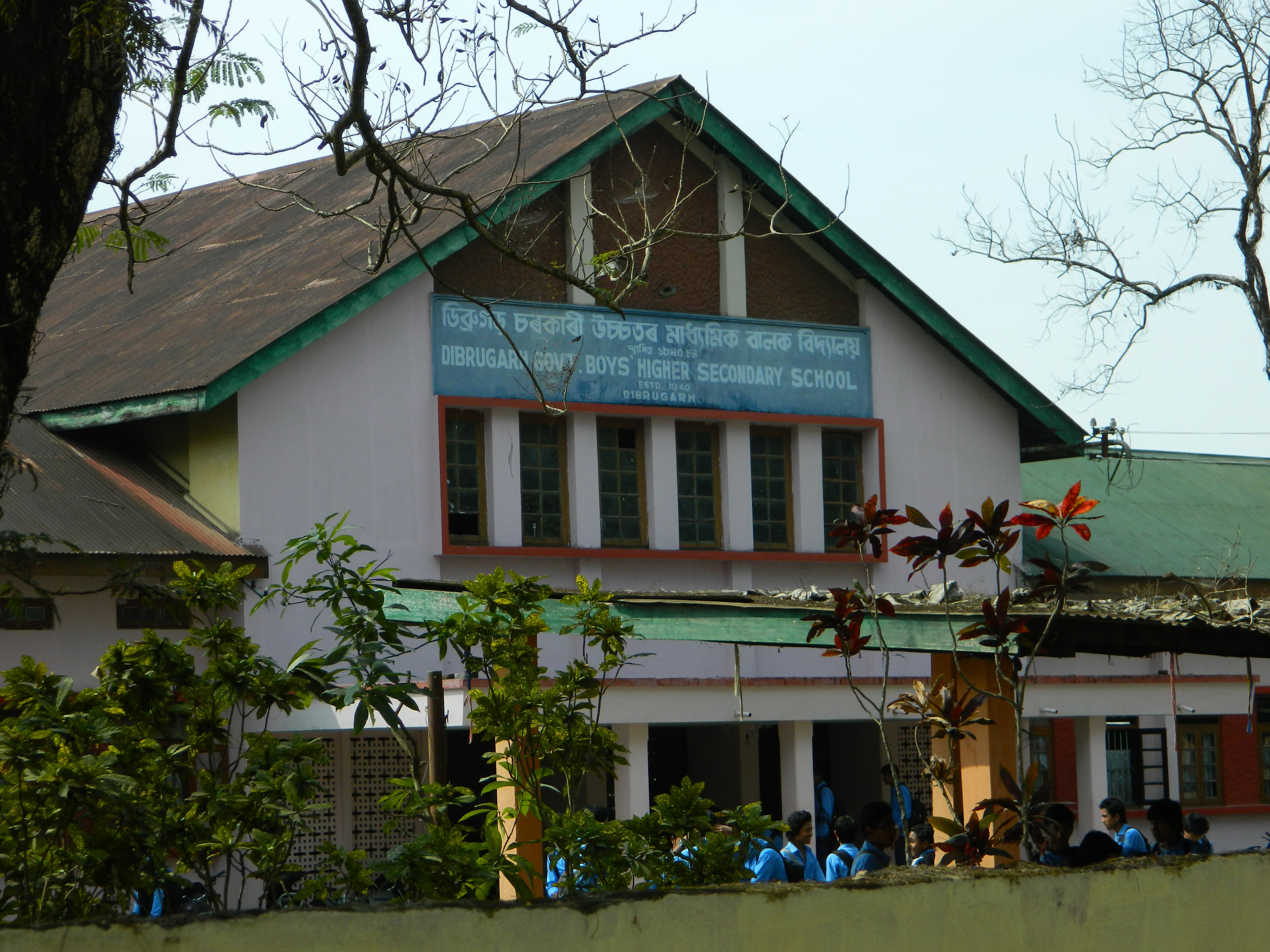

Location
- Milan Nagar, Dibrugarh, Assam; India; 27.464167°N 94.912500°E

Information
- Type: Public
- Motto: Education is Knowledge, Knowledge is Amrita
- Established: 1840; 186 years ago
- Campus: Urban
- Affiliations: SEBA & AHSEC

Dibrugarh Government Boys' Higher Secondary School was established in 1840 during the British colonial era in Dibrugarh. It is the oldest high school in Upper Assam. It has been relocated several times due to the damages caused by the 1897 and 1950 earthquakes. Now the school is situated at Milan Nagar, Dibrugarh beside the district library and museum. There are 56 staff and around 1600 students. The medium of instruction is Assamese. Students of the Govt.

Students at Government Boys' School appear for the High School Leaving Certificate (equivalent to the class 10 exam) under the Board of Secondary Education, Assam, and the Higher Secondary School Leaving Certificate (equivalent to class 12) under the Assam Higher Secondary Education Council. The school also organises sports activities.

In 2026, the residents protested turning the school playground into a parking and clearing area for the municipal garbage vans.
