= Deepak Fertilisers and Petrochemicals =

Indian chemical company

Deepak Fertilisers and Petrochemicals Corporation Limited
- Company type: Public
- Traded as: BSE: 500645; NSE: DEEPAKFERT
- Industry: Chemicals
- Founded: 1979
- Headquarters: Mundhwa, Pune, Maharashtra, India
- Key people: Chimanlal Mehta (Founder); Sailesh Mehta (Chairman)
- Products: Fertiliser, industrial chemicals
- Revenue: ▲₹11,300 crore (US$1.2 billion) (FY23)
- Net income: ▲₹1,120 crore (US$120 million) (FY23)
- Subsidiaries: Smartchem Technologies Ltd.; Deepak Nitrochem Pty Ltd. (Australia)
- Website: www.dfpcl.com

Deepak Fertilisers and Petrochemicals Corporation Limited (DFPCL) is an Indian manufacturer of industrial and agricultural chemicals, crop nutrients, and fertilisers.

== History ==
The company was established in 1979 by Chimanlal Mehta born in Jain family from Gujarat, as a private limited company and became public limited in 1982. The company has marketed fertilizers under the brand name of "Mahadhan" since 1990. The chairman of the company, Sailesh Mehta, is the son Chimanlal Mehta, who is also the founder of Deepak Nitrate, a chemicals company. Mehta is also the brother of Deepak Mehta, the chairman of Deepak Nitrate.

=== Restructuring ===
In January 2018, the company underwent restructuring after approval from National Company Law Tribunal (NCLT) and formed a wholly owned subsidiary Smartchem Technologies Ltd which covered the portfolios of fertiliser and technical ammonium nitrate. In July 2018, Smartchem reported sale of 35,000 tonnes in Maharashtra and Gujarat of their newly launched organic compound coated NPK complexes (Nitrogen (N), Phosphorus (P), and Potassium (K)) and branded as "Mahadhan Smartek".

== Products & services ==
=== Fertilisers and Petrochemicals ===
The company's products include nitric acid, low-density prilled ammonium nitrate, ammonium nitrophosphate (ANP), methanol and methanol-based resins, dry ice, isopropyl alcohol (IPA) and threose nucleic acid (TNA). DFPCL is one of the five major Indian companies that produce methanol.

==== Mining Chemicals ====
DFPCL is also a producer of Technical Ammonium Nitrate (TAN), which is used in the agricultural and chemical industries and as an explosive in the mining and infrastructure industries. Until 2014, imports of TAN from Russia and Ukraine in loose form were high. TAN has also been used by anti-social elements and naxalites in terrorism-related activities in combination with fuel oil to create the explosive product ANFO. The control and guidelines on TAN manufacturing and supply have since been made stringent by government. According to Indian Ammonium Nitrate Manufacturers' Association (IANMA), TAN market in India in 2012 was of nearly 650-700 thousand tonnes a year; and DFPCL sold 200 thousand tonnes although their installed capacity was nearly 500 tonnes per year. Conforming to stringent government regulations, DFPCL has introduced a GPS system for trucks transporting TAN to keep better surveillance.

==== Plants ====
Locations of corporate office and plants

The company has a corporate and registered office in Pune, Maharashtra and four productions plants in various locations in India:

- Srikakulam, Andhra Pradesh
- Taloja, Raigad, Maharashtra
- Dahej, Bharuch, Gujarat
- Panipat, Haryana

=== Real estate ===
The company owns a mall named Creaticity in Pune, Maharashtra, occupying a site of over 10 acres (4.0 ha) in area. The mall, previously called Ishanya, was renamed in 2018. Before the 2018 revamping, which cost around ₹10 crore (US$1.0 million), the mall focused on furniture. The mall now houses around 100 outlets selling home furnishings, food, beverages, entertainment and sports.

== Calamities ==
The company has faced shutdown due to 2005 monsoon floods when its Taloja plant was submerged. In May 2014, on the request of the Department of Fertilisers, the Petroleum Ministry stopped the supply of domestic natural gas to Taloja plant, citing the use of the cheap domestic gas to manufacture non-subsidised crop nutrients. DFPCL moved Delhi High Court against this move. DFPCL in June 2015 switched to imported RLNG as feedstock to avoid further loss of production.
