= Dirgheshwari temple =

Hindu temple in Assam, India

Dirgheswari Mandir
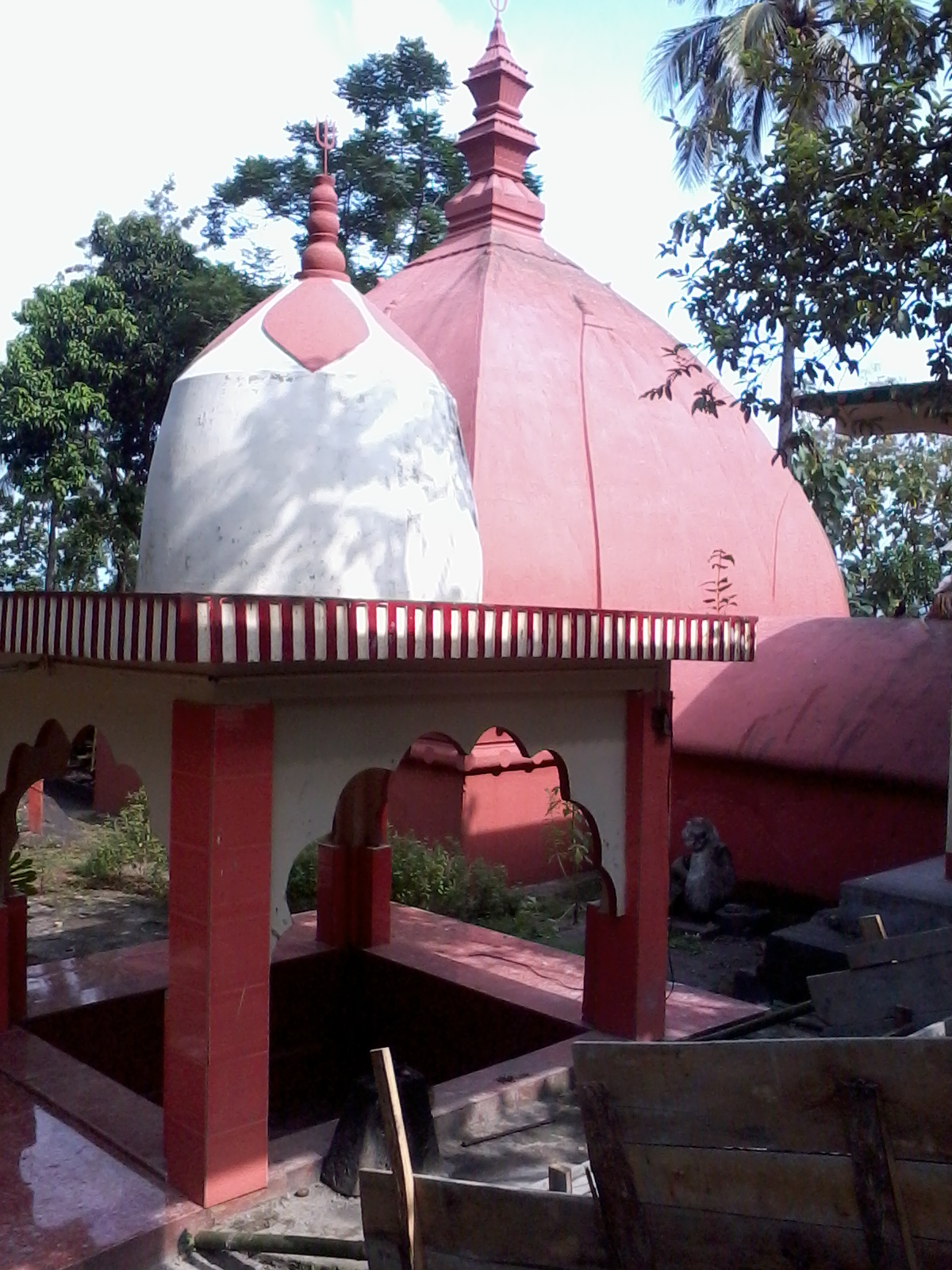
- View of Dirgheswari Mandir

Religion
- Affiliation: Hinduism
- District: Kamrup
- Deity: Sati

Location
- Location: North Guwahati
- State: Assam
- Country: India
- Interactive map of Dirgheswari Mandir
- Coordinates: 26°14′33.3″N 91°44′57.8″E

Architecture
- Type: Hindu Temple
- Creator: Tarun Duarah Borphukan

Dirgheswari Mandir (Assamese pronunciation: [dirɡʱeswori dewaloj]) is a temple situated in the northern banks of the river Brahmaputra in North Guwahati, Assam, India. Many ancient images made on rocks existed along with the temple. Brick temple was Built by Ahom king Swargadeo Siva Singha, Dirgheswari temple is considered as a Shakta pitha for Shakti worship. The main attraction of Dirgheswari temple is the annual Durga Puja celebrations, in which devotees from far of places use to attend.

== Legends ==
Since ancient times, Dirgheswari was a prominent place of Worship for the followers of Shakti cult of Assam. It is said that when Sati, the first wife of Lord Shiva died, Lord Shiva, in his grief was carrying her dead body around the world. In order to pacify Shiva, Lord Vishnu and other Gods decided to get rid of the body of Sati, which had become a source of sorrow for Mahadeva. Lord Vishnu instructed his disc, Sudarshan Chakra, to cut the body of Sati into several parts. The Sudarshan Chakra acted as instructed, and the pieces of Sati's body were scattered in different parts of the world. While her genitals fell in Nilachal Hill, on which the famous Temple of Kamakhya is situated, another body part of Sati fell in Sitachal hill. From that time onwards the place is considered sacred by the people.

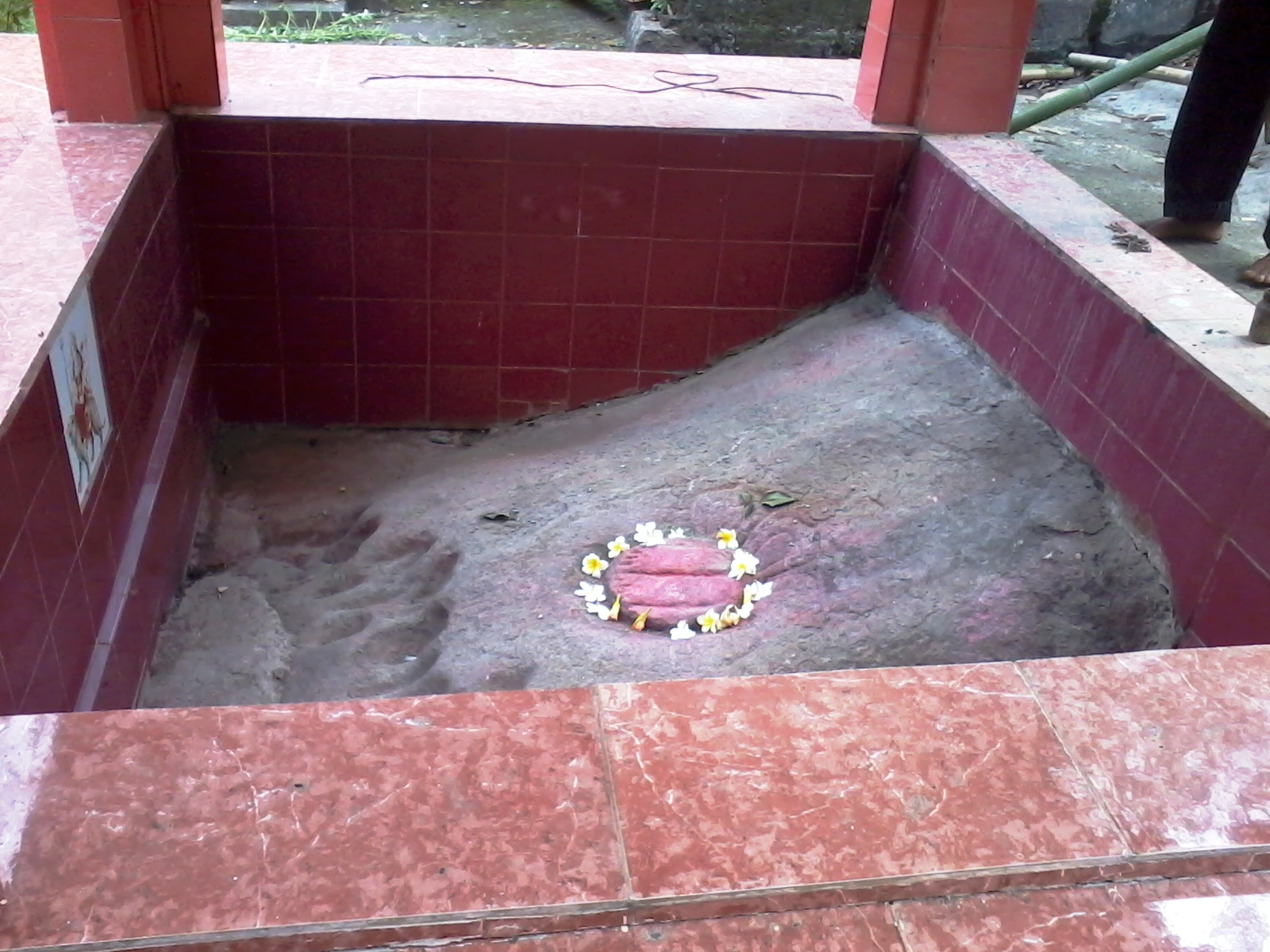
these foot prints are believed to be of Goddess Durga, Dirgheswari Temple

It is also said that the great sage Markandeya, one of the immortals according to Hindu tradition, visited this place and started huge penance of Goddess Durga. At last the Goddess appeared before him and grants him blessings. Thus Dirgheswari became an important place of worship of Goddess Durga.

Front Entrance of Dirgheswari Temple, built during Ahom reign in Assam

== History ==
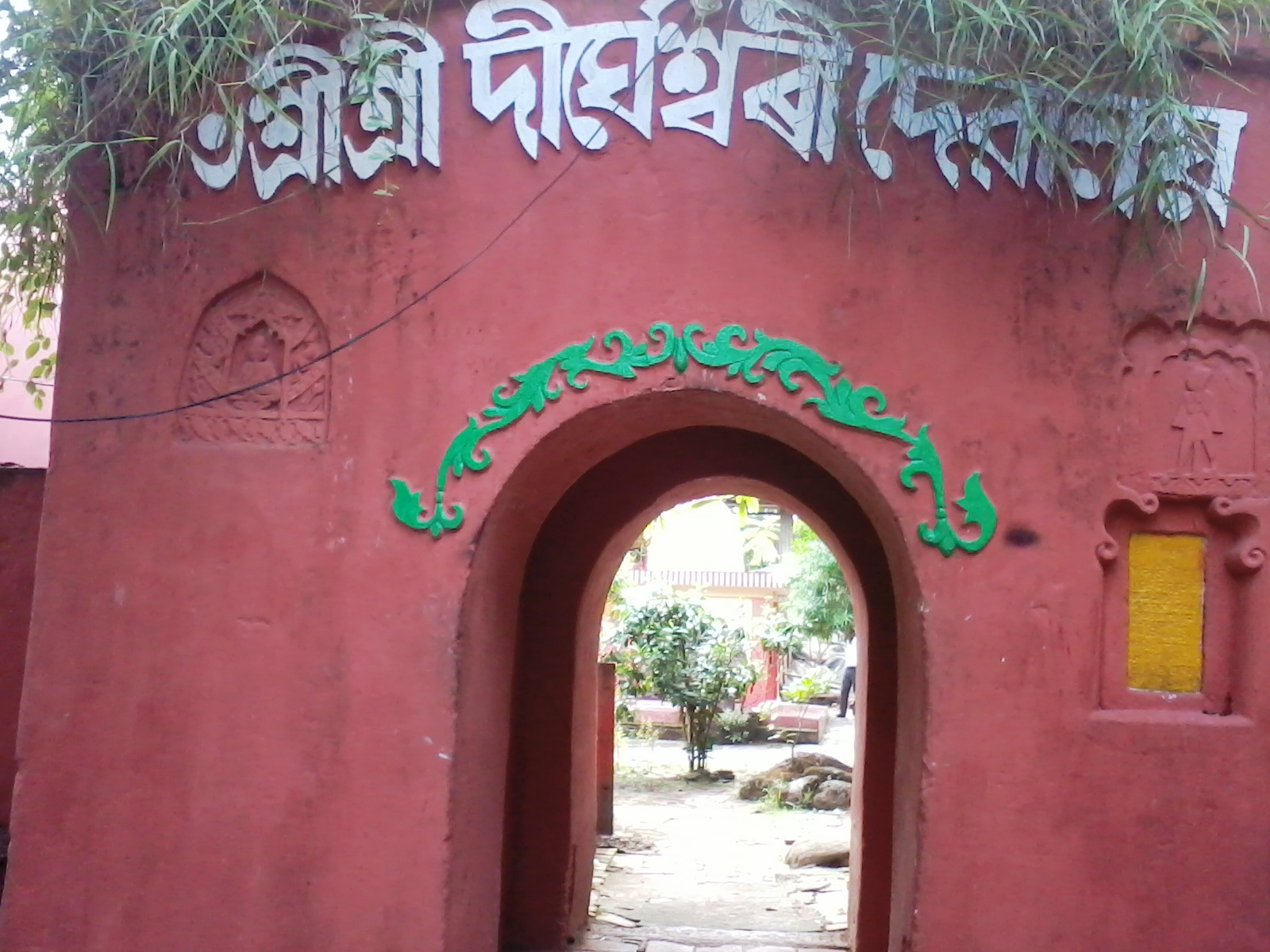
Entrance to Dirgheswari Temple

It is not known if any temple of Goddess Durga existed in Dirgheswari during ancient and early medieval period. The present temple at Dirgheswari was constructed by Ahom king Swargadeo Siva Singha reign 1714 CE-1744 CE, under the supervision of Tarun Duwarah Barphukan, the Ahom viceroy of Guwahati and Lower Assam. The temple was constructed using bricks, at the top of the hill, which is filled with solid rocks. The Garbha-griha or the inner chamber of the temple, where the idol of Goddess Durga was present is located underground, in a small cave.

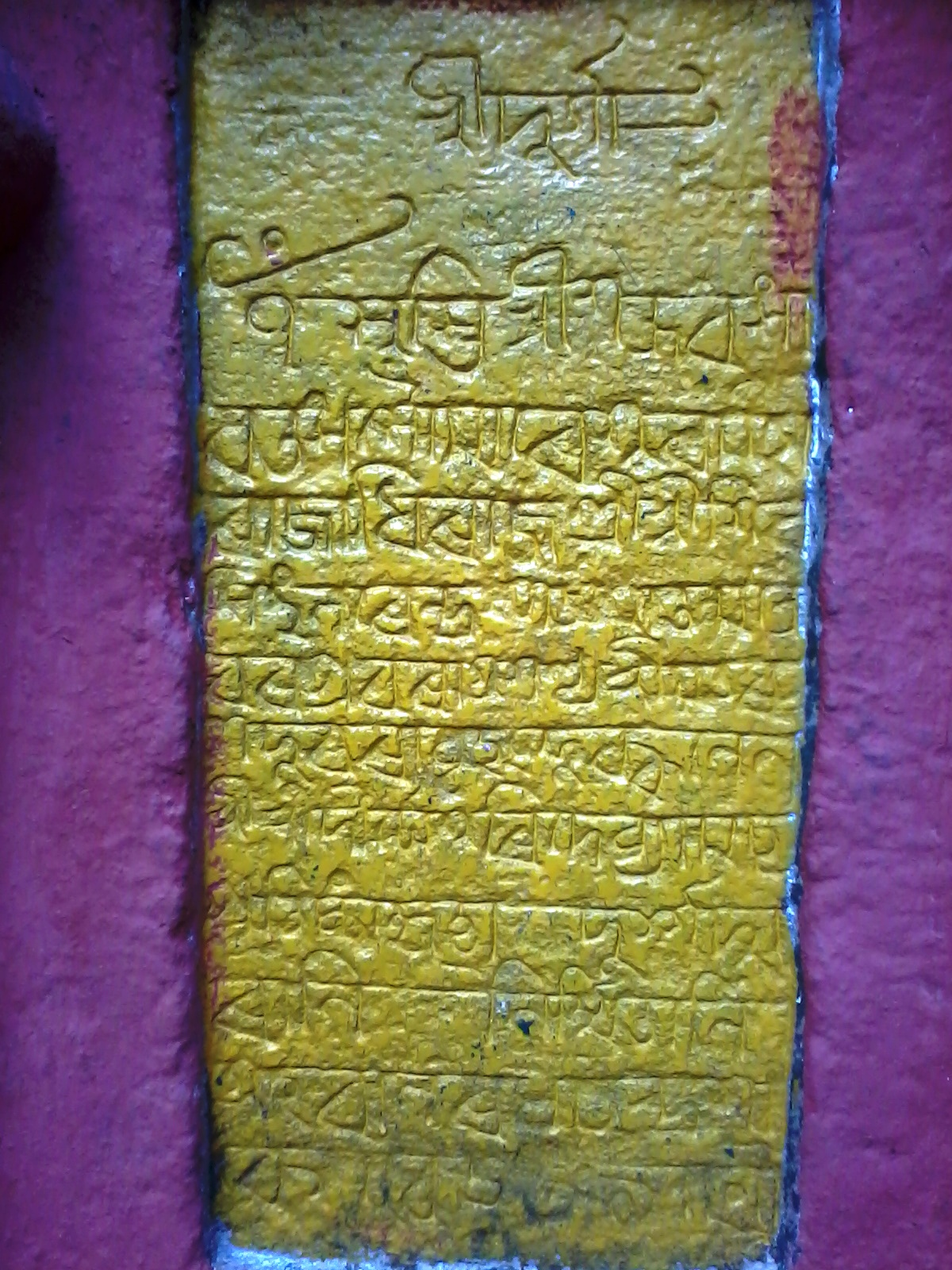
Stone inscription of Ahom King Siba Singha at Dirgheswari Temple

Lands were granted in the name of the temple and priests were appointed for the management of the daily functions of the temple. A rock inscription is present at the back entrance of the Temple in which the names of Ahom King Swargadeo Siba Singha and the Ahom Viceroy Tarun Duwarah Barphukan are present, issuing the royal order for the construction of temple and grants of lands in the name of Dirgheswari Temple. During the royal tour of Ahom king Swargadeo Rajeswar Singha in 1756 CE, the king visited the temple and granted more lands and men for the proper maintenance of the temple. The king also presented a silver Japi or hat, which is still used to cover the main idol of Devi Durga in the temple.

== Dirgheswari Mandir in Present day ==
After the end of Ahom rule and post colonial era, Dirgheswari Mandir has observed increased number of people attending the annual Durga Puja celebration. The prime attention of Dirgheswari Devalaya's Durga Puja is the sacrifice of animals, especially Buffaloes.

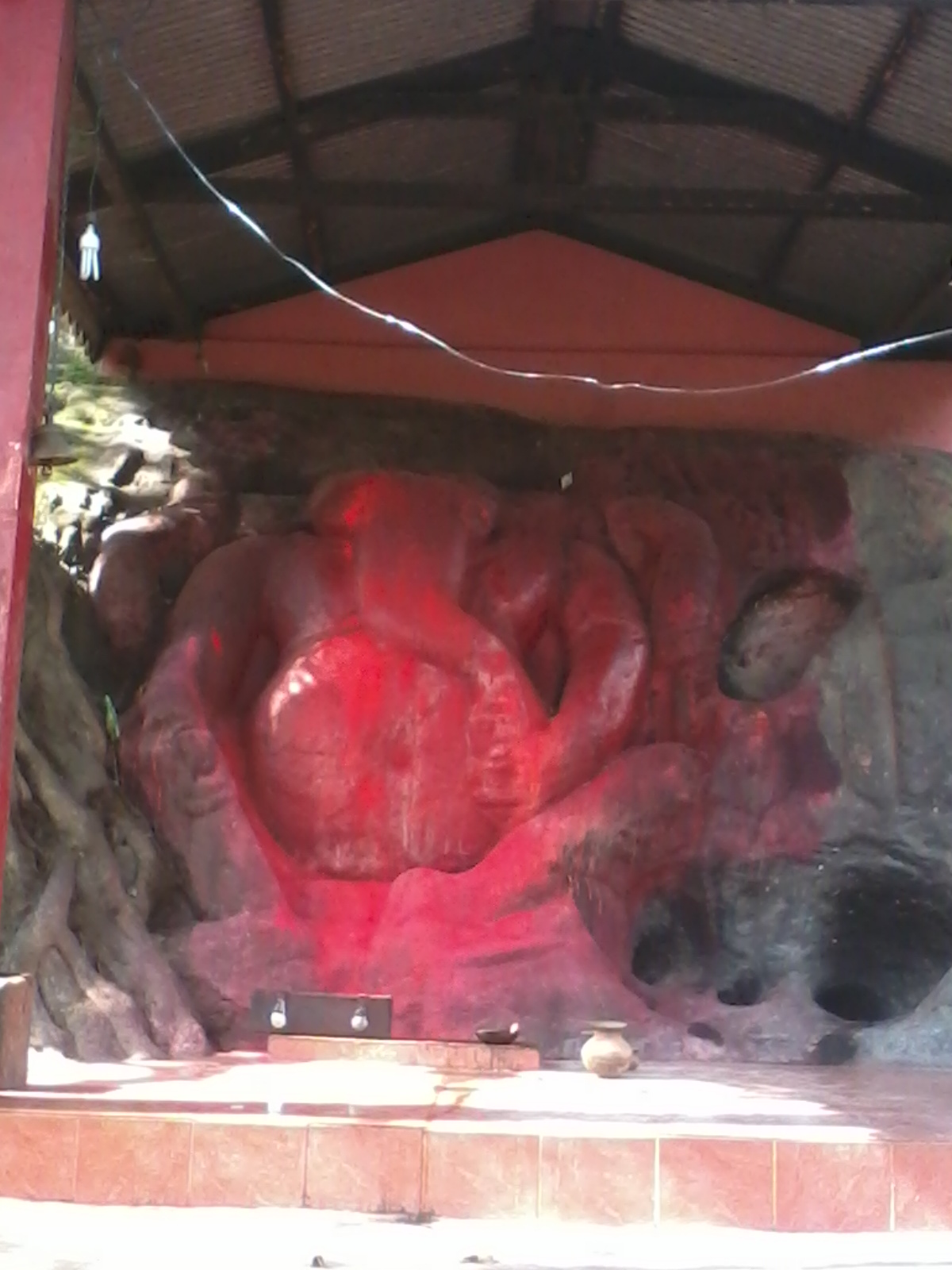
A big image of Ganesha in the rocks of the hill of Dirgheswari

Every year people from far of places use to visit Dirgheswari Temple to witness the animal sacrifice and Durga Puja celebrations. In order to accommodate the increasing numbers of pilgrims and other people, the temple compound is extended, due to which one portion of brick wall, constructed during the Ahom reign has to be brought down.

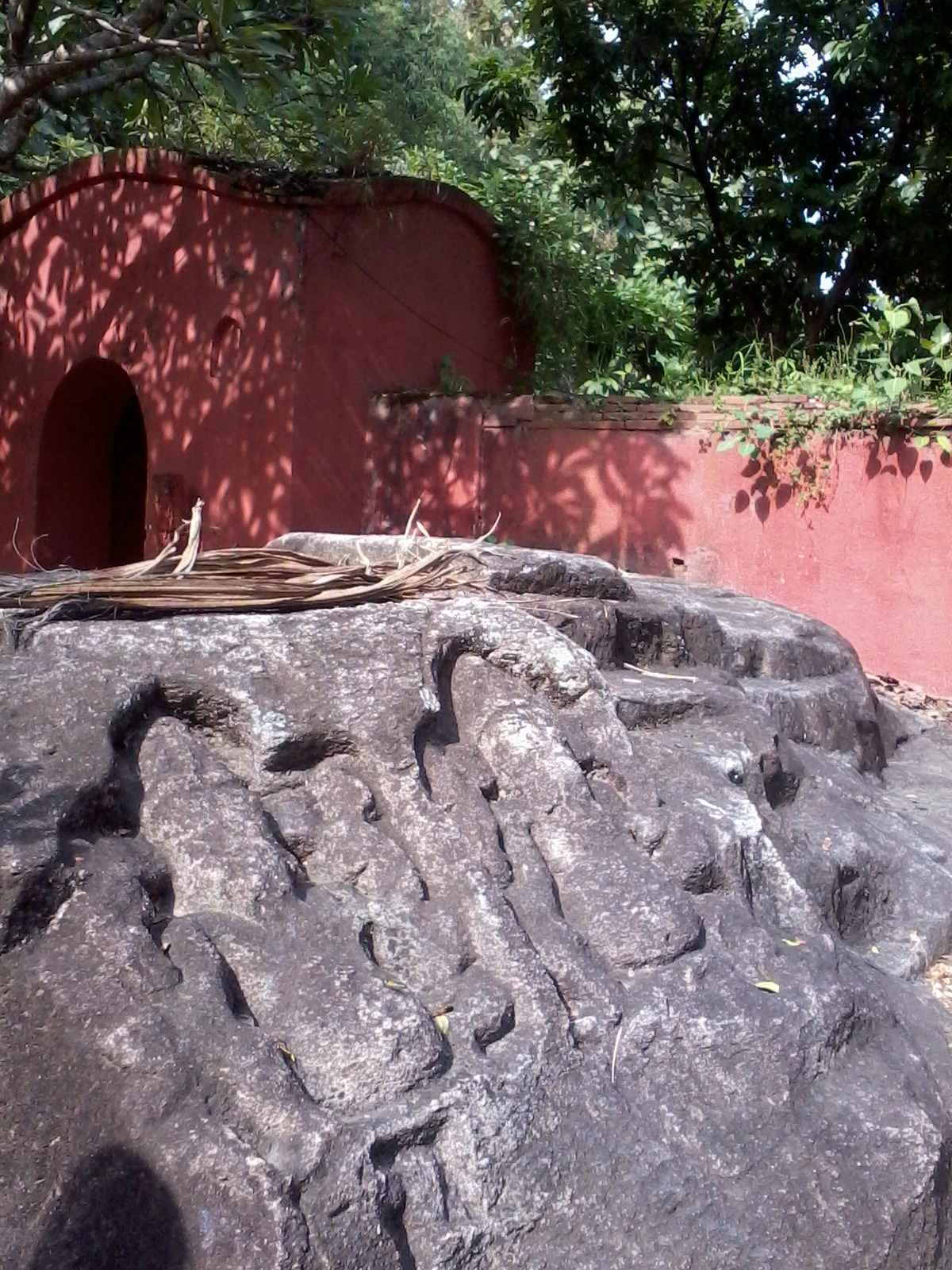
Images of Ganesha in Dirgheswari hill

There is a small water tank in the near the temple, in which small fishes and a turtle is present.

== Rock images ==
Apart from the temple, there are many images of God and Goddesses engraved in the rocks of the hill. It is not known from which period these images belonged.

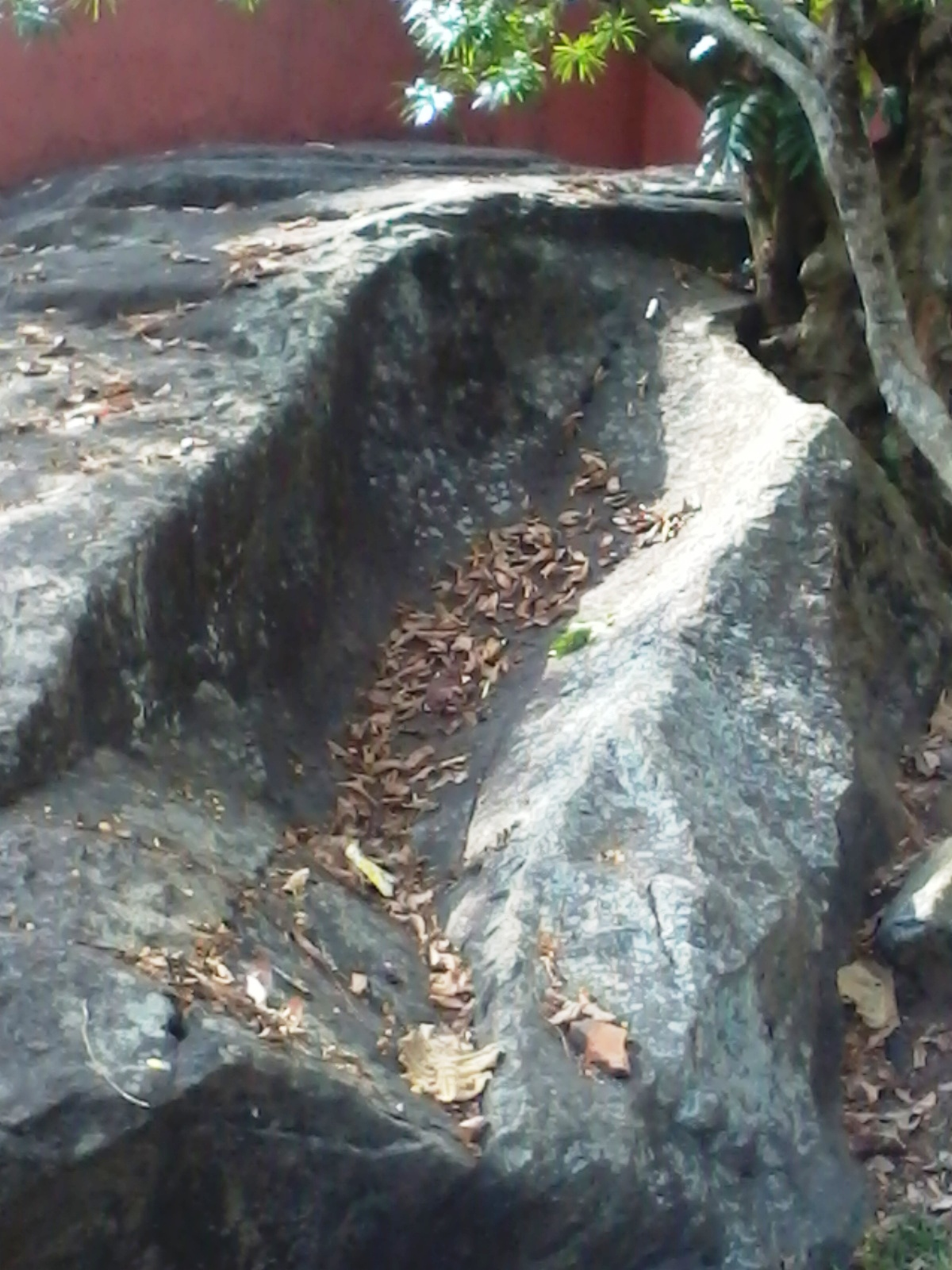
This structure in stone is believed by locals as the boat used by nymps from heaven for water sports in nearby pond

Just like any ancient temples or Hindu holy sites, one can find a big image of Lord Ganesha engraved in the rock, at the entrance of the temple. According to Hindu beliefs before performing any religious rites, first prayers should be offered to Lord Ganesha. There are two foot prints engraved in the rocks near the temple, believed to be of Goddess Durga. There is also a stone structure, which the local believes as boat, which is used by Apasaras or nymphs for water sports in a nearby water pond.

== Conclusion ==
Dirgheswari Mandir is recognized by Archaeological Survey of India (ASI) as an important historical site and accordingly steps are taken to preserves its structure. Local people considered it as the second-most holiest place after Kamakhya Temple. It is believed that even after offering one's prayer in Kamakhya, it is necessary to visit Dirgheswari Temple, to obtain the full blessing of Devi Durga. Dirgheswari temple can be considered as an important destination for tourists and admirers of historical monuments, in and around Guwahati.
