= Dibru–Sadiya Railway =

- Company type: Private
- Founded: 1881
- Defunct: 1945
- Headquarters: Dibrugarh, British India
- Area served: Dibrugarh and Tinsukia, Assam
- Services: Rail transport

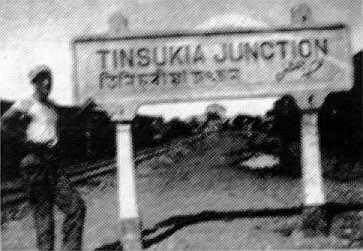
Tinsukia Junction, 1943

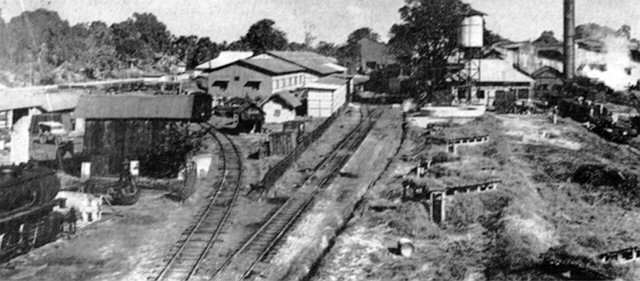
Dibrugarh Railway Yard, 1943

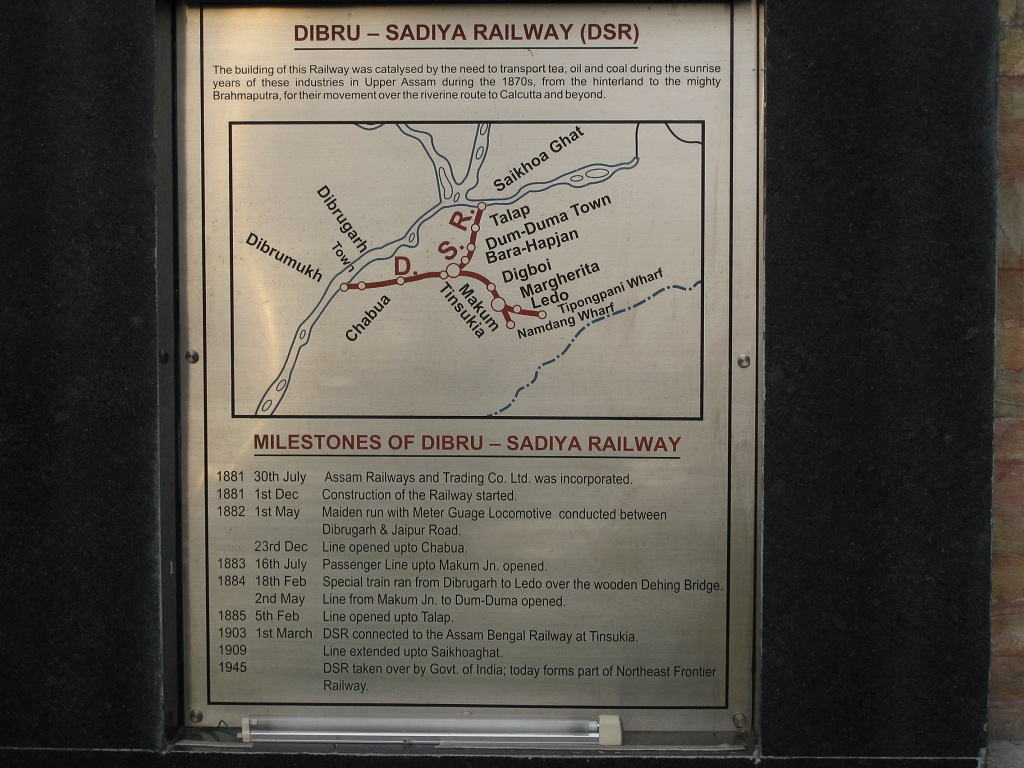
Dibru–Sadiya Railway plaque, Heritage Museum, Tinsukia

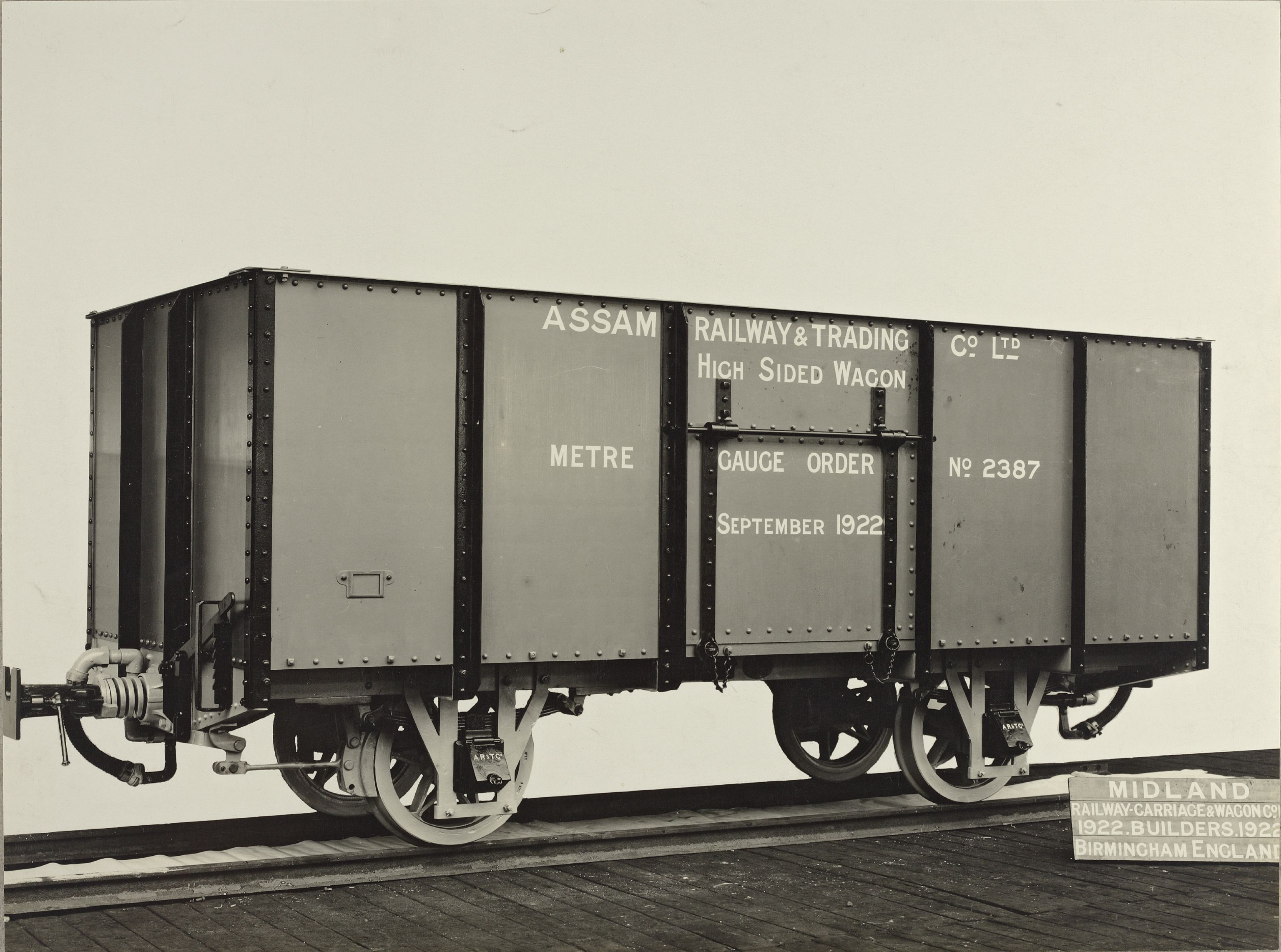
AR&TC mineral wagon built by MRC&W in 1922

Dibru–Sadiya Railway (DSR) was one of the pioneering railway companies in British India and the first railway service of Assam in north-east India.

== History ==
This metre-gauge railway was owned by Assam Railways and Trading Company (AR&TC), which was incorporated by John Berry White for transportation of coal, tea and public in the rapid growth of the tea industry. The first section of the line opened in 1882 from Brahmaputra River steamer ghat, Dibrugarh eastward, 15 miles. First train service had come into operation on 1 May 1882 from Dibrugarh's Mohanamukh to Jaipur. A 40 miles track between Dibrugarh and Makum was opened to traffic on 16 July 1883. The first railway junction in Assam was Makum Junction on the railway line that opened in 1884 to Dihing bridge. The railway was further extended in 1910 to reach Saikhoa giving a total line length of 149 kilometres (93 mi) including the Makum Branch. On 1 January 1942, the working was taken over by the Bengal and Assam Railway. The railway was later merged with North Eastern Railway zone in 1952.

== Rolling stock ==
In 1936, the company owned 33 locomotives, 66 coaches and 1617 goods wagons.

== Classification ==
It was labeled as a Class II railway according to Indian Railway Classification System of 1926.

== Conversion to broad gauge ==
The railway network was converted to 1,676 mm (5 ft 6 in) broad gauge in late 1990s.
