= Military railways =

Railways in military use

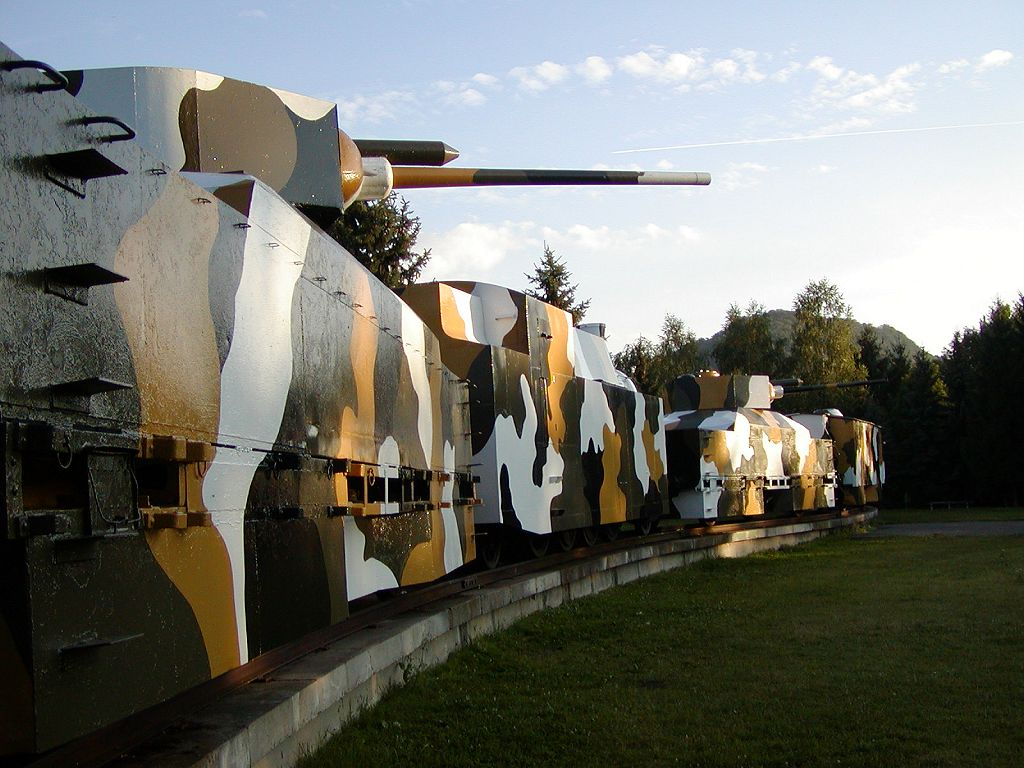
Armoured trains, like this Slovak example, are one form of military use of railways

The military use of railways derives principally from their utility in the field of logistics, and, less usually, on their use as a platform for military systems, like very large railroad guns and armoured trains, in their own right. Railways have been employed for military purposes in wartime since the Revolutions of 1848. Improvements in other forms of transport have rendered railways less important to the military since the end of World War II and the Cold War, although they are still employed for the transport of armoured vehicles to and from exercises or the mass transport of vehicles to a theatre of operations. The US Air Force developed the Peacekeeper Rail Garrison mobile ICBM in the 1980s, but it never reached operational status. Railways have played an important role in the logistics of the 2022 Russian invasion of Ukraine.

Due to the expense and time required to build specifically military railway networks, military use of railways is usually based on a pre-existing civilian railway network rather than a military-owned one. However, specialized military types of rolling stock have frequently been used. Military railway is usually built and operated by railway troops. Sometimes so called strategic railways are built where civilian considerations would not justify a line or not one built to those standards.

== Military railways ==
- Bicester Military Railway
- British military narrow gauge railways
- Fort Eustis Military Railroad
- Melbourne Military Railway

== Railways in war ==
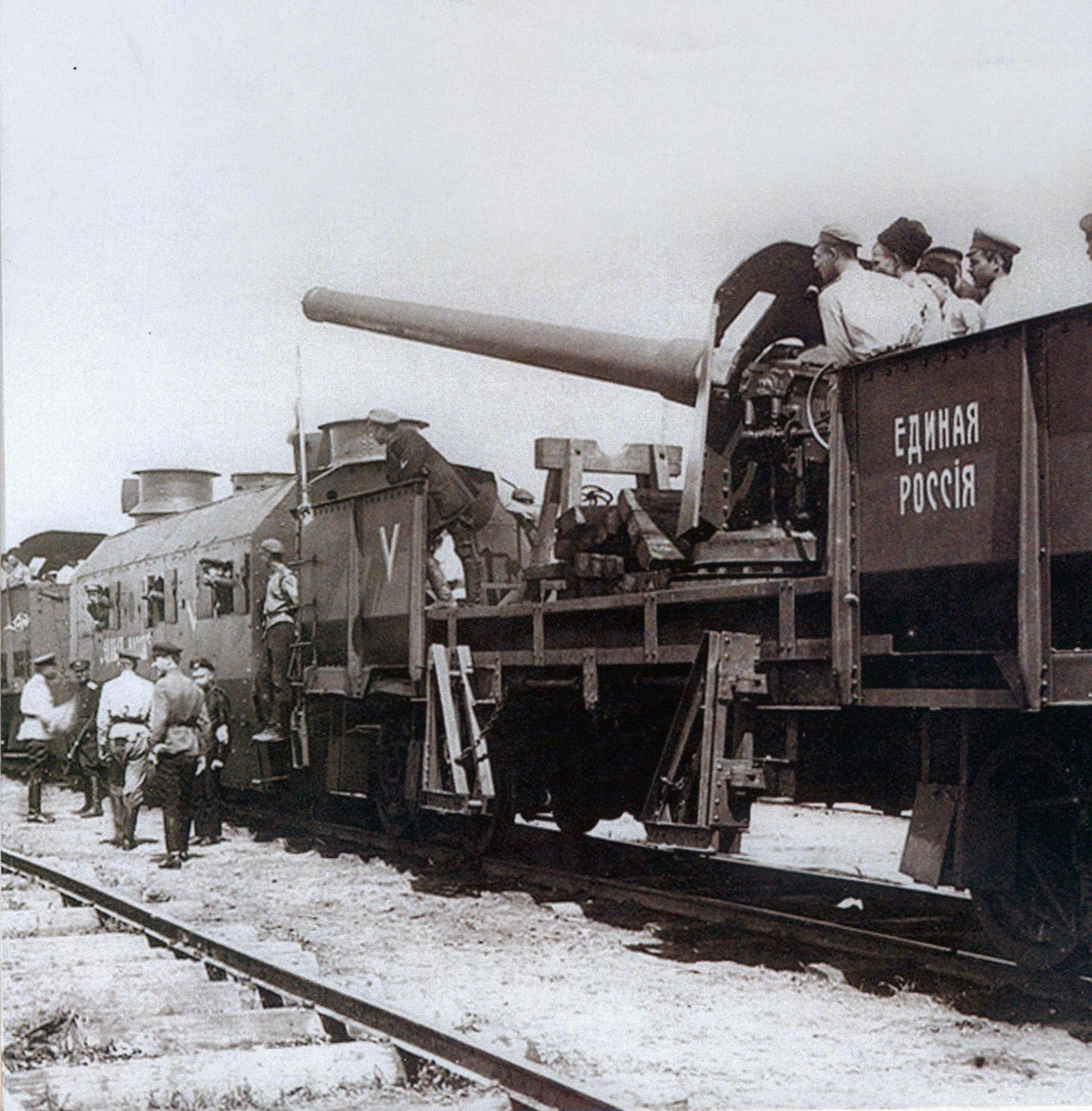
White Russian troops on a military train during the Russian Civil War, 1919

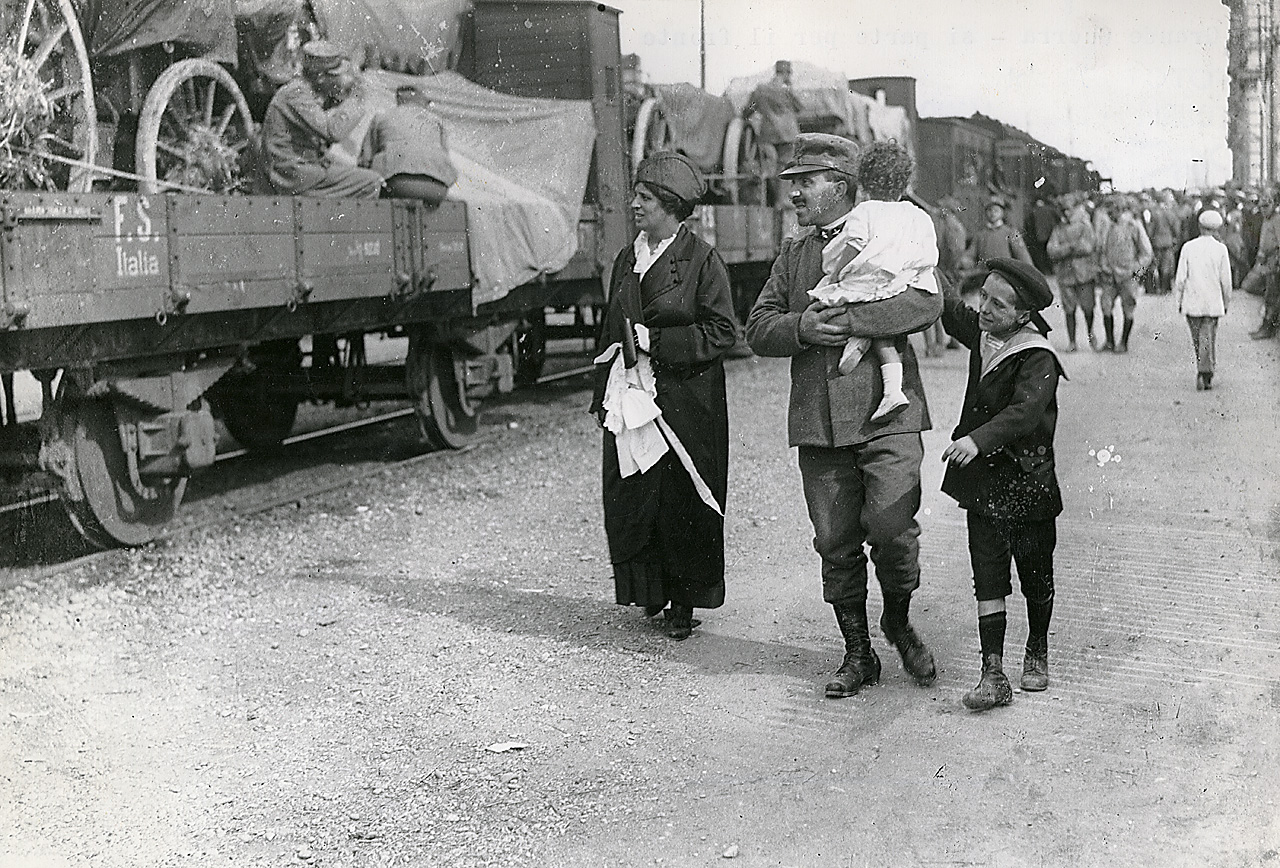
Italian soldier accompanied by his wife and two sons to the military railways, during World War I.

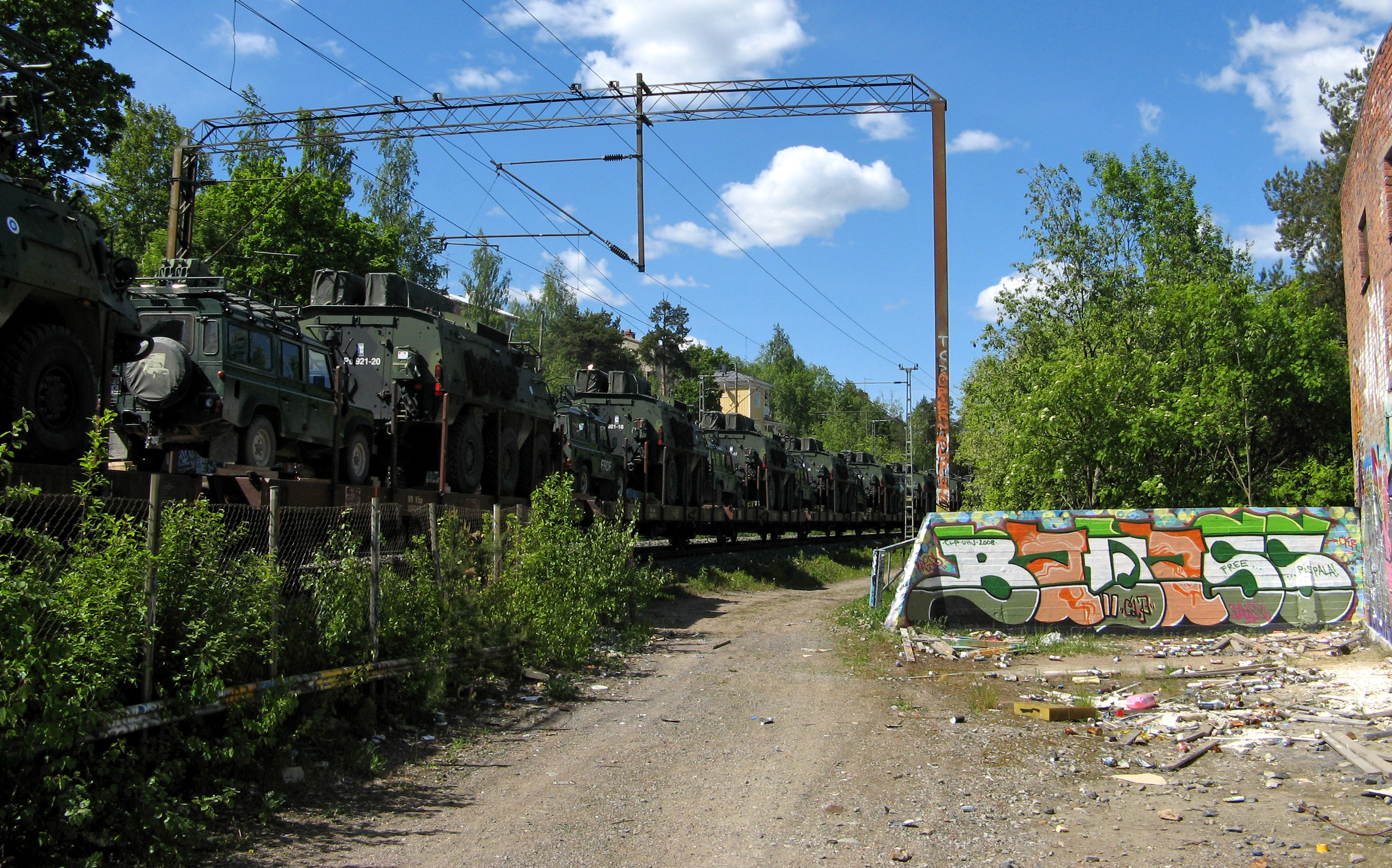
Finnish military vehicles being transported by train, 2008

=== Early Prussian use ===
The Kingdom of Prussia's VI Corps (some 12,000 men and their guns, horses, ammunition and other material) travelled on two railway lines to Kraków in 1846 in the wake of the Kraków Uprising. The Prussian Army used railways to move its forces during the First Schleswig War in 1849–1851. Three Prussian battalions were deployed by rail to crush the 1849 May Uprising in Dresden. The first Prussian regulations for transport of troops on state railways were issued in 1856. The Franco-Prussian War of 1870 to 1871 saw significant use of railways and railway-men in military service — as well as enemy saboteurs opposing them. The Royal Prussian Military Railway began service in 1875.

=== Hungarian Revolution of 1848 ===
In 1849, an Imperial Russian corps with all of its equipment moved by rail from Poland to Göding in Moravia to link up with the Austrian army during the Hungarian Revolution of 1848.

=== Crimean War ===
Military railways established a reliable supply to British Army troops besieging the city of Sevastopol from Balaklava during the severe winter of 1855 in the Crimean War. The Grand Crimean Central Railway, just 7 miles (11 km) long, was purpose-built.

=== Second Italian War of Independence ===
During the Second Italian War of Independence in 1859, the French Army moved 130,000 soldiers to northern Italy by rail. The Imperial Guard Corps from Paris and two corps from Lyon entrained to Toulon via rail, from where a total of 70,000 men were shipped to Genoa. The French I Corps was then ferried from Genoa to Novi by rail. Another two French corps were transported by rail to Savoy, where they crossed the Alps and boarded trains to Turin. To improve Piedmont's railway system, the French Navy shipped locomotives to Genoa. A French siege train was shipped from Marseille and Toulon to Genoa, from where it was moved by rail to Lombardy for use against Mantua in late June.

=== American Civil War ===
The American Civil War in 1861–1865 was the first large war in which railroads were both a major tool and a major target of military action. A few railroads were custom-built:

- United States Military Railroad rebuilt the City Point Railroad, extending to Petersburg during the Siege of Petersburg
- Confederate railroads in the American Civil War
- Centreville Military Railroad

=== Paraguayan War ===
In 1867 during the Paraguayan War some ironclad vessels of the Brazilian navy became trapped on the River Paraguay between the enemy Paraguayan forts of Curupaty and Humaitá. To keep them supplied with fuel, ammunition and provisions, the Brazilian ministry of marine ordered an emergency military railway to be built through the almost impenetrable coastal region of the Chaco. The sleepers of this line almost floated over the boggy ground. This supply line was known as the Affonso Celso, and sustained the ironclads in their precarious position for six months, until they were able to dash past the Fortress of Humaitá in an incident known as the Passage of Humaitá.

=== Russian Eurasia ===
The Trans-Siberian Railway (Транссибирская железнодорожная магистраль - Транссиб), before 1917 was called the Great Siberian Route (Великий Сибирский Путь). First construction began on 19 May [N.S. 31 May] 1891. Russia used the almost-completed line in the Russo-Japanese War of 1904 to 1905; and troops of the Siberian intervention and Czechoslovak Legion used it during the Russian Civil War of 1917 to 1922.

=== Mahdist War ===
In 1896-98 during the Mahdist War, Kitchener built the Sudan Military Railroad, extending the Egyptian railways into the Sudan.

=== World War I ===
Early deployments of World War I relied to a large degree on the speed of military mobilization using railways. The German Schlieffen Plan called for rapid deployment using an extensive network of strategic railways to crush French forces before Russia could mobilize. However, ultimately this failed as Russia mobilized more quickly than Germany had anticipated, and Germany's offensive on the Western Front ground down to stalemate and trench warfare. The resulting unprecedented heavy use of artillery required transport on an unprecedented scale, and both sides on the Western Front quickly developed narrow-gauge military trench railways to service their forces.

=== Russian Civil War ===
During the Russian Civil War of 1917 to 1922 troops and supplies often moved around quickly within the length and breadth of the former Russian Empire. The Czechoslovak Legion came to dominate much of Siberia though its control of the Trans-Siberian Railway at times in the period from 1918 to 1920. Armoured trains saw extensive use. The practice of what Soviet historians called "echelon warfare" (Russian: эшелонная война, romanized: eshelonnaja vojna) relied on railways for attacking.

=== World War II ===
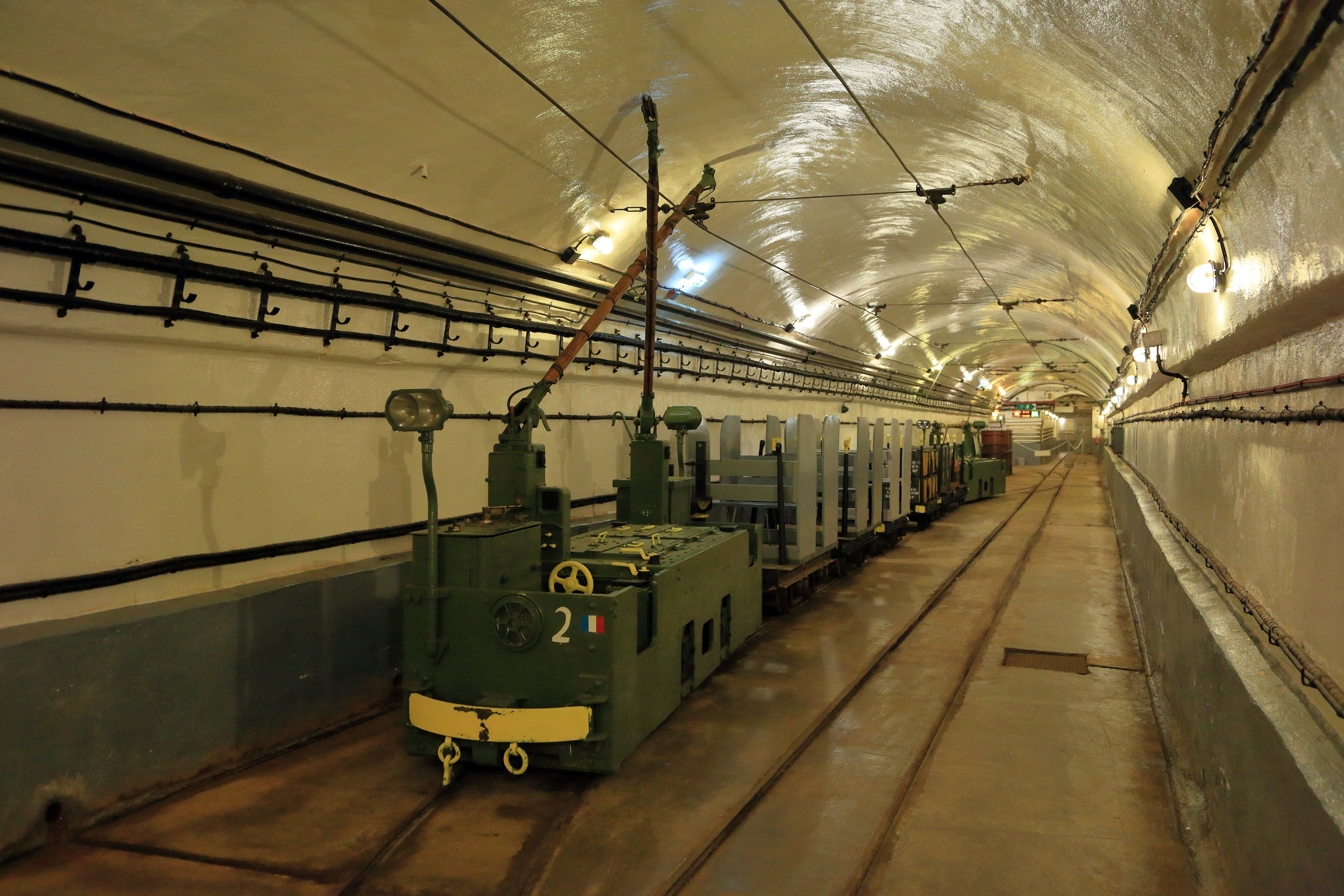
A railway connected forts of the Maginot Line. It had little use in the war.

German military transport mostly depended on trains and horses in World War II. Resistance units engaged in railway sabotage. Senior personnel used special military trains, for example Adolf Hitler's Amerika and Hermann Goering's Asien; trains were protected by railcars with anti-aircraft guns German: Flakwagen.

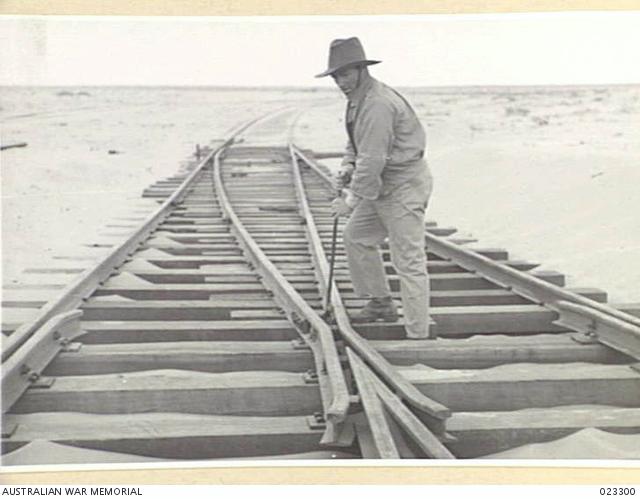
A member of the Royal Australian Engineers bolting rails on a section of the railway line constructed in the Suez Canal zone, January 1942.

German bombing of Polish railways contributed greatly to the swift success of the 1939 invasion of Poland. In turn, losses due to air attacks on Deutsche Reichsbahn in 1944 severely handicapped German logistics.

Japan built several railways for military purposes, notably the Burma-Siam Railway, known as the Death Railway because of the number of Allied prisoners-of-war and Asian labourers who died in constructing it.

Allied units expanded the existing Northeast Indian Railways to supply China via the Ledo Road. Railway lines were also constructed by the Allies in the Suez Canal area.

== See also ==
- Central Asian Military railway
- Decauville railway
- Feldbahn
- Heeresfeldbahn - German and Austrian military railways
- Hospital train
- Longmoor Military Railway - training school
- Military road
- Railway troops
- Russian Railway Troops
- Strategic railway
- War Department Light Railways

== Bibliography ==
- Schneid, Frederick C. (2012). The Second War of Italian Unification 1859–61. Oxford: Osprey. ISBN 978-1-84908-787-2.
