= Shingbwiyang =

Shing Bwi Yang ရှင်ဗွေယန်မြို့
- Town
- Location in Myanmar
- Coordinates: 26°40′N 96°13′E
- Country: Myanmar
- State: Kachin State
- District: Tanai District
- Township: Tanai Township

Population (2014)
  - Total: 11,453
- Time zone: UTC+6.30 (MST)

Shingbwiyang [Shing Bwi Yang/Tawa], Kachin State, is a town in Burma. The town was located in the China Burma India Theater during World War II, and the Ledo Road and an airbase were built there during this period. It is also known as Tawa Gaq (a local Naga term). There are 90 permanent people living in the township of Naga. It is linked to Tarung, a large Naga village adjoining Tanai Town, and to the north-west links with Nanyun (Taiyawng) Town.

On October 24, 1943 the 38th and 22nd Divisions of the second Chinese Expeditionary unit X Force saw their first combat fighting the Imperial Japanese Army in the town and on October 29, they successfully captured the village.
