= North-east Indian railways during World War II =

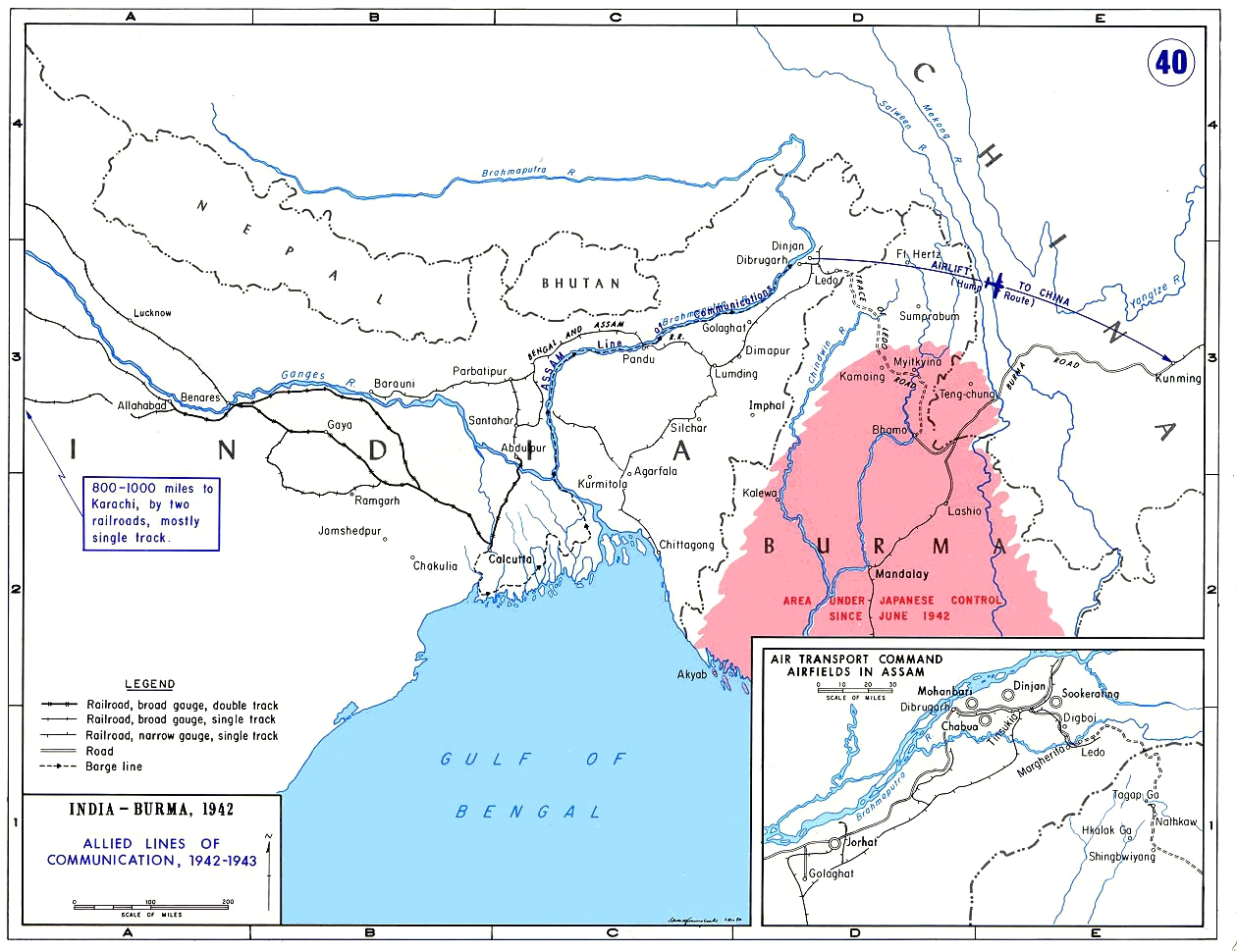
Allied lines of communication in South East Asia (1942–43).

The efficient running of the North-east Indian railways during World War II became critical to the success of the Allied war effort in the South-East Asian Theatre.

At the start of the War the railways and water communications of north-east Indian Railways was not a major concern for the British Empire forces stationed in Burma as they could be supplied by sea through port in Rangoon (as could Chinese forces in south western China thought supplies passing up the Burma Road). However, when the Japanese attacked and forced the British back to the Indian Burmese border, the supply of material over the extended lines of communication from Calcutta to the front lines and over the Hump into China, became a critical issue for the Western Allies and the Chinese National Revolutionary Army (NRA) under the command of Generalissimo Chiang Kai-shek. War time expediency, investment and ingenuity increased rail tonnage from around 600 tonnes a day to over 7,300 by January 1946.

== History ==
In the initial phase of the war the Japanese advanced north from Rangoon through Burma forcing Allied forces to retreat into the mountains on the Indian Burma frontier. In doing so, not only did the Japanese threaten India, but they denied use of the Burma Road to the Western Allies, who had been sending supplies to Chiang Kai-shek's National Revolutionary Army (NRA) by that route.

Behind this frontier, there was a series of railways in India which were essential to supply the Allied armies with logistics. They ran from the port of Calcutta to the hill station of Ledo in Assam. These logistics were not only needed by the British Fourteenth Army, and the American and Chinese troops at the end of the line under the command of General Joseph Stilwell's Northern Combat Area Command, but also Allied forces in China.

Allied forces in China consisted of Chiang Kai-shek's NRA, and American units based in China such as those involved in Operation Matterhorn. Allied forces in China were supplied by an airlift, over the Hump of the Himalayas, from the airfields (Ledo Airfield and perhaps few other) built close to the north east end of the railway, towards the end of the war this was supplemented by the use of the newly built Ledo Road which started close to the railhead in Ledo.

From port of Calcutta a broad gauge railway ran for 235 miles (378 km) to Parbatipur. Here goods had to be tran-shipped on to a metre-gauge train. This wandered 215 miles (346 km) up the Brahmaputra Valley to a ferry at Pandu which is 450 miles (720 km) from Calcutta. Once ferried across the river the train continued to Dimapur over 600 miles (970 km) from Calcutta. This was the main supply depot for the Fourteenth Army. If the supplies were destined for the Northern Combat Area or trans-shipment on to China, they had to be sent an additional 200 miles (320 km) to Ledo which is over 800 miles (1,300 km) from Calcutta.

The line had been built to serve the tea plantations of Assam and had a peacetime capacity of 600 tonnes a day. By the time the Fourteenth Army was formed in late 1943 this had risen to 2,800 tonnes. Up to Dimapur there were two other options, roads and river which could be used to supplement the rail tonnage. But there was no road to Ledo.

In early 1944, the American Army provided six battalions of dedicated railway troops, about 4,700 men. By October 1944 they had raised the capacity to 4,400 tonnes and by January 1946 to 7,300 tonnes a day. This was possible by the increase in staff from two British, or Indian, officers to twenty seven experienced American railroad men on the same length of line and the introduction of more powerful American and Canadian locomotives. Without the trebling of capacity, the supply of Chinese troops in China would not have been possible once the Japanese attacked India and the Fourteenth Army counterattacked.

It was possible to reach the Northern Front by river from Calcutta through the Sunderbans and then up the main stream of the Brahmaputra to Dibrugarh a distance of 1,136 miles (1,828 km). For the Central (Assam) Front the river port at Gauhati could be used, but from there supplies had to travel over the already congested metre-gauge railway to Dimapur. The Southern Front could be reached by a combination of broad-gauge railway, river-steamers and then a metre-gauge railway which ended at Dohazari railhead.

To move supplies from the railheads to the Army fronts three all weather roads were constructed in record time during the autumn (fall) of 1943:

- The Ledo road in the north which went on to connect to the Burma road and supply China.
- The campaign winning Central Front road from Dimapur to Imphal.
- The southern road from Dohazari south of Chittagong for the advance to Arakan.

Much of the labour for the two British roads and for constructing the many airfields was done by the 40,000 labourers contributed by the Indian Tea Association who organised and managed them.

I remember once saying "Well, that railway's been washed away by floods, put out by bombing, swept away by landslides, closed by train wrecks; there's not much more that can happen to it." But there was. We had an earthquake that buckled the rails and shifted bridges over a hundred miles of it.

— Field Marshal Bill Slim.

== See also ==
- Burma Campaign
- South East Asia Command
- The Stilwell Road (film) featuring Ronald Reagan
