= Strategic railway =

Railway primarily for strategic military purposes

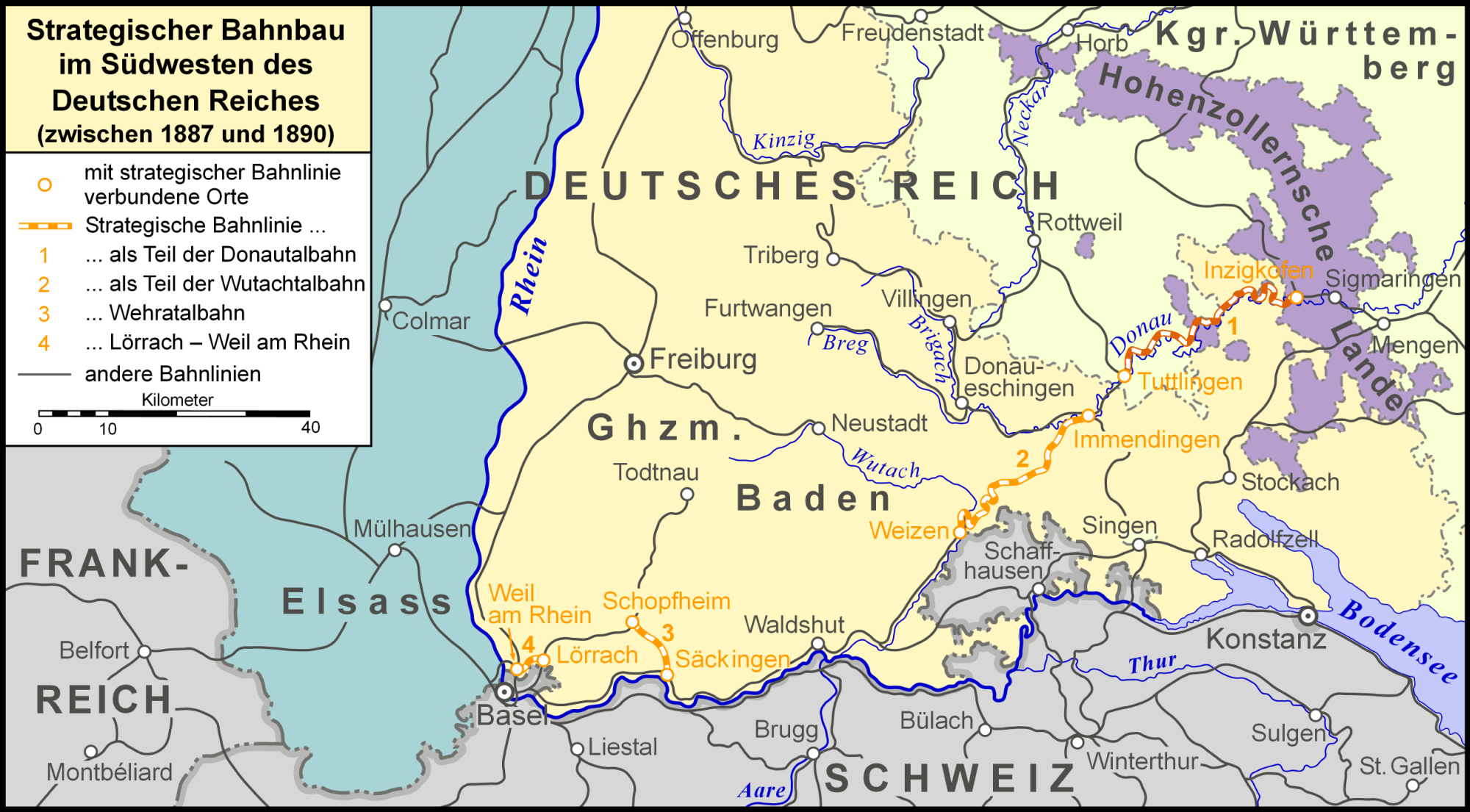
Map depicting strategic railway construction in southwestern Germany between 1887 and 1890.

A strategic railway is a railway proposed or constructed primarily for military strategic purposes, as opposed to the usual purpose of a railway, which is the transport of civilian passengers or freight. Although the archetypal strategic railway would be one constructed solely as part of a military strategy, such a railway is purely theoretical. Thus, a strategic railway is, in practice, one for which any intended or contemplated civilian purpose is subordinate to the military strategic purpose.

Strategic railways are not to be confused with military railways, which can take several different forms. A military railway is established or operated not as a strategic measure, but for tactical, training or logistical purposes. However, it is possible for a railway to be proposed or constructed for more than one military purpose, including a strategic purpose. An example of such a railway is the notorious Burma Railway of river Kwai fame, the hasty construction of which was as much a strategic measure as a tactical one.

Apart from the Burma Railway, the best known of all strategic railways is probably the so-called Kanonenbahn (English: Cannons Railway), which linked Berlin with Metz, and was opened progressively between 1850 and 1882. As its name suggests, the Kanonenbahn was intended primarily to facilitate the movement of soldiers and materiel, including cannons, from central Prussia towards eastern France, during an era of diplomatic tension and warfare between the two countries.

Although most of the world's strategic railways had been constructed, not always to completion, by the end of World War II, a number of additional strategic railways were built and operated in eastern bloc countries during the Cold War. Progressive changes in military technology, combined with the always high cost of constructing heavy rail systems, make it much less likely that a strategic railway would be constructed in the 21st century than in the 19th or 20th century. However, western and Indian observers have accused China of having military-strategic goals when constructing the Qinghai–Tibet railway or another high speed rail line through sparsely settled territory to Ürümqi in the region of Xinjiang.
