= Wanding =

Wanding 畹町镇
- Town
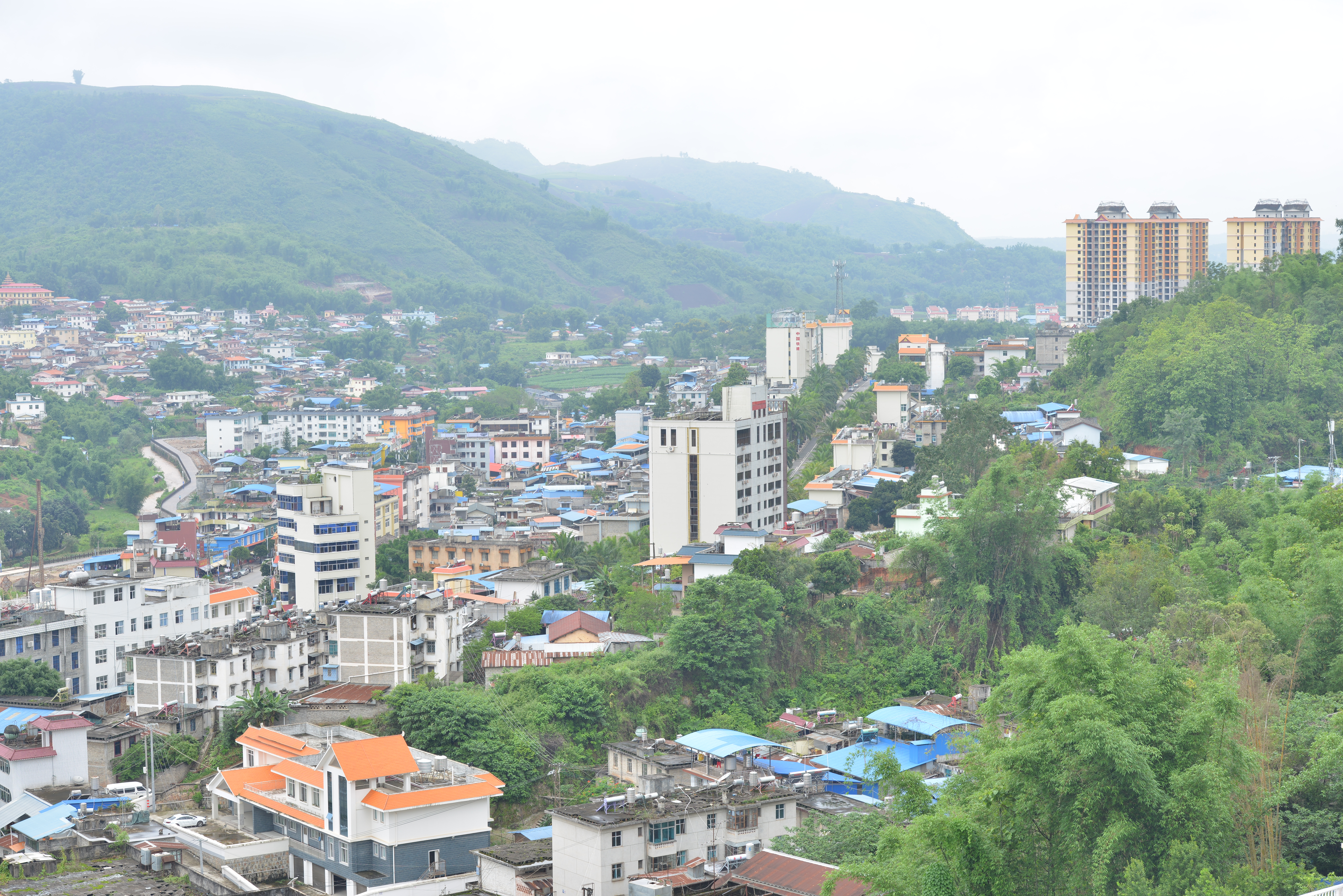

- Location in Yunnan
- Coordinates: 24°05′N 98°04′E
- Country: People's Republic of China
- Province: Yunnan
- Autonomous prefecture: Dehong Dai and Jingpo Autonomous Prefecture
- County-level city: Ruili

Area
  - Total: 103 km^{2} (40 sq mi)
- Elevation: 830 m (2,720 ft)

Population (2010)
  - Total: 13,906
  - Density: 135/km^{2} (350/sq mi)
- Time zone: UTC+8 (China Standard)
- Postal code: 678600
- Area code: + 86

Wanding (simplified Chinese: 畹町镇; traditional Chinese: 畹町鎮; pinyin: Wǎndīng Zhèn; Tai Nüa: ᥝᥢᥰ ᥖᥥᥒ ᥓᥫᥢᥱ lit. "the sun shining overhead"), formerly romanized as Wanting, is a frontier town in Ruili City, Dehong Prefecture, Yunnan Province, China. Wanding is a town in the official division system, but there are three administrative systems in Wanding: county-level Wanding Economic Development Zone (畹町经济开发区), township-level Wanding Town government and Wanding Farm (畹町农场) government.

== History ==
Wanding was developed after the Burma Road was built, as the terminal end of the road in China. It quickly grew into a trade town between China and Burma after 1938. As a result of Japanese troops occupying Wanding in 1942 during World War II, it became economically depressed, until it was recovered by the Chinese Expeditionary Force on 19 January 1945. Wanding is also an important town on the Ledo Road, whose opening ceremony was held in Wanding on 28 January 1945. Soong Tse-ven, the premier of the Republic of China attended the ceremony. The town government was also established in early 1945.

Wanding upgraded to a county-level town in 1952 and established county-level Wanding City in 1985. The border trade at Wanding reached its peak in 1992, and then it declined. The reason is complicated, which includes the route change of China National Highway 320, the competition from the neighboring city Ruili, the national border trade policy adjustment, and the 1997 Asian financial crisis, etc. Thereafter, Wanding city was abolished in 1999, and a county-level Wanding Economic Development Zone of Ruili city was founded to replace the Wanding city. Wanding city was divided into three township-level divisions: Chengguan Town (城关镇), Hunban Township (混板乡), and Mangbang Township (芒棒乡). These three combined to a new town of Wanding in 2005, and it was the only township-level division under the economic development zone. In 2011, another township-level division, Wanding Farm, was transferred under the administration of the economic development zone from the Yunnan provincial farm system. Therefore, the economic development zone contains two township-level divisions now.

== Geography ==
Wanding, with an area of 103 km^{2} (40 sq mi) and population of 13,906, lies on the Wanding River. It is about 850 km from Kunming and the nearest airport is Mangshi in Luxi City. Wanding Town has three administrative villages and six village zoning units.

== Border crossing ==
The China–Myanmar border runs to the south of the town, the nearest Myanmar town being Pang Hseng (Kyu-hkök) to the south across the Wanding River. There is a border checkpoint between Wanding and Pang Hseng, which functioned as the crossing from what was then known as Burma into China on the historic Burma Road and Ledo Road, with supplies transported from India and Burma into China during World War II.

== Gallery ==
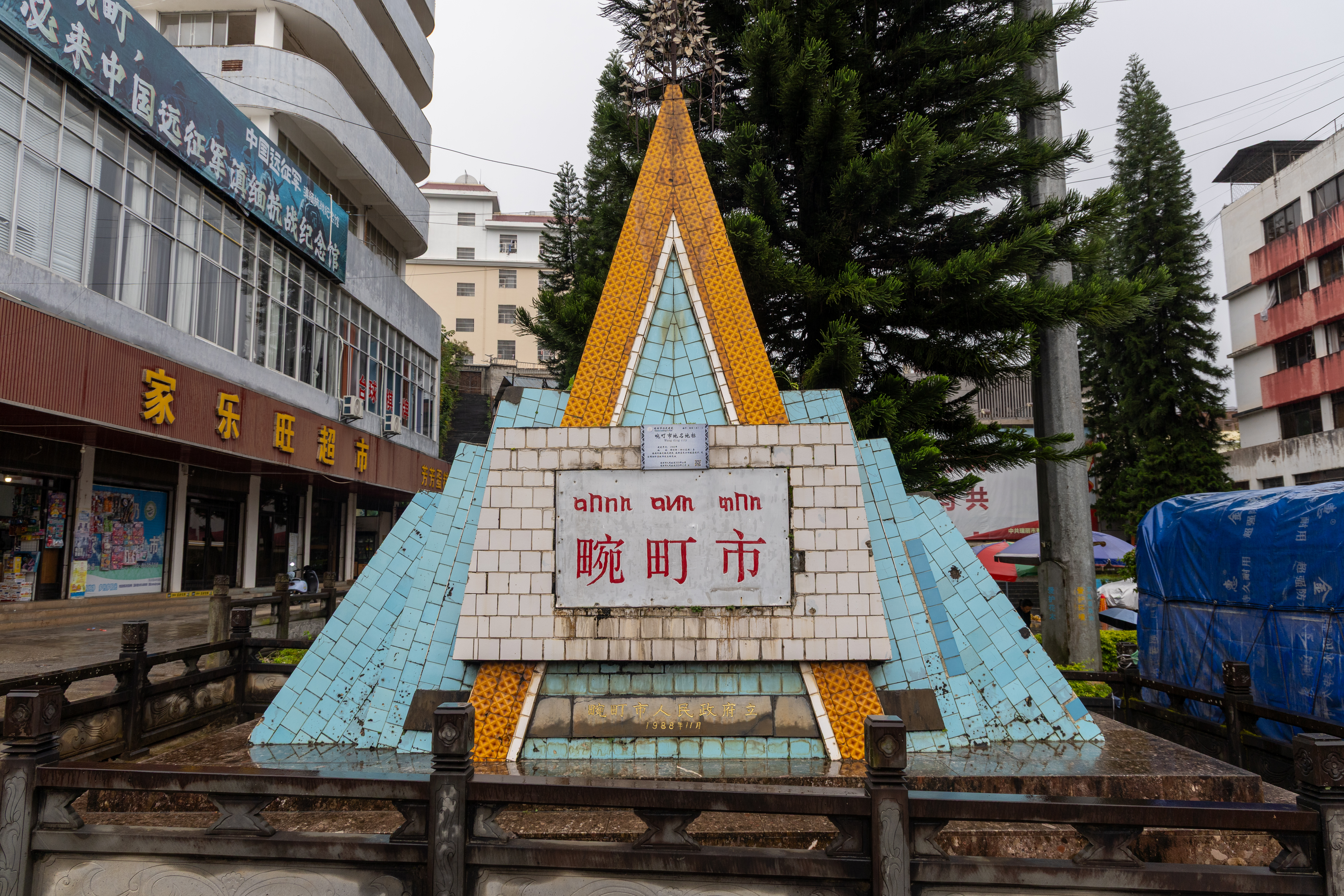
"Wanding City" landmark

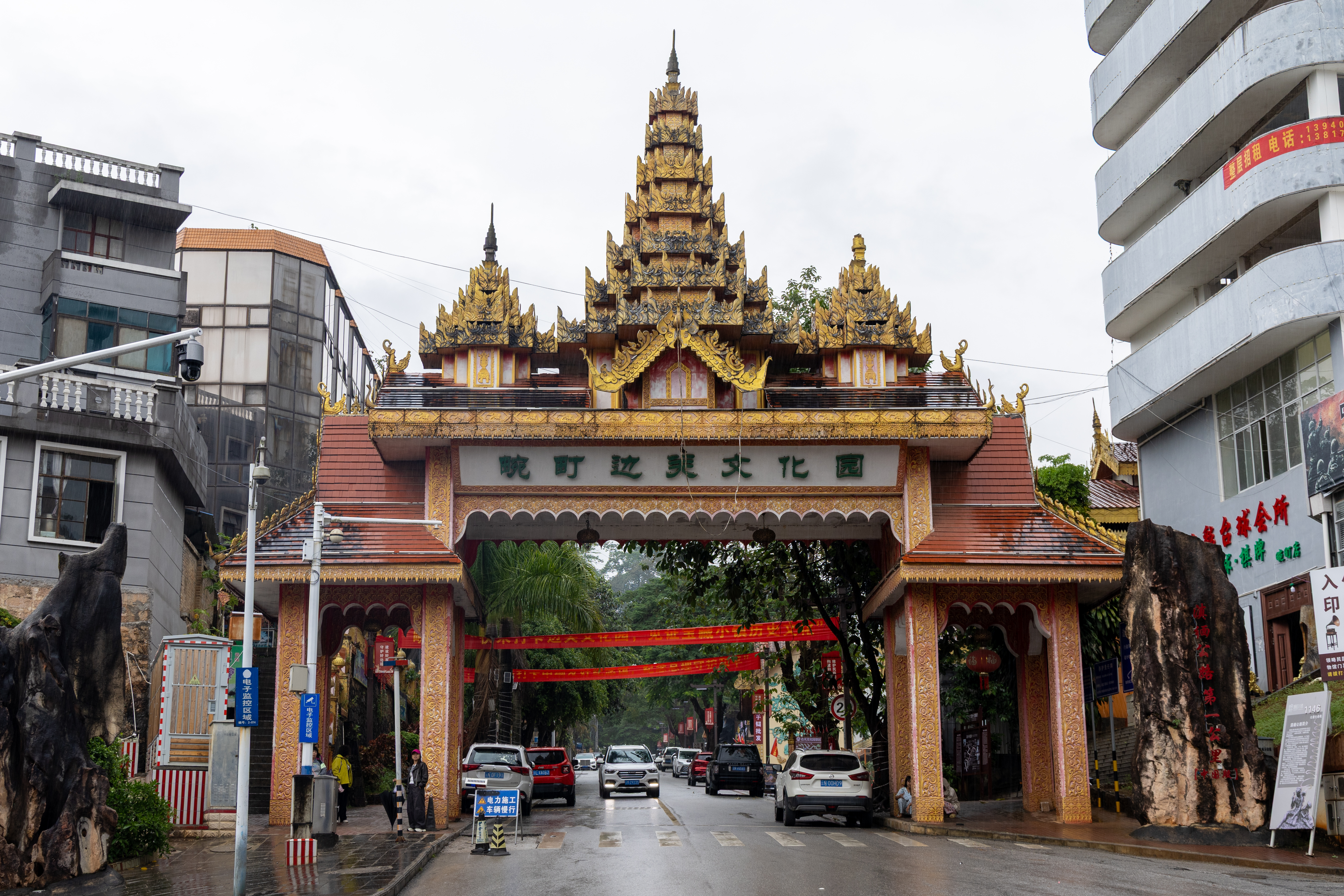
Archway to Guofang Street in Wanding.

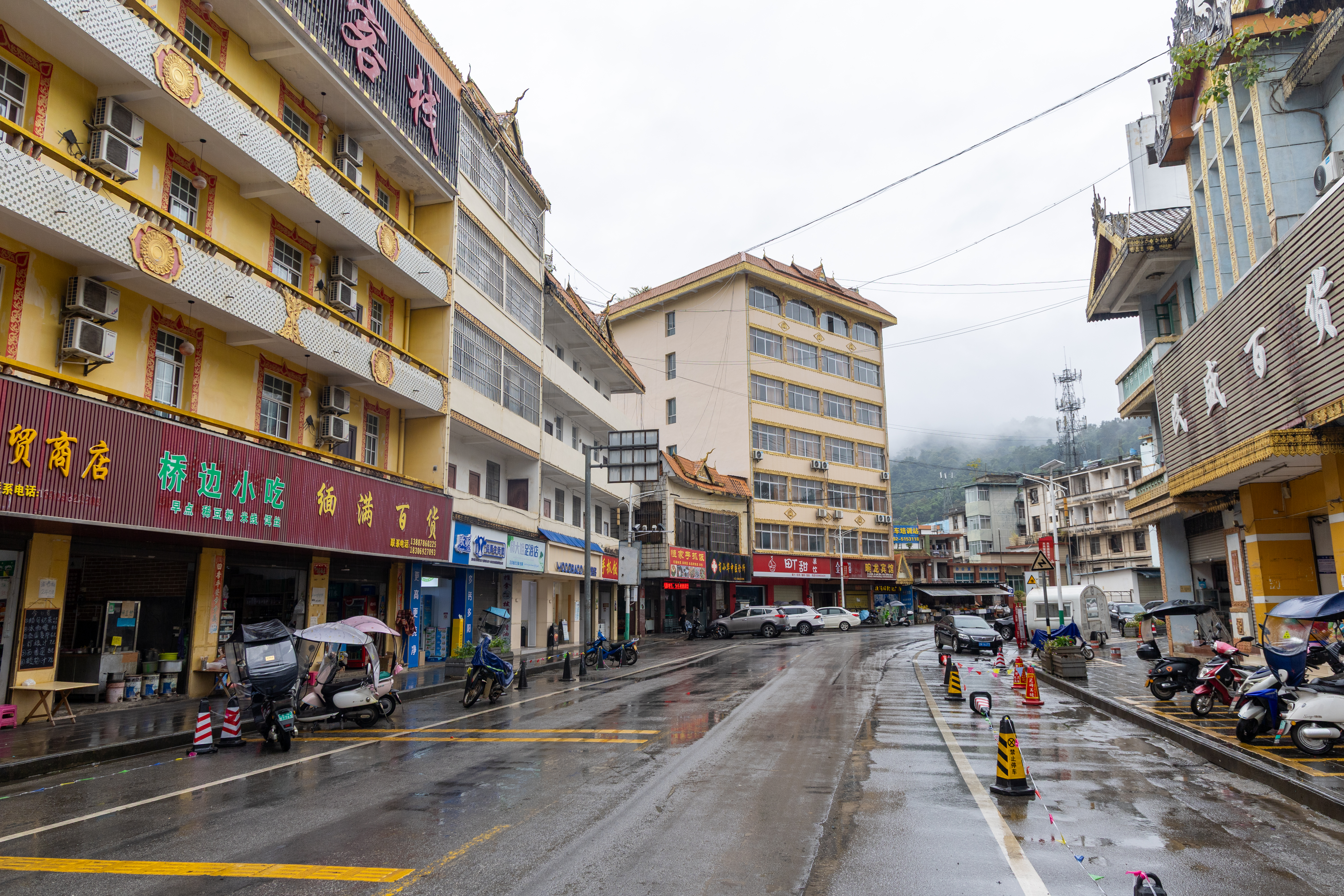
Street in Wanding.

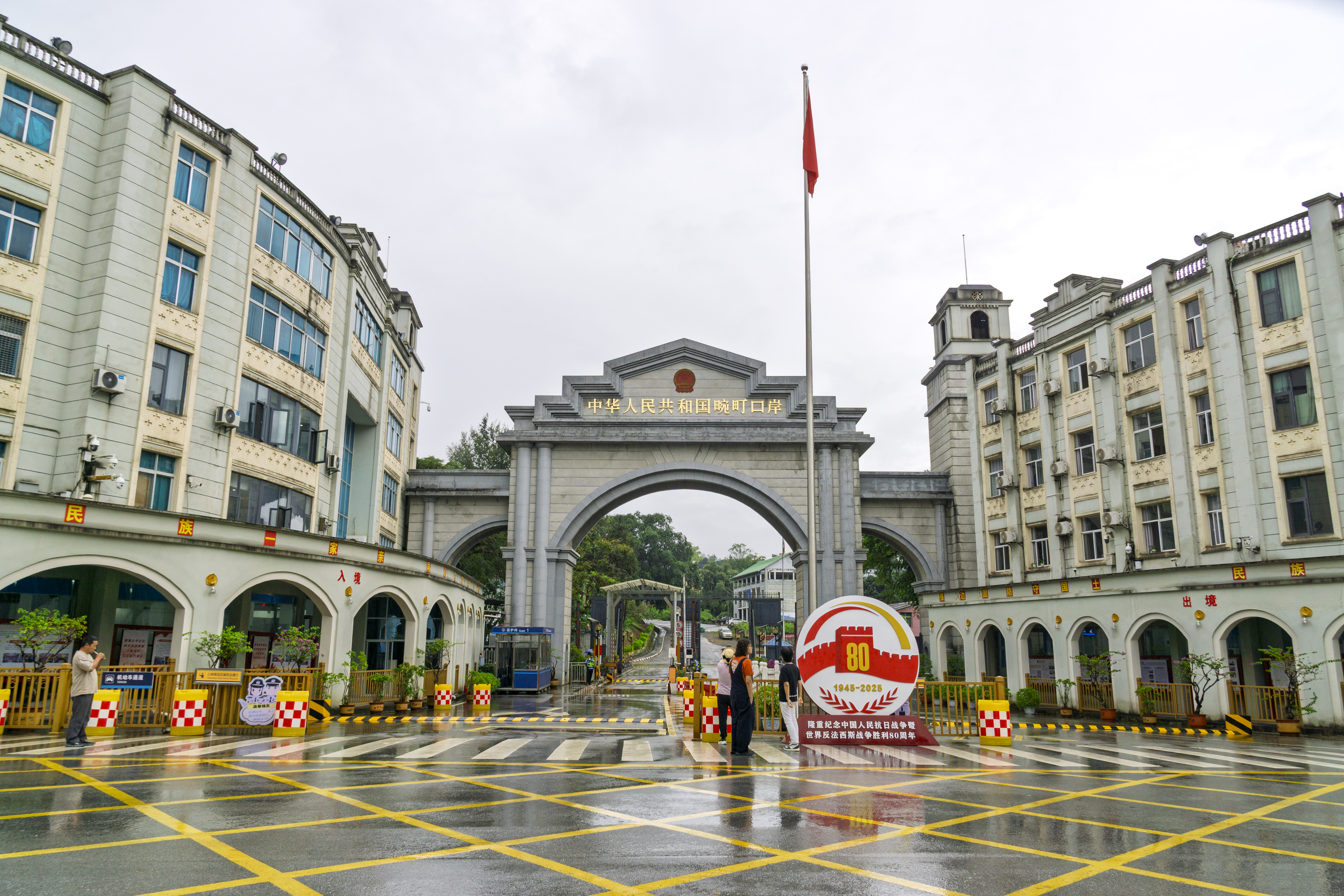
Border crossing into Pang Hseng, Myanmar, from Wanding, with the Chinese checkpoint in the building on the left.

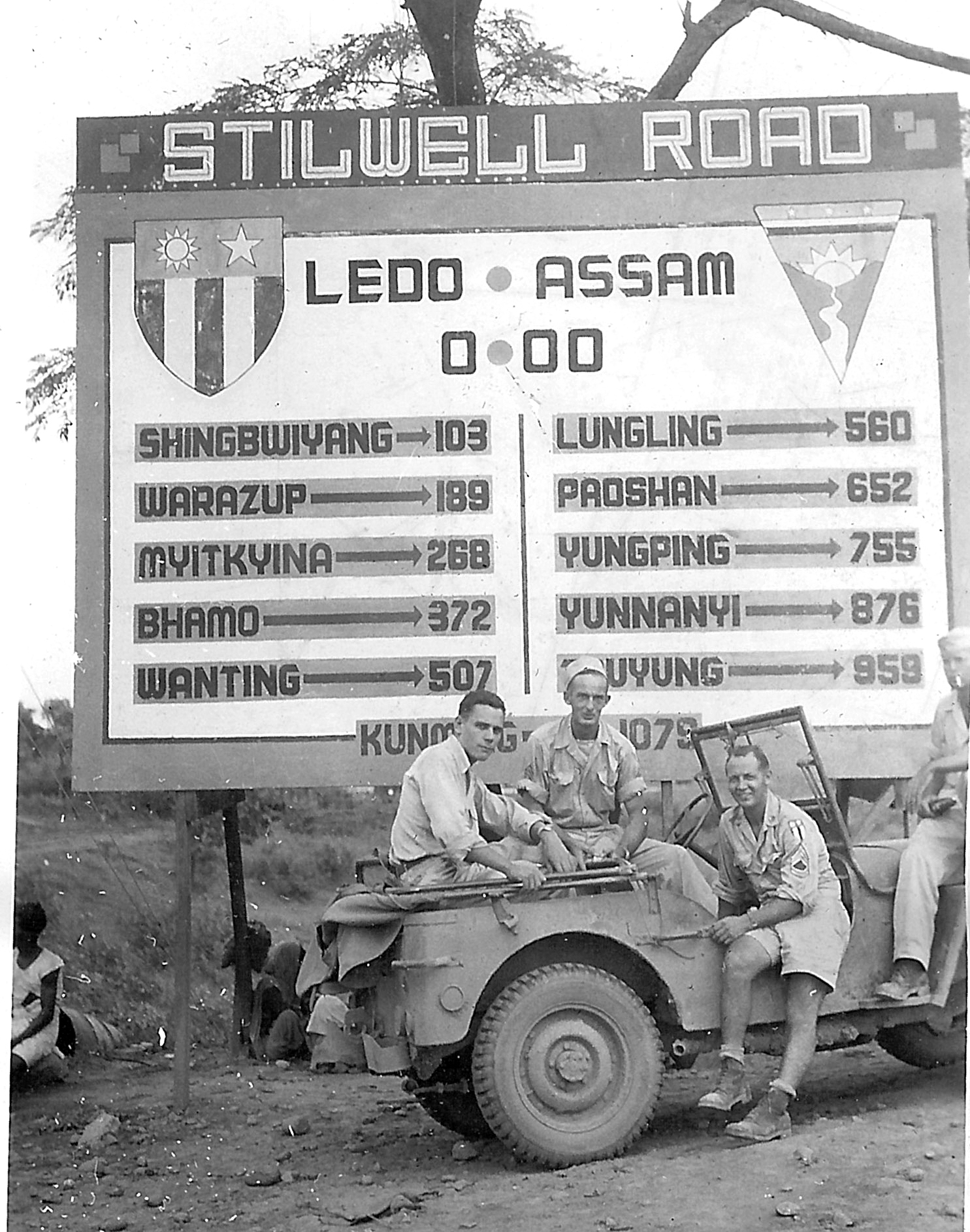
Signboard at Ledo, Assam, showing the distance to Wanding on the Ledo Road.

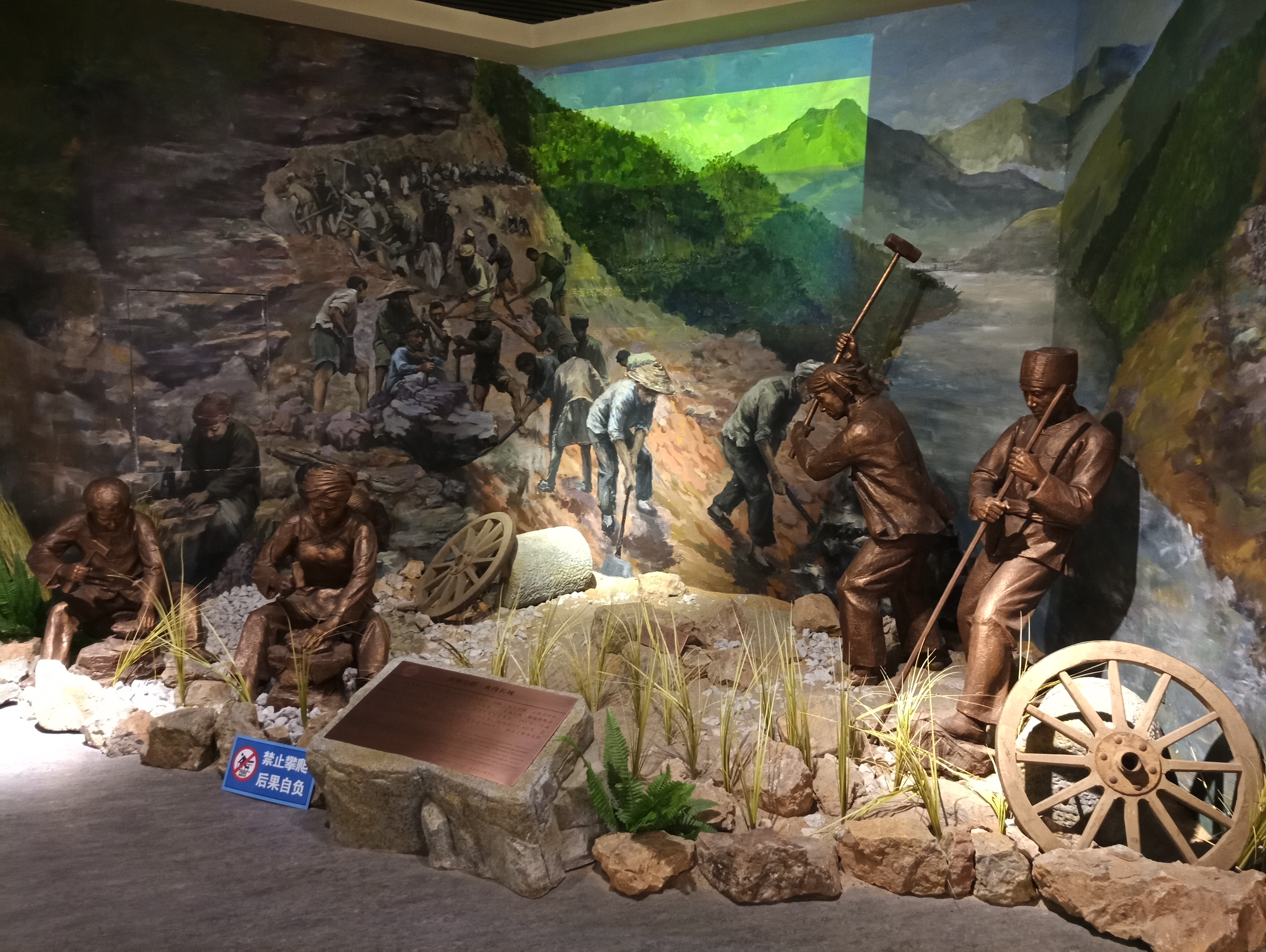
A diorama in the Memorial Park for Overseas Chinese Drivers and Mechanics from Southeast Asia in the Second Sino-Japanese War showing the construction of the Ledo Road.

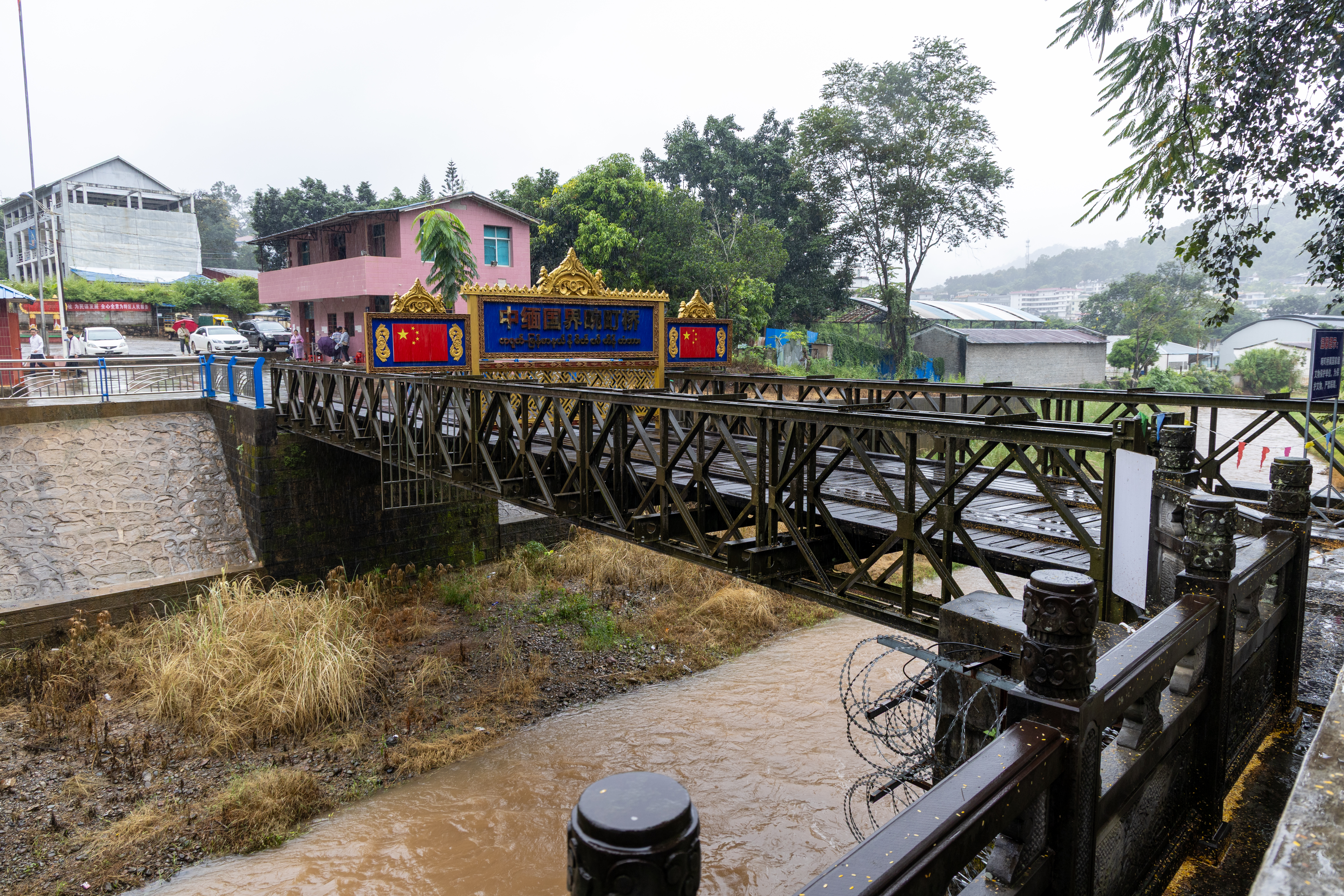
Old Wanding Bridge which was part of the Ledo Road, next to the new concrete bridge.

== See also ==
- Wanding Border Economic Cooperation Zone
