= The Stilwell Road (film) =

1945 film

- Produced by: Office of War Information
- Narrated by: Ronald Reagan
- Release date: 1945
- Running time: 50 minutes
- Country: United States
- Language: English

The full film

The Stilwell Road is a propaganda film produced by the American Office of War Information and the British and Indian film units in 1945 detailing the creation of the Ledo Road, also known as the Stilwell Road after the U.S. General Joseph Stilwell. The film is narrated by Ronald Reagan.

The film opens with a message telling the audience that the film is about more than the building of a road in the jungle; it is also the story of Scots, Irish, English, Americans, Africans, Indians, and Chinese working together to win the war, and that they are now ready to work together to win a peaceful post war world as well.

The hour-length film concentrates mostly on the importance of the Burma Campaign and the Burma Road in supplying Chinese nationalist army and American forces (the tactical Fourteenth Air Force and strategic XX Bomber Command of "Operation Matterhorn") in the Republic of China with supplies to resist Japanese domination, in much the same way Persian Corridor needed to be kept open to keep the USSR supplied by the Western Allies. But the forces there have to confront harsh terrain and monsoons, and are driven out in early 1942. Still, working in Assam and British India, the Allies work to keep supplies flowing to General Stilwell and Chiang Kai-shek by making the Ledo Road which replaced the severed Burma Road.

Also covered are Japan's abortive invasion of India in 1943 and the gradual retaking of Burma.

== See also ==
- List of Allied propaganda films of World War II
- The Hump
- China Burma India Theater of World War II
- South-East Asian Theater of World War II
