= Sut Ring Pan =

Burmese journalist (born 1999)

- ဆွတ်ရိန်ပန်
- Born: 1999 (age 26–27); Tanai, Kachin State, Myanmar
- Occupation: Journalist
- Years active: 2023–present
- Criminal charges: Sedition; Terrorism
- Criminal penalty: 13 years imprisonment
- Criminal status: In prison

Sut Ring Pan (Burmese: ဆွတ်ရိန်ပန်; born c. 1999), also known by her pen name Pu Noi Tsawms, is a Burmese freelance journalist. In 2025, she was sentenced to a total of 13 years in prison on charges of terrorism and sedition, which was criticised by human rights groups.

== Personal life ==
Sut Ring Pan is Kachin and was born and raised in Tanai, Kachin State. Prior to the 2021 coup d'état, she had been a beauty pageant contestant in local competitions, and had hoped to represent Myanmar internationally. Following the coup, her father, who had campaigned for Aung San Suu Kyi and the National League for Democracy in previous elections, was arrested, prompting Sut Ring Pan and her family to temporarily flee Tanai.

At the time of Sut Ring Pan's arrest in 2024, she lived in Mingala Taungnyunt Township, Yangon Region.

== Career ==
Sut Ring Pan trained as a journalist with The 74 Media, a media outlet covering northern Myanmar, while operating at a second-hand clothing stall in Tanai. After initially interviewing sources for other journalists, she subsequently underwent an internship in Laiza, following which she became employed as a junior reporter and worked for a time in Thailand. Sut Ring Pan later reported she had been bullied and made to squat as punishment for making spelling errors and prevented from leaving her accommodation after missing curfews.

After returning to Myanmar, Sut Ring Pan moved to Mingala Taungnyunt Township, where she worked as a citizen journalist. In 2024, she was featured in a report by the Thomson Reuters Foundation about the role of citizen journalists on covering the ongoing conflict in Myanmar following the military coup. She was working as a freelance journalist at the time of her arrest in 2024.

== Arrest and detention ==
On 29 September 2024, Sut Ring Pan was arrested by plainclothes soldiers at her home in Mingala Taungnyunt Township. Items were confiscated from her home, including electronic devices and food; her whereabouts were not initially known to her family. She was detained at the military-run Yay Kyi Ai interrogation centre for 22 days, before being transferred to Mingala Taungnyunt's police station and later Insein Prison near Yangon. It was alleged that Sut Ring Pan had been assaulted during interrogations, causing injuries to her chest, hips and thighs.

On 16 May 2025, a court at Insein Prison sentenced Sut Ring Pan to three years in prison for incitement and spreading false news under section 505(a) of the penal code after being accused of publishing material that was critical of the government. On 2 December 2025, the Western District Court in Yangon sentenced Sut Ring Pan was sentenced to a combined sentence of 13 years imprisonment on charges of incitement and terrorism. She received a 10 year sentence under the section 50(j) of the Counterterrorism for her reporting.

Sut Ring Pan intends to appeal her sentence.

== Response ==
Sut Ring Pan's initial sentence in May 2025 was not widely publicised; it was later confirmed that her family had kept details of her arrest and sentence secret with the hopes that the court would be more lenient in her subsequent trial.

The Committee to Protect Journalists called on Burmese authorities to "immediately and unconditionally" release Sut Ring Pan, accusing them of using "vague and overboard laws" to prosecute journalists.

The Independent Myanmar Journalists Association condemned the decision to imprison Sut Ring Pan, and urged the international community to take "effective and decisive action" against the Burmese military in its ongoing targeting of journalists.
