= Ledo Road =

Road between India and China built in World War II

Coordinates: 27.68839°N 95.93262°E

- Chinese: 中印公路
- Literal meaning: China–India Highway
Transcriptions
Standard Mandarin
- Hanyu Pinyin: Zhōng-Yìn gōnglù

Alternative Chinese name
- Chinese: 史迪威公路
- Literal meaning: Stilwell Highway
Transcriptions
Standard Mandarin
- Hanyu Pinyin: Shǐdíwēi gōnglù

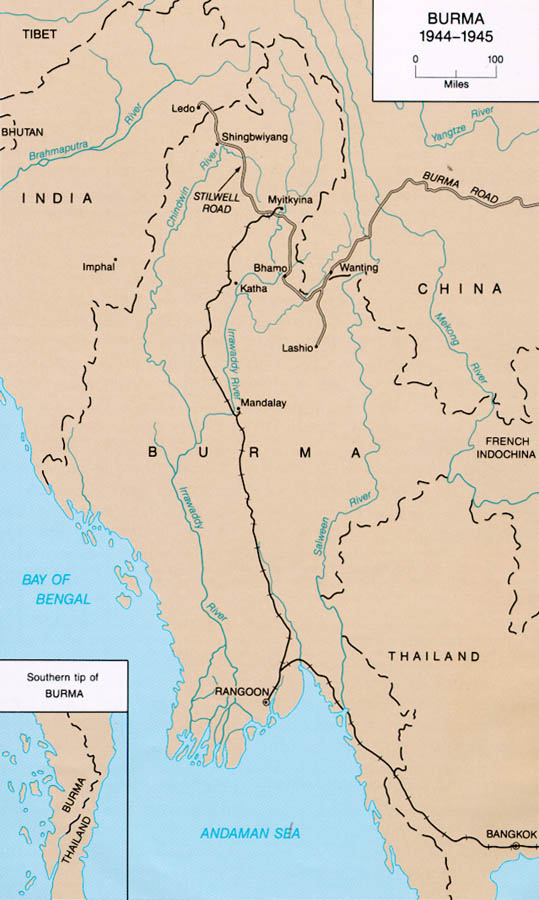
Burma Road and Ledo Road in 1944

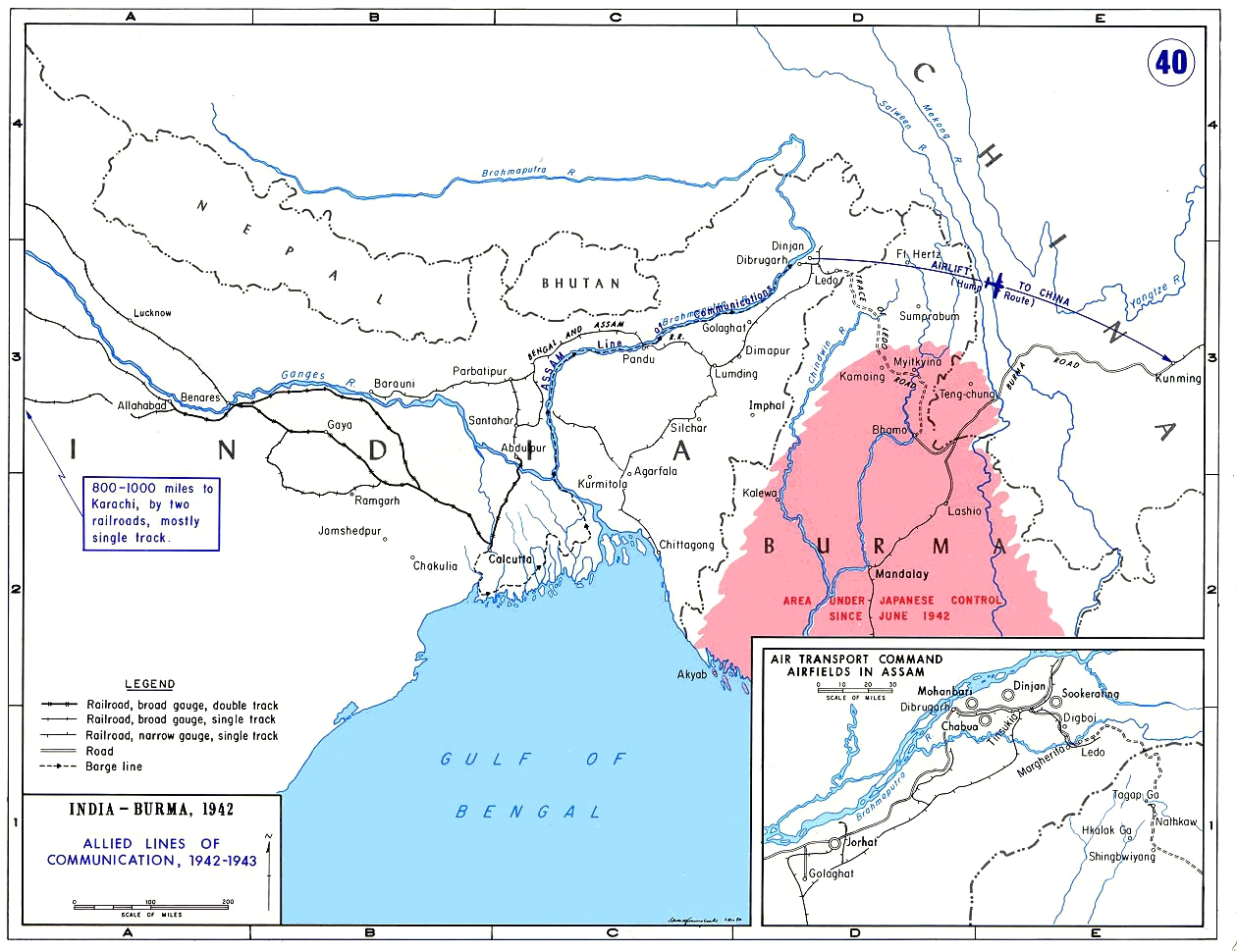
Allied lines of communication in Southeast Asia (1942–43). The Ledo Road is shown at far right.

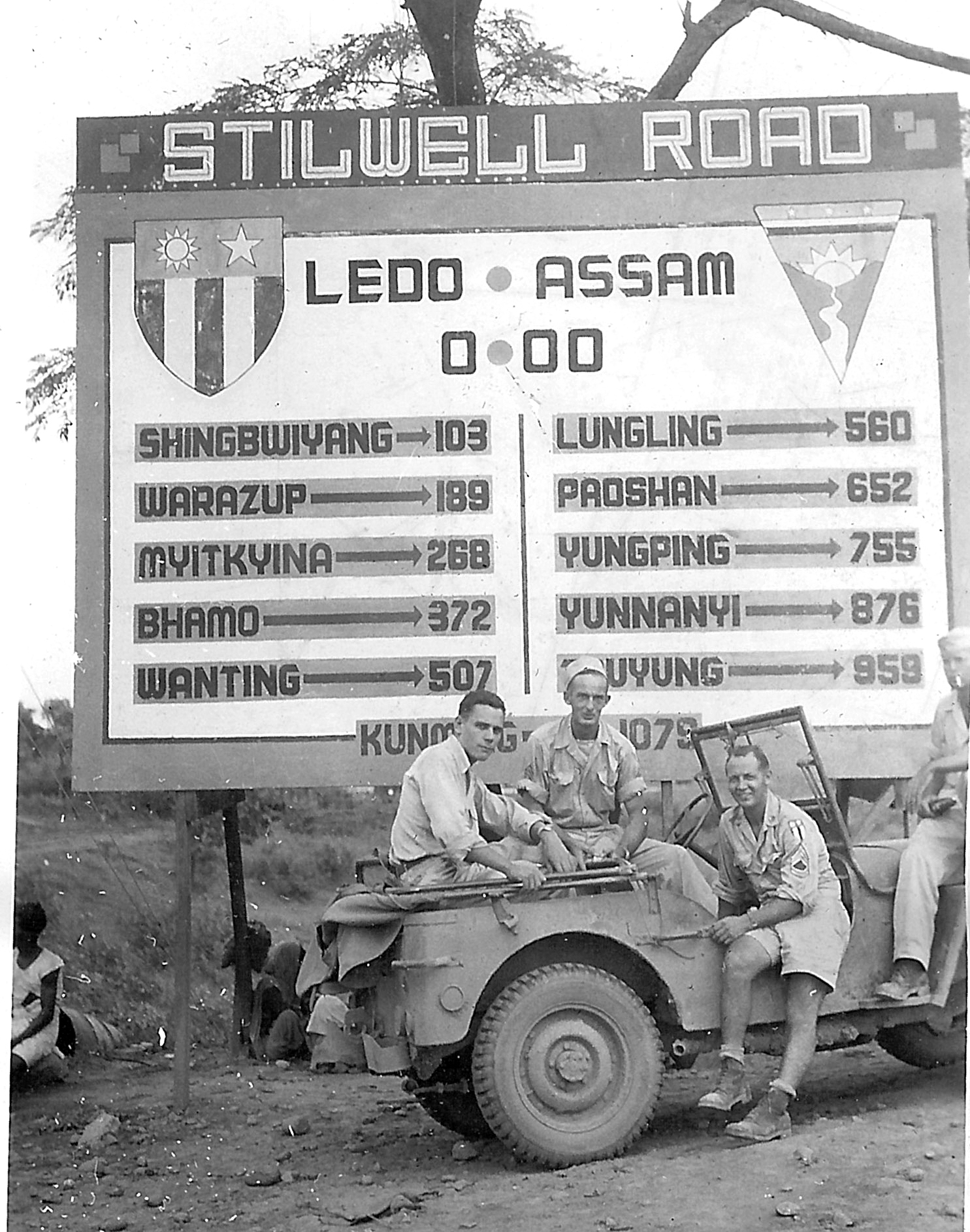
There was a sign at the start of the Ledo Road listing the distance in miles (pictured American GIs at the sign circa 1945): Ledo Assam 0: Shingbwiyang / 103; Warazup / 189; Myitkyina / 268; Bhamo / 372; Wanting / 507; Lungling / 560; Paoshan / 652; Yungping / 755; Yunnanyi / 876; Tsuyung / 959; Kunming 1079

Life-Line To China Re-Opened

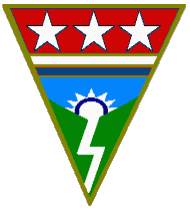
Ledo Road SSI

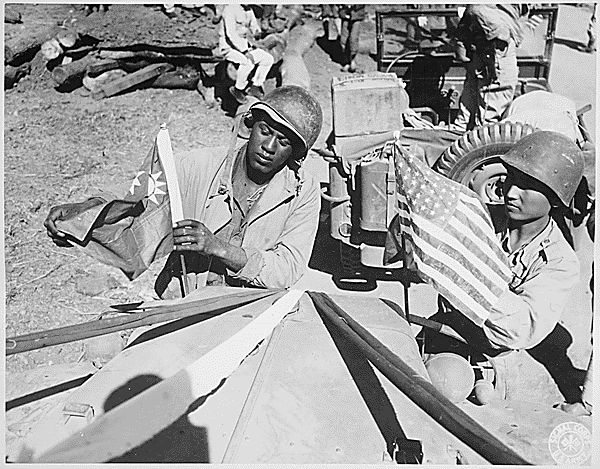
A U.S. Army soldier and a Chinese soldier place the flag of their ally on the front of their jeep just before the first truck convoy in almost three years crossed the China border en route from Ledo, India, to Kunming, China, over the Stilwell road in 1945

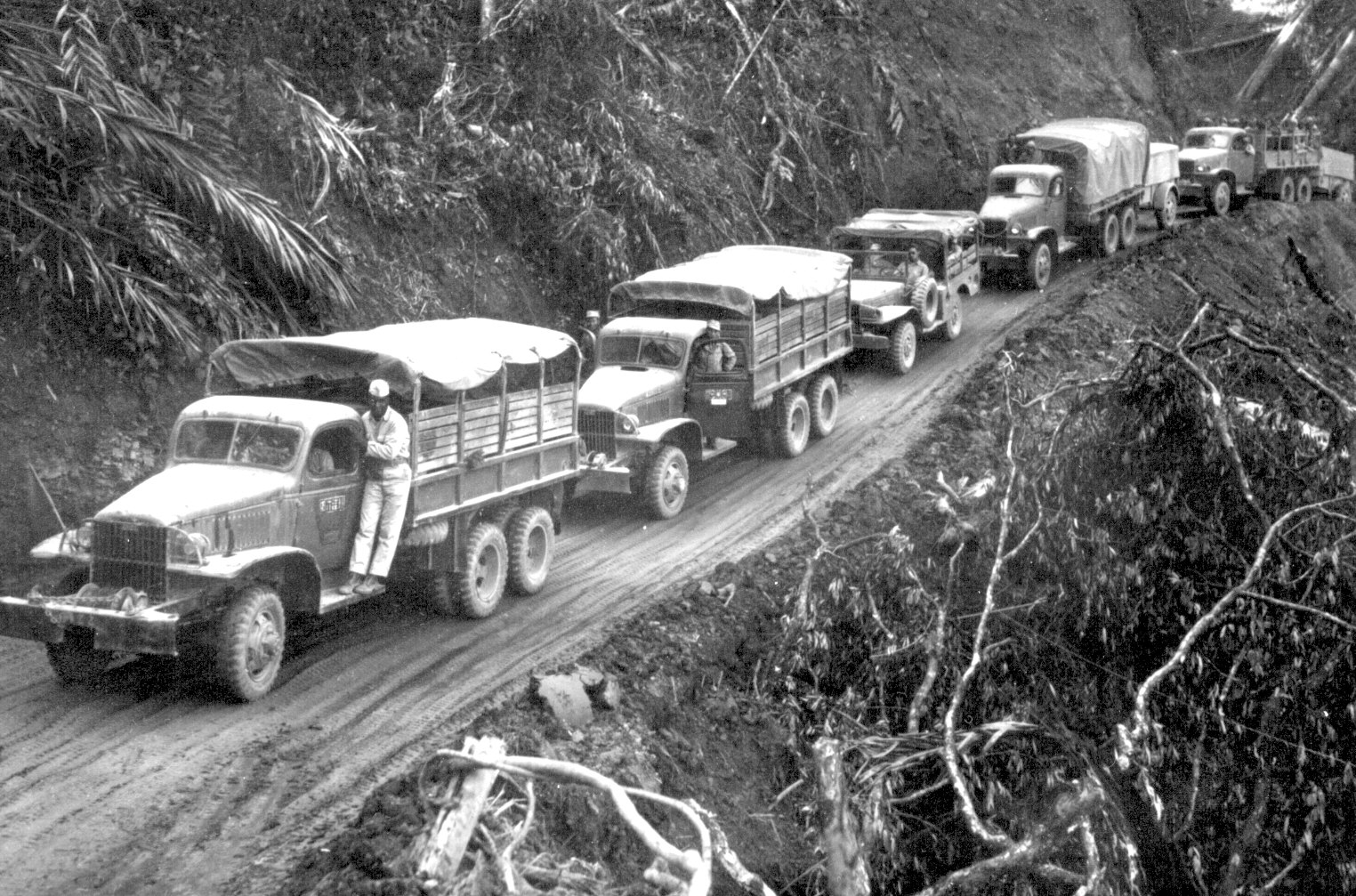
"U.S.-built Army trucks wind along the side of the mountain over the Ledo supply road now open from India into Burma..."

The Ledo Road (Burmese: လီဒိုလမ်းမ) was an overland connection between British India and China, built during World War II to enable the Western Allies to deliver supplies to China and aid the war effort against Japan. After the Japanese cut off the Burma Road in 1942 an alternative was required, hence the construction of the Ledo Road. It was renamed the Stilwell Road, after General Joseph Stilwell of the U.S. Army, in early 1945 at the suggestion of Chiang Kai-shek. It passes through the Burmese towns of Shingbwiyang, Myitkyina and Bhamo in Kachin state. Of the 1,726 kilometres (1,072 mi) long road, 1,033 kilometres (642 mi) are in Burma and 632 kilometres (393 mi) in China with the remaining 61 kilometres (38 mi) in India. The road had the Ledo-Pangsau Pass-Tanai (Danai)-Myitkyina--Bhamo-Mansi-Namhkam-Kunming route.

To transport supplies from the railheads to army fronts, three all-weather roads were constructed in record time during the autumn of 1943: the Ledo Road in the north, spanning three countries and connecting to the Burma Road to supply China; the Central Front road within India, from Dimapur to Imphal, which was critical to the campaign; and the southern road from Dohazari, south of Chittagong in British India, supporting the advance of troops to Arakan in Myanmar.

In the 19th century, British railway builders had surveyed the Pangsau Pass, which is 1,136 metres (3,727 feet) high on the India-Burma border, on the Patkai crest, above Nampong, Arunachal Pradesh and Ledo, Tinsukia (part of Assam). They concluded that a track could be pushed through to Burma and down the Hukawng Valley. Although the proposal was dropped, the British prospected the Patkai Range for a road from Assam into northern Burma. British engineers had surveyed the route for a road for the first 130 kilometres (80 miles). After the British had been pushed back out of most of Burma by the Japanese, building this road became a priority for the United States. After Rangoon was captured by the Japanese and before the Ledo Road was finished, the majority of supplies to the Chinese had to be delivered via airlift over the eastern end of the Himalayan Mountains known as the Hump.

After the war, the road fell into disuse. In 2010, the BBC reported "much of the road has been swallowed up by jungle."

== Construction ==
On 1 December 1942, British General Sir Archibald Wavell, the supreme commander of the Far Eastern Theatre, agreed with American General Stilwell to make the Ledo Road an American NCAC operation. The Ledo Road was intended to be the primary supply route to China and was built under the direction of General Stilwell from the railhead at Ledo, Assam, in India, to Mong-Yu road junction where it joined the Burma Road. From there trucks could continue on to Wanting on the Chinese frontier, so that supplies could be delivered to the reception point in Kunming, China. Stilwell's staff estimated that the Ledo Road route would supply 65,000 tons of supplies per month, greatly surpassing tonnage then being airlifted over the Hump to China. General Claire Lee Chennault, the USAAF Fourteenth Air Force commander, thought the projected tonnage levels were overly optimistic and doubted that such an extended network of trails through difficult jungle could ever match the amount of supplies that could be delivered with modern cargo transport aircraft.

The road was built by 15,000 American soldiers (60 percent of whom were African-Americans) and 35,000 local workers at an estimated cost of US$150 million (or $2 billion 2017). The costs also included the loss of over 1,100 Americans lives, as many died during the construction, as well as the loss of many locals' lives. The human cost of the 1,079 mile road was therefore described as "A Man A Mile". As most of Burma was in Japanese hands it was not possible to acquire information as to the topography, soils, and river behaviour before construction started. This information had to be acquired as the road was constructed.

General Stilwell had organized a 'Service of Supply' (SOS) under the command of Major General Raymond A. Wheeler, a high-profile US Army engineer and assigned him to look after the construction of the Ledo Road. Major General Wheeler, in turn, assigned responsibility of base commander for the road construction to Colonel John C. Arrowsmith. Later, he was replaced by Colonel Lewis A. Pick, an expert US Army engineer.

Work started on the first 166 km (103 mi) section of the road in December 1942. The road followed a steep, narrow trail from Ledo, across the Patkai Range through the Pangsau Pass (nicknamed "Hell Pass" for its difficulty), and down to Shingbwiyang, Burma. Sometimes rising as high as 1,400 m (4,600 ft), the road required the removal of earth at the rate of 1,800 cubic metres per kilometre (100,000 cubic feet per mile). Steep gradients, hairpin curves and sheer drops of 60 m (200 ft), all surrounded by a thick rain forest was the norm for this first section. The first bulldozer reached Shingbwiyang on 27 December 1943, three days ahead of schedule.

The building of this section allowed much-needed supplies to flow to the troops engaged in attacking the Japanese 18th Division, which was defending the northern area of Burma with their strongest forces around the towns of Kamaing, Mogaung, and Myitkyina. Before the Ledo road reached Shingbwiyang, Allied troops (the majority of whom were American-trained Chinese divisions of the X Force) had been totally dependent on supplies flown in over the Patkai Range. As the Japanese were forced to retreat south, the Ledo Road was extended. This was made considerably easier from Shingbwiyang by the presence of a fair weather road built by the Japanese, and the Ledo Road generally followed the Japanese trace. As the road was built, two 10 cm (4 in) fuel pipe lines were laid side-by-side so that fuel for the supply vehicles could be piped instead of trucked along the road.

After the initial section to Shingbwiyang, more sections followed: Warazup, Myitkyina, and Bhamo, 600 km (370 mi) from Ledo. At that point the road joined a spur of the old Burma road and, although improvements to further sections followed, the road was passable. The spur passed through Namkham 558 km (347 mi) from Ledo and finally at the Mong-Yu road junction, 748 km (465 mi) from Ledo, the Ledo Road met the Burma Road. To get to the Mong-Yu junction the Ledo Road had to span 10 major rivers and 155 secondary streams, averaging one bridge every 4.5 km (2.8 mi).

For the first convoys, if they turned right, they were on their way to Lashio 160 km (99 mi) to the south through Japanese-occupied Burma. If they turned left, Wanting lay 100 km (60 mi) to the north just over the China-Burma border. However, by late 1944, the road still did not reach China; by this time, tonnage airlifted over the Hump to China had significantly expanded with the arrival of more modern transport aircraft.

In late 1944, barely two years after Stilwell accepted responsibility for building the Ledo Road, it connected to the Burma Road though some sections of the road beyond Myitkyina at Hukawng Valley were under repair due to heavy monsoon rains. It became a highway stretching from Assam, India to Kunming, China 1,736 km (1,079 mi) length. On 12 January 1945, the first convoy of 113 vehicles, led by General Pick, departed from Ledo; they reached Kunming, China on 4 February 1945. In the six months following its opening, trucks carried 129,000 tons of supplies from India to China. Twenty-six thousand trucks that carried the cargo (one way) were handed over to the Chinese.

As General Chennault had predicted, supplies carried over the Ledo Road at no time approached tonnage levels of supplies airlifted monthly into China over the Hump. However, the road complemented the airlifts. The capture of the Myitkyina airstrip enabled the Air Transport Command "to fly a more southerly route without fear of Japanese fighters, thus shortening and flattening the Hump trip with astonishing results." In July 1943 the air tonnage was 5,500 rising to 8,000 in September and 13,000 in November. After the capture of Myitkyina deliveries jumped from 18,000 tons in June 1944 to 39,000 in November 1944.

In July 1945, the last full month before the end of the war, 71,000 tons of supplies were flown over the Hump, compared to only 6,000 tons using the Ledo Road; the airlift operation continued in operation until the end of the war, with a total tonnage of 650,000 tons compared to 147,000 for the Ledo Road. By the time supplies were flowing over the Ledo Road in large quantities, operations in other theaters had shaped the course of the war against Japan.

When flying over the Hukawng Valley during the monsoon, Mountbatten asked his staff the name of the river below them. An American officer replied, "That's not a river, it's the Ledo Road."

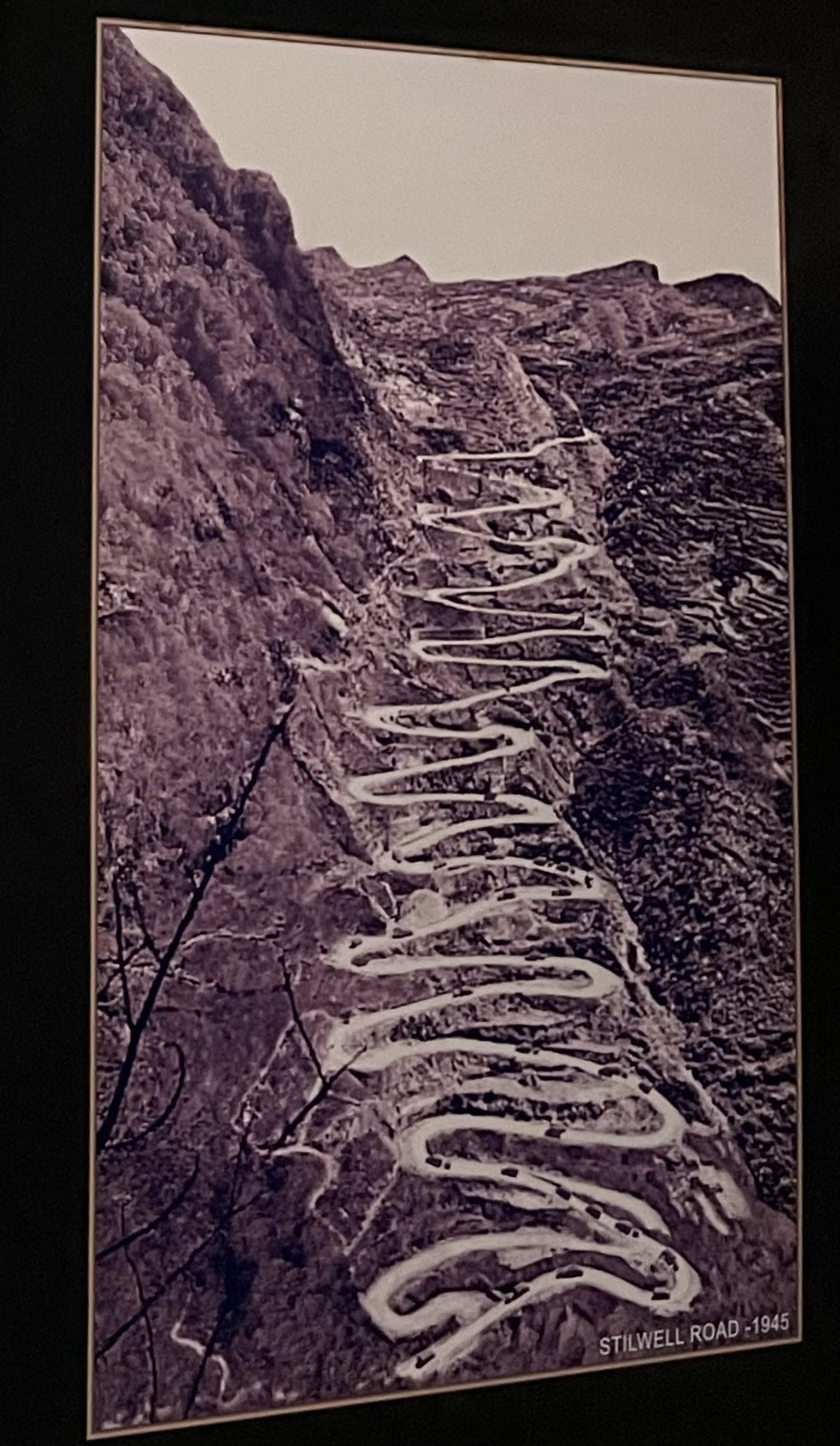
Image of Stilwell Road displayed in Coal Heritage Park & Museum, Margherita, Assam.

== American Army units assigned to the Ledo Road ==
The units initially assigned to the initial section were:

- 45th Engineer General Service Regiment (An African-American Unit)
- 823rd Aviation Engineer Battalion (EAB) (An African-American Unit)

In 1943 they were joined by:

- 848th EAB (An African-American Unit)
- 849th EAB (An African-American Unit)
- 858th EAB (An African-American Unit)
- 1883rd EAB (An African-American Unit)
- 236th Combat Engineer Battalion
- 1875th Combat Engineer Battalion

From the middle of April until the middle of May 1944 Company A of the 879th Airborne Engineer Battalion worked 24 hours a day on the Ledo Road, construction of their base camp and Shingbwiyang airfield, before deploying to Myitkyina to improve the facilities of an old British airfield recently recaptured from the Japanese.

Work continued through 1944 in late December it was opened for the transport of logistics. In January 1945, four of the black EABs (along with three white battalions) continued working on the now renamed Stilwell Road, improving and widening it. Indeed, one of these African American units was assigned the task of improving the road that extended into China.

== Comments on the construction of the road ==
Winston Churchill called the project "an immense, laborious task, unlikely to be finished until the need for it has passed".

The British Field Marshal William Slim who commanded the British Fourteenth Army in India/Burma wrote of the Ledo Road:

I agreed with Stilwell that the road could be built. I believed that, properly equipped and efficiently led, Chinese troops could defeat Japanese if, as would be the case with his Ledo force, they had a considerable numerical superiority. On the engineering side I had no doubts. We had built roads over country as difficult, with much less technical equipment than the Americans would have. My British engineers, who had surveyed the trace for the road for the first eighty miles [130 km], were quite confident about that. We were already, on the Central front, maintaining great labour forces over equally gimcrack lines of communication. Thus far Stilwell and I were in complete agreement, but I did not hold two articles of his faith. I doubted the overwhelming war-winning value of this road, and, in any case, I believed it was starting from the wrong place. The American amphibious strategy in the Pacific, of hopping from island to island would, I was sure, bring much quicker results than an overland advance across Asia with a Chinese army yet to be formed. In any case, if the road was to be really effective, its feeder railway should start from Rangoon, not Calcutta.

== Post-World War II ==
After Burma was liberated, the road gradually fell into disrepair. In 1955 the Oxford-Cambridge Overland Expedition drove from London to Singapore and back. They followed the road from Ledo to Myitkyina and beyond (but not to China). The book First Overland written about this expedition by Tim Slessor (1957) reported that bridges were down in the section between Pangsau Pass and Shingbwiyang. In February 1958 the Expedition of Eric Edis and his team also used the road from Ledo to Myitkyina en route to Rangoon, Singapore and Australia. Ten months later they returned in the opposite direction. In his book about this expedition The Impossible Takes a Little Longer, Edis (2008) reports that they have removed a yellow sign with India/Burma on it from the Indian/Burmese border and that they have donated it to the Imperial War Museum in London. For many years, travel into the region was also restricted by the Government of India. Because of continuous clashes between insurgents (who were seeking shelter in Burma) and the Indian Armed Forces, India imposed harsh restrictions between 1962 and the mid-1990s on travel into Burma.

Since an improvement in relations between India and Myanmar, travel has improved and tourism has begun near Pangsayu Pass (at the Lake of No Return). Recent attempts to travel the full road have met with varying results. At present the Nampong-Pangsau Pass section is passable in four-wheel drive vehicles. The road on the Burmese side is now reportedly fit for vehicular traffic. Donovan Webster reached Shingbwiyang on wheels in 2001, and in mid-2005 veterans of the Burma Star Association were invited to join a "down memory lane" trip to Shingbwiyang organised by a politically well-connected travel agent. These groups successfully travelled the road but none made any comment on the political or human rights situation on Burma afterward.

Burmese from Pangsau village saunter nonchalantly across Pangsau Pass down to Nampong in India for marketing, for the border is open despite the presence of insurgents on both sides. There are Assam Rifles and Burma Army posts at Nampong and Pangsau respectively. But the rules for locals in these border areas do not necessarily apply to westerners. The governments of both countries keep careful watch on the presence of westerners in the border areas and the land border is officially closed. Those who cross without permission risk arrest or problems with smugglers/insurgents in the area.

== Current status ==
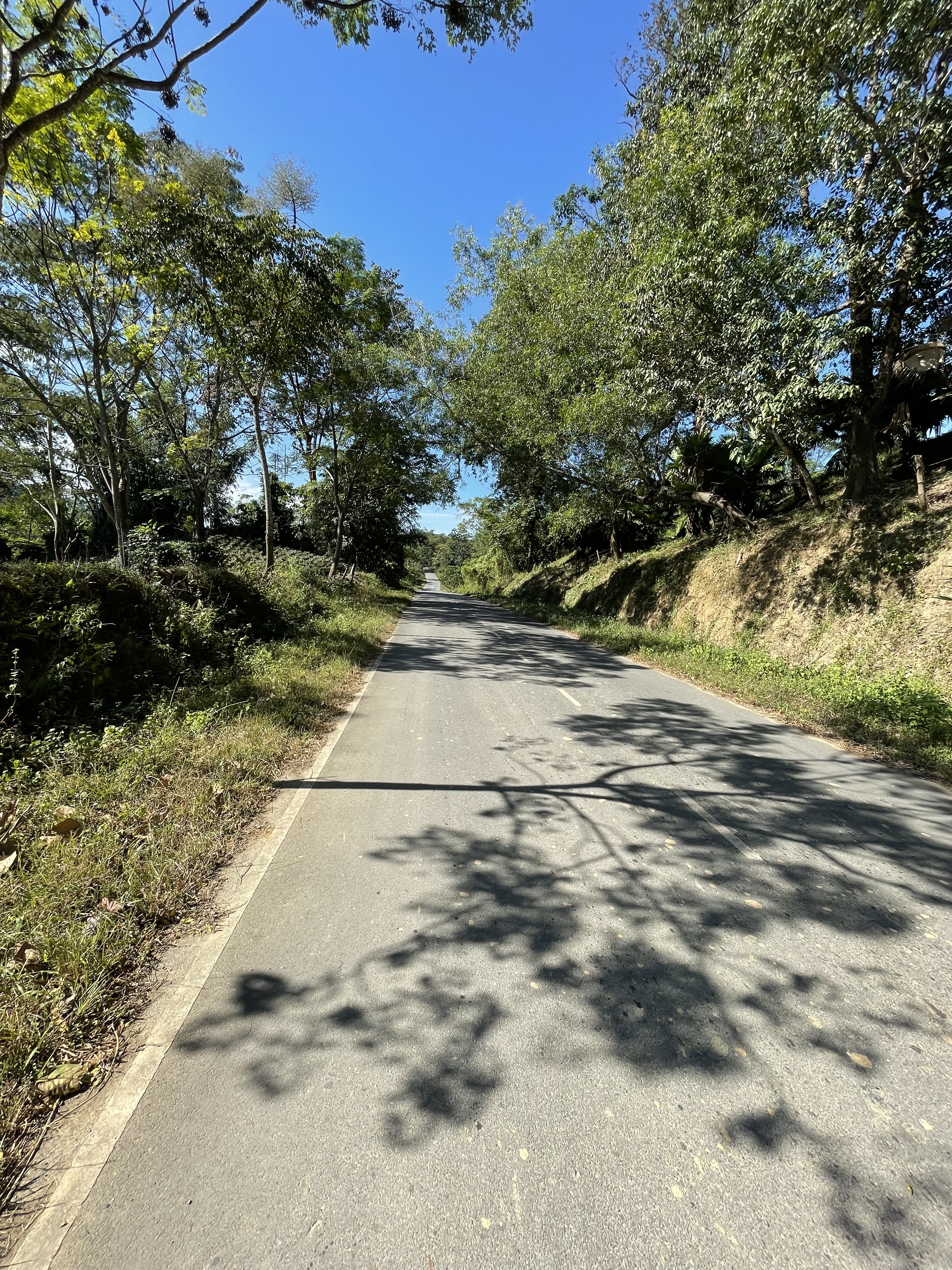
A paved stretch on the way to Nampong from Jairampur, India.

Currently Stillwell Road runs for 1,840 kilometres (1,140 mi) connecting Dibrugarh in Assam, India with Kunming in Yunnan, China running through Myanmar. As of 2022, the road from Ledo to Nampong in India was a paved road, with the road going further to Pangsau Pass on India-Myanmar having restricted civilian access. From Pangsau to Tanai was a mud track, from Tanai to Myitkyina was a wide compacted-earth road maintained by a commercial plantation company, the road section from Myitkyina to China border was reconstructed by a Chinese company, from China border to Kunming is a six-lane highway.

Since the beginning of the 21st century, the Burmese government focused on the reconstruction of the Ledo Road as an alternative to the existing Lashio-Kunming Burma Road. The Chinese government completed construction of the Myitkyina-Kambaiti section in 2007. Rangoon-based Yuzana Company constructed the section between Myitkyina and Tanai (Danai) which was already operational in 2011 as the company owns thousands of acres of land there for its multiple crop plantation including sugarcane and cassava. India's government, however, fears that the road may be useful to militants in North East India who have hideouts in Myanmar.

In 2010 the BBC described the road as such: "Much of the road has been swallowed up by jungle. It is barely passable on foot and is considered too dangerous to use by many because of the presence of Burmese and Indian ethnic insurgents in the area....At present the road from Myitkyina to the Chinese border – along with the brief Indian section – is usable."

In 2014, to document the status of the road, photographer Findlay Kember, working on a photo feature for the South China Morning Post, traveled the entire length of the road across three nations on three different trips due to not being allowed to cross the international borders. In India, there is Stilwell park in Lekhapani near Ledo to mark the beginning of the Stilwell road, a World War 2-era cemetery between Jairampur and Pangsau Pass for the Chinese soldiers and labourers who built the road, a still existing bridge near Nampong nicknamed "Hell's Gate" due to treacherous conditions and landslides in the area. In Myanmar, he found villagers using a World War II gas tank as a water tank in Kachin state, and the gravel road between Myitkyina and Tanai was very wide and well used but unpaved. In China, he found World War II trenches in Songshan in Yunnan province which was a site of fierce battles between Japanese defenders and Chinese attackers in June 1944, and a brass relief honoring Chinese and American soldiers in Tengchong in Yunnan. A post went viral in Philippines in 2019 which showed the current picture of 24-zigzag hairpin turns of Stilwell road on a mountain slope in Qinglong County in Guizhou province of China. It turned out to be a photo taken by Findlay Kember on his earlier trip. In 2015, it was not possible to cross the border on the Ledo Road due to visa restrictions. In 2015, the section from Namyun to Pangsau Pass in Burma was a "heavily rutted muddy track" through the jungle according to a BBC correspondent.

In 2016, Indian Government restored and expanded the Stillwell Road uptill Dibrugarh running through Margherita, Digboi, Tinsukia. Currently the 175 kilometres (109 mi) stretch of Stillwell Road is in India & it is the part of Asian Highway 2 or AH2. In India Stilwell Road is known as NH315 from Makum to Pangsu Pass. The stretch between Dibrugarh to Makum falls under NH15. In 2016-17, China called for restoration of Stilwell Road.

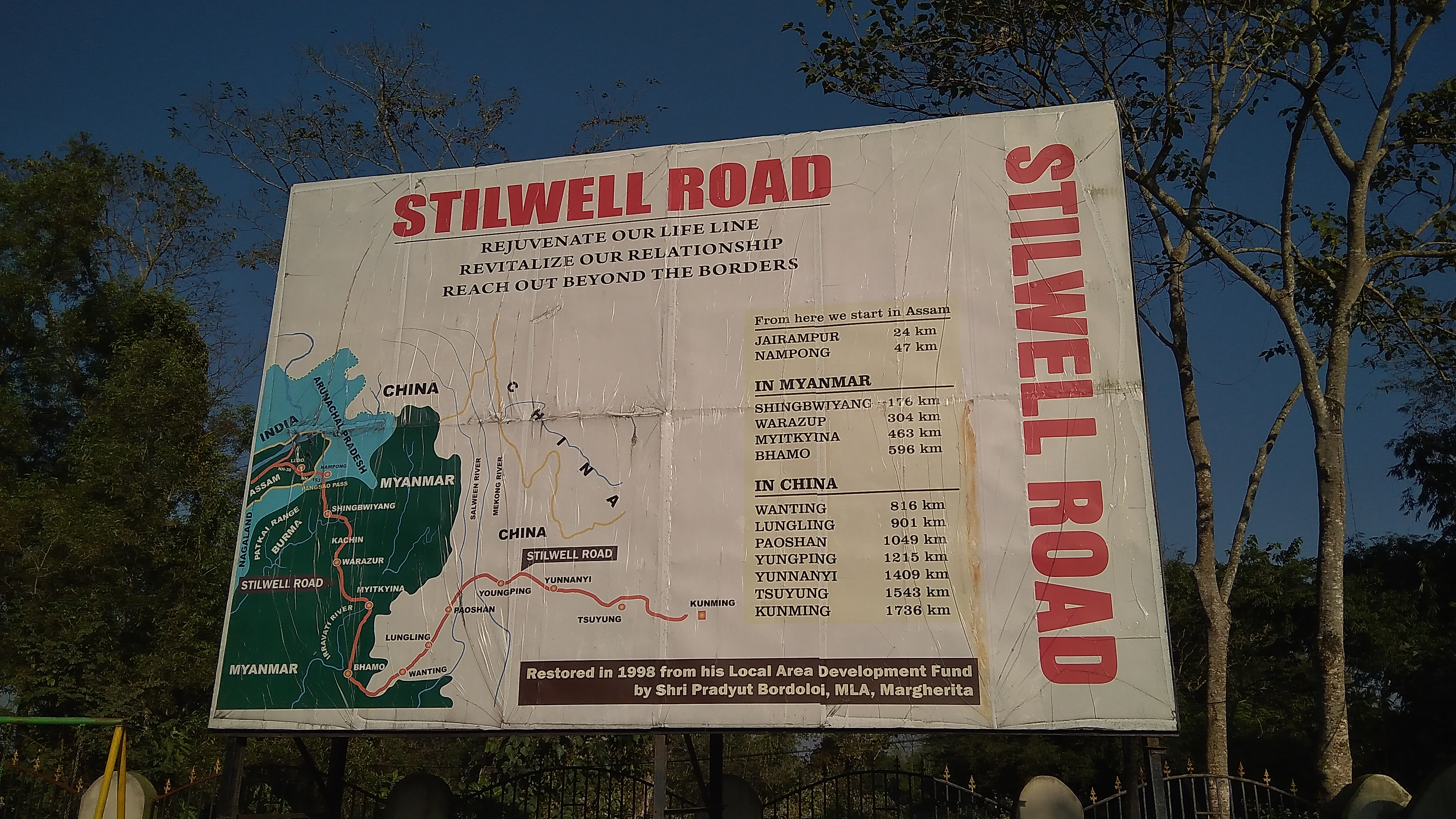
A display board at Stilwell Park in Lekhapani near Ledo marks the starting point of the Ledo Road.

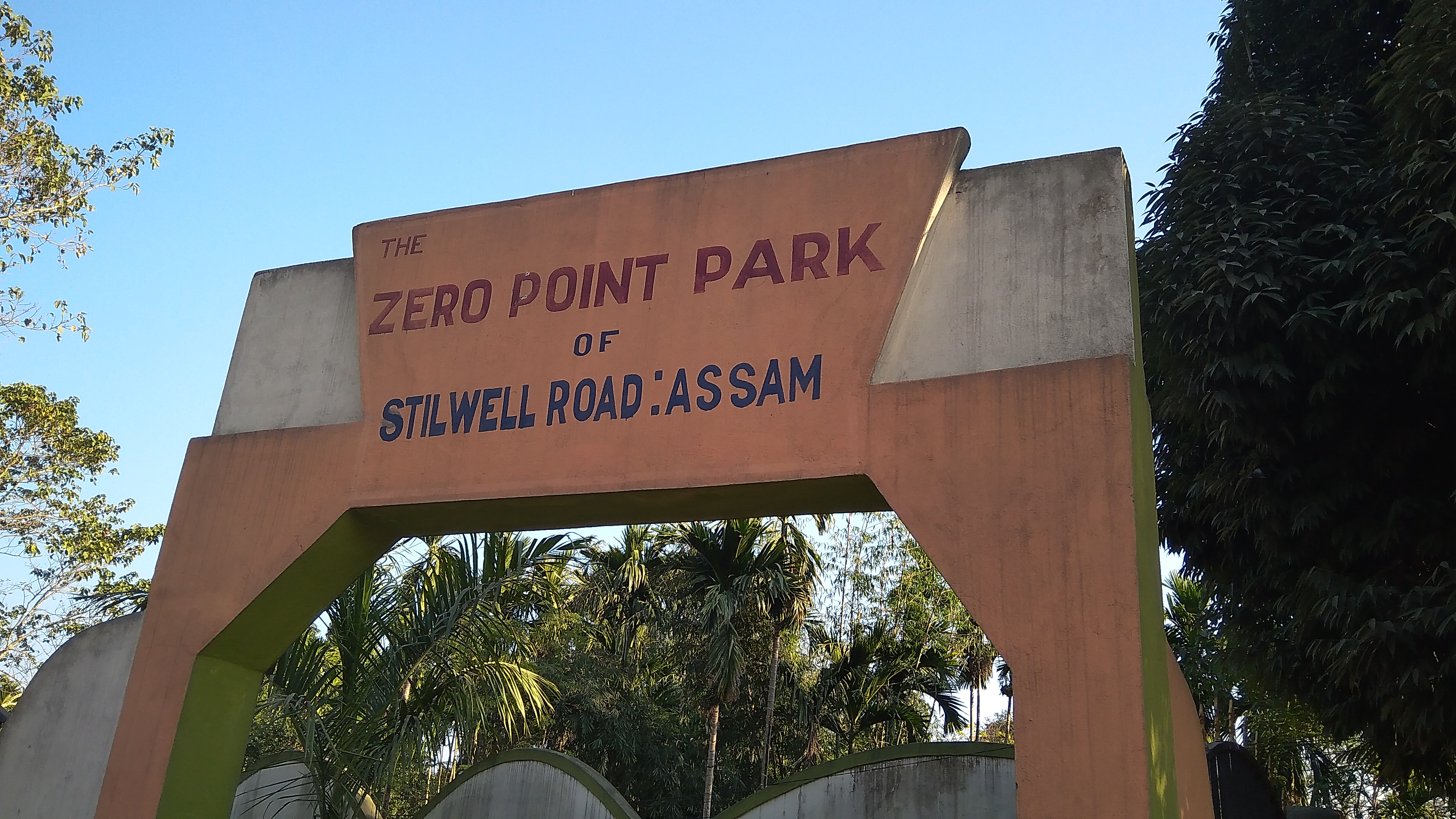
Zero Point at Ledo Road

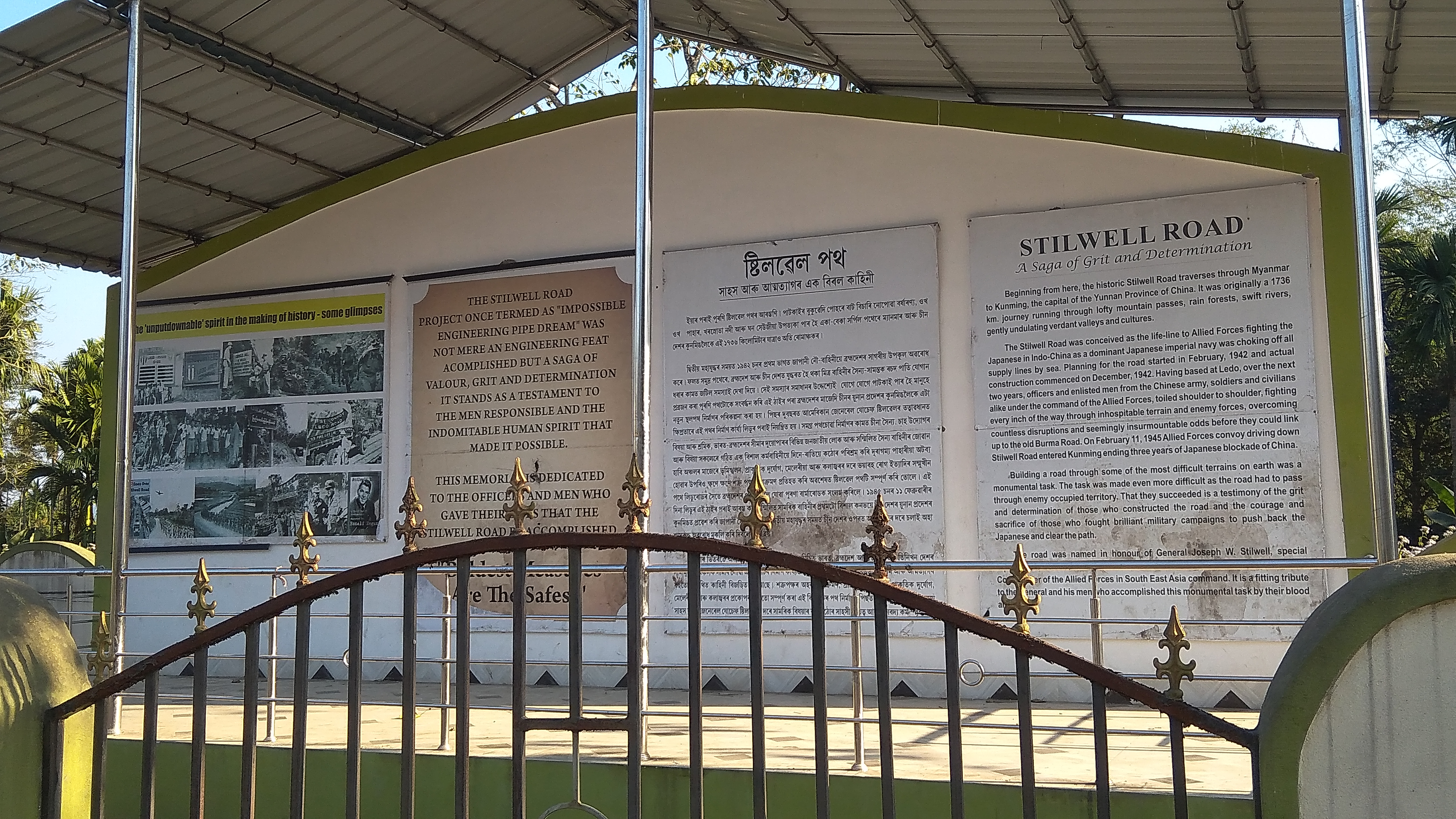
Memorial at Ledo

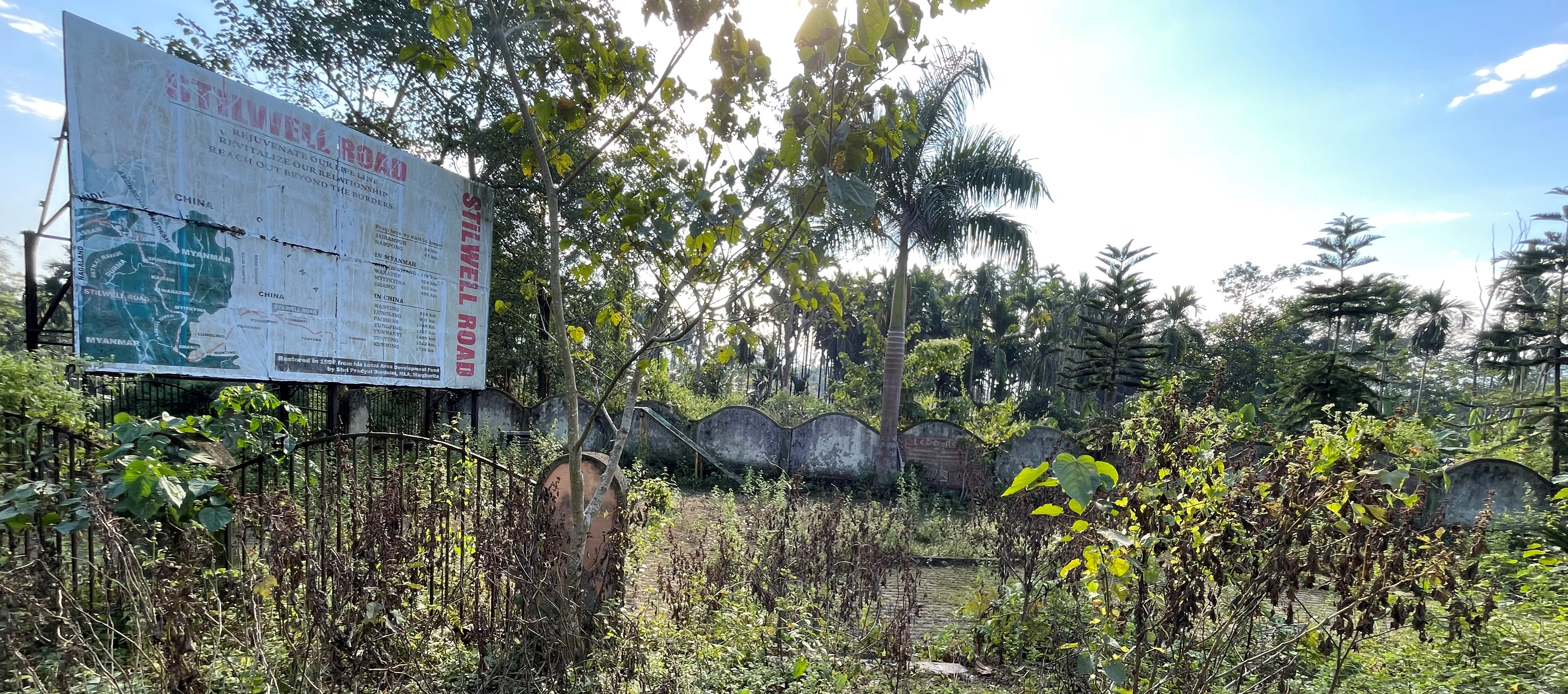
Stillwell Park in a state of disrepair, November 2022.

== See also ==
- Northeast Indian Railways during World War II. The Allies had problems supplying the depots at Ledo with all the logistical support needed by the Northern Front and the Chinese National Army.
- South-East Asian Theatre of World War II
- Pangsau Pass
- South East Asia Command
- The Stilwell Road featuring Ronald Reagan
- Burma campaign
- The Hump, name given by Allied pilots over which they flew from India to China
