= Tanai District =

Coordinates: 26.3500°N 96.7167°E

Tanai Township Tanai District တနိုင်းမြို့နယ် တနိုင်းခရိုင်
- Township and District
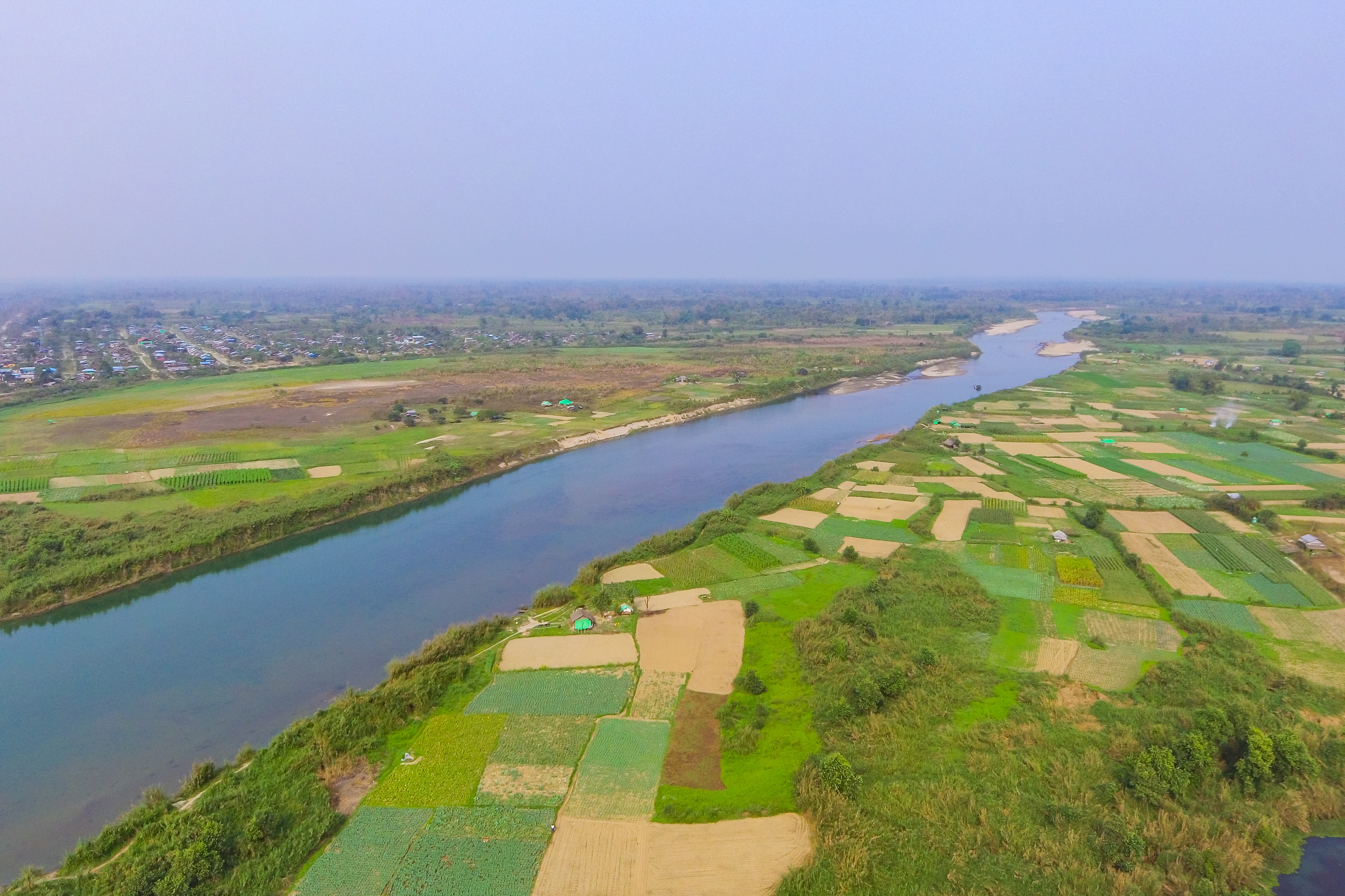
- Hukawng River in Tanai Township

- Location in Kachin State
- Country: Myanmar
- State: Kachin State
- District: Tanai District
- Capital: Tanai

Area
  - Total: 4,772.92 sq mi (12,361.8 km^{2})
- Elevation: 608 ft (185 m)

Population (2019)
  - Total: 39,229
  - Density: 8.2191/sq mi (3.1734/km^{2})
- Time zone: UTC+6:30 (MMT)

Tanai Township (Burmese: တနိုင်းမြို့နယ်) is the only township in Tanai District (Burmese: တနိုင်းခရိုင် in northwestern Kachin State, northern Myanmar. The principal town is Tanai. On 30 April 2022, the Ministry of Home Affairs designated Tanai Township into a new district consisting of only itself.

The Shadu Zup militia operates gold mines in the township. In July 2022, they attacked a Kachin Independence Army base near the Ka Nwe Thu mine in Tanai Township during the outbreak of civil war in Myanmar since 2021.

Near the town of Tanai are Burmese amber sites of paleontological interest including the recently uncovered Inzutzut, Angbamo, and Xipiugong sites.
