= Tanai, Myanmar =

Town in Kachin State, Myanmar

Danai တနိုင်းမြို့
- Town
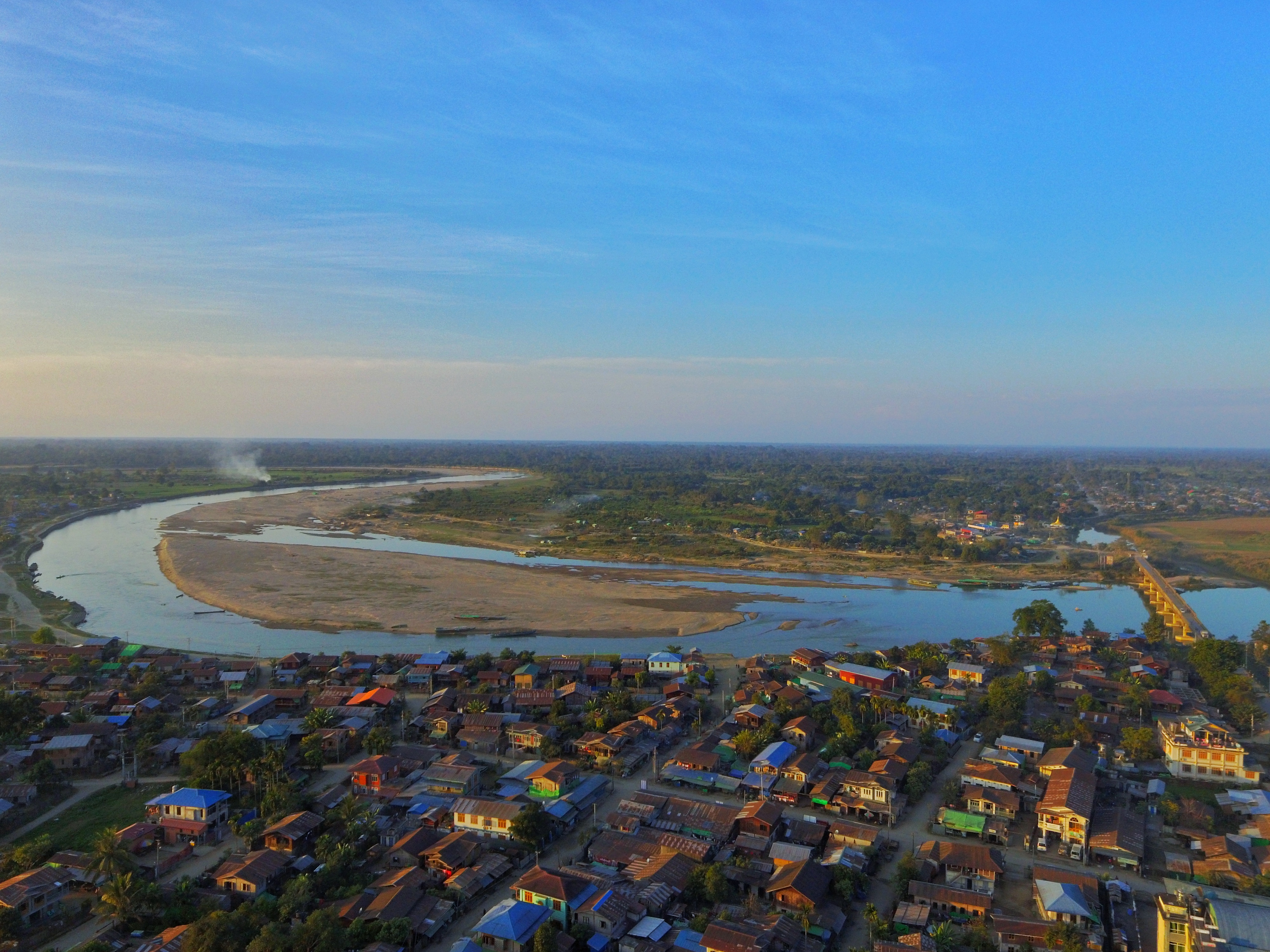

- Location in Burma
- Coordinates: 26°21′0″N 96°43′0″E
- Country: Myanmar
- Division: Kachin State
- District: Tanai District
- Township: Tanai Township

Area
  - Total: 1.5 sq mi (3.9 km^{2})

Population (2019)
  - Total: 17,884
  - Density: 12,000/sq mi (4,600/km^{2})
- Time zone: UTC+6.30 (MMT)

Tanai or Danai (Burmese: တနိုင်းမြို့) is a town in Kachin State, in the northernmost part of Myanmar. It is the principal town of Tanai Township and Tanai District.

Burmese amber is found in the area around Tanai, leading to paleontological discoveries like the Cretoperipatus species of worm.

== Notable residents ==
- Sut Ring Pan (journalist).
