= Burma Road =

Road linking Burma (Myanmar) with southwestern China opened in 1938

- Traditional Chinese: 滇緬公路
- Simplified Chinese: 滇缅公路
- Literal meaning: Yunnan–Burma Highway
Transcriptions
Standard Mandarin
- Hanyu Pinyin: Diān Miǎn gōnglù

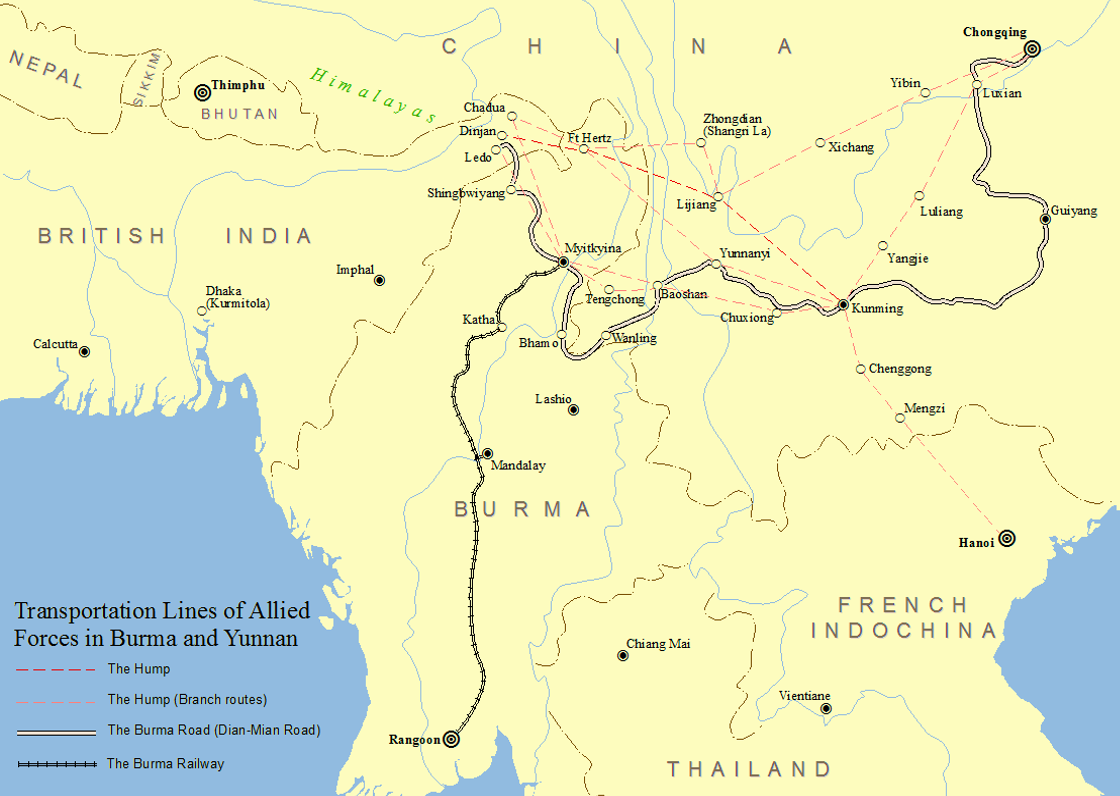
Transportation of Allied Forces in Burma and southwestern China including the Burma Road

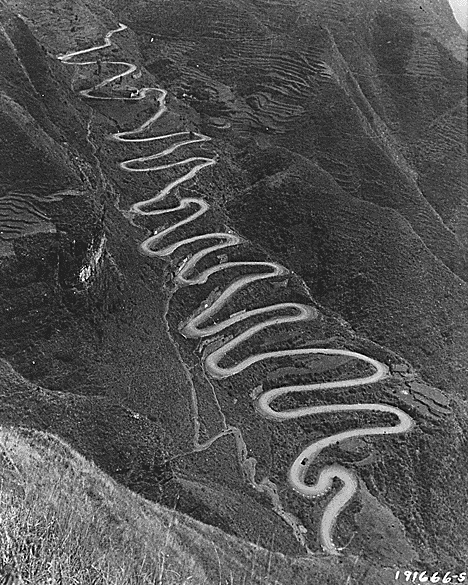
The Ledo Road extension "Twenty-Four Bends" (25.821725°N, 105.202600°E), often mistaken for a segment of the Burma Road, is actually in Qinglong County, Guizhou Province. During the Second Sino-Japanese War, Western supplies carried over the Burma Road first arrived at Kunming, the capital of Yunnan province, then traveled over mountain roads, such as the "24 Bends," passing through cities such as Guiyang, the capital of Guizhou province, before continuing to Chongqing.

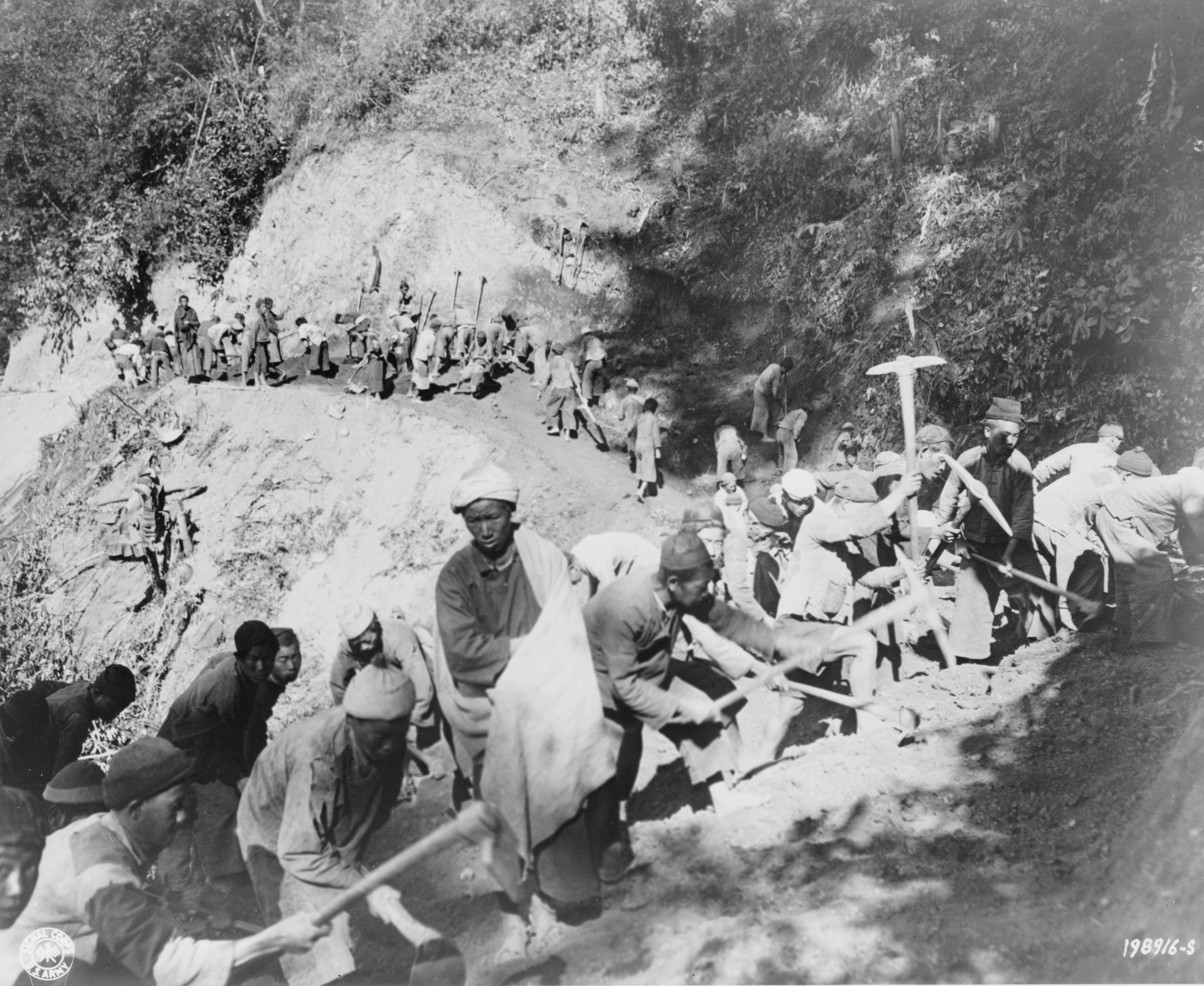
Burmese and Chinese laborers using hand tools to reopen the Burma Road in 1944

The Burma Road (Chinese: 滇缅公路) was a road linking Burma (now known as Myanmar) with southwest China. Its terminals were Lashio, Burma, in the south and Kunming, China, the capital of Yunnan province in the north. It was built in 1937–1938 while Burma was a British colony to convey supplies to China during the Second Sino-Japanese War. Preventing the flow of supplies on the road helped motivate the occupation of Burma by the Empire of Japan in 1942 during World War II. Use of the road was restored to the Allies in 1945 after the completion of the Ledo Road. Some parts of the old road are still visible today.

== History ==
The road is 717 miles (1,154 km) long and runs through rough mountain country. The sections from Kunming to the Burmese border were built by 200,000 Burmese and Chinese laborers during the Second Sino-Japanese War in 1937 and completed by 1938 in order to circumvent the Japanese blockade of China. The construction project was coordinated by Chih-Ping Chen.

Burma Road (Operational October 18, 1938)
Modern Name	Imperial/Historical Name	Feature Type
Lashio	Lashio (British Burma)	Terminus
Wanding	Wanting (romanized)	Border Crossing
Longling	Lungling	City
Huitong Bridge	Huitongqiao	Bridge (Salween River)
Baoshan	Paoshan	City
Gongguo Bridge	Gongguoqiao	Bridge ("Lancang" Chinese river name, "Mekong" international)
Dali	Tali-Fu	City
Chuxiong	Tsuyung	City
Kunming	Yunnan-Fu	Terminus

During World War II, the Allies used the Burma Road to transport materiel to aid China's war effort, especially after China lost the most efficient route for supplies to reach the Chinese interior via Nanning on November 24, 1939 in the Battle of South Guangxi and later through French Indochina (September 1940). Supplies from San Francisco for example would land at Rangoon (now Yangon), moved by rail to Lashio where the road started in Burma, up steep gradients before crossing into China over the Wanding bridge. The Chinese stretch of the road continued for some 500 miles through rural Yunnan terrain before ending up in Kunming.

In July 1940, Britain yielded to Japanese diplomatic pressure and closed the Burma Road for three months. The Japanese overran Burma in 1942, closing the Burma Road. The Allies thereafter supplied China by air, flying "over The Hump" from India, which initially proved fatally dangerous and woefully inadequate, leading U.S. army general Joseph Stilwell to obsessively pursue the goal of reopening the Burma Road.

The Allies recaptured northern Burma in late 1944, which allowed the Ledo Road from Ledo to connect to the old Burma Road at Wanding, Yunnan province. The first trucks reached the Chinese frontier by this route on January 28, 1945. The first convoy reached Kunming on February 4, 1945.

== In media ==
- Burma Convoy (1941)
- Kukan (1941)
- A Yank on the Burma Road (1942)
- Bombs Over Burma (1942)
- The Battle of China (1944)
- Objective, Burma! (1945)

== See also ==
- Ledo Road
- China National Highway 320, which the Burma Road is now a part of
- Tea Horse Road, ancient Silk Road segment over the same area
- Hangrui Expressway, the modern road along this route
- Yunnan-Burma Railway
- Burma Road (Israel), wartime makeshift named for the original Burma Road
