= National Highway 38 (India, old numbering) =

Old numbering of road in India

National Highway 38
- Map of Old NH38 in red
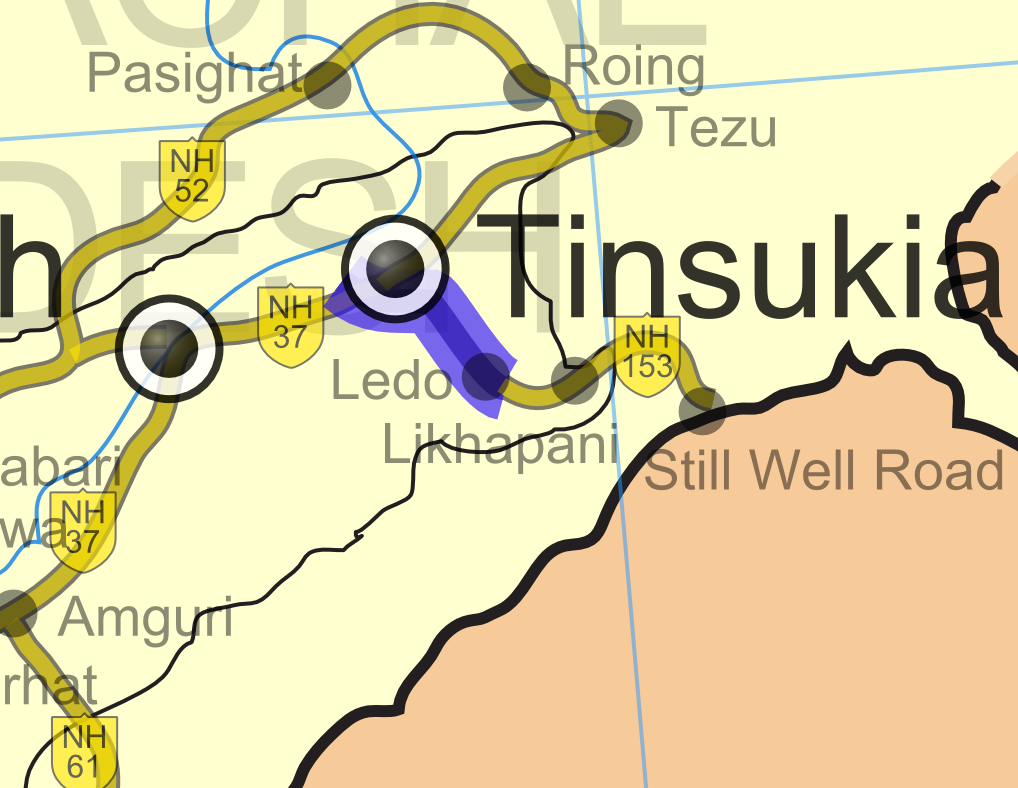

Route information
- Length: 54 km (34 mi)

Major junctions
- West end: Makum, Assam
- East end: Lekhapani, Assam

Location
- Country: India
- States: Assam
- Primary destinations: Digboi - Ledo

Highway system
- Roads in India; Expressways; National; State; Asian
← NH 37A	→ NH 39

National Highway 38 (NH 38) was a short National Highway of India entirely within the state of Assam that connected Makum and Lekhapani. It covered a distance of 54 km (34 mi). It became a part of NH 315 under new renumbering legislation.

== Route ==
- Digboi
- Margherita
- Ledo

== See also ==
- List of national highways in India
- National Highways Development Project
