= Lake of No Return =

Lake in Myanmar

- ပြန်လမ်းမဲ့ရေကန် (Burmese)
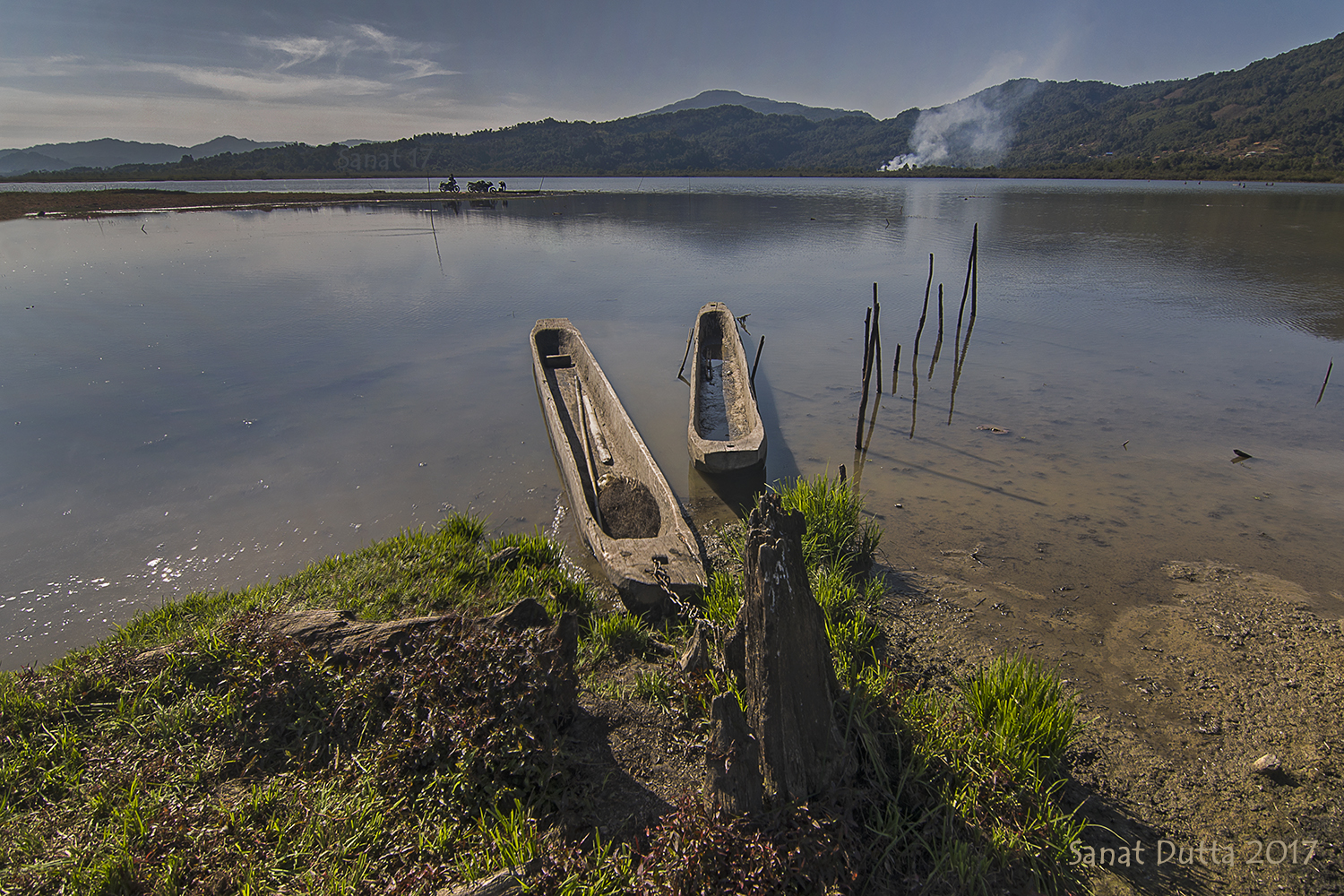
- Lake of no return

- Location within Myanmar
- Coordinates: 27°13′9″N 96°8′37.9″E
- Basin countries: Myanmar
- Max. length: 1.4 km (0.87 mi)
- Max. width: 0.8 km (0.50 mi)
- Surface elevation: 865 m (2,838 ft)
- Islands: No

Location of the Lake of No Return in Myanmar

Lake of No Return, also referred to as Naung Yang in Tai languages, is a body of water in Myanmar, lying in the area of the Pangsau Pass 1136 metres (3727 feet) on the India–Myanmar border south of Pangsau (also called Pansaung) village. The lake is 1.4 km in length and 0.8 km in width at its widest part. It is located 2.5 km to the southwest of the Ledo Road, formerly called Stilwell Road, the road the Western Allies started building in 1942 to supply the Chinese armies of Chiang Kai-shek.

The area is home to the Tangsa community. Since the improvement of relations between India and Myanmar, the lake has come to play a part in the development of tourism in the nearby Indian Changlang District, which borders Myanmar.

== Legends ==
The most common account of the origin of the lake's name is the one told, for instance, on the Changlang District's website (the district is in Arunachal Pradesh, India), which speculates that the name is due to the number of Allied aircraft (on their approach to The Hump) crashlanded in it during World War II, a story repeated in both the Indian press and in Indian fiction. American sources repeat that account, for instance in the 2008 book by Brendan I. Koerner, Now the Hell Will Start: One Soldier's Flight from the Greatest Manhunt of World War II, about the life of Herman Perry, a U.S. serviceman working on the Ledo Road who fled into the jungle and ended up marrying into the Naga tribe (of which the Tangsa are a subset): "The Americans called it the Lake of No Return, on account of all the crashed planes concealed in its depths."

At least three more stories explain the name. The second has it that a group of Japanese soldiers returning from battle lost their way and ended up at the lake. There, they were stricken by malaria and died and hence it is called the Lake of No Return. According to a third story, US Army soldiers, working on the Ledo Road, were sent to examine the lake and got trapped by the undergrowth and perished trying to escape. A fourth story says this "is the 'lake of no return' [because] retreating British troops in 1942 got lost in quicksand." Adding myth to legend, one author claims he has encountered the name on a document written by one of the Ten Lost Tribes of Israel, which he claims still hides out in the area.

The lake still maintains its reputation; the Indian newspaper The Telegraph reported, in a story on the possible reopening of the Ledo Road in 2007, that "close by [Pansaung] is the Lake of No Return — the local Bermuda Triangle. According to folklore, aircraft that fly over the lake never return." The lake's reputation is advertised in hopes of making the area more attractive to tourists: "Who knows, the ‘Indian’ Bermuda Triangle might just turn out to be the next tourist-puller of the region."

In a recent article Joydeep Sircar has claimed to have solved the 'mystery' behind the Lake of No Return, which he visited in 2002. According to him, none of the legends associated with the name have any basis in fact.

== See also ==
- Ledo Road (Stillwell Road)
- Pangsau Pass
- Hukawng Valley
