= Dehing Patkai Festival =

Annual festival in Assam, India

- Begins: 15 February 2027
- Ends: 19 February 2027
- Frequency: annual
- Locations: Lekhapani, Tinsukia, Assam
- Years active: 23
- Inaugurated: December 2002
- Previous event: 2026
- Next event: 2027

The Dihing Patkai Festival is an annual festival held at Lekhapani in Tinsukia district of Assam. The festival is named after the majestic Patkai range and the mischievous Dihing River. It is organized by the Government of Assam, providing the tourists with boundless chances for fun and feast.

This festival was first started in December 2002, and the then President of India Dr. APJ Abdul Kalam was the honourable chief guest .

== Events ==
The festival incorporates indigenous communities fairs, tea heritage tours, golfing, adventure sports, and wildlife pleasure trip. Another attraction of the festival is that it offers a trip to the 2nd World War cemeteries. It also arranges for a trip to the Stilwell Road, which was once the passage to the golden land of Myanmar. Visitors can choose to go for an elephant safari and take a path into the wildness. Food Festival, Craft Fair, and Cultural Functions are also held during these days for the visitors. The Festival offers a wide range of adventure sports like angling, kayaking and parasailing. Trips to the Tea Gardens and the Digboi oil field are also a part of the festival.

== Gallery ==
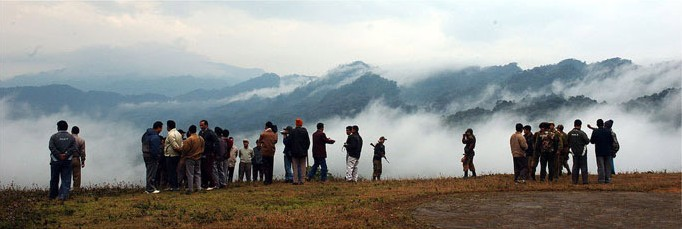
Patkai hills as seen from Pangsau Pass

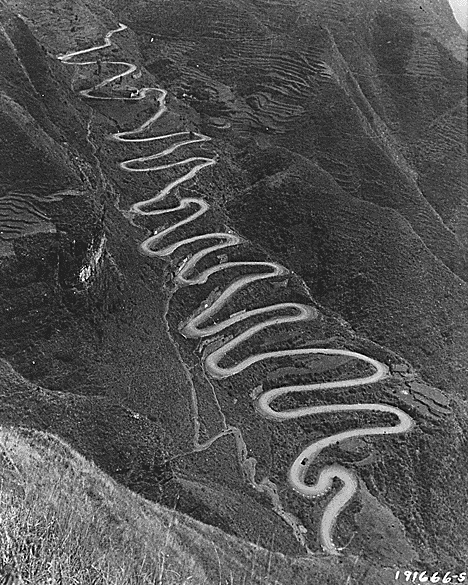
Ledo Road and Burma Road

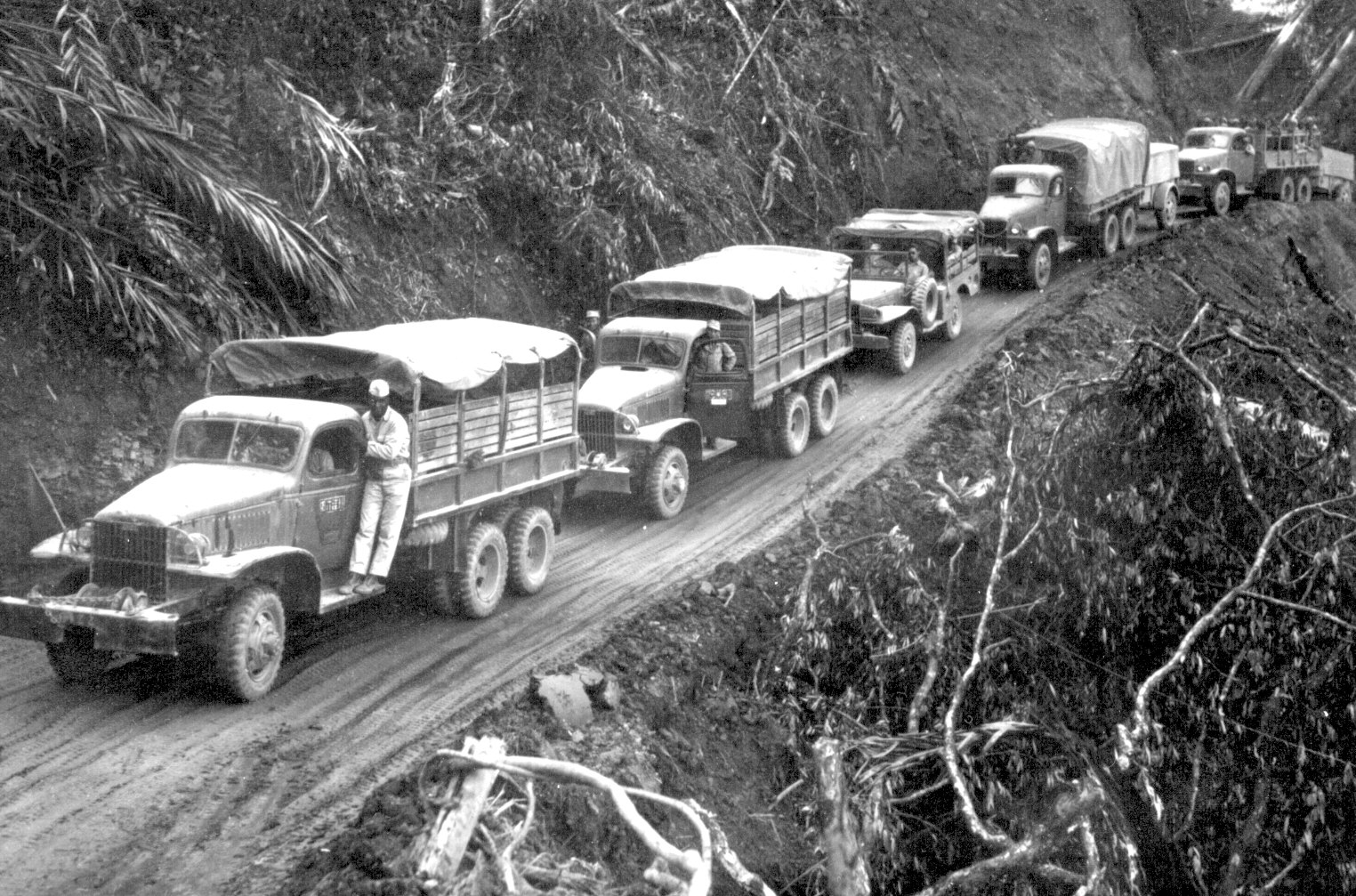
U.S.-built Army trucks over the Ledo supply road

== See also ==
- Assamese Culture
- Dihing River
- Patkai
