= Pangsau Pass =

Roads to Myanmar from Assam

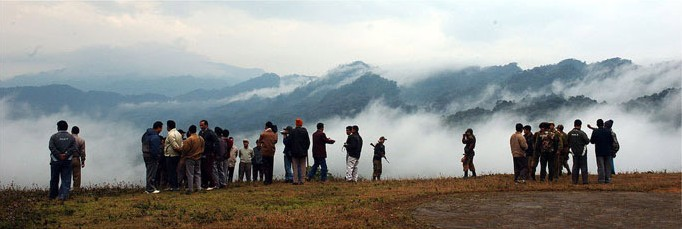

- Location within Myanmar
- Elevation: 1,136 m (3,727 ft)

Location
- Location: Part of Changlang district in Arunachal Pradesh on India–Myanmar border
- Range: Himalaya
- Coordinates: 27.2476°N 96.156°E

External videos
- Making the road from Ledo (Stilwell Road); Pangsau Pass. 8:30min. Filmed in 1942-43 by Gyles Mackrell

Pangsau Pass or Pan Saung Pass, 3,727 feet (1,136 m) (Burmese: ပန်ဆေလမ်းကြောင်းာ) in altitude, lies on the crest of the Patkai Hills on the India–Myanmar border. The pass offers one of the easiest routes into Burma from the Assam plains. The pass lies on the famous Ledo Road (Stillwell Road) and named after the closest village on Myanmar's territory, Pangsau, which lies 2 km east of the pass. India's undisputed easternmost point Chaukan Pass - east of Vijaynagar in the Changlang district - lies northeast of Pangsau Pass.

== History ==
=== British raj era ===
The British in the late 19th century looked at the pass as a possible railway route from India to Myitkyina in north Burma through the Hukawng Valley, all of which were part of the British Empire at the time, but no railway was built. In the 19th century, British railway builders had surveyed the Pangsau Pass, which is 1,136 metres (3,727 feet) high on the India-Burma border, on the Patkai crest, above Nampong, Arunachal Pradesh and Ledo, Tinsukia (part of Assam). They concluded that a track could be pushed through to Burma and down the Hukawng Valley. Although the proposal was dropped, the British prospected the Patkai Range for a road from Assam into northern Burma. British engineers had surveyed the route for a road for the first 130 kilometres (80 miles).

During World War II the pass became famous because of the Stilwell Road (Ledo Road) connecting British India to Nationalist Chinese forces fighting the Japanese in China. The pass was the large initial obstacle encountered by United States General Joseph "Vinegar Joe" Stilwell's forces in their effort to build a land route to supplement The Hump air route (after the other land route, the Burma Road was lost to advancing Japanese forces).

The Stilwell Road began at Ledo, Assam, the railhead, and passed through Tirap Gaon, Lekhapani, Tipong, Jagun, Jairampur (the Assam-Arunachal Pradesh boundary and beginning of Inner Line), and Nampong before switchbacking steeply upwards through densely forested hills to the pass, 12 kilometres (7.5 mi) away. The distance from Ledo to Pangsau Pass is 61 km (38 mi). Because of the fierce gradients and the mud, which made getting up to the pass difficult, it was nicknamed "Hell Pass" during the war.

=== Present era ===
The Pangsau Pass Winter Festival since 2007 is a 3-day joint India-Myanmar annual global village event organized during the 3rd week of January every year in Nampong, Arunachal Pradesh. It showcases diverse cultures of Northeast India and Myanmar including folk songs, folk dances, arts, crafts, ethnic foods, and traditional sports, and culture of Tangsa Naga tribe. Tangsa Rongrand War dance, Lungchang dance, Wancho dance, Bihu Dance, and Bamboo dance performances are held.

== See also ==
- Ledo Road (Stillwell Road)
- Lake of No Return
- Hukawng Valley
