= Jagun, Assam =

Village in Tinsukia district, Assam (India)

Coordinates: 27.380°N 95.897°E

Jagun is a small market in Margherita Tehsil in Tinsukia District of north-eastern state Assam, India. It is located around 7 km (4.3 mi) away from the nearest coalfield Tipong, 11 km (6.8 mi) away from Lekhapani, 17 km (11 mi) from away Tirap Gaon and 20 km (12 mi) away from Ledo. Jagun is connected by National Highway 315 to Ledo. National Highway 315, which connects Ledo to Indo-Myanmar border (Stillwell Road) across Pangsau Pass through Jagun. There are 2 government high school 12 middle school and more than 20 primary school.

== Nearest town and villages ==
- Tipong
- Lekhapani
- Tirap Gaon
- Ledo, Assam
