= Tirap Gaon, Ledo =

Tirap Gaon Teerap
- Rural
- Tirap Colliery
- Nickname: Colliery
- Location in Assam, India Tirap Gaon (India)
- Coordinates: 27°19′0″N 95°49′0″E
- Country: India
- State: Assam
- District: Tinsukia
- Named for: Coal Colliery namely Tirap Colliery under Ledo Coal Division

Government
  - Type: Panchayat Raj under State Government
  - Body: Gaon Panchayat
- Elevation: 333 m (1,093 ft)

Population (2011)
  - Total: 3,487

Languages
  - Official: Assamese
- Time zone: UTC+5:30 (IST)
- PIN: 786182
- ISO 3166 code: IN-AS
- Vehicle registration: AS
- Coastline: 0 kilometres (0 mi)

Tirap Gaon, Ledo also known as Tirap Colliery, is a small village in Margherita Tehsil in Tinsukia District of north-eastern state Assam, India. It is located around 3 km away from nearest town Ledo, 11 km away from sub-divisional town Margherita and 60 km away from district headquarter Tinsukia. Tirap Gaon is connected to Makum by National Highway 38 (old numbering).

The Indian census counts Tirap Gaon as two villages: No.1 and No.2.

This place is known for opencast coal mining since 1983 under North Eastern Coalfields, a unit of the state-owned Coal India Limited. In 2018–2019, an international team of researchers discovered fossil impressions of two previously unknown species of bamboo (Bambusiculmus tirapensis and Bambusiculmus makumensis) in the Tirap coalmine. These fossils date back to about 25 million years ago, falling in the late Oligocene period. This discovery strengthened the theory that bamboo came to Asia from India and not from Europe. It also challenged the previous hypothesis that Asian bamboo spread from the Yunnan region of China to India.

== Nearest town and villages ==
- Ledo, Assam
- Lekhapani
- Margherita
- Tipong
- Jagun
