= Bargolai =

Bargolai Baragolai Bargolai, Borgolai
- Rural
- Bargolai
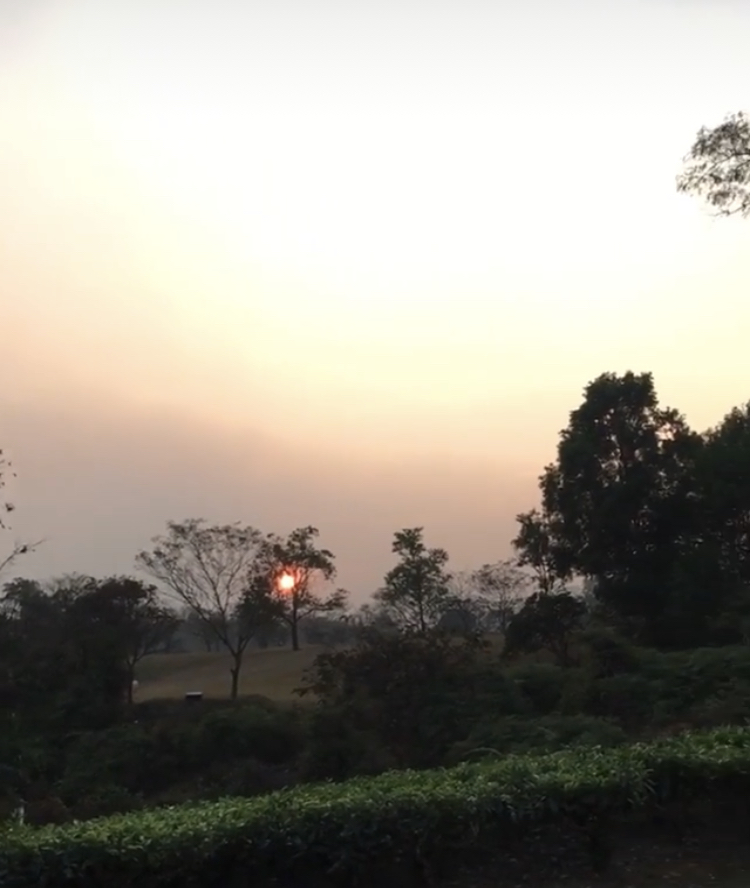
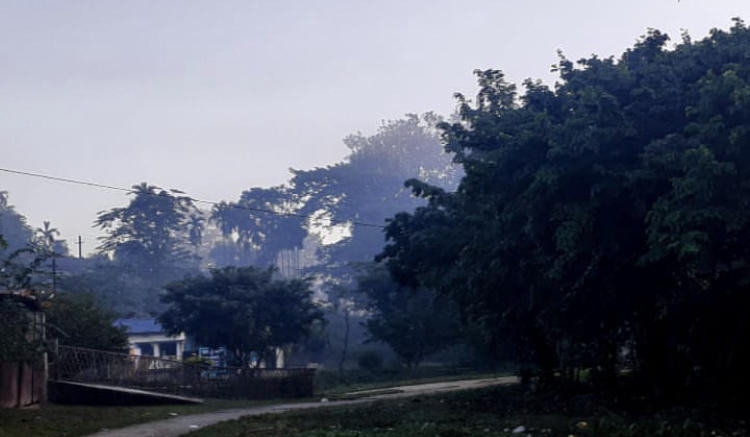
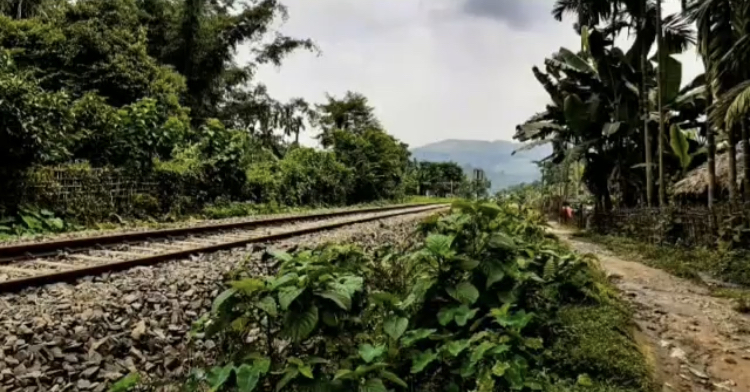
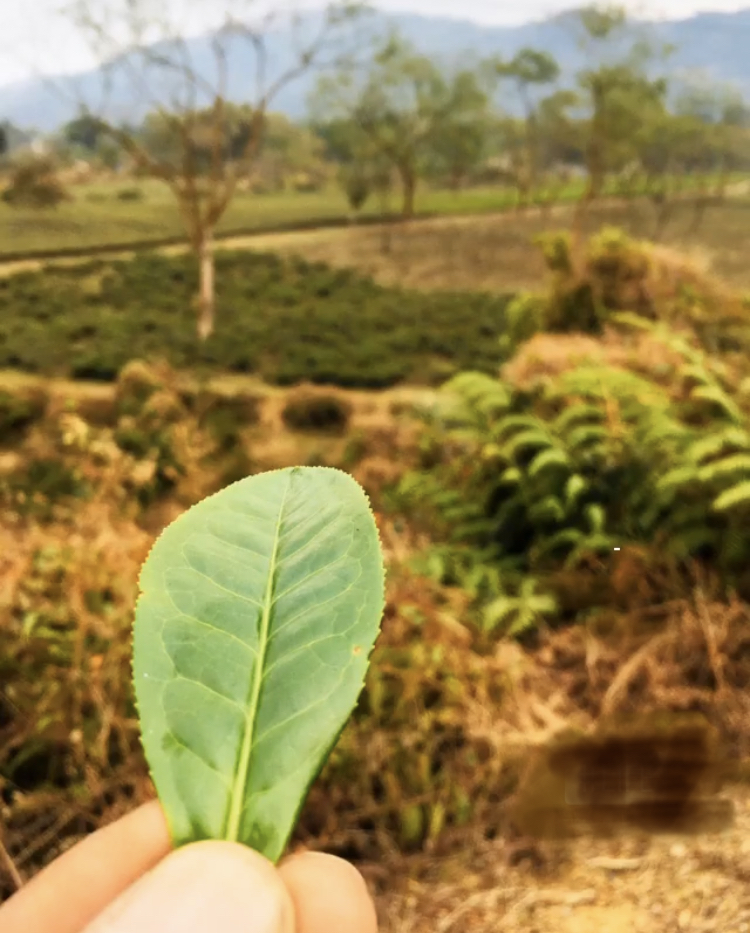
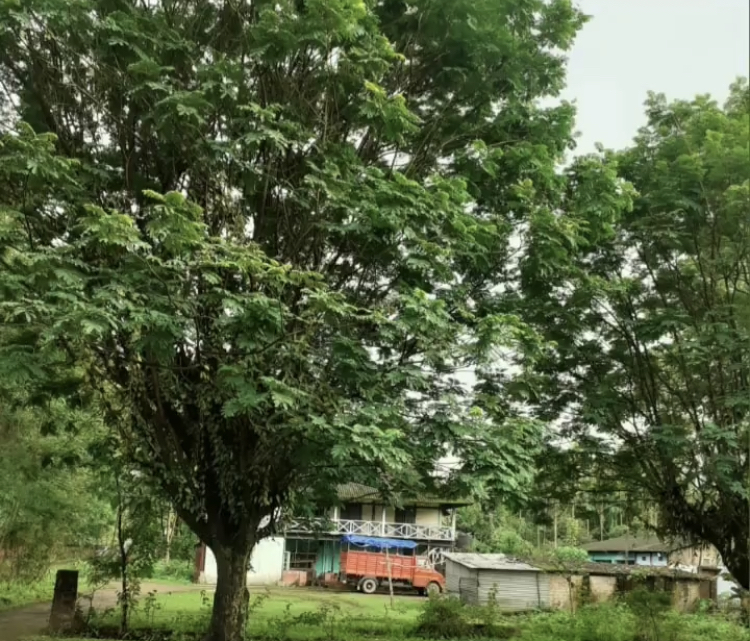

- Location in Assam, India Bargolai (India)
- Coordinates: 27°17′06″N 95°42′34″E
- Country: India
- State: Assam
- District: Tinsukia

Government
  - Type: Panchayat Raj under State Government
  - Body: Bargolai Gaon Panchayat

Population (2001)
  - Total: 5,034

Languages
  - Official: Assamese
- Time zone: UTC+5:30 (IST)
- Postal code: 786181
- Vehicle registration: AS-23

Bargolai is a village located in Margherita, a sub-district of Tinsukia District in the state of Assam, India.

== Demographics ==
As of the 2001 India census, Bargolai had a population of 5,034. Males constitute 52% of the population and females 48%. Bargolai has an average literacy rate of 66%, higher than the national average of 59.5%; with male literacy of 75% and female literacy of 56%. 11% of the population is under 6 years of age.

== Education ==
Bargolai has an average literacy rate of 66%, higher than the national average of 59.5%: male literacy is 61%, and female literacy is 65%. Various schools are situated in Bargolai. Some of the prominent ones are:

- Vivekananda Kendra Vidyalaya(NEC), Baragolai
- Blue Bird Senior Secondary School, Baragolai
- Bargolai Colliery Assamese School
- Bargolai Colliery Bengali School
- Bargolai Colliery Nepali School
- Adarsh Hindi Senior Secondary School, Bargolai
- Margaret Memorial High School, Bargolai
- Kid-zee and Sunshine Senior Secondary School, Bargolai

SKILL DEVELOPMENT CENTERS:

- Abacus Computer Academy, Bargolai Branch

== Politics ==
Bargolai is part of Goan Panchayat rule headed by President (Gaon Pradhan) elected by the public of the Bargolai Village in term of 5 Years. Bargolai is part of Margherita Assembly. Margherita is part of Dibrugarh (Lok Sabha constituency). And the current M.P from this region is Mr. Sarbananda Sonowal. Margherita is also 124th Legislative Assembly constituency and is presently represented by Bhaskar Sharma.[6]

== Economy ==
Coal mines of Bargolai Colliery under North Eastern Coalfields located here and it’s is currently un-operational. Tea is the other developed industries. There are various Tea industries, some of them are listed below:

- Green Gold Tea Industries
- NEFA Tea Industries
- Nivedita Tea Industry
- Tamuli Green Leaves

== Transportation ==
Bargolai is well connected with all the major towns and districts both by road and rail. The NH 38 passes through and is a stretch of approximately 54 km, starting point being Ledo. Nearest railway station are Margherita Railway Station and Ledo Railway Station both are in distance of 4 km respectively from the village and Tinsukia railway station is just 54 km, about 1H 30Mins drive from the village. With RAJDHANI Express and other major trains running from Tinsukia, it is well connected to the rest of India. There are two local trains a day connecting Margherita to Dibrugarh (via Tinsukia) and one express train running from Ledo to Guwahati to connect with capital of the state, i.e., Guwahati. Bargolai have nearest city of Margherita, which serves as a transit point to many parts of Arunachal Pradesh and buses ply regularly to and from Changlang, Miao and Jairampur. Tourists, while going to Arunachal, can get their passes from the office of A.P.S.T. Assam State Transport Corporation (ASTC) buses and a number of other private buses are also available from there. The nearest airport is in Dibrugarh, 100 km away.
