= Lekhapani =

Lekhapani Leekhapani
- Rural
- Lekhapani
- Nicknames: Last Point of NEFR, Indian Railways
- Location in Assam, India Lekhapani (India)
- Coordinates: 27°19′0″N 95°54′0″E
- Country: India
- State: Assam
- District: Tinsukia

Government
  - Type: Panchayat Raj under State Government
  - Body: Gaon Panchayat
- Elevation: 150 m (490 ft)

Languages
  - Official: Assamese
- Time zone: UTC+5:30 (IST)
- PIN: 786182
- ISO 3166 code: IN-AS
- Vehicle registration: AS-23
- Coastline: 0 kilometres (0 mi)

Lekhapani is a town in Tinsukia district, Assam, India.

and it is also the last frontier of North Frontier Railway(but it is inoperative since 1993)Lekhapani railway station

== Geography ==
It is located at an elevation of 150 m above MSL.

== Transport ==
Lekhapani is connected by National Highway 315 from Makum. National Highway 315 connects Ledo to Indo-Myanmar border i.e. Pangsau Pass. The eastern most railway station of India, Lekhapani railway station is a defunct one but surveys are on to extend the line to Kharsang, Arunachal Pradesh and revive the station soon.

== Nearest towns and villages ==
- Tirap Gaon
- Ledo, Assam
- Margherita
- Tipong
