= List of highways numbered 313 =

The following highways are numbered 313:

== Canada ==
- Manitoba Provincial Road 313
- New Brunswick Route 313
- Prince Edward Island Route 313

== China ==
- China National Highway 313

== Costa Rica ==
- National Route 313

== India ==
- National Highway 313 (India)

== Japan ==
- Japan National Route 313

== United States ==
- Arkansas Highway 313
- Connecticut Route 313
- County Road 313 (Gilchrist County, Florida)
- Georgia State Route 313
- Indiana State Road 313 (former)
- Kentucky Route 313
- Louisiana Highway 313
- Maryland Route 313
  - Maryland Route 313A
- Minnesota State Highway 313
- Mississippi Highway 313
- Montana Secondary Highway 313
- New Mexico State Road 313
- New York:
  - New York State Route 313
  - County Route 313 (Erie County, New York)
- Ohio State Route 313
- Pennsylvania Route 313
- Tennessee State Route 313
- Texas:
  - Texas State Highway 313 (former)
  - Farm to Market Road 313
- Utah State Route 313
- Vermont Route 313
- Virginia State Route 313
  - Virginia State Route 313 (former)
- Wyoming Highway 313

Other areas:

- Puerto Rico Highway 313
- U.S. Virgin Islands Highway 313

Preceded by 312	Lists of highways 313	Succeeded by 314
