= Margherita, Assam =

Census town in Assam, India

Margherita
- Sub-District
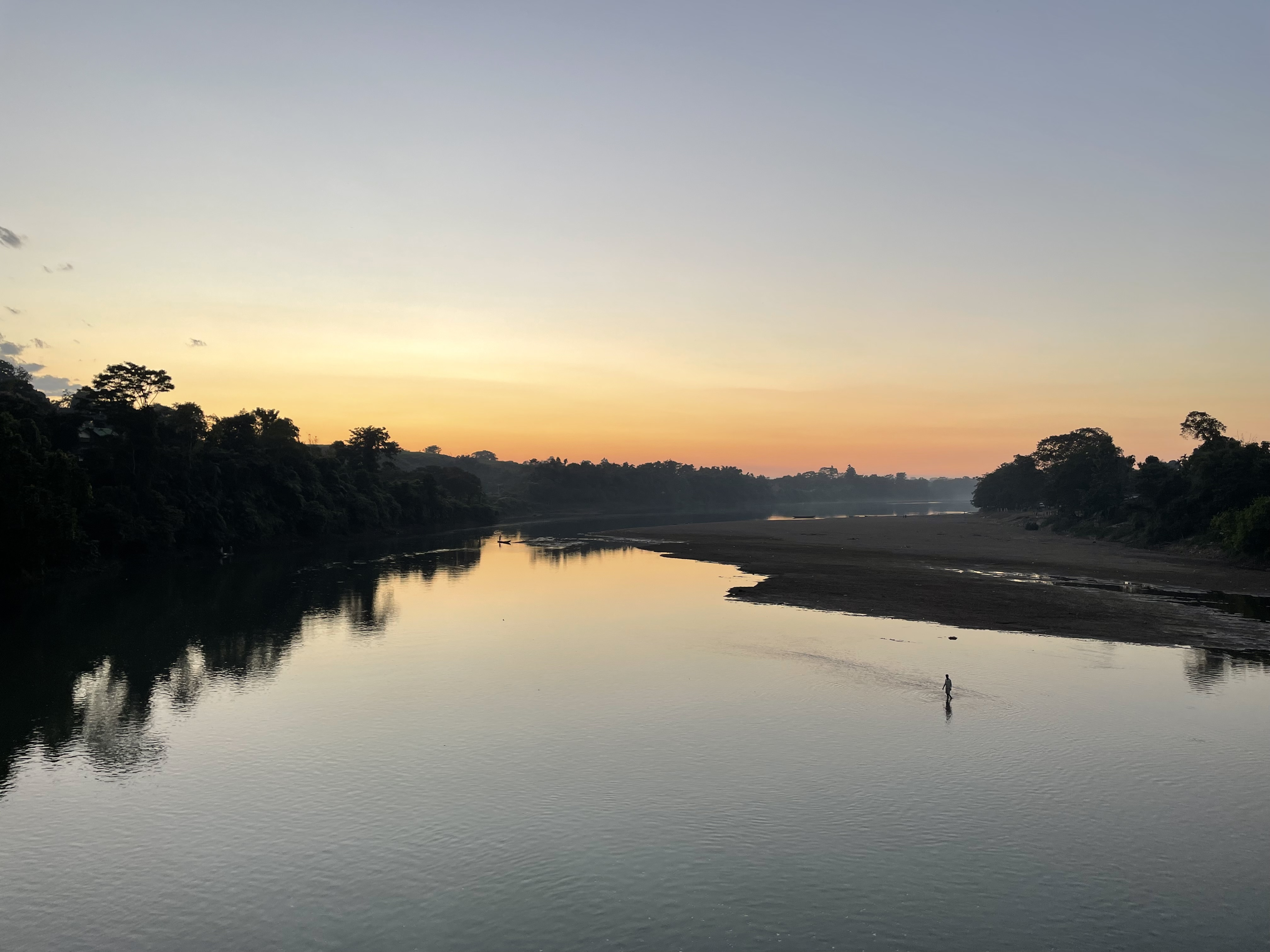
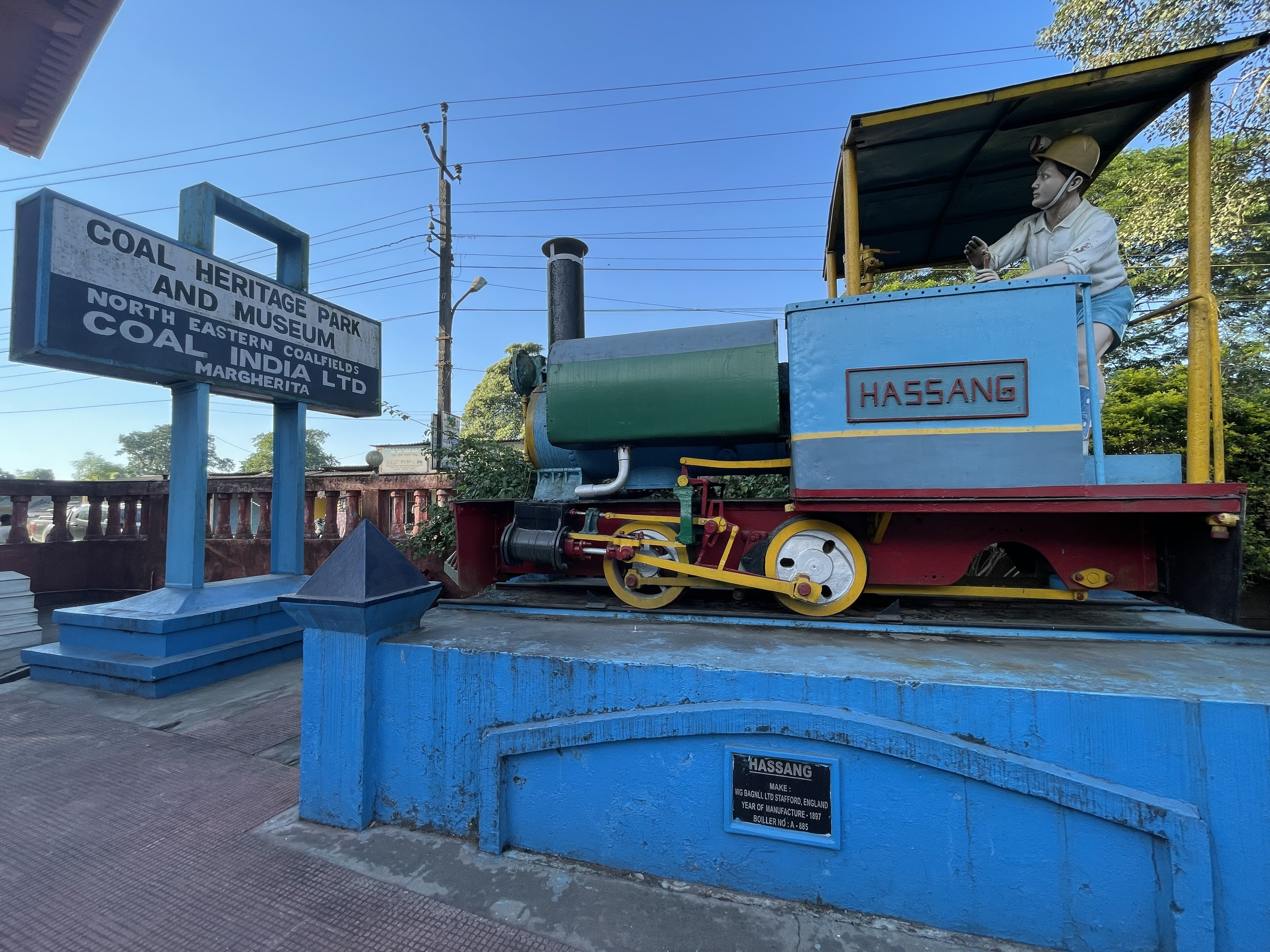
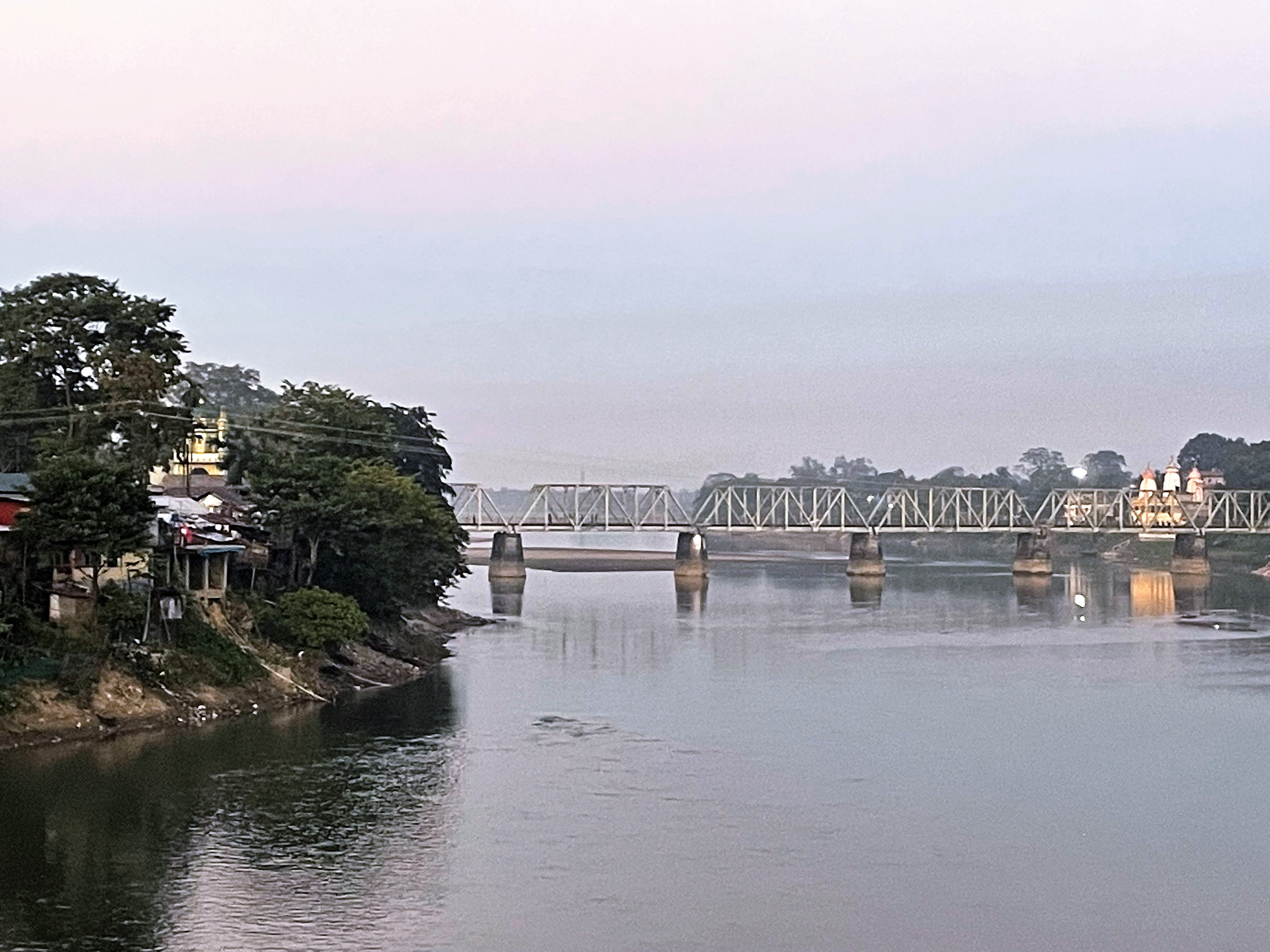
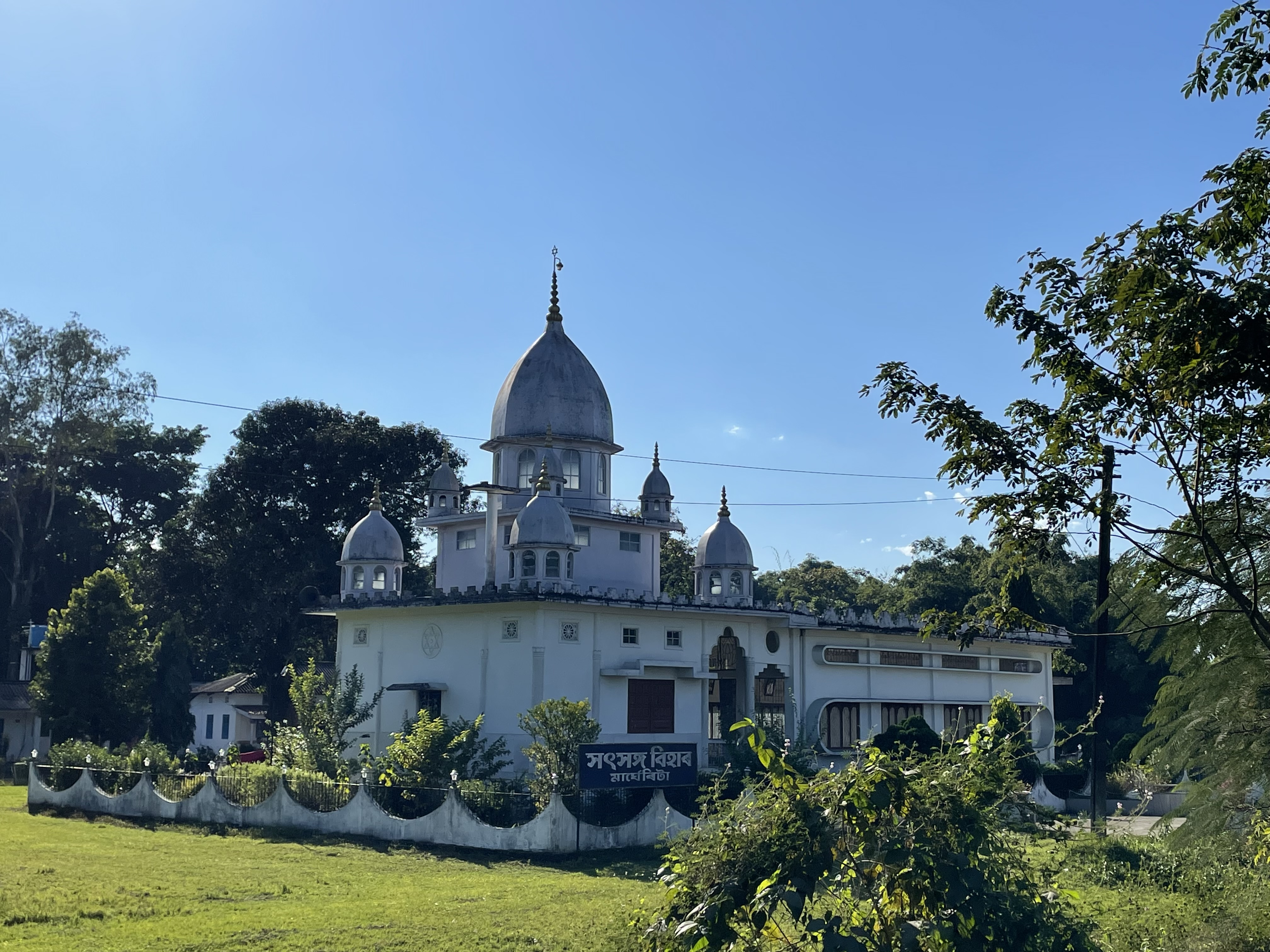
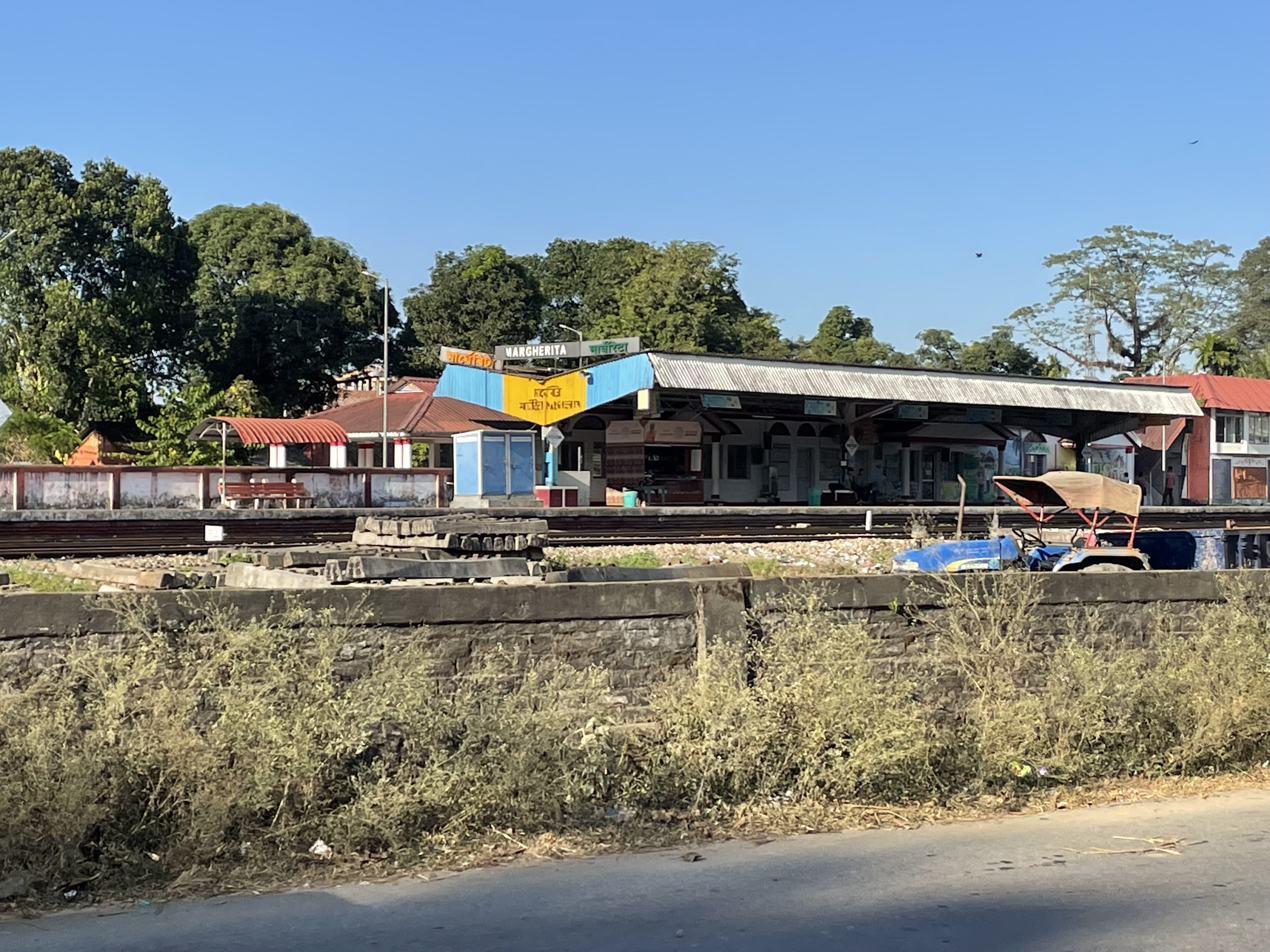
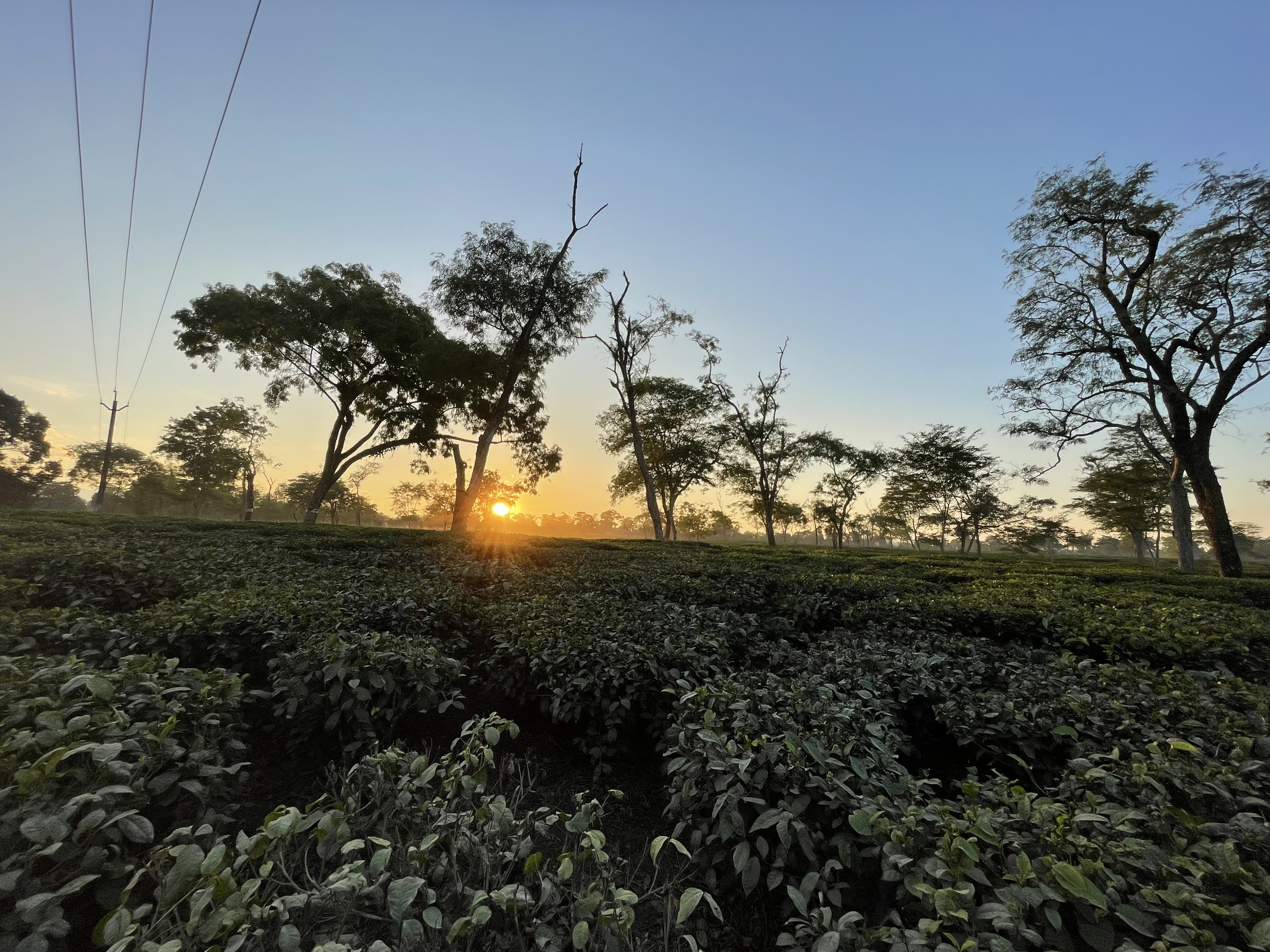
- From bottom; left to right: Tea garden near Namdang Tea Estate, Satsang Vihar, Coal Heritage Park & Museum, Dehing River at sunset viewed from Dehing Bridge, Railway Bridge, Margherita Train Station.

- Location in Assam, India Margherita (India)
- Coordinates: 27.28°N 95.68°E
- Country: India
- State: Assam
- District: Tinsukia
- Established: 1926
- Named for: Queen Margherita of Savoy

Government
  - Body: Margherita Municipal Board
- Elevation: 162 m (531 ft)

Population (2011)
  - Total: 26,914

Languages
  - Official: Assamese
- Time zone: UTC+5:30 (IST)
- PIN: 786181
- Telephone code: 91 – (0) 3751 – XX XXXX
- ISO 3166 code: IN-AS
- Vehicle registration: AS-23
- Website: http://margheritamb.com/

Margherita (IPA: ˌmɑːgəˈrɪtə) is a census town in Tinsukia district in the Indian state of Assam. The sub-district town is surrounded by hills, tea gardens, forests and the Dihing River. It has a golf course at the foot of the hills and a small stream running through. Although considered to be a small town, Margherita has several hospitals and educational institutions and is regularly frequented by visitors on account of it being the last proper town of Upper Assam. The name Margherita actually derives from the Italian queen and dates back to the late 19th century as a token appreciation for the Italian Chief Engineer of a rail section Chevalier R Paganini who supervised the construction. Margherita was known for its collieries much developed by the British. Coal India Ltd has the biggest industrial plant here. The town is also known as Coal Queen as it is famous for coal business. Apart from this there are other industrial plants like Kitply and Tata Tea (amalgamated plantations), along with minor plywood industries and tea gardens. Margherita has Tea Estates of the Williamson Magor Group (McLeod Russel India Limited). Namdang Tea Estate, Dirok Tea Estate, Dehing Tea Estate, Bogapani Tea Estate and Margherita Tea Estate are the 5 famous estates of the McLeod Russel India Limited Group situated at the sub division Margherita. McLeod Russel India Limited is one of the largest tea producers in Asia.

== Geography ==
Margherita is located at 27.28°N 95.68°E. It has an average elevation of 162 metres (531 feet). The Dihing River flows through Margherita. The Patkai Hills are visible from the town.

== Demographics ==
As of 2001 India census, Margherita had a population of 23,836. Males constitute 52% of the population and females 48%. Margherita has an average literacy rate of 76%, higher than the national average of 59.5%: male literacy is 81%, and female literacy is 71%. In Margherita, 11% of the population is under 6 years of age. The main communities of the area includes Assamese, Bengali, Nepali, Bihari, Singpho etc.

=== Language ===
Languages spoken in Margherita (2011)
1. Bengali (42.0%)
2. Assamese (24.1%)
3. Hindi (15.2%)
4. Nepali (4.35%)
5. Sadri (3.83%)
6. others (10.5%)

Bengali is the most spoken language at 11,299 speakers, followed by Assamese at 6,496, Hindi is spoken by 4,088 people, Nepali at 1,172 and Sadri at 1,030.

== Etymology ==
Before getting its existing name, Margherita was known as Ma-Kum (Ahom, meaning the abode of all tribes). The name has its roots in the Dihing River Bridge which was built around 1880 by a team led by Italian engineer Chevalier Roberto Paganini who worked for the Assam Railways & Trading Company Ltd. From historical records, it is not quite clear whether the directors of that company renamed the place as a lasting tribute to that Italian engineer or if it was Paganini himself who, out of patriotism, christened the place in honour of Queen Margherita, the reigning Queen Consort of Italy.

== Transport ==
Margherita is well connected with all the major towns and districts both by road and rail. The NH 38 passes through the town and is a stretch of approximately 54 km, starting point being Ledo. Margherita has a railway station of its own and Tinsukia railway station is just 50 kilometres, about 1.5 hours drive from the town. With Rajdhanis and other long-distance trains running from Tinsukia, Margherita is well connected to the rest of India. There are three local trains a day connecting Margherita to Dibrugarh (via Tinsukia). Margherita serves as a transit point to many parts of Arunachal Pradesh and buses ply regularly to and from Changlang, Miao and Jairampur. Tourists, while going to Arunachal, can get their passes from the office of A.P.S.T. Assam State Transport Corporation (ASTC) buses and a number of other private buses are also available from there. The nearest airport is in Dibrugarh, 96 km away.

== Economy ==
North Eastern Coalfields operates from here and has its headquarters in the town. Plywood and tea are the other developed industries.

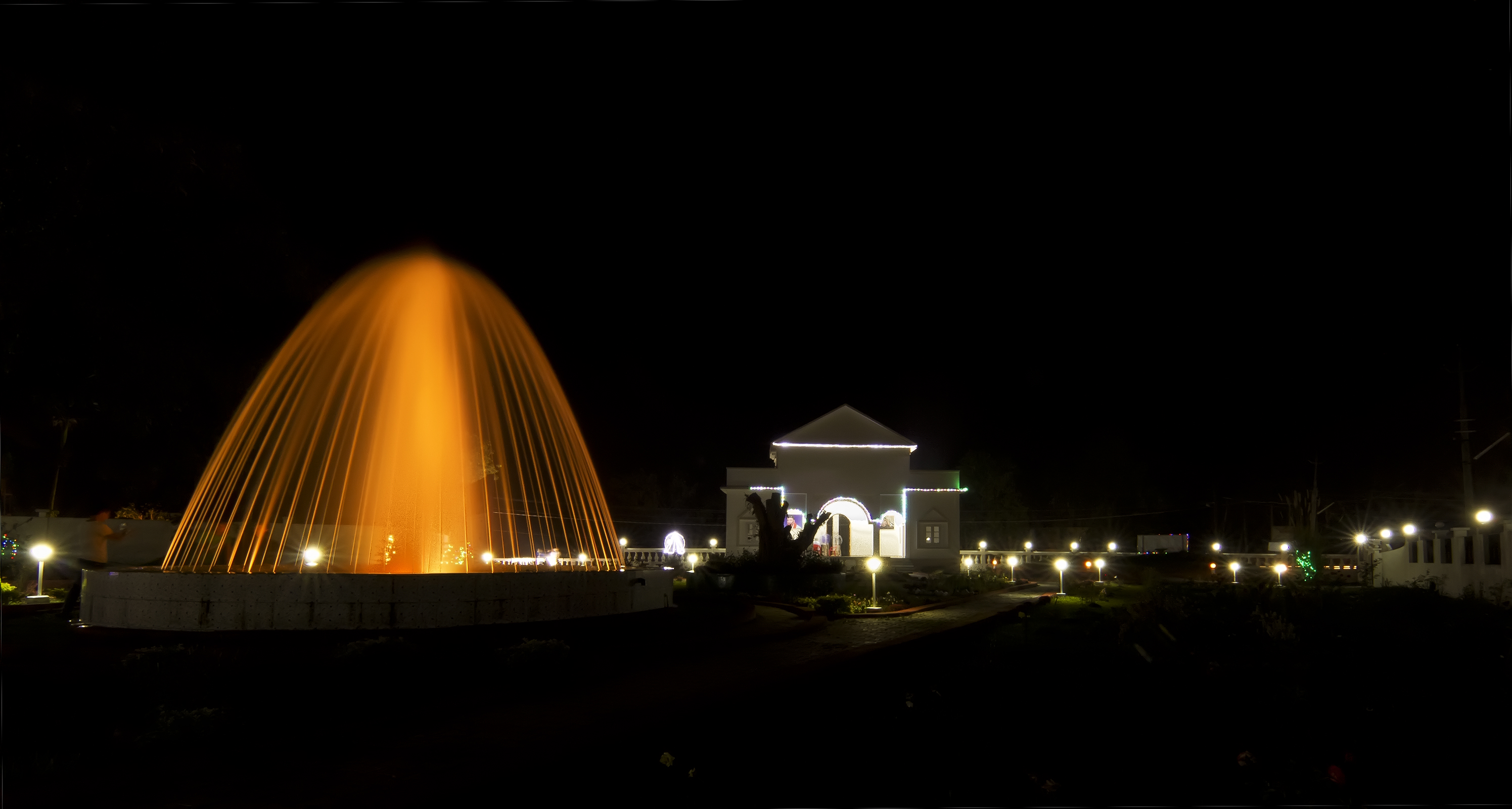
Dr. Bhupen Hazarika Children's Park, Margherita at night

== Politics ==
Margherita is part of Dibrugarh (Lok Sabha constituency). And the current M.P from this region is Mr. Sarbananda Sonowal. Margherita is also 124th Legislative Assembly constituency and is presently represented by Bhaskar Sharma.

== Education ==
Margherita has an average literacy rate of 76%, higher than the national average of 59.5%: male literacy is 81%, and female literacy is 71%.

Various schools and colleges are situated in Margherita. Some of the prominent ones are:

- Margherita College
- St. Mary's School, Margherita,
- Margherita Public Higher Secondary School,
- St. James' School, Margherita,
- Town High School, Margherita,
- Jatiya Vidyalaya, Margherita,
- A.R.&T. Co. High School, Margherita,
- Gandhi Vidya Mandir, Margherita,
- Margherita Hindi High School,
- Axom Junior College, Margherita,
- KIDZEE & Sun Shine High School, Margherita.
- Margherita Balya Bhawan, Margherita

== Media ==
Margherita has an All India Radio Relay station known as Akashvani Margherita. It broadcasts on FM frequencies.

== Nearest town and villages ==
- Bargolai
- Ledo, Assam
- Tirap Gaon
- Lekhapani
- Digboi
- Jagun
- Tipong
