= Gobindopur =

Gobindopur is a village in the Tinsukia district of Assam state in India.
