= Herman Perry =

United States Army soldier and murderer

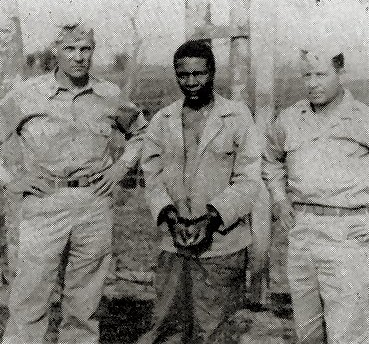
- Major Earl O. Cullum (left) and Capt. Joseph J. Armand (right) with Herman Perry (center) after the manhunt
- Born: May 16, 1922; Monroe, North Carolina, United States
- Died: March 15, 1945 (aged 22); Ledo Stockade, Ledo, British India
- Cause of death: Execution by hanging
- Other name: Jungle King
- Children: 1
- Status: Executed
- Convictions: Premeditated murder Desertion
- Penalty: Death

Details
- Victims: Lieutenant Harold Cady, 28
- Date: March 3, 1944
- Locations: Assam, British India
- Weapon: M1 carbine
- Date apprehended: March 9, 1945

Herman Perry (May 16, 1922 – March 15, 1945) was an African-American U.S. Army soldier during World War II, who deserted after fragging an unarmed white lieutenant attempting to arrest him. After being sentenced to death, he escaped custody, and a manhunt was launched while he lived in the jungle. Perry was eventually recaptured once more and court-martialed. He was hanged for murder and desertion, making him the only American soldier to be executed in the China Burma India Theater during World War II.

== Biography ==
Perry was born on May 16, 1922, in the rural outskirts of Monroe, North Carolina. His mother, teenager Flonnie Perry, and father Prouda Salsbrook were unmarried. Salsbrook left the family when Herman was young. Herman moved with his mother to Washington, D.C., and got a job as a butcher's apprentice. Following America's entry into the Second World War in December 1941, Perry was enlisted. He did not attend his first draft board appointment and was arrested for non-compliance. As a soldier in the Army's 849th Engineer Aviation Battalion, he served in the China-Burma-India Theater, helping to construct the Ledo Road.

On March 3, 1944, Perry's commanding officer, Lieutenant Harold A. Cady, attempted to apprehend him for dereliction of duty and place him in the area's military prison. Perry had previously served time in this prison and was well aware of the abuses that went on there. When he was found he was holding a rifle and repeatedly warned Cady not to approach him and to "get back."

Cady continued to advance and Perry fired his rifle, hitting Cady in the stomach, a wound which would prove fatal. Perry fled into the wilderness and lived out a fugitive's life of jungle survival, happenstance finding a morung; a bamboo structure on stilts built over a pig sty, which served as a bachelors' quarter for a tribe of the Naga people of northeastern India and northern Burma. It is unknown exactly how Perry managed to win the tribe over, but his familiarity with their language undoubtedly helped and he also offered them rations which he had taken from the military.

After adapting to the headhunting lifestyle of the tribe which the Ang, or village chief, told him was called Tgum Ga by the Burmese, he eventually won the Ang's respect and approval to the extent that he even married the Ang's 14-year-old daughter who later conceived his child.

A tribesman was sent to a nearby bazaar to help Perry obtain cigarettes only available on the black market. While there, he told others of a black American soldier living with his tribe. Word quickly spread and reached the local authorities, the British, and finally the U.S. Army. A Naga scout was sent to the village of Tgum Ga and returned to confirm the story. Upon being shown the photo, he confirmed the black American soldier to be Herman Perry.

On July 20, 1944, after the scout confirmed Perry was still at Tgum Gam at night, military policemen of the 502nd Military Police Battalion were sent to arrest Perry. Perry was inside a basha and was alerted to their presence, fleeing into the jungle. Several shots were fired with one hitting Perry in the chest. Perry was later captured and was brought out of the jungle to a nearby evacuation hospital. Despite his serious injury he survived, and as Perry's condition improved he was moved to the 20th General Hospital. While at the hospital and under the influence of morphine and other pain killers, he was questioned by the Criminal Investigation Division. His answers amounted to a confession, which he was forced to sign and eventually sealed his fate.

The court-martial took place at a tea plantation in Ledo on September 4, 1944, which took six and a half hours. In addition to murder, Perry was also charged with desertion and several counts of willful disobedience. Perry was sentenced to be dishonorably discharged, forfeit all pay and allowances, and to be hanged.

While pending execution at Ledo Stockade with formalities being dragged on for three months, Perry studied the guard's routines and was able to obtain a pair of wire cutters from a sympathetic visitor. After midnight on December 16, 1944, he cut his way through the wire fence and escaped. Following his escape, wanted posters of Herman Perry went up along the roads and fliers in Kachin and Burmese languages were distributed to native people and air-dropped over remote villages. Perry found his way to an abandoned timber camp, about five miles from Ledo, however he was spotted again and his whereabouts soon reached the military police back in Ledo. On New Year's Day 1945, the military policemen reached the timber camp; shots were fired, with one grazing Perry's ankle, but he managed to escape.

In February 1945, Brigadier General Joseph A. Cranston, Intermediate Section No. 2 commander of the China-Burma-India Theater, appointed Major Earl Owen Cullum, a former Dallas police officer and the commander of the 159th Military Police Battalion, to lead the manhunt. Perry was nearly caught twice by Cullum's team but escaped both times. He also suffered more serious wounds along the way. Perry was finally captured in Assam on March 9, 1945, and was placed under heavy guard at the 234th General Hospital. A few hours later he was taken to Chabua Stockade in Chabua, and was confined in an isolation cell. On March 15, 1945, he was taken back to Ledo Stockade where his death sentence was carried out.

Perry's body was placed in a coffin and taken to the Army cemetery at Margherita and buried in a grave with a white cross behind a hedge, about one hundred yards from all other soldier's graves. His mother received a letter two days later telling of his death. His story was initially covered up by Army leadership, but was revealed by Cullum in his later years. His young Naga wife had given birth, confirmed by a team who were searching for a downed plane in August 1945, who along the way reported encountering a young Naga woman with a curly-haired, dark-skinned infant along with cases of Army rations stored in a basha plastered with the wanted fliers of Perry previously air-dropped by the Army. In 1949 the remains of soldiers who died in the China-Burma-India Theater were repatriated to the U.S., with Perry's remains being sent to the post cemetery at Schofield Barracks, Hawaii; he was buried in an area reserved for soldiers who had been executed by the Army.

In 1990, Cullum would further publicize his first-hand accounts of the chase in his personally-published book, Manhunt in Burma and Assam: World War II in the China-Burma-India Theater. Prior to his death in 2003 at the age of 89, Cullum received a letter from Perry's half-brother Hank Johnson, and both engaged in a brief correspondence.

In 2007, Edna Wilson, Perry's last surviving sibling, having heard that her late brother was buried in Hawaii, asked the writer Brendan I. Koerner for help to locate and bring him back. With her own money, Wilson arranged to have her brother's body disinterred, cremated, and buried alongside his family members at a cemetery in Washington, D.C.

The Herman Perry story would later be republicized by Koerner in 2008 as Now the Hell Will Start: One Soldier's Flight From the Greatest Manhunt of World War II; George Pelecanos called it, "A fascinating, untold story of the Second World War, an incendiary social document, and a thrilling, campfire tale adventure." Other major news outlets would later pick up the story as a greater, complex reflection of race relations between African Americans and commanding white officers in the military, especially during the Jim Crow era.

== See also ==
- Capital punishment by the United States military
- List of people executed by the United States military
