= List of highways numbered 314 =

The following highways are numbered 314:

== Canada ==
- Manitoba Provincial Road 314
- Prince Edward Island Route 314

== China ==
- China National Highway 314

== Costa Rica ==
- National Route 314

== India ==
- National Highway 314 (India)

== Japan ==
- Japan National Route 314

== United States ==
- Arkansas Highway 314
- Connecticut Route 314
- Florida State Road 314 (former)
- Georgia State Route 314
- Iowa Highway 314 (former)
- Louisiana Highway 314
- Maryland Route 314
- Mississippi Highway 314
- Montana Secondary Highway 314
- New Mexico State Road 314
- New York State Route 314
  - New York State Route 314 (former)
- Ohio State Route 314
- Pennsylvania Route 314
- South Carolina Highway 314
- South Dakota Highway 314
- Tennessee State Route 314
- Texas:
  - Texas State Highway 314 (former)
  - Farm to Market Road 314
- Utah State Route 314
- Vermont Route 314
- Virginia State Route 314
  - Virginia State Route 314 (former)
- Wyoming Highway 314

Other areas:

- Puerto Rico Highway 314
- U.S. Virgin Islands Highway 314

Preceded by 313	Lists of highways 314	Succeeded by 315
