= National Highway 315 (India) =

National highway in India

National Highway 315
- Map of National Highway 315 in red

Route information
- Length: 111 km (69 mi)

Major junctions
- From: Makum
- To: Border

Location
- Country: India
- States: Assam, Arunachal Pradesh
- Primary destinations: Ledo – Lekhapani

Highway system
- Roads in India; Expressways; National; State; Asian

National Highway 315 (NH 315) is a National Highway in India. It connects Makum and Lekhapani to the Stilwell Road in Assam.
