= Lido Town =

- city
- Location in Assam, India Lido Town (India)
- Coordinates: 27.5000°N 95.3667°E
- Country: India
- State: Assam
- District: Tinsukia

Population (2001)
  - Total: 8,572

Languages
  - Official: Assamese
- Time zone: UTC+5:30 (IST)
- Vehicle registration: AS

Lido Town is a census town in Tinsukia district in the Indian state of Assam.

== Demographics ==
As of 2001 India census, Lido Town had a population of 8,572. Males constitute 52% of the population and females 48%. Lido Town has an average literacy rate of 71%, higher than the national average of 59.5%: male literacy is 77%, and female literacy is 65%. In Lido Town, 10% of the population is under 6 years of age.
