= Western Airlines Flight 701 =

Plane hijacking

Western Airlines Flight 701 was an aircraft hijacking that occurred on June 3, 1972, when the flight was seized by Willie Roger Holder and Catherine Marie Kerkow.

== Hijacking ==
On June 3, 1972, Willie Roger Holder and Catherine Marie Kerkow hijacked Western Airlines Flight 701 shortly after departure. The pair initially intended to divert the aircraft to North Vietnam but instead flew to Algeria. Following the landing, Holder and Kerkow joined the International Section of the Black Panther Party, remaining outside the United States for several years.

== Aftermath ==
After leaving Algeria, Holder and Kerkow lived in France for several years. In January 1975, the pair were arrested in Paris in connection with the hijacking.

The couple later separated. Holder eventually returned to the United States, while Kerkow disappeared and her whereabouts remain unknown.

== Later legal developments ==
In 1986, French authorities extradited Holder to the United States in connection with the 1972 hijacking.

In 1991, Holder was arrested in San Diego after authorities investigated him for allegedly planning another aircraft takeover. He was charged with violating federal probation rather than with a new hijacking offense, and prosecutors in New York considered whether to pursue additional charges related to the earlier hijacking.

== Cultural impact ==
The hijacking of Western Airlines Flight 701 is the subject of Brendan I. Koerner's 2013 non-fiction book The Skies Belong to Us, which examines the broader era of aircraft hijackings in the United States and places the incident within that historical context.

American songwriter Damien Jurado included short song called "Western Airlines Flight 701" on his 2025 album Private Hospital.
