= The Skies Belong to Us =

2013 non-fiction work by Brendan I. Koerner

The Skies Belong to Us: Love and Terror in the Golden Age of Hijacking
- First Edition
- Author: Brendan I. Koerner
- Language: English
- Publisher: Crown Publishing Group (USA)
- Publication date: 2013
- Publication place: United States
- Media type: Hardback
- ISBN: 978-0307886101
- Preceded by: Now the Hell Will Start

The Skies Belong to Us: Love and Terror in the Golden Age of Hijacking is a 2013 narrative nonfiction book by the American author Brendan I. Koerner. It is a history of the "golden age" of aircraft hijacking in the United States from the first incident in May 1961 through January 1973. Hijackings during this period took place as often as once a week, with about 160 incidents in total (most were to Cuba). The book looks at the causes of the epidemic, some of the more famous ones and follows in-depth the story of the longest-distance skyjacking in American history, involving Willie Roger Holder and Catherine Marie Kerkow, a young couple who took control of Western Airlines Flight 701 on June 2, 1972, and ended up flying across the Atlantic Ocean to Algeria. It finally examines what brought the hijacking craze to an end in 1973.

The book was favorably reviewed including in the New York Times Book Review, New York Times, Washington Post, Los Angeles Times, The National (Abu Dhabi), SFGate, and Bookforum.

== Awards and honors ==
It was an ALA Notable Books for Adults (2014), and was one of the New York Times 100 Notable Books of the Year (2013). It was longlisted for the Andrew Carnegie Medal for Excellence in Nonfiction (2014).
