= Lekhapani railway station =

Railway station in Assam, India

Lekhapani
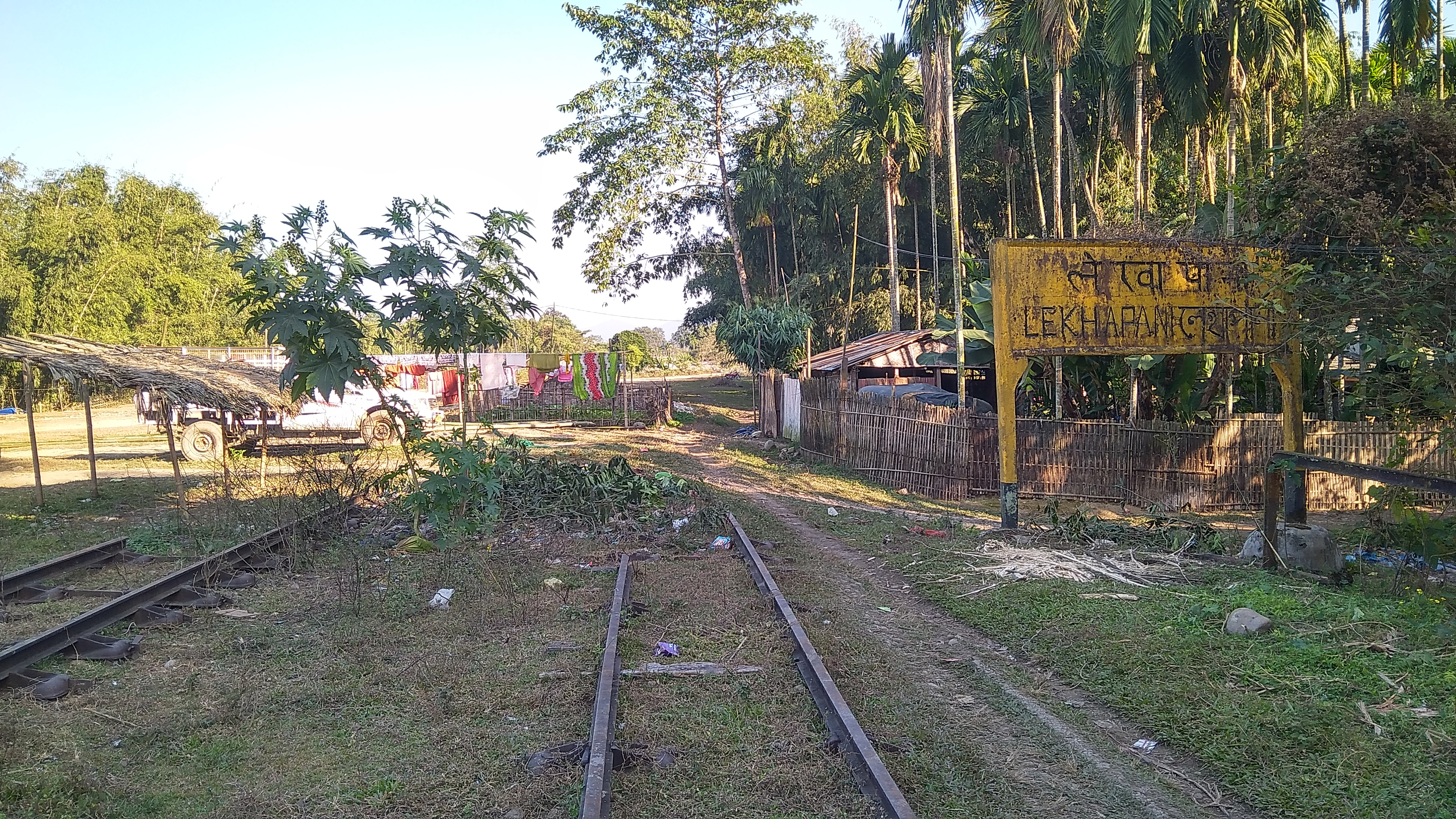

General information
- Location: Assam Trunk Road, Makum, District: Tinsukia, Assam; India
- Coordinates: 27°19′16″N 95°49′41″E
- Elevation: 130 metres (430 ft)
- System: Indian Railways station
- Owner: Indian Railways
- Operator: Northeast Frontier Railway
- Line: Lumding–Dibrugarh section

Construction
- Structure type: Standard on ground

Other information
- Status: Defunct
- Station code: LKPE

History
- Opened: 1890
- Closed: 1993
Location
- Location within Assam Location within India

Lekhapani is a railway station on the Lumding–Dibrugarh section. It is located in Tinsukia district in the Indian state of Assam.

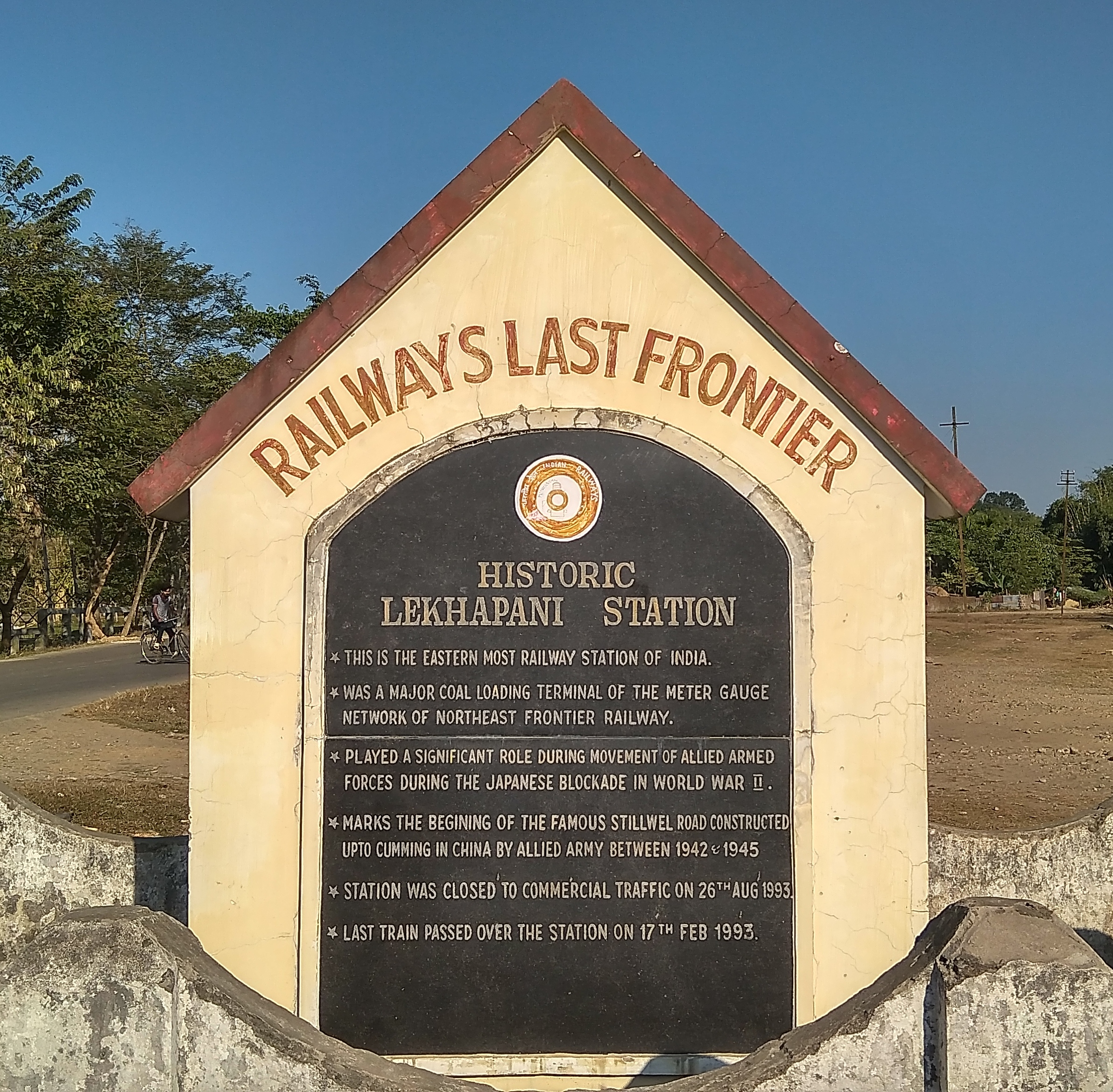
Display board of NF Railway

== History ==
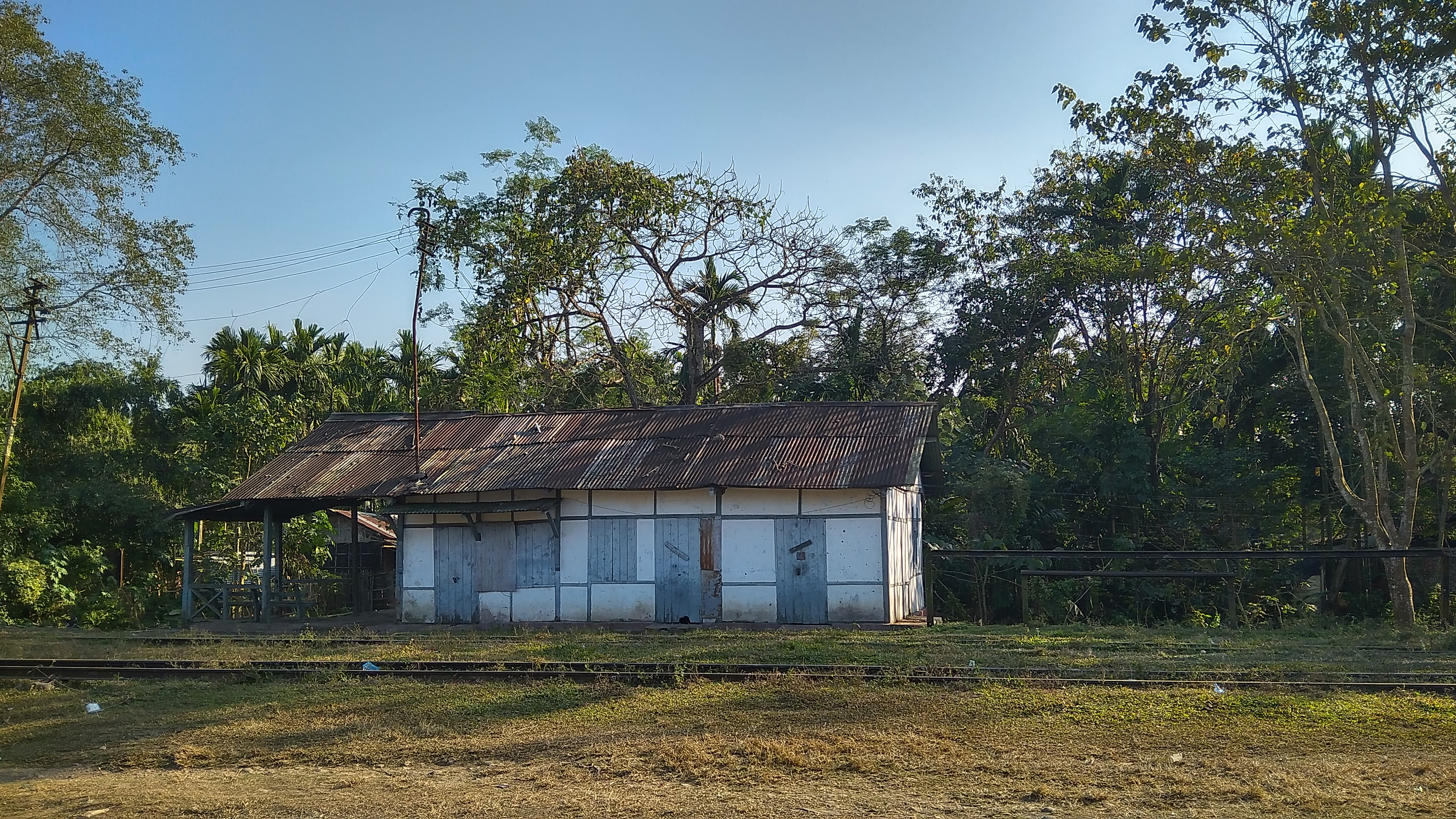
Abandoned Lekhapani railway station

Lekhapani railway station, opened around 1890, was a major coal-loading point for Tipong collieries. There is a display tablet at the station which says that the station was closed to commercial traffic in 1993 and the last train ran on the line in 1997. The railway station was restored in 2009.

Lekhapani used to be the easternmost railway station of Indian Railways. When gauge conversions took place around 1997, Ledo became the last and the easternmost station. The 5 ft 6 in (1,676 mm) broad gauge continued up to Tirap for railway sidings. Beyond that the remnants of the 1,000 mm (3 ft 3 3/8 in)-wide metre-gauge track to Lekhapani was visible (as of 2005).

== Stillwell Road ==
Lekhapani was the starting point of the Stillwell Road constructed by the Allied forces in 1942–45 through Burma to Kunming in China.

== New line surveys ==
Surveys are underway for 6 km (4 mi)-long line from Tirap to Lekhapani and 31 km (19 mi)-long line from Lekhapani to Kharsang in Arunachal Pradesh.
