= Tipong, Assam =

Coordinates: 27°18′N 95°51′E

Tipong also known as Tipong Colliery, is a small Town in Margherita Tehsil in Tinsukia District of north-eastern state Assam, India. It is located around 4 km away from nearest town Lekhapani, 9 km from away Tirap Gaon and 12 km away from nearest town Ledo. Tipong is connected by National Highway 38 to Makum. National Highway 153 which connects Ledo to Indo-Myanmar border (Stillwell Road) across Pangsau Pass through Lekhapani.

== Nearest Town and Villages ==
- Jagun
- Lekhapani
- Tirap Gaon
- Ledo, Assam
