= North Eastern Coalfields =

Unit of Coal India Limited headquartered in Margherita, Assam

North Eastern Coalfields is a unit of India's state-owned coal producer Coal India Limited, which has its headquarters in Margherita in Assam. The unit came into existence in 1975 after nationalization of coal mines in India. It took over the private mines operating in the Northeastern states of India and at present has mines operating in the states of Assam, Meghalaya, Nagaland and Arunachal Pradesh. At present, there are five working mines – three underground and two opencast mines.

== Collieries ==
- Tikak colliery
- Ledo OCP
- Tirap Colliery
- Tipong Colliery
