= List of highways numbered 312 =

The following highways are numbered 312:

== Canada ==
- Manitoba Provincial Road 312
- Nova Scotia Route 312
- Prince Edward Island Route 312
- Saskatchewan Highway 312

== China ==
- China National Highway 312

== Costa Rica ==
- National Route 312

== Cuba ==
- Road to Las Palacios (1–312)

== Japan ==
- Japan National Route 312

== United Kingdom ==
- A312 road, Hampton to Harrow

== United States ==
- U.S. Route 312 (former)
- Arkansas Highway 312
- Florida State Road 312
- Georgia State Route 312 (former)
- Indiana State Road 312
- Kentucky Route 312
- Louisiana Highway 312
- Maryland Route 312
- Minnesota State Highway 312 (former)
- New Mexico State Road 312
- New York:
  - New York State Route 312
  - New York State Route 312 (former)
  - County Route 312 (Albany County, New York)
  - County Route 312 (Wayne County, New York)
- Ohio State Route 312
- Pennsylvania Route 312 (former)
- Puerto Rico Highway 312
- Tennessee State Route 312
- Texas:
  - Texas State Highway 312 (proposed)
  - Texas State Highway Spur 312
- Farm to Market Road 312
- Utah State Route 312
- Virginia State Route 312
- Wisconsin Highway 312
- Wyoming Highway 312

Preceded by 311	Lists of highways 312	Succeeded by 313
