= Bahbari Gaon =

- city
- Location in Assam, India Bahbari Gaon (India)
- Coordinates: 26°11′51″N 92°57′36″E
- Country: India
- State: Assam
- District: Tinsukia

Population (2001)
  - Total: 6,159

Languages
  - Official: Assamese
- Time zone: UTC+5:30 (IST)
- Vehicle registration: AS

Bahbari Gaon is a census town in Tinsukia district in the state of Assam, India.

== Demographics ==
As of 2001 India census, Bahbari Gaon had a population of 6159. Males constitute 54% of the population and females 46%. Bahbari Gaon has an average literacy rate of 79%, higher than the national average of 59.5%; with 56% of the males and 44% of females literate. 9% of the population is under 6 years of age.
