= Dihing River =

River in India

Dihing River Burhi Dihing River
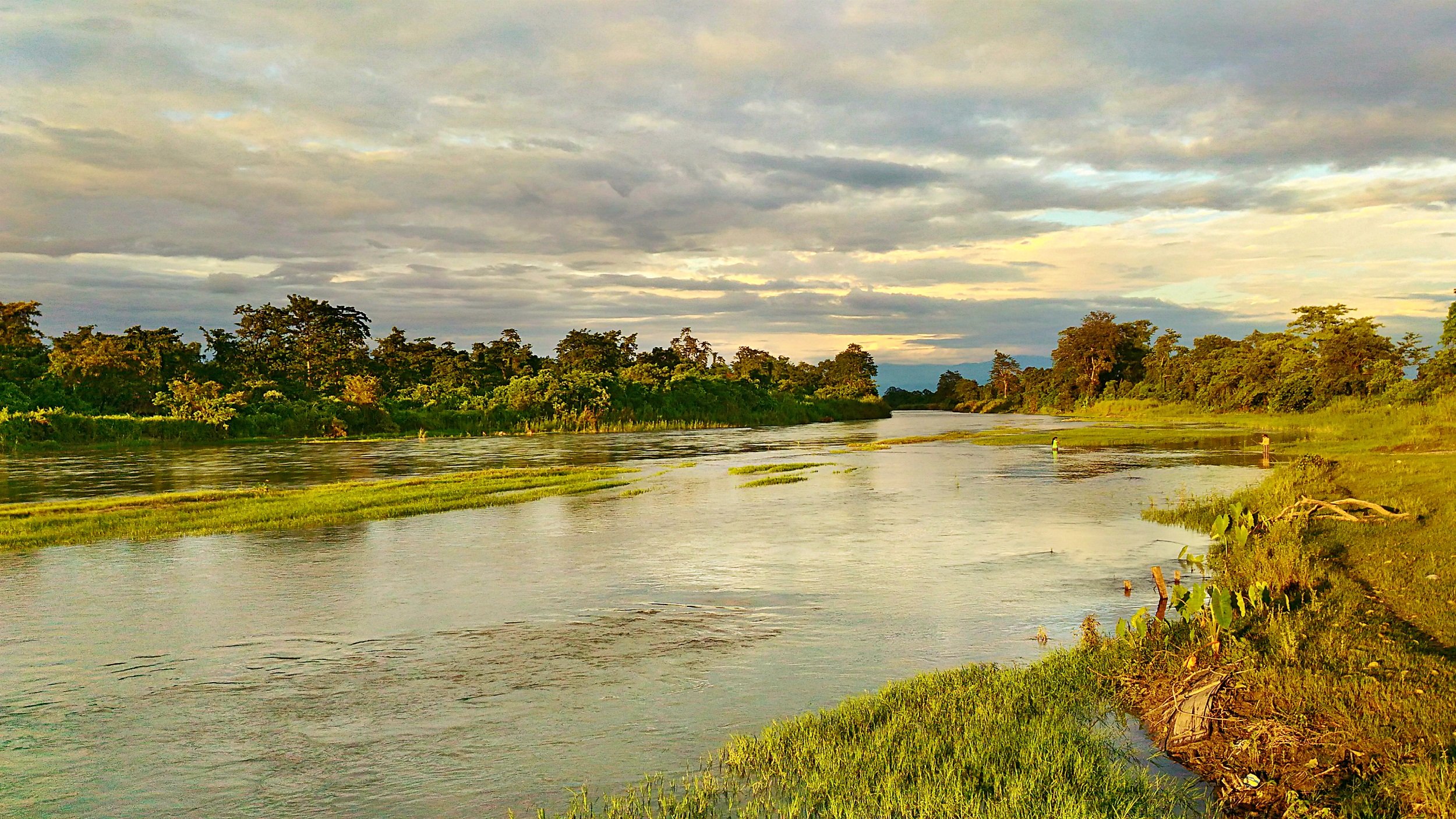
- Dihing river at Namsai, Arunachal Pradesh

- Location in Assam, India Dihing River (India)

Location
- Country: India (Arunachal Pradesh, Assam)

Physical characteristics
- Source: Patkai Hills
  - elevation: 2,375 m (7,792 ft)
- Mouth: Brahmaputra River
  - coordinates: 27°14′0″N 94°42′0″E
- Length: 380 km (240 mi)
- Basin size: 6,000 km^{2} (2,300 sq mi)

The Dihing or Burhi Dihing (Dihong = wide river) is a large tributary, about 380 kilometres (240 mi) long, of the Brahmaputra River in Upper Assam in northeastern India. The river originates at 2,375 metres (7,792 ft) above sea level in the Eastern Himalayas (the Patkai Hills) in Arunachal Pradesh and flows through Tinsukia and Dibrugarh Districts in Assam to its confluence with the Brahmaputra at Dihingmukh. Its watershed covers about 6,000 square kilometres (2,300 mi^{2}). The Dihing has created a number of oxbow lakes in the area.

Namdapha River is a tributary of the Dihing on its northern bank. Disang River is a tributary of the Dihing in its southern bank. The Jeypore-Dihing Rainforest, Namdapha National Park, numerous petroleum fields, wet-paddy fields, bamboo orchards and tea gardens provide a unique landscape along its course. Ledo, Margherita, Digboi, Duliajan and Naharkatia (Nahorkotiya) are the small towns in its valley. Dihing is one of the largest contributors to the Brahmaputra River. The plains of the Dihing Valley has a rich variety of flora and fauna. The Betel nuts are produced most in the areas of the Dihing Plains.

== History ==
According to historical as well as geographical records, the Dihing once flowed through entire Upper Assam and met the Brahmaputra at Mahuramukh in Bokakhat. According to Sarma(2007), about 250 years ago, the Dihing flowed westerly through Sibsagar district to meet the Brahmaputra at the extreme western point of Majuli island, which is now nearly 200 km west of present Dihingmukh, i.e. the outfall of the Burhi Dihing At that time the rivers Disang, Dikhou, Disai, Dhansiri were all tributaries to the Dihing. The river later dried out during the 17th century (as mentioned in Buranjis) and changed course to join the Brahmaputra at Dihingmukh.

Even before that, the river met the Brahmaputra further east. At that time the Dikhou River had an independent route and flowed as Kolong and joined the Brahmaputra at Kajalimukh in Nagaon district.

== Bridges and crossings ==
1. Rail bridge of chain age 41.480 kilometers situated at Kutuha Kachari Village of length 288.20 meter and width 6.30 meters.
2. RCC bridge of chain age 41.610 kilometers situated at Kutuha Kachari Village of length 236.30 meter and width 8.18 meters.
3. Rail bridge of chain age 54.586 kilometers situated at Kowar Kharoni Village of length 504.20 meter and width 8.50 meters.
4. Steel bridge of chain age 102.625 kilometers situated at Cheerika Beel Village of length 616.6 meter and width 3.13 meters.
5. RCC bridge of chain age 108.730 kilometers situated at Kowar Kharoni Village of length 273.93 meter and width 8.25 meters.
6. Rail bridge of chain age 109.136 kilometers situated at Kowar Kharoni Village of length 339.30 meter and width 5.89 meters.
