= China National Highway 313 =

Abandoned road in China

National Highway 313
- 313国道

Route information
- Length: 821 km (510 mi)

Major junctions
- From: Anxi (Guazhou)
- To: Ruoqiang, Xinjiang

Location
- Country: China

Highway system
- National Trunk Highway System; Primary; Auxiliary
| ← G312 | → G314 |

China National Highway 313 (G313) was a National Highway from Anxi (Guazhou), Gansu Province to Ruoqiang, Xinjiang. The total length was 821 km.

At present, the section between Guazhou and Dunhuang has become part of Gansu Provincial Highway 314 (S314), the section between Dunhuang and Aksai has become a part of China National Highway 215, the section between Aksai and Annanba Village has become part of Gansu Provincial Highway 313 (S313), and the section between Annanba Village and Ruoqiang has been abandoned.

== See also ==
- China National Highways
