= List of highways numbered 315 =

The following highways are numbered 315:

== Canada ==
- Manitoba Provincial Road 315
- New Brunswick Route 315
- Prince Edward Island Route 315
- Quebec Route 315

== China ==
- China National Highway 315

== Costa Rica ==
- National Route 315

== India ==
- National Highway 315 (India)

== Japan ==
- Japan National Route 315

== United States ==
- Interstate 315 (unsigned)
- Arkansas Highway 315
- Connecticut Route 315
- Florida State Road 315 (former)
- Georgia State Route 315
- Iowa Highway 315 (former)
- Kentucky Route 315
- Louisiana Highway 315
- Maryland Route 315
  - Maryland Route 315 (former)
- Mississippi Highway 315
- Montana Secondary Highway 315
- New Mexico State Road 315
- New York:
  - New York State Route 315
  - County Route 315 (Erie County, New York)
- Ohio State Route 315
  - Ohio State Route 315C (unsigned)
- Pennsylvania Route 315
- South Carolina Highway 315
- Tennessee State Route 315
- Texas:
  - Texas State Highway 315
  - Farm to Market Road 315
- Utah State Route 315
- Vermont Route 315
- Virginia State Route 315
- Wyoming Highway 315

Other areas:

- Puerto Rico Highway 315
- U.S. Virgin Islands Highway 315

Preceded by 314	Lists of highways 315	Succeeded by 316
