= Brendan I. Koerner =

American author (born 1974)

- Born: September 21, 1974 (age 52); Los Angeles, California, U.S.
- Education: Yale University (BA)
- Occupations: Editor, Columnist, Writer
- Children: 2
- Writing career
- Notable works: The Skies Belong to Us (2013); Piano Demon (2011); Now the Hell Will Start (2008)

Brendan Ian Koerner (born September 21, 1974) is an American author who has been a contributing editor and columnist for Wired magazine, The New York Times, Slate magazine, and others. His books include Now the Hell Will Start (2008) and The Skies Belong to Us (2013).

== Education and career ==
Koerner graduated from Yale University with a BA degree. In college, he contributed to campus humor magazine The Yale Record.

Koerner's first journalism job out of school was at U.S. News & World Report as a researcher and fact checker, he eventually became senior editor. Koerner left USN&WR to become a freelance writer in 2000, and was a regular contributor to The New Republic, Mother Jones, Harper's Magazine, Legal Affairs, Washington Monthly, and The Christian Science Monitor. He was also a columnist for Gizmodo.com, Slate.com, The New York Times Sunday Business section and the Village Voice (as "Mr. Roboto"). In addition, Koerner has served as a contributing editor to Wired. He has also published in magazines such as Details, Spin and Men's Journal. In 2006, Koerner edited the anthology The Best of Technology Writing which was positively reviewed in California Bookwatch and SciTech Book News.

His first solo authored full-length book, Now the Hell Will Start: One Soldier's Flight from the Greatest Manhunt of World War II, was published by Penguin Press in 2008. It is a non-fiction narrative investigating and recounting the story of Herman Perry, an African-American World War II soldier stationed in the China-Burma-India theatre of the war. Perry killed a white officer while helping construct the Ledo Road. He subsequently retreated into the Indo-Burmese wilderness and joined a tribe of the headhunting Nagas. The book was favorably reviewed. In 2009, Spike Lee optioned the film rights and Lee commissioned Koerner to write a draft of the screenplay.

In 2011, Koerner published Piano Demon: The Globetrotting, Gin-Soaked, Too-Short Life of Teddy Weatherford, the Chicago Jazzman Who Conquered Asia, it is about the jazz musician Teddy Weatherford.

Koerner's third book, The Skies Belong to Us: Love and Terror in the Golden Age of Hijacking (2013) is a history of the "golden age" of skyjacking in the United States from the first incident in May 1961 through January 1973, when there were as many as one skyjacking a week or about 159 in total. The book looks at the causes of the epidemic, some of the more famous ones and follows in-depth the story of the longest-distance skyjacking in American history, involving Willie Roger Holder and Catherine Marie Kerkow, a young couple who took control of Western Airlines Flight 701 on June 2, 1972. The book was favorably reviewed including in The New York Times Book Review, The New York Times, The Washington Post, Los Angeles Times, The National (Abu Dhabi), SFGate, and Bookforum.

== Awards and honors ==
Koerner is a fellow at the New America Foundation. In 2002, the Columbia Journalism Review named him one of its "Ten Young Writers on the Rise". In 2010, the New Haven Review included him in its list of "20 Non-fiction Writers Under 40". In 2003, he won a National Headliner Award for feature writing. His work has been anthologized in Best American Science Writing (2003, "Disorders Made to Order") and Best American Science and Nature Writing (2003, "Embryo Police").

== Personal life ==
Brendan's father gave him the middle name Ian because he was a fan of Ian Fleming's James Bond movies. Brendan is married, with a son and a daughter.

== Bibliography ==
- Koerner, Brendan I. (2008). Now the hell will start : one soldier's flight from the greatest manhunt of World War II. New York: Penguin Press.
- Piano Demon: The Globetrotting, Gin-Soaked, Too-Short Life of Teddy Weatherford, the Chicago Jazzman Who Conquered Asia (2011)
- The Skies Belong to Us: Love and Terror in the Golden Age of Hijacking (2013)
- — (November 2021). "Blood and lies". Wired. 29.11: 54–67.
