= Now the Hell Will Start =

2008 book by Brendan I. Koerner

Now the Hell Will Start: One Soldier's Flight from the Greatest Manhunt of World War II
- First Edition (English)
- Author: Brendan I. Koerner
- Language: English
- Genre: World War II
- Publisher: Penguin Press (USA)
- Publication date: 2008
- Publication place: United States
- Media type: Hardback
- ISBN: 1-59420-173-0
- OCLC: 175289974
- Dewey Decimal: 940.54/8 22
- LC Class: D810.N4 P4756 2008
- Followed by: The Skies Belong to Us

Now the Hell Will Start: One Soldier's Flight from the Greatest Manhunt of World War II (2008) is a narrative nonfiction history book by United States author Brendan I. Koerner.

It investigates and recounts the story of Herman Perry, an African-American World War II soldier assigned to the China-Burma-India theatre of the war. Perry killed a white officer while helping construct the Ledo Road. He subsequently retreated into the Indo-Burmese wilderness and joined a tribe of the headhunting Nagas, successfully joining one village and marrying the fourteen-year-old daughter of one of the tribe members.

It also relates some of the history of the CBI theatre as it pertains to Herman Perry, as well as explores the injustices of the Jim Crow mentality and policies carried out by the military during World War II.

In February 2009, American director Spike Lee purchased the film rights to the book.
