= Patkai =

Mountain range in India/Myanmar

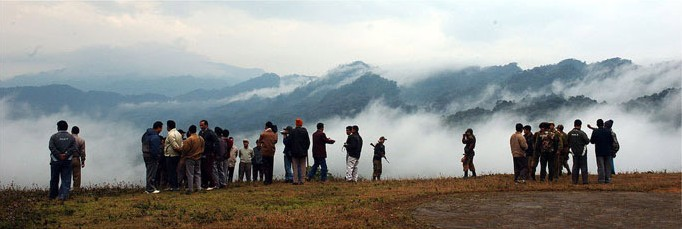
- Patkai hill summits seen from the Pangsau Pass

Highest point
- Peak: Mount Saramati
- Elevation: 3,826 m (12,552 ft)
- Coordinates: 25°44′24″N 95°2′15″E

Geography
- Location within Myanmar Location within India
- Countries: India and Myanmar
- Range coordinates: 27°0′N 96°0′E
- Parent range: Purvanchal Range

The Pat-kai (/pʌtˈkaɪ/) or Patkai Bum (Burmese: Patkaing Taungdan) are a series of mountains on the Indo-Myanmar border falling in the northeastern Indian states of Arunachal Pradesh, Nagaland and Upper Burma region of Myanmar. In Tai-Ahom language, Pat means to cut and Kai means chicken.

== Geography ==
The Patkai mountains, part of the Purvanchal Range, are not as rugged as the Himalayas and the peaks are much lower. Features of the range include conical peaks, steep slopes and deep valleys.

Three mountain ranges come under the Patkai: the Patkai-Bum, the Garo-Khasi-Jaintia hills and the Lushai Hills. The Garo-Khasi range is in the Indian state of Meghalaya. Mawsynram and Cherrapunji, on the windward side of these mountains are the world's wettest places, having the highest annual rainfall.

The climate ranges from temperate to alpine due to difference in altitude.

The Pangsau Pass offers the most important route through the Patkai. The Ledo Road was built through Pangsau Pass as a strategic supply road during World War II to link India with the Burma Road and finally onto China.

In World War II, the Patkai Range was considered a part of The Hump by the Allied Forces.

== See also ==
- Arakan Mountains
- List of ultras of Southeast Asia
- Dehing Patkai Festival
