= Jairampur =

- city
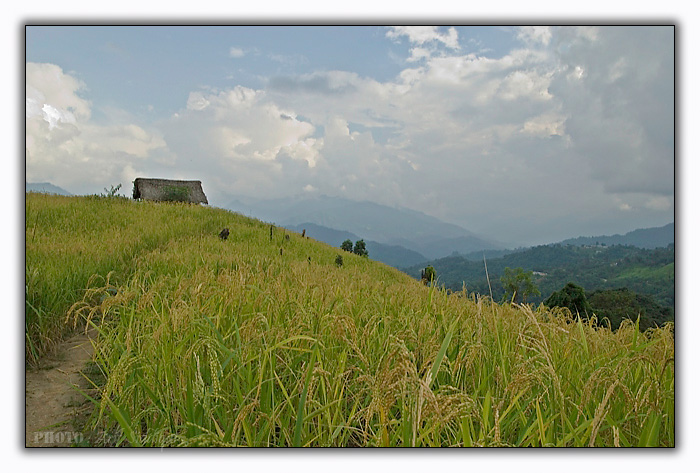

- Location in Arunachal Pradesh, India Jairampur (India)
- Coordinates: 27°21′4″N 96°0′57″E
- Country: India
- State: Arunachal Pradesh
- District: Changlang
- Elevation: 200 m (660 ft)

Population (2001)
  - Total: 5,918

Languages
  - Official: English
- Time zone: UTC+5:30 (IST)
- PIN: 792121
- ISO 3166 code: IN-AR
- Vehicle registration: AR 12
- Climate: Cwa

Jairampur is a census town in Changlang district in the Indian state of Arunachal Pradesh.

== Demographics ==
Jairampur is an ADC HQ of Changlang district (situated in the southeastern part of Arunachal Pradesh, North East India). A small hilly town along the Indo-Myanmar border and Namchik basin, it is covered with evergreen tropical rain forest.

At the 2001 India census, Jairampur had a population of 5918. Males constitute 57% of the population and females 43%. Jairampur has an average literacy rate of 71%, lower than the national average of 74.5% (2011 census): male literacy is 77%, and female literacy is 64%. In Jairampur, 15% of the population is under 6 years of age.

== People ==
The Tangsas are dominant tribe of these four Circles under Jairampur(Nampong, Manmao, Rima-Putok and Jairampur) which is one of the major tribe of Arunachal Pradesh. There are different sub tribes within the Tangsa, namely Tikhak, Muklom, Havi, Longchang, Mossang, Jugli, Kimsing, Ronrang, Mungrey, Longphi, Longri, Ponthai, Sangwal, Yongkuk, Sakieng, Thamphang etc. They are of Mongoloid descent. According to the legends, The Tangsas originated in a hill called Masoi Sinarupam, (Myanmar). They migrated to India in the 1740s from the north of Myanmar and migrated to the present habitat only in the early 18th century. Traditionally, they are believer of Bon Faith which is portrayed by spirit and ceremonial animal slaughters. Nonetheless over the years many have converted to Buddhism and Christianity. The Tangsas are laborious and peace-loving community. They are experts in handicrafts particularly in woodcarving. The major populations of the Tangsa are agriculturist by occupation. Lifestyle is uncomplicated. Survival is simple. Their warm smiles compel to forget the freezing temperature of January and the hospitality for the guest are the best in the world
