= Makum =

Town in Assam, India

- Town
- Location in Assam, India Makum (India)
- Coordinates: 27.5°N 95.45°E
- Country: India
- State: Assam
- District: Tinsukia

Government
  - Body: Makum Municipality Board
- Elevation: 122 m (400 ft)

Population (2001)
  - Total: 15,058

Languages
  - Official: Assamese
- Time zone: UTC+5:30 (IST)
- PIN: 786170
- Telephone code: Police Station -03742345557
- ISO 3166 code: IN-AS
- Vehicle registration: AS

Makum (IPA: mɑːkəm) is a town and a town area committee in Tinsukia district in the Indian state of Assam. It should not be mistaken for Makum Pathar (the place near Digboi where, crude oil was first struck in Asia). It is the meeting point of three premier towns of upper Assam namely Tinsukia Digboi and Doomdooma. The National Highway-37 and National Highway-38 meet at Makum. Makum railway station is the easternmost railway junction of the Indian Railways. The rail line became operational on 16 July 1883.

It falls under the Dibrugarh (Lok Sabha constituency) and under the Makum Assembly constituency.

== Location ==
It is located around 7 km east of Tinsukia town. It is well connected with all the major surrounding places by roads and railways. Passenger auto rickshaws for around 16 hours a day from Makum to Tinsukia and from Makum to Doomdooma. The Tata Magic service from Doomdooma to Tinsukia also benefits Makum.

== Geography ==
Makum is located at 27.5°N 95.45°E. It has an average elevation of 122 metres (400 feet).

== Demographics ==
As of 2011 India census, Makum had a population of 16,923. Males constitute 53% of the population and females 47%. Makum has an average literacy rate of 68%, higher than the national average of 59.5%: male literacy is 73%, and female literacy is 62%. In Makum, 13% of the population is under 6 years of age.

=== Language ===
Languages spoken in Makum (2011)
1. Bengali (29.0%)
2. Assamese (27.1%)
3. Hindi (14.2%)
4. Sadri (13.2%)
5. others (16.4%)

Bengali is the most spoken language at 4,909 speakers, followed by Assamese at 4,594, Hindi is spoken by 2,396 people and Adivasi at 2,238.

== Economy ==
Makum is basically an industrial town. During the early 1920 during the British India, Bir Singh and Company was a pioneer in industrial acumen of engineering sciences. The industrial house catered to the Upper Assam region in tea machinery manufacturing and installation at a production base. The CTC (Chrush-Tear-Curl) tea machinery was invented and manufactured on a production line.

There were a large number of plywood factories in Makum, but now, most of these have been closed down. There are also a large number of tea factories in Makum. Other industries include the flour industry, candle industry, spices grinding industry, etc. There is also a timber treating plant in Makum. There are a large number of small tea growers in and around the town who supply their produce to these factories. However most of the people of Makum make their livelihood from services of different kinds and small businesses.

== Education ==
There are a large number of schools located in Makum, like Ganga Bishan Chowkhani Higher Secondary School, Gopalkrishna Balika Vidyalaya, Balya Bhawan, Nagaon High School, Zenith Pathsala, Railway School etc. A college, (Makum College) was established in makum in 1997, which provides higher secondary and degree education in arts and commerce. The only Forest Guards' training school of Assam is situated at this town. Also there are several private computer education centre like Academy of Information Technology(AIT), Digitech, Orange IT Solutions etc. and Mahadev Internet cafe & Services to improve computer literacy in the town. There is also govt certified computer education centre situated approximately 2 km away from town and in the premises of Office of the Block Development Officer, Hapjan Development Block which is providing computer education at a very low cost. In 2024, Assam Government started the 13th Medical College of Assam, Tinsukia Medical College and Hospital in Makum giving a new horizon to the region's healthcare system.

== Chinatown ==
Makum once had a thriving community of Chinese who had settled in the area in the 1830s. The Chinatown in Makam was closed in 1962 following the outbreak of the Sino-Indian War – as Assam is in close proximity to India-China border, there were heightened security concerns. The Chinatown (now known as Chinapatty) is now inhabited by local population but many of the Chinese house structures left behind by the original Chinese inhabitants still remain. The Assamese novel "Makam" (মাকাম) written by award-winning writer Rita Chowdhury narrates the ordeals faced by the Chinese community of Makum following the outbreak of the war, such as their relocation to detention camps in Rajasthan and the deportation of some to China. The main character of the novel is a resident of Chinapatty.

The annual Durga Puja celebrations organised by the Shree Shree Durga Puja Committee in Chinapatty since 1982 is considered a hallmark example of religious harmony because people from all religions participate in the organisation and celebration of the festival without any differentiation based on religious affiliation.
