= Tinsukia district =

District of Assam, India

- District of Assam
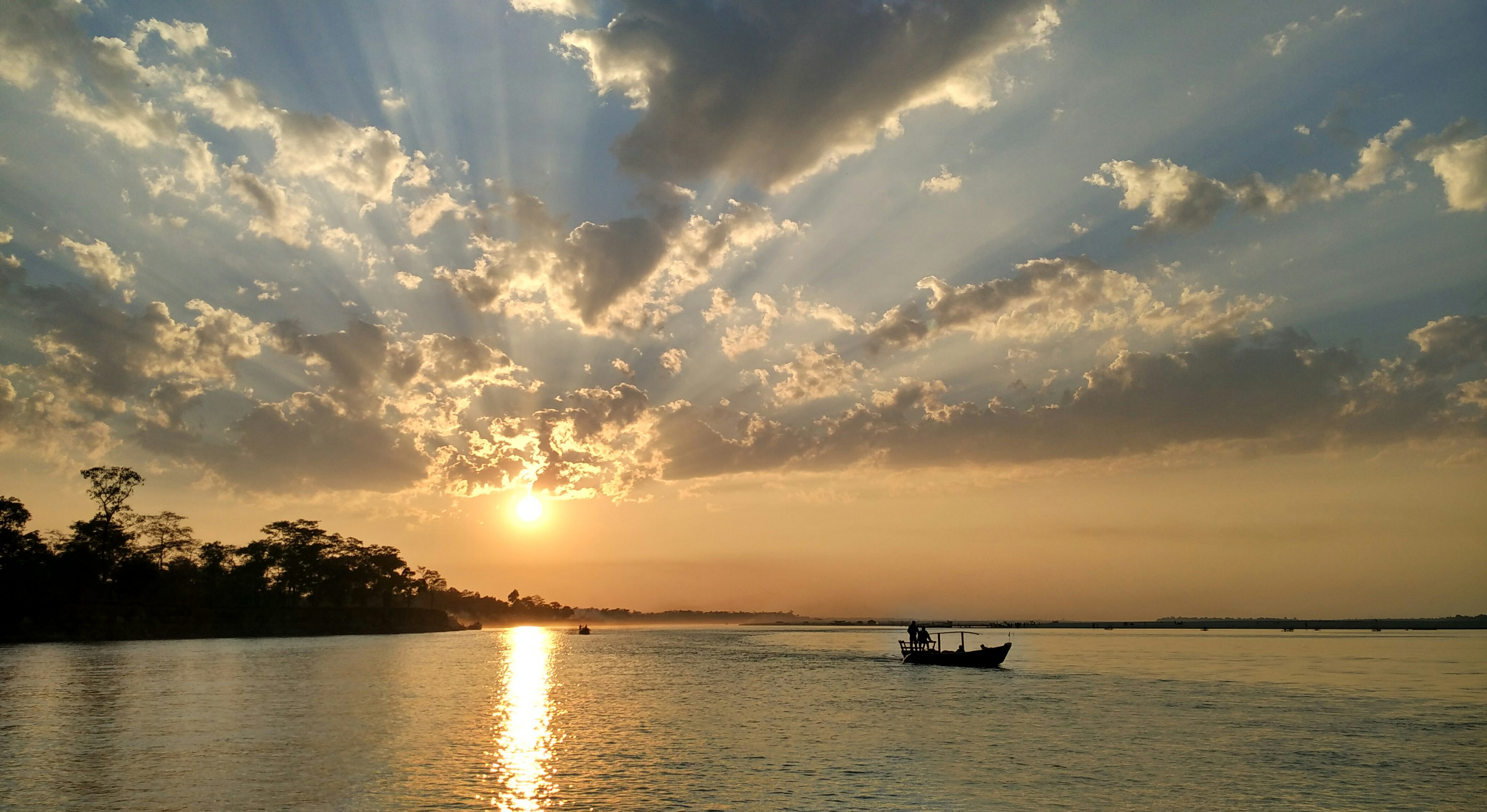
- Brahmaputra flowing through Dibru-Saikhowa National Park

- Location in Assam
- Interactive map of Tinsukia district
- Coordinates: 27°36′N 95°36′E
- Country: India
- State: Assam
- Division: Upper Assam
- Established: 1 October 1989
- Headquarter: Tinsukia
- Tehsils: Tinsukia; Sadiya; Margherita; Doomdooma

Government
  - Member of Parliament: Rameswar Teli (BJP) – Dibrugarh; Pradan Baruah (BJP) – Lakhimpur
  - Deputy Commissioner: Swapneel Paul (IAS)
  - Superintendent of Police: Gaurav Abhijit Dilip (IPS)

Area
  - Total: 3,790 km^{2} (1,460 sq mi)
  - Urban: 61.496 km^{2} (23.744 sq mi)
  - Rural: 3,728.504 km^{2} (1,439.583 sq mi)

Population (2011)
  - Total: 1,327,929
  - Density: 350/km^{2} (907/sq mi)
  - Urban: 264,743 (19.94%)
  - Rural: 1,063,186 (80.06%)

Demographics
  - Literacy: 70.92%
  - Sex ratio: 948 ♀/1000 ♂
  - Scheduled Castes: 2.84% (37,688)
  - Scheduled Tribes: 6.18% (82,066)

Language
  - Official: Assamese, English
- Time zone: UTC+05:30 (IST)
- Major highways: NH 37, NH 38, NH 153
- Website: tinsukia.assam.gov.in

Tinsukia district is one of the 34 administrative districts in the state of Assam, India. The district headquarters is located at Tinsukia city. The district occupies an area of 3790 km^{2}.

== History ==
The area of the present district was an integral part of the Chutia kingdom during the medieval period. After the defeat of the Chutias, following the Chutia-Ahom conflicts, the Ahoms appointed Phrasengmung Borgohain as the Sadiya-Khowa Gohain to rule the region.

Later, the Matak kingdom rose in its place after the Moamoria rebellion. The older name of Tinsukia city was Bengmara. It was later made the capital of the Motok Kingdom when a member of the former Chutia royal family named Sarbananada Singha established his capital at Rangagarh situated in the bank of river Guijan. In 1791 AD, he transferred his capital to the city of Bengmara. Bengmara was built by King Sarbananda Singha with the help of his Minister, Gopinath Barbaruah (alias Godha). The city was built in the middle of the present city of Tinsukia. It was declared the 23rd district of Assam on 1 October 1989 when it was split from Dibrugarh.

Several tanks were dug in the days of Sarbananda Singha viz. Chauldhuwa Pukhuri, Kadamoni pukhuri, Da Dharua Pukhuri, Mahdhuwa Pukhuri, Bator Pukhuri, Logoni Pukhuri, Na-Pukhuri, Devi Pukhuri, Kumbhi Pukhuri, and Rupahi Pukhuri. Apart from these ponds, there are many ancient roads constructed in different parts of the Muttack territory. Godha-Borbaruah road, Rangagarah road, Rajgor road, and Hatiali road were main roads within the territory.

In 1823, the British first discovered tea plants in Sadiya and the first tea plantation was started in Chabua near Tinsukia. The name Chabua comes from "Chah-Buwa"/tea plantation. In 1882, the Dibru–Sadiya Railway was opened to traffic by the Assam Railway & Trading Company, centred on Tinsukia, and a turning point in the economic development of north-east India.

== Geography ==
=== Flora and fauna ===
In 1999 Tinsukia district became home to Dibru-Saikhowa National Park, which has an area of 340 km^{2} (131.3 mi^{2}). It shares the park with Dibrugarh district.

== Notable Towns ==
- Digboi
- Doomdooma
- Jagun
- Kakopathar
- Ledo Town
- Makum
- Margherita
- Sadiya
- Tinsukia
- Bahbari Gaon

== Economy ==
Tinsukia is an industrial district of Assam. The Oldest oil refinery in India is situated at Digboi and places like Margherita and Ledo are famous for open cast coal mining. It is one of the most important tea-growing and processing districts in the country. Thereby, Tinsukia district has a long history of extractive industries spanning tea, coal, oil, timber, and plywood. The timber and plywood industries was halted by the Supreme Court of India when it imposed a blanket ban in 1996. Sociologist Sanjay Barbora and Geologist Sarat Phukan who grew up in eastern Assam assert,

Three crucial industrial activities – tea plantations, oil drilling sites, and collieries – that epitomised 19th and 20th century colonialism, are layered into this energised landscape.

Tinsukia is one of the premier commercial centres in Assam. It is an industrial district, yet it produces a sizeable amount of tea, oranges, ginger, other citrus fruits and paddy (rice). The district also has a cosmetic plant of Hindustan Unilever (HUL).

== Infrastructure ==
=== Transport ===
Tinsukia is well connected by airway, national highway and railway. It is 532 km by road from Dispur, the state capital of Assam. The nearest airport is Dibrugarh Airport which is about 40 km from Tinsukia with daily connection from Delhi/Guwahati and Kolkata. The New Tinsukia railway station connects Tinsukia with the rest of the country.

=== Health care Institutions ===
==== Public hospitals ====
- Civil Hospital
- ESIS Hospital

==== Private hospitals ====
- City Hospital & Research Center
- Deys Nursing Home
- Borthakur Nursing Home
- RC Agarwal Memorial Hospital
- Saint Lukes Hospital
- Jeewan Jyoti Nursing Home
- Swastik Nursing Home
- Pinewood Hospital
- Biroja Hospital
- Lifeline Hospital

== Demographics ==
Historical population
Year	Pop.	±%
1901	121,052	—
1911	152,876	+26.3%
1921	204,964	+34.1%
1931	253,982	+23.9%
1941	311,626	+22.7%
1951	367,536	+17.9%
1961	499,568	+35.9%
1971	654,510	+31.0%
1991	962,298	+47.0%
2001	1,150,062	+19.5%
2011	1,327,929	+15.5%
Source: Census of India

According to the 2011 census Tinsukia district has a population of 1,327,929, roughly equal to the nation of Mauritius or 4.22 percent of the total population of Assam. This gives it a ranking of 371st in India (out of a total of 640). The district has a population density of 347 inhabitants per square kilometre (900/sq mi). Its population growth rate over the decade 2001-2011 was 14.51%. Tinsukia has a sex ratio of 948 females for every 1000 males, and a literacy rate of 70.92%. 19.94% of the population lives in urban areas. Scheduled Castes and Tribes make up 2.84% and 6.18% of the population respectively.

=== Religion ===
Religions in Tinsukia district (2011)
Religion	Percent
Hinduism	88.96%
Christianity	5.79%
Islam	3.64%
Buddhism	1.22%
Other or not stated	0.39%

Hindus were 1,181,347 (88.96%), Christians 76,877 (5.79%), Muslims 48,373 (3.64%) as of 2011.

=== Languages ===
Languages of Tinsukia district (2011)
1. Assamese (47.8%)
2. Sadri (14.1%)
3. Bengali (10.2%)
4. Hindi (8.54%)
5. Nepali (7.51%)
6. Bhojpuri (2.30%)
7. Odia (2.11%)
8. Mising (1.46%)
9. Others (5.96%)

Tinisukia is a multi cultural district. According to the 2011 census, 47.81% of the population spoke Assamese, 14.10% Sadri, 10.21% Bengali, 8.54% Hindi, 7.51% Nepali, 2.3% Bhojpuri, 2.11% Odia and 1.46% Mising as their first language. Several other languages are spoken in Tinsukia district such as Khamti and Tai Phake.

== Culture ==
- Bihu
- Durga Puja
- Kali Puja
- Karam
- Tusu Festival
- Chhath Puja
- Ali Ai Ligang

== Tourism ==
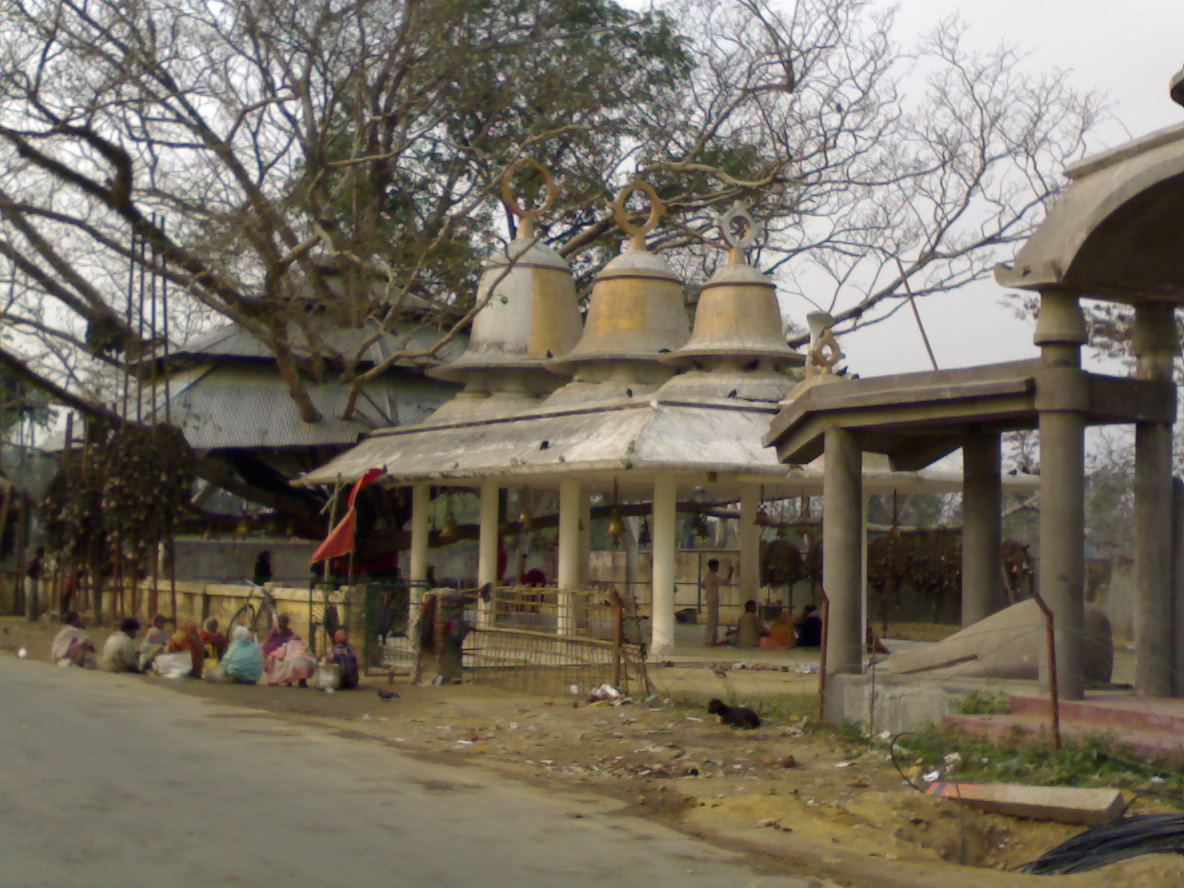
Tilinga Mondir at Tinisukia

Dibru Saikhowa National Park is famous for birds and is a biodiversity hotspot with over 350 species of avifauna providing habitat for globally threatened species. It is a safe haven for white-winged wood duck and many migratory birds. There are also feral horses.

Dehing Patkai Wildlife Sanctuary is one of the last remaining lowland tropical wet evergreen forests of Assam. It spreads over an area of 300 km^{2}. in the southern and eastern parts of the district. It is home to various types of wildlife like the hoolock gibbon, pig-tailed macaque, slow loris, tiger, elephant, clouded leopard, and hornbill.

=== Places of interest ===
- Digboi

Digboi boasts of two modern wonders of the world – a hundred-year-old oil field still producing and the world's oldest operating oil refinery. Tucked amid blue hills and undulating plains carpeted with emerald green tea plantations, Digboi still retains its colonial ambiance. It's simply breathtaking to have a bird's eye view of Digboi from the famous Ridge Hill point. On clear days, one can also see the snow-covered mountains of the eastern Himalayas.

- National Oil Park

Digboi also has an oil museum and a wildlife sanctuary of unsurpassed beauty. Going down the hill, visitors will come across oil derricks of various types and other devices still declaring the glory and marvel of the now outdated innovations of the last forties. If one comes down from the hill on the other side, one will have the greatest sight of his lifetime. One may also bump across a herd of elephants or a Royal Bengal Tiger, besides some rare species of birds.

- War Cemetery

The most dramatic event in Digboi's history took place during the World War II when the belligerent Japanese came close to within three days marching distance of Digboi. These images come back as one kneels at the headstones at the Digboi War Cemetery.

- Margherita

The centre of tea gardens, plywood factories, and coal mines, with many picnic spots dotting the sandy banks of the River Dihing. Cool, misty and away from the mainland, breathing in the aroma of fresh tea leaves is an experience, both rare and heartwarming. The tea gardens here are perhaps the best in the world.

- Sports

The 18-hole golf course developed by the Scottish pioneers in their immutable style. In fact, Digboi can almost be called a Golfing Resort with as many as eight golf courses within close proximity, each with its own individual character and challenges.

== See also ==
- Moran Autonomous Council
