= Ledo, Assam =

Ledo Lidu
- Semi-Rural
- Ledo
- Location in Assam, India Ledo (India)
- Coordinates: 27°18′0″N 95°44′0″E
- Country: Margherita India
- State: Assam
- District: Tinsukia

Government
  - Type: Panchayat Raj under State Government
  - Body: Gaon Panchayat of Ledo
- Elevation: 150 m (490 ft)

Population (2011)
  - Total: 6,540

Languages
  - Hindi, Bengali, etc.: Assamese
- Time zone: UTC+5:30 (IST)
- PIN: [786182]
- ISO 3166 code: IN-AS
- Vehicle registration: AS
- Coastline: 0 kilometres (0 mi)
- Nearest city: Margherita
- Avg. summer temperature: 30 °C (86 °F)
- Avg. winter temperature: 6 °C (43 °F)

Ledo is a small town in Tinsukia district, Assam, India. As of 2005, the Ledo railway station is the easternmost broad gauge railway station in India. The town is also the starting point of Ledo Road, also known as Stilwell Road, a highway built during World War II for use by American and British troops as a military supply route to China through Myanmar (Burma)

The first coal mine in Assam was started near Ledo in 1882 when the erstwhile Assam Railway & Trading Company was laying a metre gauge railway line in that region.And Ledo is famous for its high quality good coal

== Nearest Town and Villages ==
- Tirap Gaon
- Lekhapani
- Margherita
- Tipong

== Railway Station ==
Ledo Railway Station (station code: LEDO) is located in Tinsukia district, Assam, India. As of 2005, it holds the distinction of being the easternmost broad gauge railway station in India.The Dibrugarh Airport (approximately 78 km away). It is located NH 38 (Stillwell Rd), Ledo, Samukjan, District: Tinsukia, Assam, India. Ledo is also the starting point of the Ledo Road, also known as the Stilwell Road, which was built during World War II as a military supply route to China through Myanmar (Burma). The station falls under the administrative control of the Tinsukia Division of the Northeast Frontier Railway zone. It is a last railway station on the Tinsukia–Ledo line in Assam, India. It holds historical significance as the easternmost broad gauge station in the country. Although it doesn’t have pass through station.

== Originating trains ==
Some of the major trains that start their journey at Ledo include:

- LEDO - RANGIYA Express (Unreserved) (Train No. 15968)
- LEDO - Murkongselek DEMU Express Special (Unreserved) (Train No. 07902)
- Guwahati–Ledo Intercity Express
