= 47th Moscow International Film Festival =

Film festival

- Location: Moscow
- Founded: 1959
- Awards: Golden Saint George
- Festival date: 17–24 April 2025
- Website: http://www.moscowfilmfestival.ru
- 48th 46th

The 47th Moscow International Film Festival was held from 17 to 24 April 2025.

Russian film director Nikita Mikhalkov was the president of the festival. Spanish film director Lluís Miñarro was head of the main jury. His Name Was Not Listed was the opening film and What We Wanted to Be was the closing film. On April 17, 2025, the opening ceremony took place at the Rossiya Theatre, hosted by actor Aleksei Guskov. On April 24, the closing ceremony also took place at the Rossiya Theatre. The Golden Saint George for Best Film was awarded to the Indian film The Elysian Field directed by Pradip Kurbah.

== Jury ==
Main Competition

- Lluís Miñarro, film producer & writer (Spain) – President of the Jury
- Bushra, film actress (Egypt & UK)
- Cornel Gheorghiță, film director & screenwriter (Romania)
- Aleksey German Jr., film director & screenwriter (Russia)
- John Robinson, film actor (USA)
- Maryana Spivak, film actress (Russia)

Documentary Competition

- Peter Kuznick, professor, writer and public activist (USA) – President of the Jury
- Bruno Jorge, film director, cinematographer and editor (Brazil)
- Irina Uralskaya, film cinematographer and director (Russia)

Short film competition

- Erkan Kolçak Köstendil, film actor, director and writer (Turkey) - President of the Jury
- Fabio Massa, film actor (Italy)
- Yulia Khlynina, film actress (Russia)

Russian Premiere competition

- Vladimir Grammatikov, film actor, director and writer (Russia) - President of the Jury
- Anna Matison, film director, writer and playwright (Russia)
- Sergey Titinkov, film producer, media manager, chief film producer of Channel One (Russia)

NETPAC Jury

- Premendra Mazumder, film critic, author and festival organizer (India) - President of the Jury
- Andronika Martonova, film scholar, critic and professor (Bulgaria)
- Sardana Savvina, film producer, researcher, Master of Arts (Russia)

Russian Film Critics Jury

- Maria Bezenkova
- Veronika Sarkisova
- Temina Tuaeva
- Yulia Ustyugova
- Alexander Khort

== Films in competition ==
Main Competition

English title	Original title	Director(s)	Production country
The Negotiator	Il Nibbio	Alessandro Tonda	Italy, Belgium
The Bread Season	Demsala Nan	Anvar Hassanpour, Emeer Hassanpour	USA, Turkey
Two People in One Life and a Dog	Двое в одной жизни, не считая собаки	Andrey Zaytsev	Russia
When We Bloom Again	목화솜 피는 날	Shin Kyung-soo	South Korea
For Your Sake	Por tu bien	Axel Monsú	Argentina
A House on Fire	Casa en flames	Dani de la Orden	Spain
Evacuation	Эвакуация	Farkhat Sharipov	Kazakhstan
Wisdom of the Whale	Balinanin Bilgisi	Önder Şengül	Turkey
Lateral Thinking	Pensamiento Lateral	Mariano Hueter	Argentina
The Planet	Планета	Mikhail Arkhipov	Russia
Family Happiness	Семейное счастье	Stacy Tolstoy	Russia
Beyond the Mast	মাস্তুল	Mohammad Nuruzzaman	Bangladesh, Netherlands, Germany
The Elysian Field	Ha Lyngkha Bneng	Pradip Kurbah	India

Documentary Competition

English title	Original title	Director(s)	Production country
Marino and the Authentics	Marino y los auténticos	Cristóbal Jasso	Mexico
I Don't Wanna Sit in My Cemetery	Baghjan	Jaicheng Jai Dohutia	India, Germany
The Winter Road	Зимник	Yuri Dorokhin	Russia
Ms. Hu's Garden	胡阿姨的花园	Pan Zhiqi	China
Trick	شگرد	Jafar Sadeghi	Iran
Sinara	Синара	Natalia Lobko	Russia
Reverse	Реверс	Ivan Tverdovskiy	Russia
The Days with Her	Los días con ella	Matías Scarvaci	Argentina

Short Film Competition

English title	Original title	Director(s)	Production country
Uncle	Дяденька	Ivan Vetoshkin	Russia
LIME	Cal	Santiago Dulce	Argentina
Who Let the Wild Donkey Go Free?	Кто пустил дикого осла на свободу?	Nikita Lokhmatov	Russia
Minor Chronicle	Crónica menor	Francisco Usiel	Mexico
Incompatible		Judit Vilarrasa	Spain
New Address	Noya Thikana	Sumsuddin Ahmed Shiblu	Bangladesh
Widmung	献呈	Kei Miyaji	Japan
After Father	پس از پدر	Noushin Meraji	Iran
About the Cow	Про корову	Anton Simukhin, Nikolay Alekseev	Russia
Bumblebee	Abellón	Fon Cortizo	Spain
Tango	Танго	Fedor Malyshev	Russia
Born to Fly	우화하길	Lee Byoung-don	South Korea
Coming Out of Age	年少年	Li Shida	China

Russian Premiere Competition

- Endless April (Бесконечный апрель), directed by Anton Butakov (Russia)
- Wolves (Волки), directed by Mikhail Kulunakov (Russia)
- Legends from the Past (Легенды наших предков), directed by Ivan Sosnin (Russia)
- License to Love (Мужу привет), directed by Anton Maslov (Russia)
- The Postman (Почтарь), directed by Andrey Razenkov (Russia)
- Impostors (Самозванцы), directed by Maria Reizen (Russia)
- There (Туда), directed by Ivan Petukhov (Russia)

== Awards ==
- Golden Saint George for Best Film: The Elysian Field by Pradip Kurbah, India
- Silver Saint George Special Jury Prize: Evacuation by Farkhat Sharipov, Kazakhstan
- Silver Saint George for Best Director: Pradip Kurbah, The Elysian Field, India
- Silver Saint George for Best Actor: Yevgeny Tsyganov, Family Happiness, Russia
- Silver Saint George for Best Actress: Maria Rodríguez Soto, A House on Fire, Spain
- Silver Saint George for Best Documentary: Ms. Hu's Garden by Pan Zhiqi, China
  - Special Mention for Documentary: The Winter Road by Yuri Dorokhin, Russia
- Silver Saint George for Best Short Film: Bumblebee by Fon Cortizo, Spain
- Special Jury Prize for Short Film: Tango by Fedor Malyshev, Russia
- Silver Saint George for Best Film in the Russian Premiere Competition: License to Love, by Anton Maslov, Russia
- NETPAC for Best Asian Film: The Elysian Field by Pradip Kurbah, India
- Audience Award: Two People in One Life and a Dog by Andrey Zaytsev, Russia
- Honorary Golden Saint George Prize for an outstanding contribution to the world cinema: Vladimir Ilyin (Russia)

Sources:

- Stanislavsky Award: Vladimir Mashkov
- Special Mention for Film: Beyond the Mast by Mohammad Nuruzzaman, Bangladesh
