= Baghjan (film) =

Indian Moran language film

- Directed by: Jaicheng Jai Dohutia
- Written by: Jaicheng Jai Dohutia
- Produced by: Jaicheng Jai Dohutia, MAYAMARA art & culture
- Release date: 2024
- Running time: 90 minutes
- Country: India
- Languages: Assamese; Moran

Baghjan is 2024 Assamese-Moran bilingual film directed and written by filmmaker Jaicheng Jai Dohutia and produced by MAYAMARA art & culture. The film is about the biggest industrial disasters; oil-leakage tragedy of 2020 at Baghjan.

== Plot ==
A prosperous oil and gas field surrounds the little village where fisherman Manab and his wife Bharabi reside. One day, while extracting oil, a huge explosion occurs, setting the entire community ablaze. The fire claims Bharabi's life. Manab cannot handle it. In the fire, he believes that his wife is still alive and is attempting to communicate with her.

== Cast ==
- Monuj Borkakoty
- Jadumoni Barua
- Pranali Bora
- Dandeswar Bora
- Sabita Bora
- Gunawati Hazarika
- Hemanta
- Barbi
- Gargi Gogoi

Most of the actors of this film are the real victims of the oil-leakage tragedy.

== Production ==
Baghjan is an Indo-German co-production film. It has been made by MAYAMARA art & culture in Baghjan, Tinsukia district, Assam.

== Awards ==
Year	Award	Category	Result	Ref
2021	Prasad Labs and Qube Moviebuff Appreciation Awards	Works-in-Progress (WIP) of Film Bazaar Online 2021	Won	
2022	Marche du Film	Cannes Film Festival 'Goes to Cannes'	Nominated	

== Conflict ==
On May 22, 2022, Dohutia voiced his disagreement with the State government's intention to send four people from the film business, including bureaucrats, to the Cannes Film Festival. He declared his intention to go to the festival to represent and promote the movie. In order for Dohutia and his crew to represent their film and the state in France, he also asked that the state government pay for their travel costs.
