= 2020 Assam gas and oil leak =

Oilfield accident in India

Coordinates: 27.604°N 95.405°E

- Date: 27 May 2020
- Duration: 6 months
- Location: Baghjan Oilfield, Tinsukia district, Assam, India
- Also known as: Baghjan gas leak
- Cause: Natural gas leak, which later caught fire
- Outcome: Leak has been controlled and sealed
- Deaths: 3

The 2020 Assam gas and oil leak, also referred as the Baghjan gas leak, was a blowout and methane leak that happened in Oil India Limited's Baghjan Oilfield in Tinsukia district, Assam, India on 27 May 2020. The blowout occurred at Well No. 5 in the Baghjan Oil Field, resulting in a leak of natural gas. The leaking well subsequently caught fire on 9 June 2020, and resulted in three deaths (Officially), large-scale local evacuations, and environmental damage to the nearby Dibru-Saikhowa National Park and Maguri-Motapung Wetland.

The blowout was "killed" on 15 November 2020, 173 days after the blowout, with a technique called snubbing. Subsequently, Well No. 5 was abandoned on 3 December 2020. An investigation by a committee appointed by the National Green Tribunal revealed in November 2020 that Oil India Limited had failed to obtain legally required clearances to operate the oil field at Baghjan, and had failed to comply with provisions of environmental laws as well as with internal safety procedures in relation to drilling at the oil field. The findings reiterated a report by the Assam State Pollution Control Board, which had also reported that Oil India Limited did not obtain the necessary clearances before drilling.

== Background ==
=== Location and environmental conditions ===
The Baghjan Oil Field is located in Tinsukia district in the State of Assam, near Baghjan village, which has a resident population of 4,488 persons. The nearest towns are Doom Dooma and Tinsukia.

Baghjan Oil Field is located near the Dibru-Saikhowa National Park in Assam, and is also in proximity to Maguri Motapung Beel, a natural wetland. Dibru-Saikhowa National Park is the only riverine island wildlife reserve, globally. It contains a variety of rare and endangered species, including the Gangetic dolphin, which is endangered, as well as herds of wild horses, tigers, capped langurs, hoolock gibbons, slow loris, and several rare butterflies and fish. The Dibru-Saikhowa National Park is also connected to Namdapha National Park via the Dehing Patkai Wildlife Sanctuary. These regions are part of the Indo-Burma Biodiversity Hotspot. Baghjan Well No. 5, from which the leak occurred, is located at a distance of 900 meters from the park and adjoins a buffer forested region surrounding the park. It is also close to the Indo-Burma Biodiversity Hotspot.

On 18 January 2020, the Central Government exempted all oil and gas firms conducting exploratory drilling from legal requirements for environmental clearances. Prior to the leak, in 2020, the region witnessed protests after the Government of India announced that they had authorized Oil India Limited (OIL) to explore the area under Dibru-Saikhowa National Park for hydrocarbons.

During May 2020, prior to and during the leak, Tinsukia district in Assam experienced heavy rains and flooding in two local rivers, Dibru and Lohit. The region was also placed in lockdown, following the COVID-19 pandemic in India.

=== Environmental authorizations ===
A subsequent investigation by Assam's State Pollution Control Board found that Oil India Limited had begun drilling at the Baghjan Oil Field without obtaining prior environmental clearances in accordance with legal requirements under the Water (Prevention of Control of Pollution) Act, 1974, Air (Prevention of Control of Pollution) Act 1981 and Environment Protection Act, 1986. Oil India Limited had also failed to conduct mandatory public hearings before beginning drilling.

The Eco-Sensitive Zone around Dibru-Saikhowa National Park was reduced in size at the request of Oil India Limited in order to allow the well to be established. In 2013, the Baghjan Oil Field was inspected by a team from the National Board for Wildlife, which criticised the Government of India for ratifying the breach of wildlife norms after Oil India Limited had already begun operating in an eco-sensitive zone.

=== Prior leaks ===
In 2005, a blowout at an Oil India Limited well in Dikom in Assam resulted in the evacuation of 500 families. The leak subsequently caught fire, as well.

On 3 February 2020 near Naharkatia in Assam, a stretch of the Burhi Dihing river, which is a tributary to the Brahmaputra river, caught fire after a punctured pipeline carrying crude oil from the Oil India Limited headquarters at Duliajan in Assam leaked, covering the water with a film of oil. The fire burned for a period of 48 hours before the leak was repaired and it could be extinguished. Oil India Limited officials stated that a technical error with their instruments had caused shut off valves in a storage tank to close, resulting in pressure building up in a pipeline carrying crude oil. This caused several leaks in the pipeline. Oil India Limited Officials blamed local residents for causing the fire, and stated that a number of leaks had previously occurred, as parts of attempts to steal quantities of crude oil from the delivery pipeline. The Central Pollution Control Board had directed Assam's State Pollution Control Board to investigate the damage to aquatic life and local environment caused by the leak.

=== Drilling at Baghjan 5 Well ===
The Baghjan Oil Field has 21 active wells, of which 4 produce natural gas, while the remaining produce oil. Baghjan Oil Field's Well No. 5 was established in 2006 and produces natural gas. It drills down to a depth of 3,870 meters, and was producing between 80,000 and 100,000 standard cubic meters of gas per day before the leak. Drilling at the Baghjan 5 well, where the leak occurred, was being outsourced to an Ahmedabad-based firm, John Energy. In May 2020, a new reservoir was being tapped for additional production at a depth of 3,729 meters, with workover operations taking place In addition, the infrastructure for the previous reservoir was being serviced, due to which production had been temporarily stopped. A device for pressure control, known as a blowout preventer, had been temporarily uninstalled while the extraction assembly was being serviced.

In April 2020, following a lockdown caused by the COVID-19 pandemic in India, Oil India Limited suspended drilling at several of the wells in the Baghjan Oil Field, primarily because of the unavailability of employees.

On 20 May 2020, before the leak, the Ministry of Environment, Forest and Climate Change announced that they would be authorizing exploration for hydrocarbons under the Dibru-Saikhowa National Park, at seven different locations. Oil India Limited stated that they would be using Extended Reach Drilling (ERD) to explore these wells without entering the National Park itself. Baghjan Oil Well 5, at which the leak occurred, will be one of the bases on which the ERD will extend under the National Park.

== Blowout, leak, and fire ==
=== Initial occurrence ===
On 27 May 2020, at 10:30 a.m., residents of Baghjan village in Assam reported hearing a loud sound from the nearby Baghjan Oil Field. Reports of the sound of the explosion were also confirmed from residents of Tinsukia town, which is located at a distance of 12 kilometres from the Oil Field. Local newspaper, the Sentinel, reported local accounts indicating that the gushing of natural gas from the well continued to produce an audible sound over the next few days.

Although production had been temporarily stopped at Baghjan's Well No. 5 to explore a new sand, and to service the well, workers noticed that gas was escaping from the capped well, and had begun to evacuate the Oil Field before the incident. At 10:30 a.m, the blowout occurred, resulted in the leak of natural gas from the well, and causing a complete suspension in operations. Oil India Limited's official statement indicated that the well had "suddenly became very active" while workover operations were ongoing.

OIL officials confirmed that the leak occurred from the existing sand which had been capped to allow exploration of the new sand. This resulted in a "fountain of crude oil" from the sand.

The leaked gas consisted of a naturally occurring mix of propane, methane, propylene and other gases.

=== Fires ===
On 9 June 2020, Well No. 5 caught fire after efforts to cap the leak were unsuccessful. An official from Oil India Limited stated, "We cannot say how and why it happened," in regard to the fire, also noting that fires, in the case of a blowout, were not unexpected. The fire occurred at the plinth of the well while cleaning operations were under way. Following the fire, people who had not yet been evacuated from the local area left, as the fire spread to local grasslands. The fire quickly spread to a larger area and burned down nearby trees, crops and houses. 4 persons were injured, and 50 houses destroyed in the resulting fire. The Tinsukia District Collector stated that the condensate from the gas leak in surrounding areas had made the locale more vulnerable to fire and had allowed the fire to spread faster.

On 10 June 2020, two firefighters, Durlov Gogoi and Tikheswar Gohain died fighting the fire. Their bodies were recovered from a water body near the site.

Recently on 21 July 2020, an explosion occurred as the well number 5 and three foreign experts were injured in the incident.

=== Evacuation ===
Following the leak, 1610 local families, consisting of approximately 3000 persons were evacuated to relief camps. A safety zone consisting of a 1.5 km radius around the well was established. The National Disaster Relief Force was deployed to establish the relief camps. In addition to local residents, employees of Oil India Limited and their families were also evacuated from the area. The Indian Air Force and Indian Army also provided assistance.

=== Environmental damage ===
State Pollution Control Board officials stated that the leaked gas condensate had affected local agricultural crops and plants, including bamboo, tea, bananas and betel nuts. Wind conditions had carried the leaked gas towards the Dibru-Saikhowa National Park as well.

On 29 May 2020, the carcass of a Gangetic dolphin covered in condensated oil was found in the Maguri Motapung Beel, a local wetland, and sent for a post-mortem by the Tinsukia Wildlife Division, to establish the cause of death. Wildlife Division officials noted that because of rain immediately following the leak, local waterbodies had been contaminated by condensate from the leak. On 31 May 2020, Assam Government officials confirmed that the State Pollution Control Board was investigating environmental damage as a result of the leak. Following the leak, the State Forest Department had also asked Oil India Limited to account for its actions after reports of dead fish in local waterbodies.

On 5 June 2020, local residents protested near the Maguri Motapung Beel wetland, calling for the protection of the ecologically sensitive Dibru-Saikhowa National Park, to mark World Environment Day, and called for compensation for their loss of livelihoods as a result of the leak.

== Efforts to contain and stem the leak ==
=== Initial response ===
Operations at Baghjan Oil Field were suspended following the blowout and leakage of natural gas. OIL (Oil India Limited) requested assistance from the Crisis Management Team of the Oil and Natural Gas Corporation of India. IOC initially attempted to install a blowout preventer to bring the leak under control. OIL also sprayed the area with water. On 30 May 2020, four days after the initial leak, a spokesperson from Oil India Limited confirmed that "The well control operation is yet to start." Oil India Limited officials also stated that the process of controlling the well would take time, and that they were currently making arrangements to secure a water supply to help mitigate the leak.

=== Attempts to cap the well ===
==== Placing a blowout preventer ====
In June 2020, Oil India Limited officials stated that they had constructed a temporary reservoir of water in the vicinity of the well, by placing pipes from the Dangori river. Water from the reservoir would be used to spray on to the well area to protect workers while they attempted to place a blowout preventer, using hydraulic devices, followed by injecting mud to completely shut down production of gas, or "kill" the well. Singapore-based Alert Disaster Control experts were called in to assist with the process.

Initial efforts to control the leak were delayed because of severe flooding in Assam, which caused widespread damage and resulted in the deaths of 16 persons. Oil India Limited said that because of the floods, working conditions at the Oil Field were temporarily unsafe, as the Dangori river which was being used to pump water to the field, was overflowing. The nearby Doom Dooma-Baghjan bridge had collapsed due to the flooding, and consequently, access roads to the site were unavailable.

There were two failed attempts to place the blowout preventer on Well No. 5. On 22 July 2020, during one such attempt, three Singaporean expert advisors were injured after a fire broke out. On 18 August 2020, a blowout preventer was successfully placed at the well head on a third attempt, but the process of 'killing the well' by injecting mud to completely stop production of natural gas from the well was not successful, and the well continued to leak. Oil India Limited officials stated that the reason for the failure was that a valve in the well casing collapsed.

==== Snubbing and diversion ====
On 3 September 2020, Assam's Commerce and Industry Minister, C. M. Patowary informed the Assam Legislative Assembly that experts from Canada had been brought in to attempt to cap the well again. Oil India Limited's officials stated that they were also considering an attempt to divert the gas produced at Well No. 5 into two separate channels. If successful, this will result the diversion of part of the gas being produced to the Baghjan Early Production System facility, while the remaining gas will be flared. Once the diversion has occurred, an attempt will be made to cap the well at a greater depth, in a process called snubbing. On 13 September 2020, Oil India Limited succeeded in diverting the gas leaking from Well No. 5 to nearby flare pits on a second attempt. The first attempt at such a diversion had been unsuccessful. The well has not as yet been controlled, and on 30 September 2020, Sushil Chandra Mishra, the managing director of OIL stated that it would take two more months to kill the well and stop the leak. On 3 September 2020, Assam's Commerce and Industry Minister, C. M. Patowary stated that it may take another two months to control the leak. On 13 September 2020, Oil India succeeded in diverting some of the leaking gas to flare pits, but has yet to completely control the leak and 'kill' the well.

On 5 November 2020, a second attempt to snub the well was initiated. This included flying in 60 tonnes of the snubbing unit from Canada's Calgary by an Antonov An-24. In the final phase of snubbing, “kill fluid” or cement-laced chemical mud was injected to "kill" the blowout well. This was successfully completed on 15 November 2020. Subsequently, OIL initiated the process to abandon the Well No-5, which was completed on 3 December 2020.

== Consequences ==
=== Fatalities and evacuations ===
Two firefighters employed by Oil India Limited died on 10 June 2020 while fighting the fire resulting from the gas leak. Four other fire fighters suffered injuries. Local reports indicate that there have been more deaths in the area; an inquiry by a local magistrate is currently investigating these claims. On 10 September 2020, an engineer working with Oil India Limited, Arnab Kishore Bordoloi, died while working at the well site. The cause of death is yet to be established.

As of September 2020, 500 persons are currently still residing in relief camps, with the surrounding area still being affected by audible sounds of the gas leak as well as the ongoing fire. Local reports indicate that the sound of the leak can be heard from a distance of 5 kilometres from the site of the leak.

=== Litigation and compensation ===
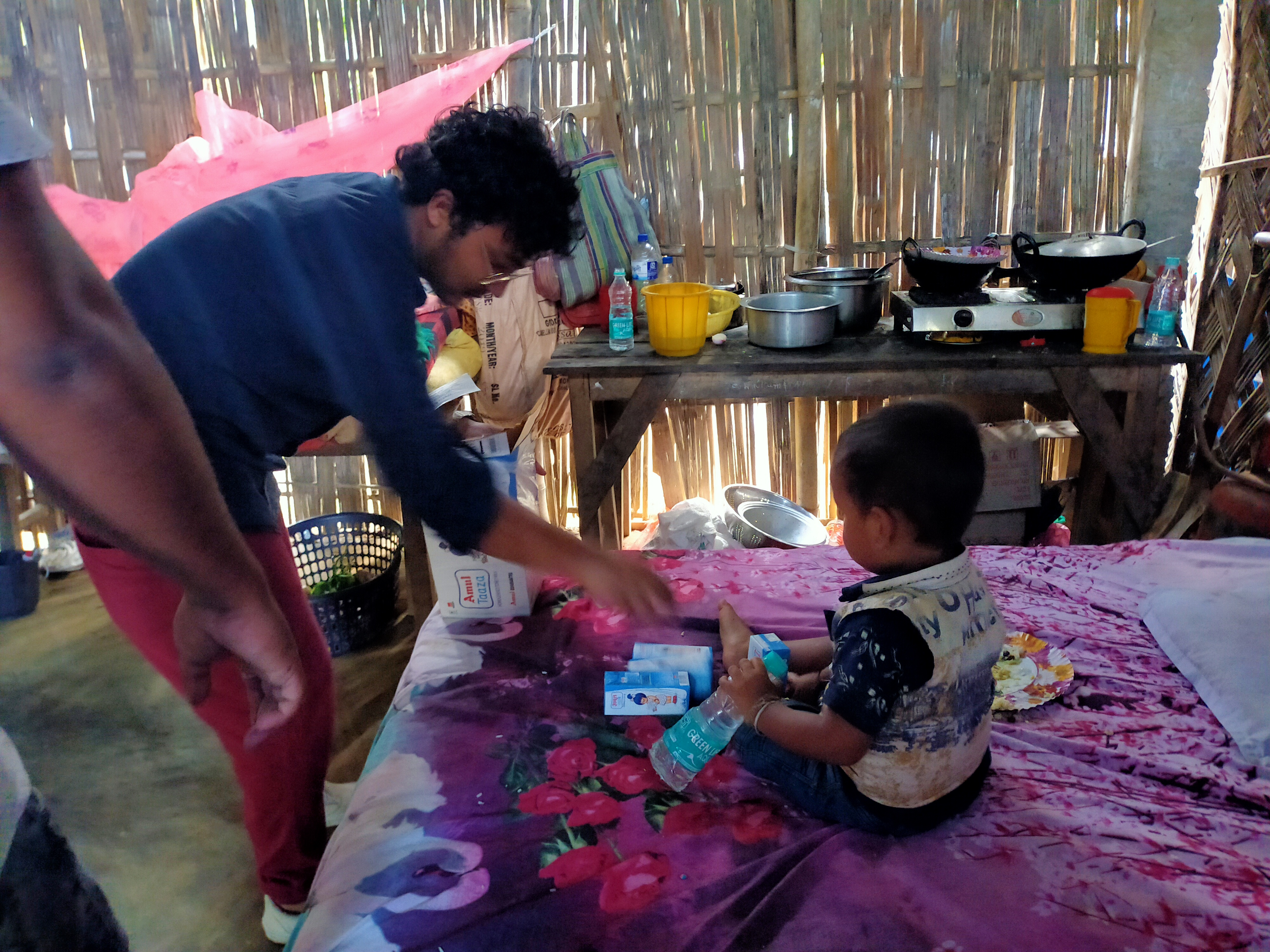
Relief distribution at the crude oil accident area of Baghlan, Tinsukia, 22 June 2020

On 25 June 2020, the National Green Tribunal found a prima facie case had been made out against Oil India Limited for damage to the environment and local livelihoods because of the leak. The Tribunal ordered Oil India Limited to deposit a sum of ₹250 million with the District Magistrate of Tinsukia towards compensation, and constituted an expert committee to investigate the disaster and recommend how much compensation was payable to affected persons. The expert committee constituted by the National Green Tribunal recommended that completely damaged houses would result in compensation of ₹ 2,500,000, while those that were severely and moderately damaged would receive ₹1,000,000 and ₹250,000 each. From 24 August 2020 onwards, local residents staged a peaceful protest, establishing a camp in front of the office of the local Deputy Commissioner, to ensure that all persons whose homes were damaged in the fire and leak received more compensation. The Assam Government confirmed to the Assam Legislative Assembly that some families had been issued compensation. Oil India Limited had filed objections to these orders for compensation in the National Green Tribunal, but the Tribunal dismissed their objections on 8 August 2020. OIL announced that they will give ₹30,000 as compensation to all those families who are affected. On 1 October 2020, the Gauhati High Court agreed to hear a public interest litigation petition filed by two local residents, and ordered OIL as well as a number of government authorities, including the Assam Government, the National Board for Wildlife, the State Board for Wildlife, and the State and Central Boards for Pollution Control, to respond to concerns raised about drilling inside the Dibru-Saikhowa National Park.

=== Internal investigation and criticism ===
On 30 May 2020, an Oil India Limited spokesperson stated to press that a five-member investigative committee had been established to ascertain the causes of the blowout and leak. On 10 June 2020, Oil India Limited confirmed that two employees had been placed on suspension in connection with the leak.

The Indian Oil Workers Union criticized the use of private contractors at Well No.5, calling on Oil India Limited to use only trained corporation employees for such work.

=== Government investigations and environmental damage ===
==== Assam Government ====
The initial leak at the Baghjan Oil Field resulted in the contamination of water bodies in the nearby Maguri Motapung Beel wetland, as well as in the Dibru-Saikhowa National Park. Days after the leak, local forest officials reported seeing a layer of gas condensate on water bodies in the Dibru-Saikhowa National Park. An Environmental Impact Assessment Report was subsequently being prepared to assess the damage caused by the leak and fire. On 12 June 2020, the Assam state government ordered an investigation into the environmental impact of the leak, and asked for a report within a month. An expert committee was formed by Assam's Forest Department to investigate the environmental impact.

On 21 June 2020, Assam's State Pollution Control Board (SPCB) ordered Oil India Limited to shut down all production at the Baghjan Oil Field, following an investigation that revealed that the company had begun drilling operations there without obtaining prior environmental clearances. The SPCB also found that the company had failed to comply with continuing reporting and certification requirements under environmental laws. Oil India Limited objected to this notice of closure, stating that it could potentially result in more blowouts at the wells. The closure notification was withdrawn three days after it was issued.

Commenting on the government's measures following the disaster and intersecting it with the extractive industries in the district, sociologist Sanjay Barbora and geologist Sarat Phukan reflect,

The government of Assam’s remedial measures like announcing the formation of Dehing Patkai as a national park, as well as the legal obligations pressed upon OIL to follow through compensatory payments to those affected by the Baghjan tragedy, raise hope and despair in equal measure. Hope, because of the enormous interest raised by ordinary citizens during a time when they were atomised by pandemic-induced lockdowns, where seams of the conflict and violent history were dug out as evidence of corporate greed and governmental collusion. Despair, because none of the contentious history and complicated contemporary realities seem to have found their way into the responses of the state (including the Gauhati High Court), the public sector (OIL, ONGC and CIL), or the tea companies.

==== Union Government ====
The Indian Government's Ministry of Petroleum and Natural Gas has also ordered an investigation into the gas leak. On 2 August 2020, the Wildlife Institute of India, which operates under the Ministry of Environment, Forest and Climate Change issued a report in which they stated that Oil India Limited had failed to address security concerns after two previous leaks in Dikom and Naharkatia in Assam. Their report indicated that between 60 and 70 hectares of land had been damaged by the leak, and noted particular concerns about the biodiversity in the Tinsukia district. The Wildlife Institute of India's report stated that the leak would have "....prolonged ill effects on all life forms, including humans," in the area.

==== National Green Tribunal ====
On 26 June 2020, the National Green Tribunal constituted an expert committee headed by a former judge, A.P. Katakey to investigate the reasons for, and the impact, of the gas blowout. The expert committee was constituted after a preliminary report requested by the Tribunal revealed that there were errors in internal safety procedures that resulted in the incident. The preliminary report indicated that compliance with these safety procedures could have prevented the blowout. The Katakey Committee reported in November 2020 that Oil India Limited had repeatedly violated provisions of the Air (Prevention and Control of Pollution) Act, 1981, the Water (Prevention and Control of Pollution) Act, 1974, and the Environment Protection Act 1986. The committee also found that Oil India Limited had failed to obtain the necessary clearances for the Baghjan Oil Field, and had not conducted Biodiversity Impact Assessment Study before beginning operations, which had been made mandatory by a Supreme Court order.

== In popular culture ==
Discovery Channel made a two-part documentary on the disaster. It was aired in March 2021 and was also made available on YouTube.

== See also ==
- Visakhapatnam gas leak
