= Jaicheng Jai Dohutia =

Indian film director and producer

Jaicheng Xai Dohutia
- Born: 1982 (age 43–44)
- Education: DoomDooma College
- Alma mater: Jyoti Chitraban Film and Television Institute
- Occupations: Film director, film producer
- Years active: 2008 – present
- Notable work: Jolsobi, Baghjan
- Awards: National Award

Jaicheng Xai Dohutia is an Indian film director, editor, writer and cinematographer from Tongana Gaon, a small, isolated village in Tinsukia district, Assam. He is an alumnus of Jyoti Chitraban Film & Television Institute, Guwahati currently known as Dr. Bhupen Hazarika Regional Government Film and Television Institute.

== Filmography ==
Year	Title	English title	Language	Ref
2014	Chaak-Soni	Cuckoo	Assamese	
2016	Haanduk	The Hidden Corner	Assamese, Moran	
2023	Jolsobi	End of Spring	Assamese	
2024	Baghjan	I don't wanna sit in my cemetry	Assamese	

== Awards ==
Year	Film	Category	Occasions	Remarks	Ref
2016	Haanduk	Grand Jury award	Mumbai International Film Festival	A persuasive poetic film reflecting on how family connections can endure even when shaken by political turmoil and grief.	
2017	Haanduk	Best Regional Film Special Jury Prize NETPAC Award	64th National Film Award Guwahati International Film Festival All lights India International Film Festival	For its genuine aesthetic sensibility and dramatic approach in depicting a long-lasting political struggle in a remote region.	
2021	Baghjan	Prasad Labs and Qube Moviebuff Appreciation Awards Cannes Film Festival 'Goes to Cannes'	Works-in-Progress (WIP) of Film Bazaar Online 2021 Marché du Film		
2022	Jolsobi	Prag Cine Awards	45th São Paulo International Film Festival	Best Screenplay, Best Director, Best Cinematography in the New Director's Competition section.	
