= Haanduk =

Haanduk হান্দুক (The Hidden Corner)
- Directed by: Jaicheng Jai Dohutia
- Written by: Bhaskar Jyoti Das; Jaicheng Jai Dohutia
- Produced by: Jaicheng Jai Dohutia
- Starring: Bandoi Chettia; Bishal Anurag; Nivedita Baruah; Jitu Kumar Moran
- Cinematography: Chidaa Bora
- Edited by: Diganta Bora
- Production company: Mayamara Productions
- Release date: 23 October 2016 (MAMI)
- Running time: 83 minutes
- Country: India
- Languages: Assamese, Moran

Haanduk (The Hidden Corner) is an Assamese/Moran language film directed, written, and produced by debut independent filmmaker Jaicheng Jai Dohutia and produced by Mayamara Productions. The movie is allegedly based on real news stories and incidences of radical militarization in Northeast India. The movie stars first time, non-professional actors Bandoi Chetia, Bishal Anurag, Nivedita Baruah, and Jitu Moran. The film was initially a work-in-progress selected by NFDC's work-in-progress lab as a Film Bazaar Recommends Film to be developed and brought into post-production via their workshop and eminent panel of international advisors. The movie is awaiting a release in 2016.

== Plot ==
An elderly woman named Hermoni receives a mutilated and bullet ridden body at her doorstep. She begins to question whether the body is that of her son Mukti, who left home years ago to join a radical insurgent group in Northeast India. Hermoni gets in contact with her son's childhood friend, Sewali who waits for him in longing. Meanwhile, another member of the insurgent group, Biplop, has returned to the village, renouncing his membership from the group and hoping to return sanity back to his life.

== Cast ==
- Bandoi Chetia as Heramoni
- Nivedita Baruah as Sewali
- Bishal Anurag as Biplob
- Jitu Moran as Oikya

== Production ==
Jaicheng Jai Dohutia started to write the script in 2012, and in 2013 he met writer Bhaskar Jyoti Das who ended up being a co-writer of the final draft. He submitted the script of Haanduk to the NFDC Film Bazaar which selected it as one of its finalists to develop and produce. The movie cast non-professional actors, some who were local villagers and others who are professionals in other fields and the crew was composed of personal friends of Dohutia. Dohutia's cinematographer, Chida Bora shot the film in 19 days with a Canon EOS 5D Mark III. The movie released a trailer early in 2016.

== Award ==
Grand Jury Prize - India Gold at Mumbai Film Festival (MAMI)

64th National Film Award-2017, section best feature film in each of the languages other than those specified in schedule vi of the Constitution.

Best Assamese Film: Assam State Film Awards-2016

Best Director: Assam State Film Awards-2016

Special Jury Award- Guwahati International Film Festival, 2017
