= Chandubi Lake =

Lake in Assam, India

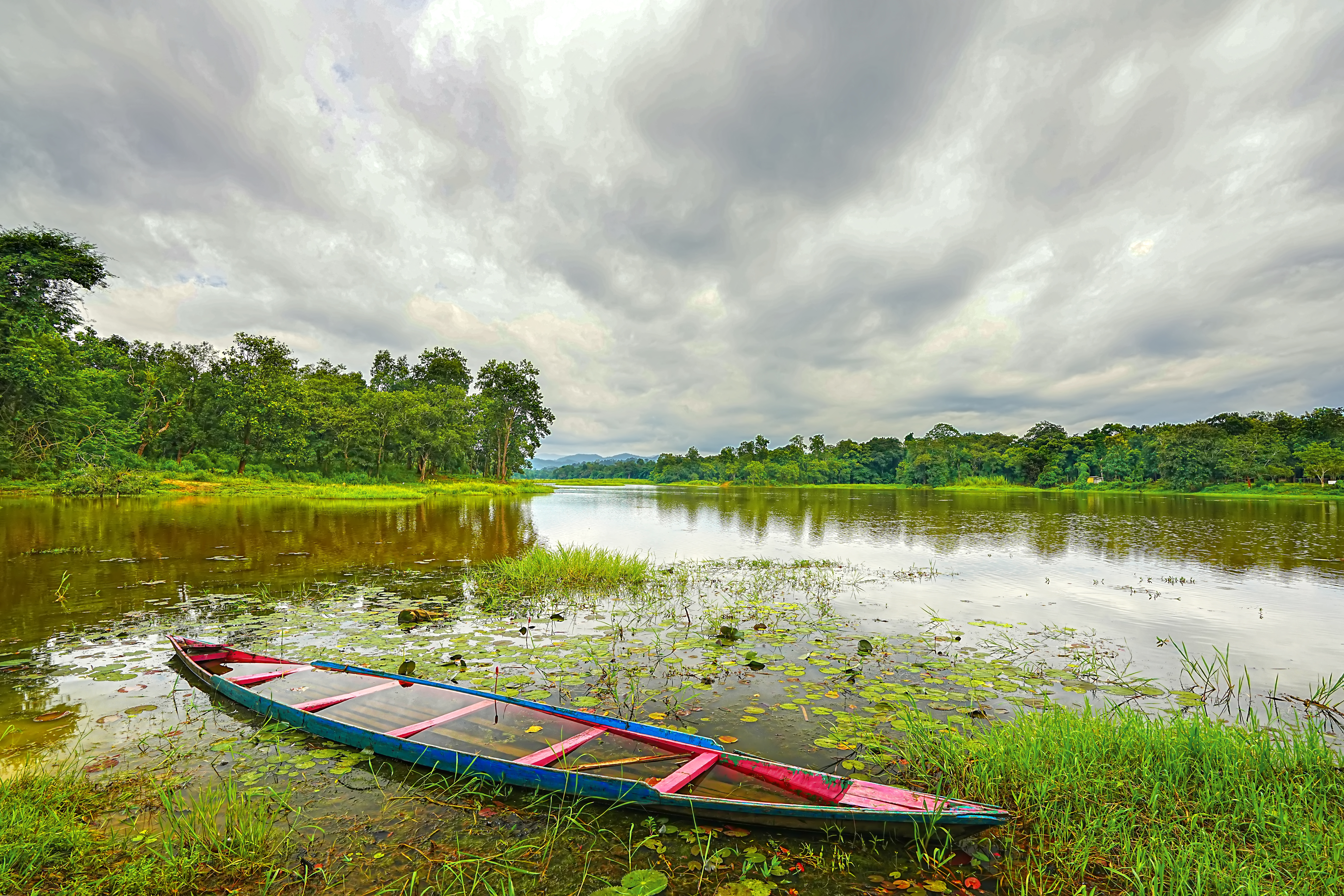
- Interactive map of Chandubi Lake
- Location: Kamrup District, Assam, India
- Coordinates: 25°52′47″N 91°25′11″E
- Type: lake

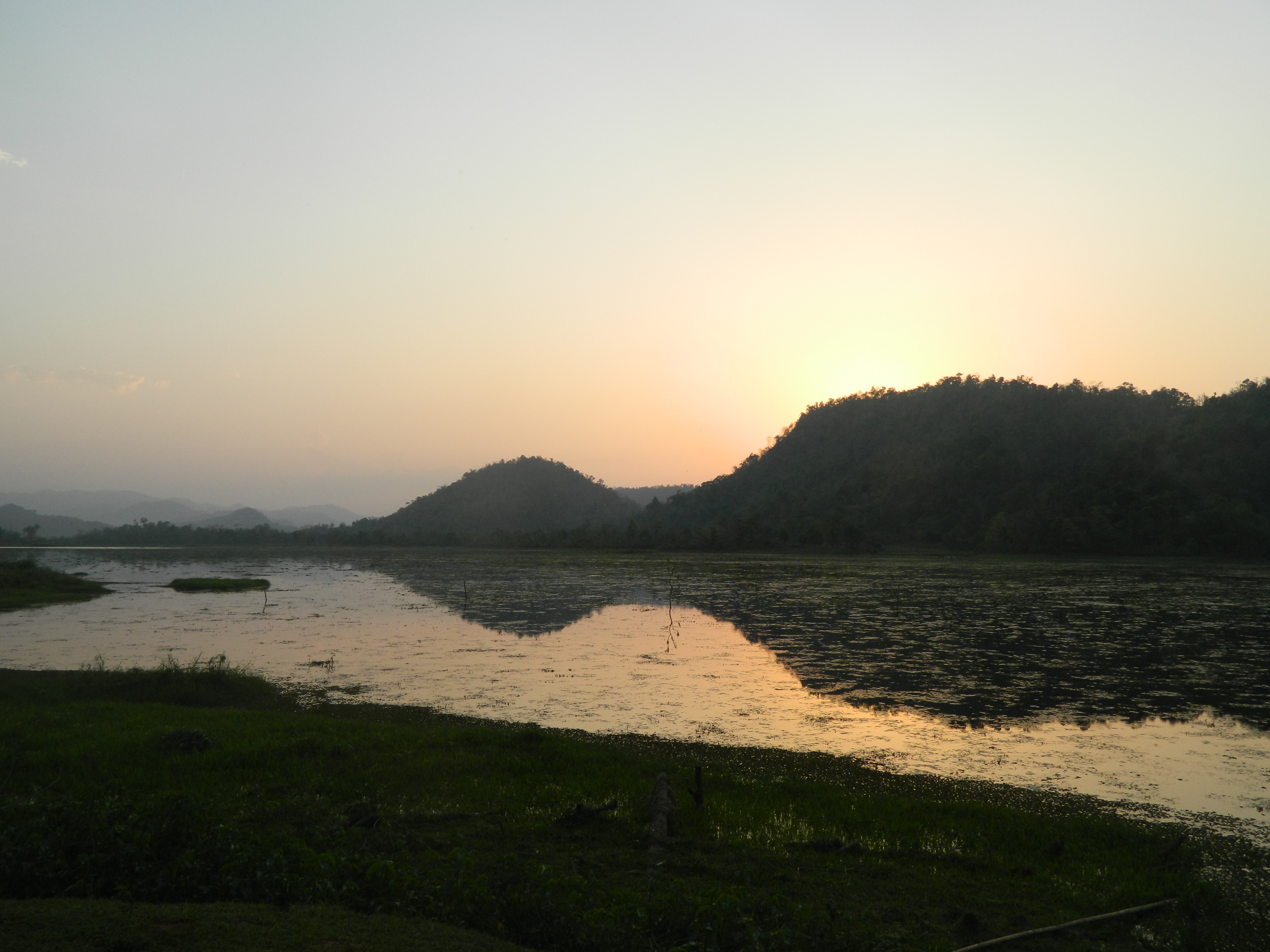

Chandubi Lake (Rabha pronunciation: [/ˌʧʌnˈdʊbɪ/]) is a natural lake located in Rabha Hasong Autonomous Council, Kamrup District, Assam at a distance of 64 kilometres (40 mi) from the city of Guwahati and is accessible through National Highway 37. The lake is located at the foot of Garo Hills surrounded by Assam and Meghalaya. The area is covered by deep forest, and dotted with small villages. The lake attracts migratory birds during winter. It is a natural sightseeing and picnic spot.

== Geology ==
This lake was formed on 12 June 1897 in the evening by an earthquake that hit Assam. During that period the forest went down and became the lake.

== Tourism ==
The lake's chief feature is the natural lagoon that has been formed in the lake. The lake offers fishing, and the administrators of the lake have provided facilities to go rowing in the lake waters.

Chandubi Lake is a tourist destination, with some tourists visiting the lake during the Chandubi festival in first week of January. In this festival, local village people perform their traditional or cultural dance forms, and stalls offer local traditional food.

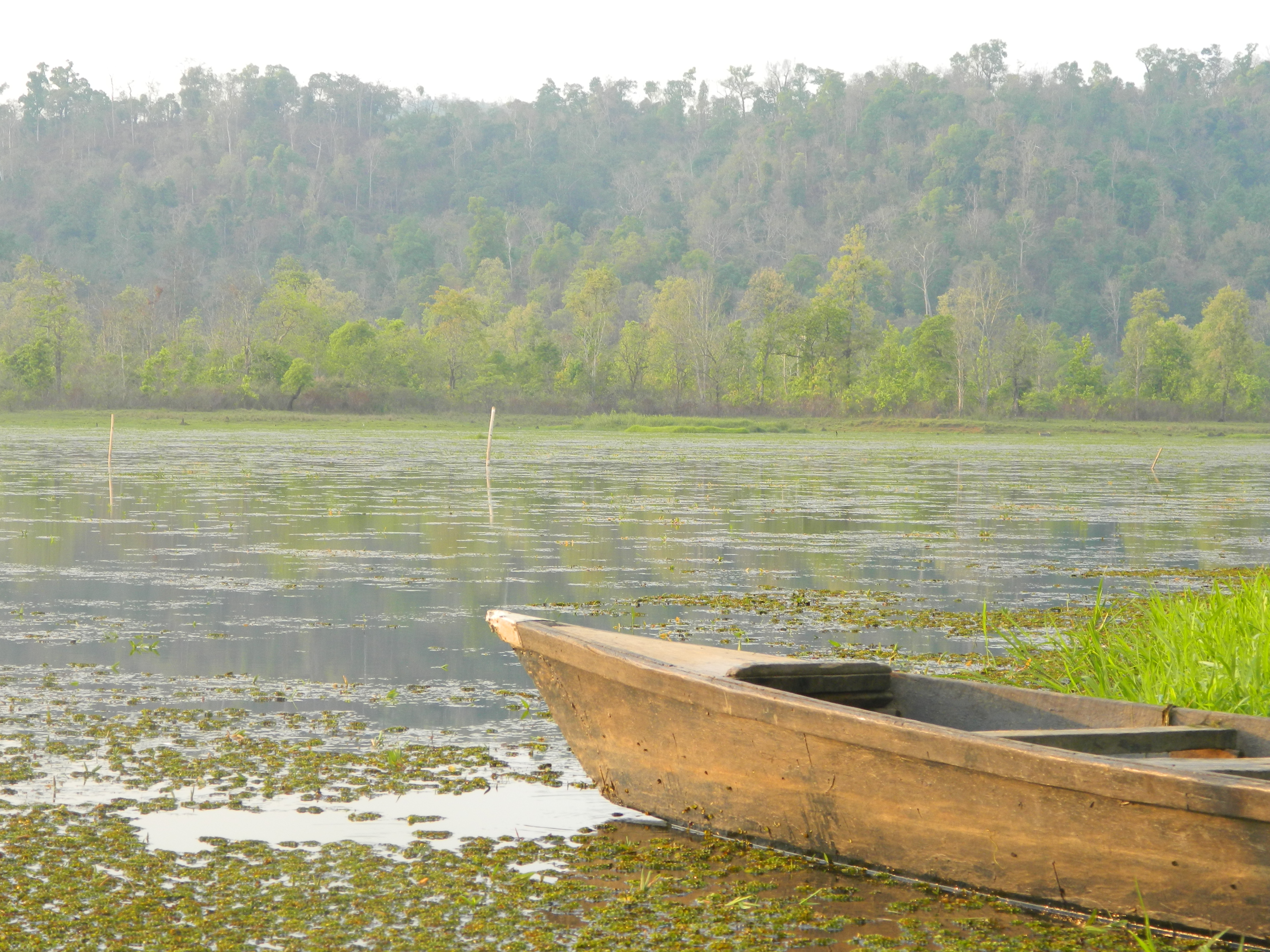
Chandubi Lake

== In popular culture ==
The psychological thriller Indian Hindi-language film Pepper Chicken was shot entirely in the jungles around this lake.

== See also ==
- Dipor Bil
- List of lakes in India
- List of lakes of Assam
