= Maguri Motapung Beel =

Lake in Assam

- মাগুৰি মটাপুং বিল (Assamese)
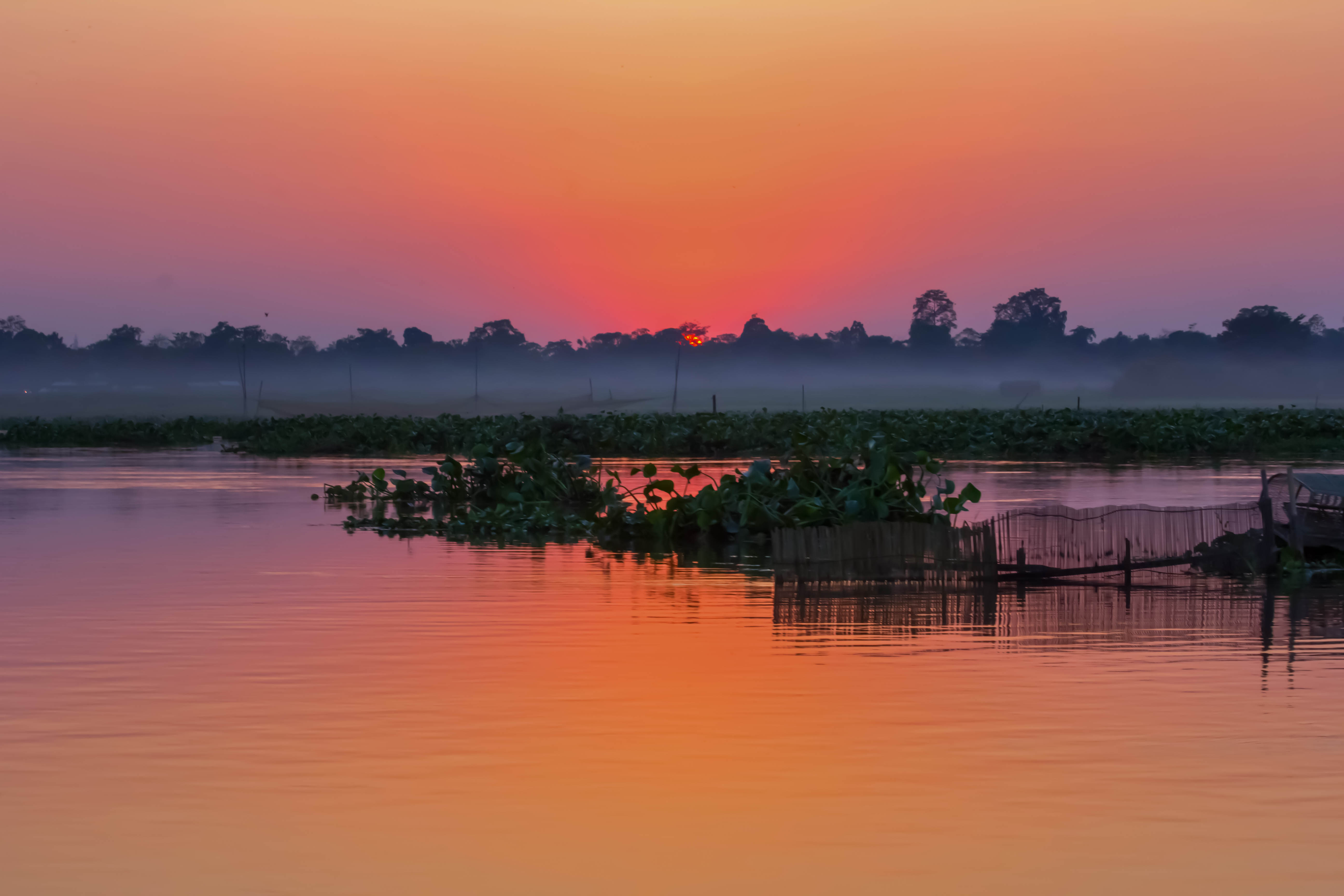
- Maguri Motapung Beel in Tinsukia district of Assam

- Location within Assam Location within India
- Location: Near to Dibru-Saikhowa National Park and Motapung Village, Tinsukia district, Assam, India
- Coordinates: 27°34′36.2″N 95°23′42.9″E
- Surface area: 9.6 square kilometres (3.7 mi^{2})

Maguri Motapung Beel (also known as Maguri Motapung Bill, Maguri Bill and Maguri Beel) is a wetland and lake located near Dibru-Saikhowa National Park and Motapung Village of Tinsukia district in Assam. Maguri Motapung Beel serves as a natural home to wildlife and provide a source of livelihood to the local communities.

== Etymology ==
Maguri is the local term for walking catfish and Motapung is the name of the nearby village. Beel or Bill means lake in Assamese language.

== Geography ==
Maguri Motapung Beel is approx. 9 km away from Tinsukia town and 50 km from Dibrugarh Airport. This lake is 3.8 km away from Guijan Ferry Ghat which is the gateway of the Dibru-Saikhowa National Park. Maguri Motapung Beel is located in the south bank of the Dibru River and it connects Dibru River through a small channel and finally meets Brahmaputra River.

== Avifauna ==
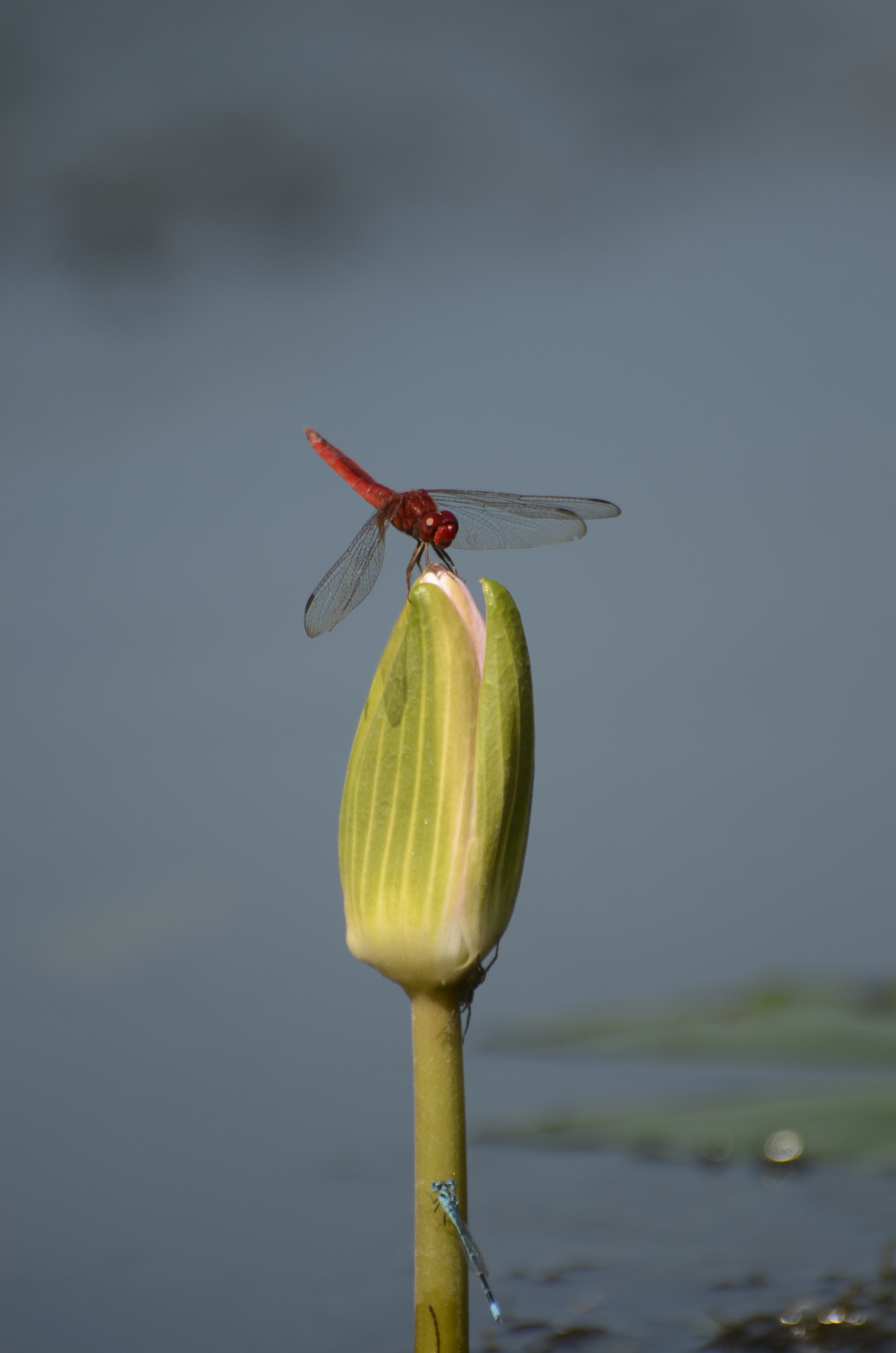
Ruddy marsh skimmer from Maguri Motapung Beel

Maguri Motapung Beel is a natural habitat to many varieties of birds. The lake is an important habitat for over 110 resident and migratory bird species, including eight listed as threatened on the IUCN Red List, such as the Swamp grass babbler, the ferruginous duck, the white-winged wood duck and the falcated duck.

A rare Mandarin duck was spotted in 2021 in the wetland Maguri Motapung Beel for the first time in 118 years.

== See also ==
List of lakes of Assam
