= Samaguri Beel =

Lake in Assam

- Pokhi Tirtha (Bird Pilgrimage)
- চামগুৰি বিল (Assamese)
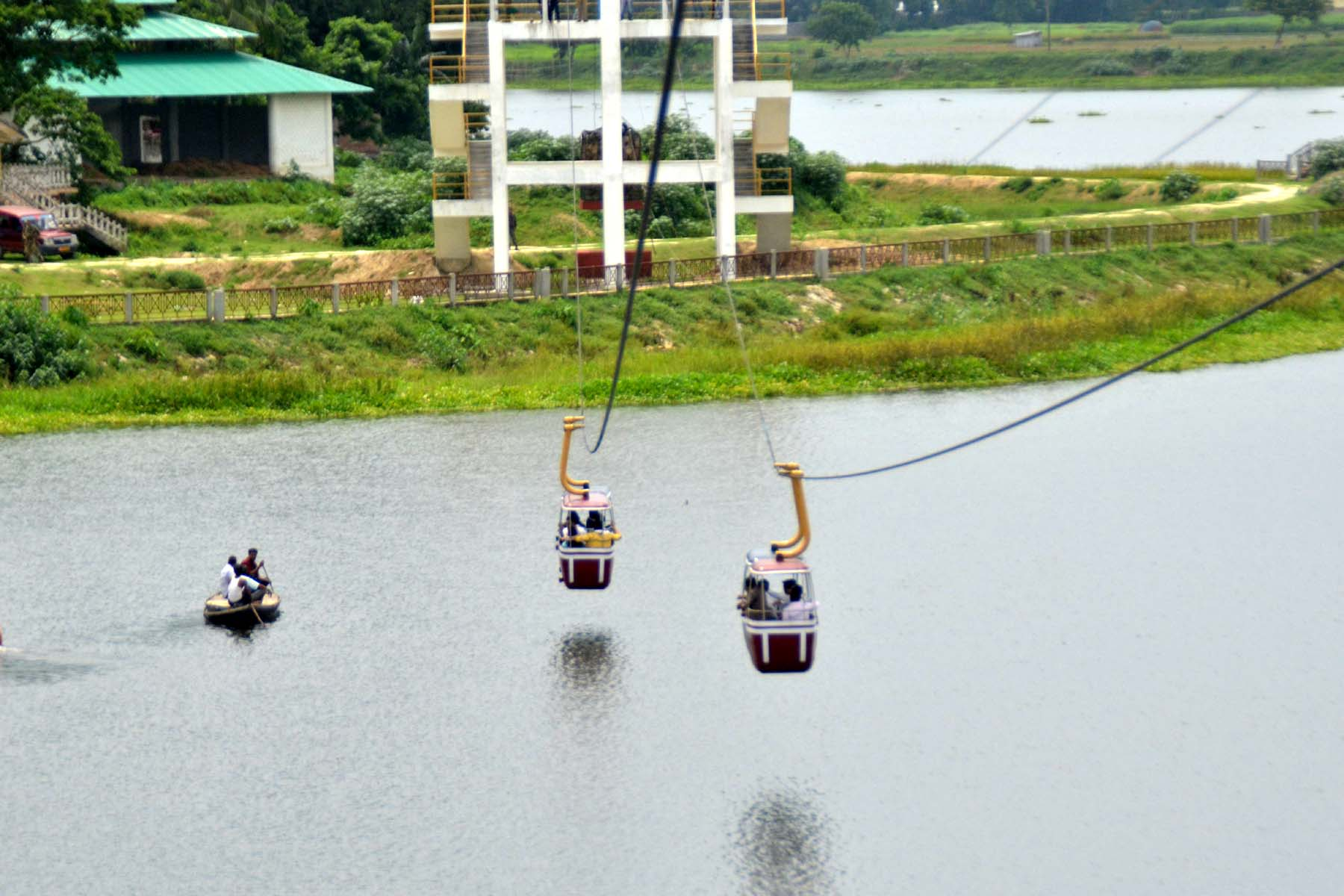
- Ropeway at Samaguri Beel

- Location within Assam Location within India
- Location: Samaguri, near Nagaon, Nagaon district, Assam, India
- Coordinates: 26°25′25.4″N 92°51′39.7″E

Samaguri Beel (also known as Pokhi Tirtha or Bird Pilgrimage) is an ox-bow shaped (U-shaped) wetland and lake located near to Nagaon town in Nagaon district of Assam. The Beel is situated in the Brahmaputra River basin. The lake was formed by the abandoned path of the Kolong River.

== Etymology ==
Samaguri Beel is popularly known as Pokhi Tirtha. Pokhi Tirtha is the Assamese term for Bird Pilgrimage. Migratory birds use this lake for during their winter stopovers.

== Avifauna ==
Varieties of species of migratory bird visit the Samaguri during winter, such as Lesser whistling duck, Fulvous whistling duck, Ferruginous pochard, Whiskered tern, Cotton pygmy goose, Cinnamon bittern, Grey-headed lapwing etc. This lake is a natural habitat to many varieties of birds, too; such as Bronze-winged jacana, Indian Pond Heron, Oriental Darter, Cattle Egret, White-throated kingfisher, Common Kingfisher, Grey-headed swamphen, Common Moorhen, White-breasted waterhen, Little Egret, Osprey, Little Cormorant, Asian openbill etc.

== See also ==
- List of lakes of Assam
