= Mer Beel =

Lake in Assam

- Interactive map of Mer Beel
- Location: Nagaon district, Assam, India
- Coordinates: 26°24′15.3″N 92°11′24.4″E

Mer Beel is a lake located in Nagaon district of Assam. The total area of Mer beel is 25 Hectare (ha).

== See also ==
List of lakes of Assam
