= Morikalang Beel =

Lake in Assam

- Morikalong Beel
- মৰিকলং বিল (Assamese)
- Location within Assam Location within India
- Interactive map of Morikalang Beel
- Location: Morigaon district, Assam, India
- Coordinates: 26°14′41.9″N 92°19′22.2″E

Morikalang Beel (also spelled as Morikalong or Marikalong) is a U-shaped lake located in Morigaon district of Assam. The lake is surrounded by the Raina Pathar village and Buhagaon village.

== Fisheries management ==
This lake regulates the water regime and is known for harvesting fish and other aquatic life.

== See also ==
- List of lakes of Assam
