= Beyond the Mast =

2026 Bangladeshi film

- Official poster
- Directed by: Mohammad Nuruzzaman
- Screenplay by: Mohammad Nuruzzaman
- Story by: Mohammad Nuruzzaman
- Produced by: Mohammad Nuruzzaman
- Starring: Fazlur Rahman Babu; Deepak Suman; Aminur Rahman
- Cinematography: Mohammed Arifuzzaman
- Edited by: Mohammad Nuruzzaman
- Music by: Mohammad Nuruzzaman (sound designer)
- Production company: CineMaker
- Release dates: 24 April 2025 (MIFF); 17 July 2026 (Bangladesh)
- Running time: 93 minutes
- Country: Bangladesh
- Language: Bengali

Beyond the Mast (also known as Mastul, Bengali: মাস্তুল) is a 2026 Bangladeshi drama film story, screeplay, editing, sound designer, produced and directed by Mohammad Nuruzzaman under the banner of CineMaker. The film stars Fazlur Rahman Babu, Deepak Suman, Aminur Rahman, Arif Hasan, Sikdar Mukit, Sifat Bonna and others.

The film received the 'Special Mention Award' for Best Film at the main competition section of the 47th Moscow International Film Festival in Russia and it also received the 'Best Artists Contribution Award' at the 18th Cheboksary International Film Festival in Russia.

== Cast ==
- Fazlur Rahman Babu as Maqbool
- Deepak Suman
- Aminur Rahman
- Arif Hasan as Noora
- Sikdar Mukit
- Sifat Bonna

== Release ==
The film was screened at the 47th Moscow International Film Festival on 24 April 2025. Following its screenings and critical recognition at various international film festivals, Mastul was released theatrically in Bangladesh on 17 July 2026. The film opened across five modern cinema halls in the country.

== Awards ==
Year	Award	Category	Result	Ref.
2025	Special Mention Awards at 47th Moscow International Film Festival	Best Film	Won	
2025	Best Artists Contribution Award at 18th Cheboksary International Film Festival	Best Film	Won	
2025	Best Humanitarian Film Award at Imagineindia International Film Festival	Best Film	Nominated	
