= List of wetlands of Assam =

Assam is one of India's most wetland-abundant states, with approximately 5,097 major wetlands and an additional 6,081 smaller wetlands collectively covering 9.74% of the state's total land area. Wetlands in Assam are locally known by a variety of names reflecting their character: beel, pitoni, doloni, jalah, doba, hola, gedeng, and haor. These ecosystems serve as repositories of rich biotic and abiotic resources while providing critical functions including flood control, stormwater regulation, and water quality improvement. Despite their ecological importance, urban wetlands in Assam face the highest rates of degradation compared to their rural counterparts. The Brahmaputra River basin strongly influences the hydrology of the state's wetlands, making them particularly sensitive to changes in land use patterns, monsoon variability, and the rapid urbanization occurring around Guwahati.

This is a list of lakes (beels) and wetlands of Assam, India.

== Tinsukia district ==
- Maguri Motapung Beel
- Udaipur Beel
- Rampur Beel

== Dibrugarh district ==
- Lomghori Beel
- Sasoni Merbeel
- Dihingerasuti Beel

Phuloni Beel Situated in Nakatani Phakum Gaon, Konwerpur, Sivasagar district

== Jorhat district ==
- Gorormaj Beel
- Borchola Beel

== Golaghat district ==
- Sankar Beel
- Nabeel Beel
- Goruchara Beel
- Galabeel
- Moridisoi

== Dhemaji district ==
- Hollodunga
- Somrajan (S)
- Sornrajan (N)
- Phutukabari
- Keshukhana
- Puwasaikia

== Lakhimpur district ==
- Bilmukh
- Morichampora

== Nagaon district ==
- Somrajan
- Mer Beel
- Sibasthan
- Samaguri Beel

== Morigaon district ==
- Charan Beel
- Morikalang Beel

== Sonitpur district ==
- Dighali Beel
- Kharoi Beel
- Goroimari Beel

== Darrang district ==
- Mailhata
- Bodhisichi
- Gathaia

== Kamrup district ==
- Chandubi Lake
- Dipor Bil
- Silsako Lake
- Mandira Beel
- Bageswari Beel
- Rongai Beel
- Dora Beel
- Selsela Beel
- Sorusola Beel
- Borsola Beel

== Goalpara district ==
- Tarnranga
- Urpad Beel

== Nalbari district ==
- Ghograjan
- Sothajan
- Morasaulkhowa

== Barpeta district ==
- Kapla Beel
- Chotkapla
- Tabha Beel
- Alpajan beel
- Chikanchara Beel
- Boira Beel, Kayakuchi
- Sorbhog Beel

== Gallery ==
Lakes of Assam
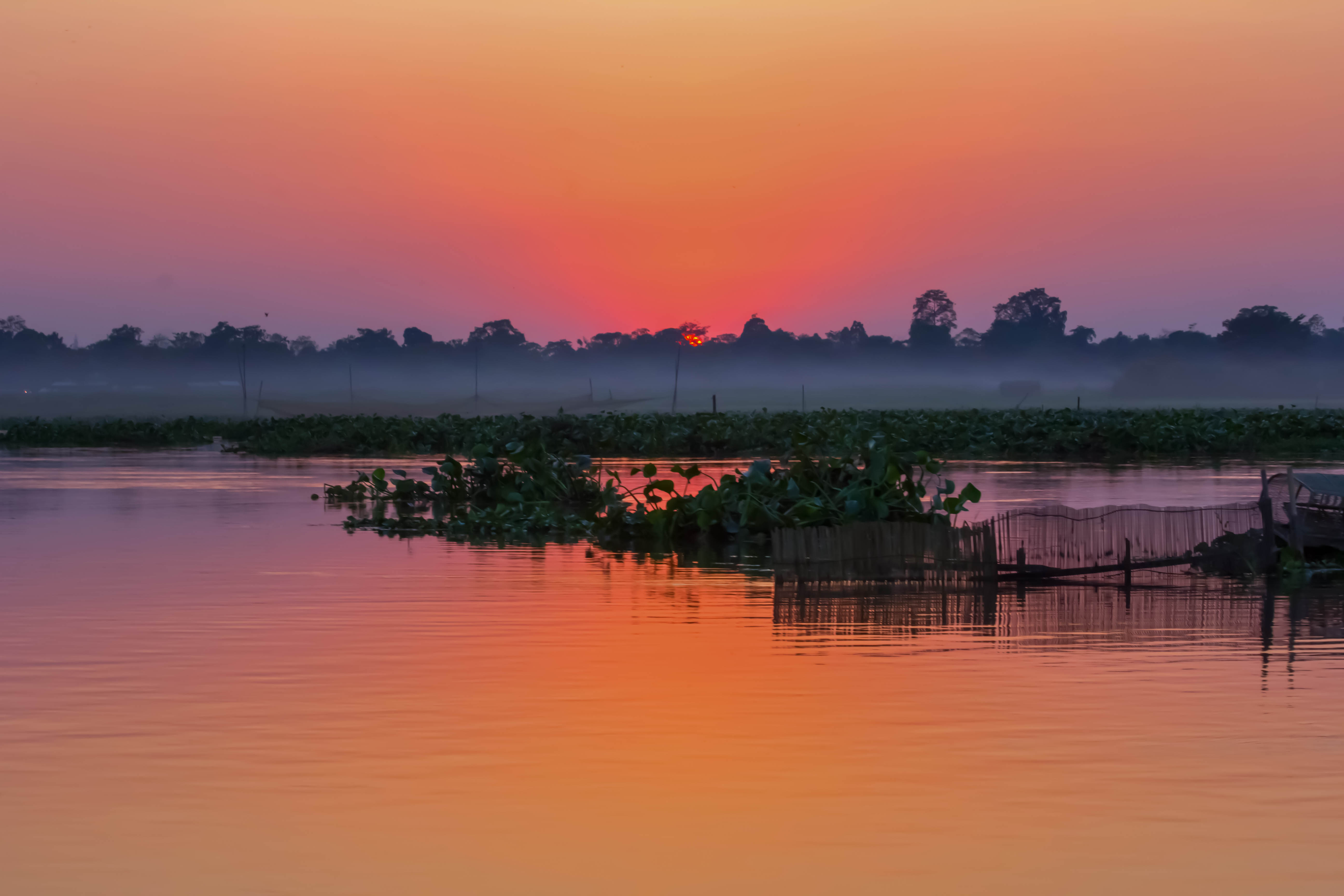
Maguri Motapung Beel in Tinsukia district

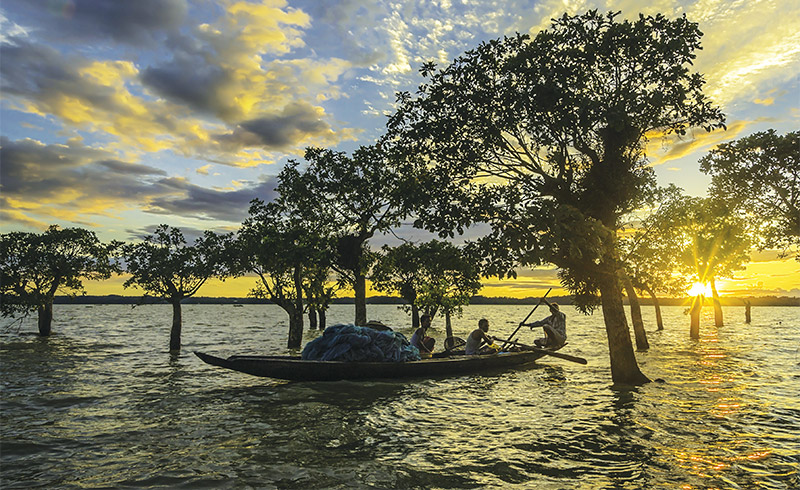
Son Beel in Karimganj district

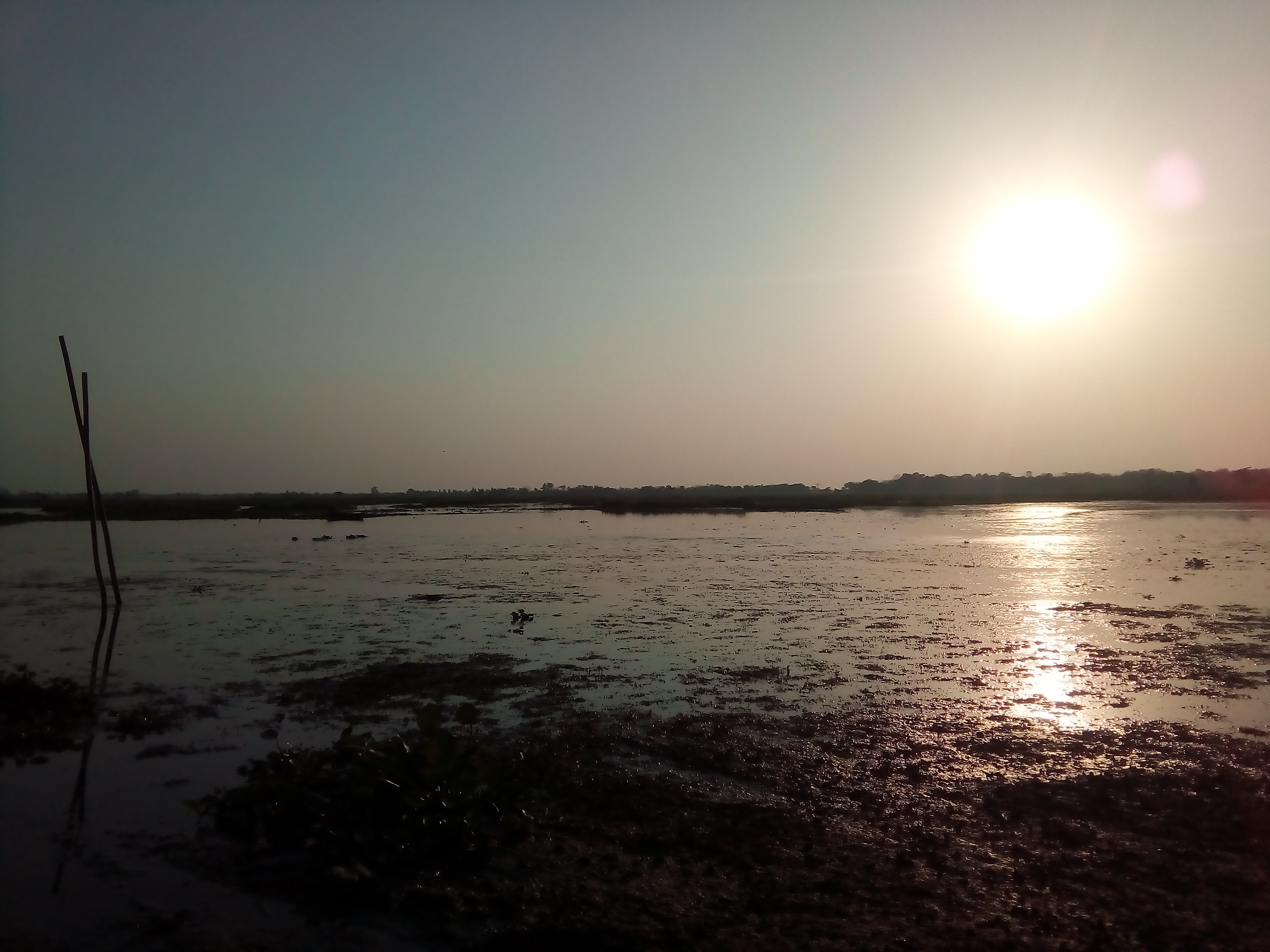
Sunset in the Kapla Beel in Barpeta district

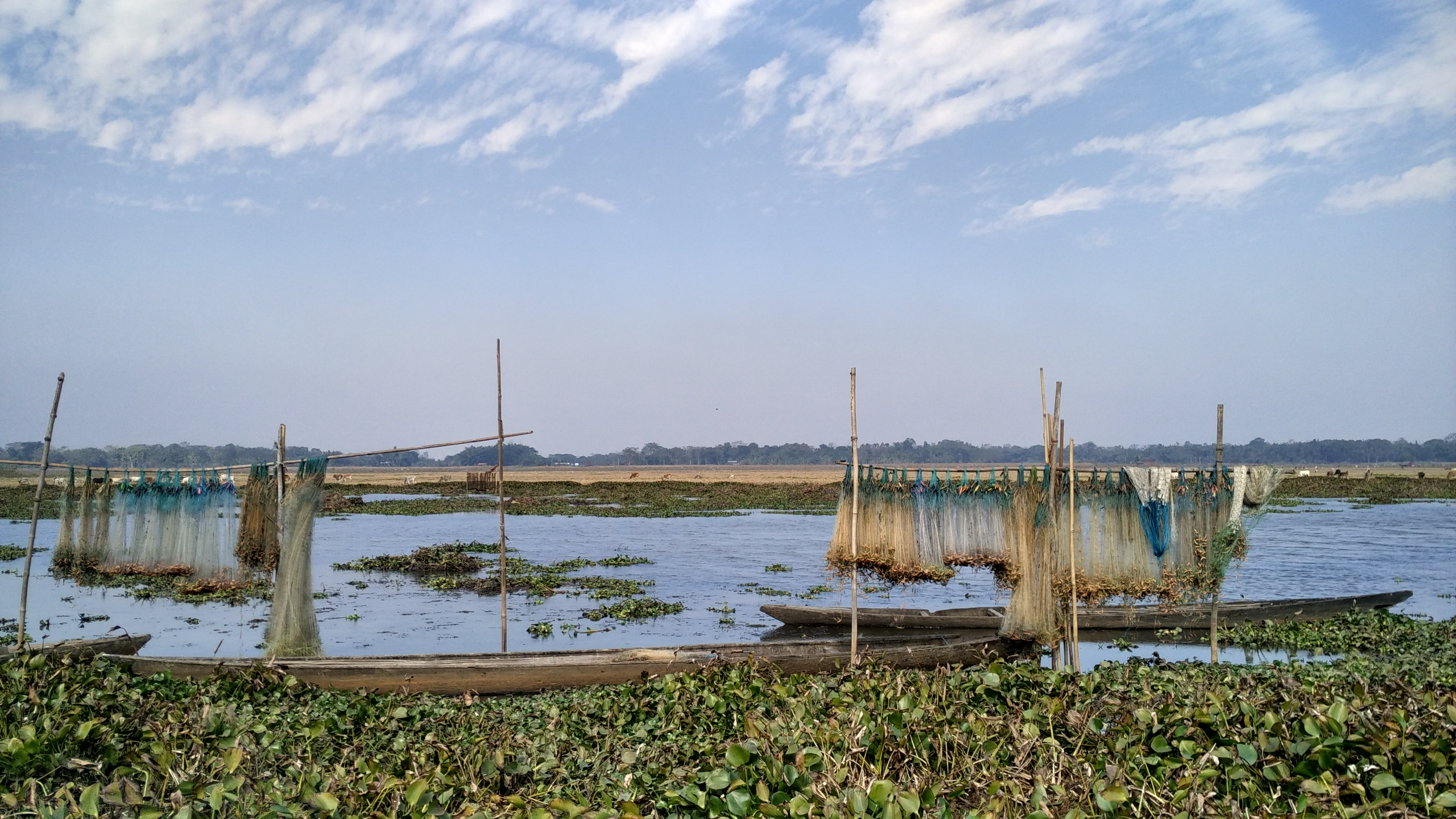
Fishing nets and boats on the Dora Beel in Kamrup district

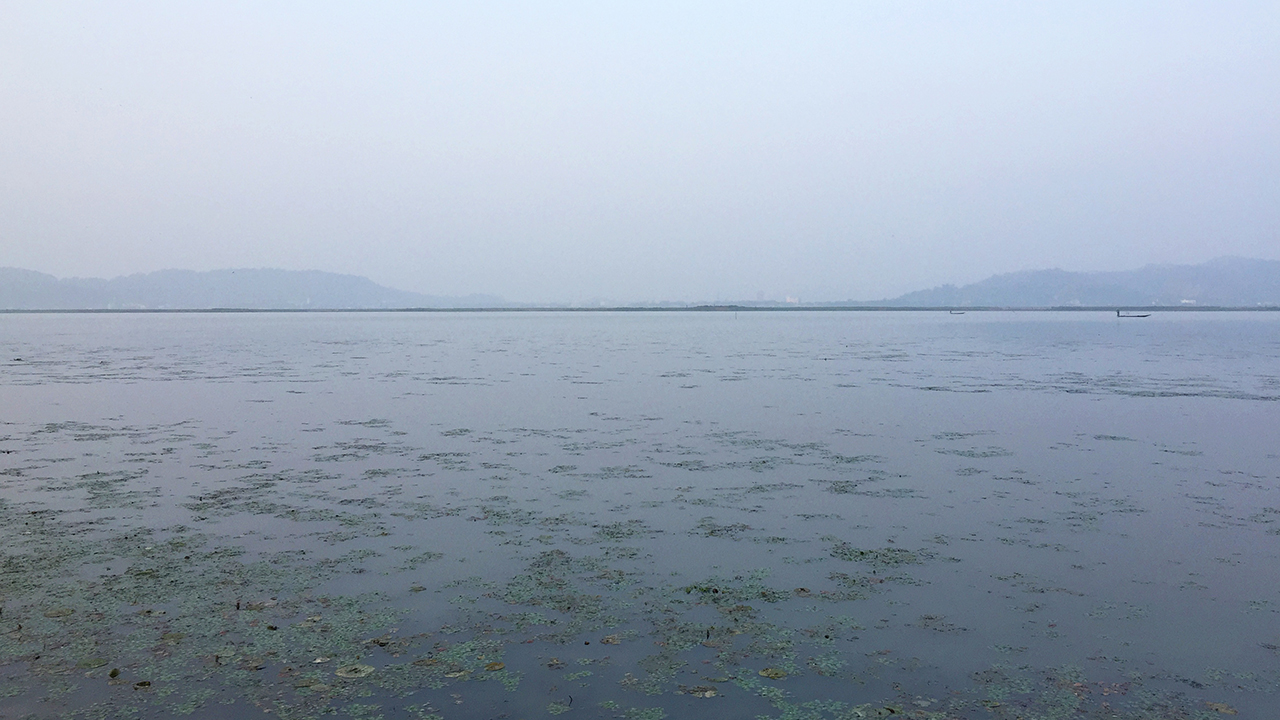
Dipor Bil in Guwahati

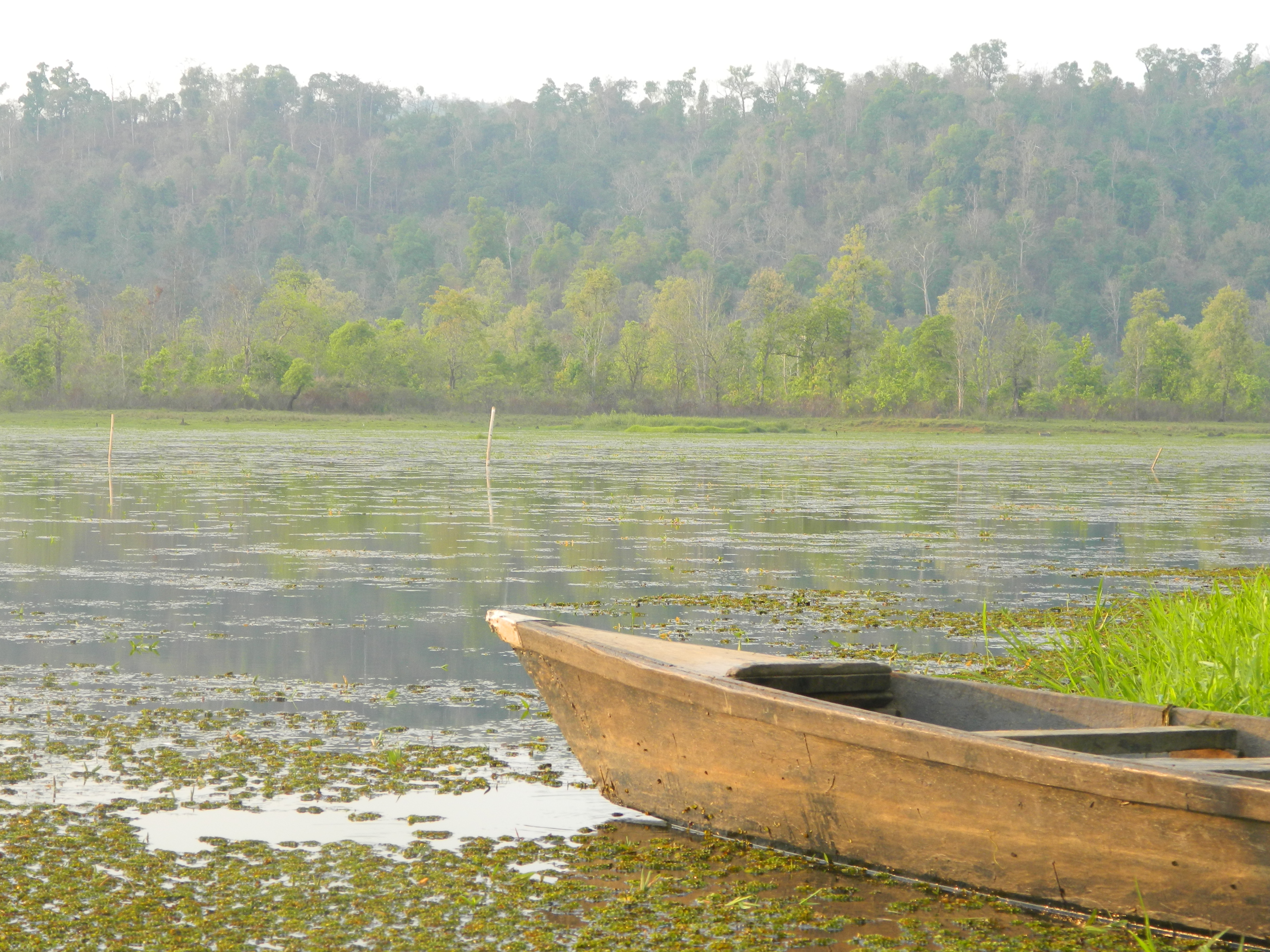
Chandubi Lake in Kamrup district

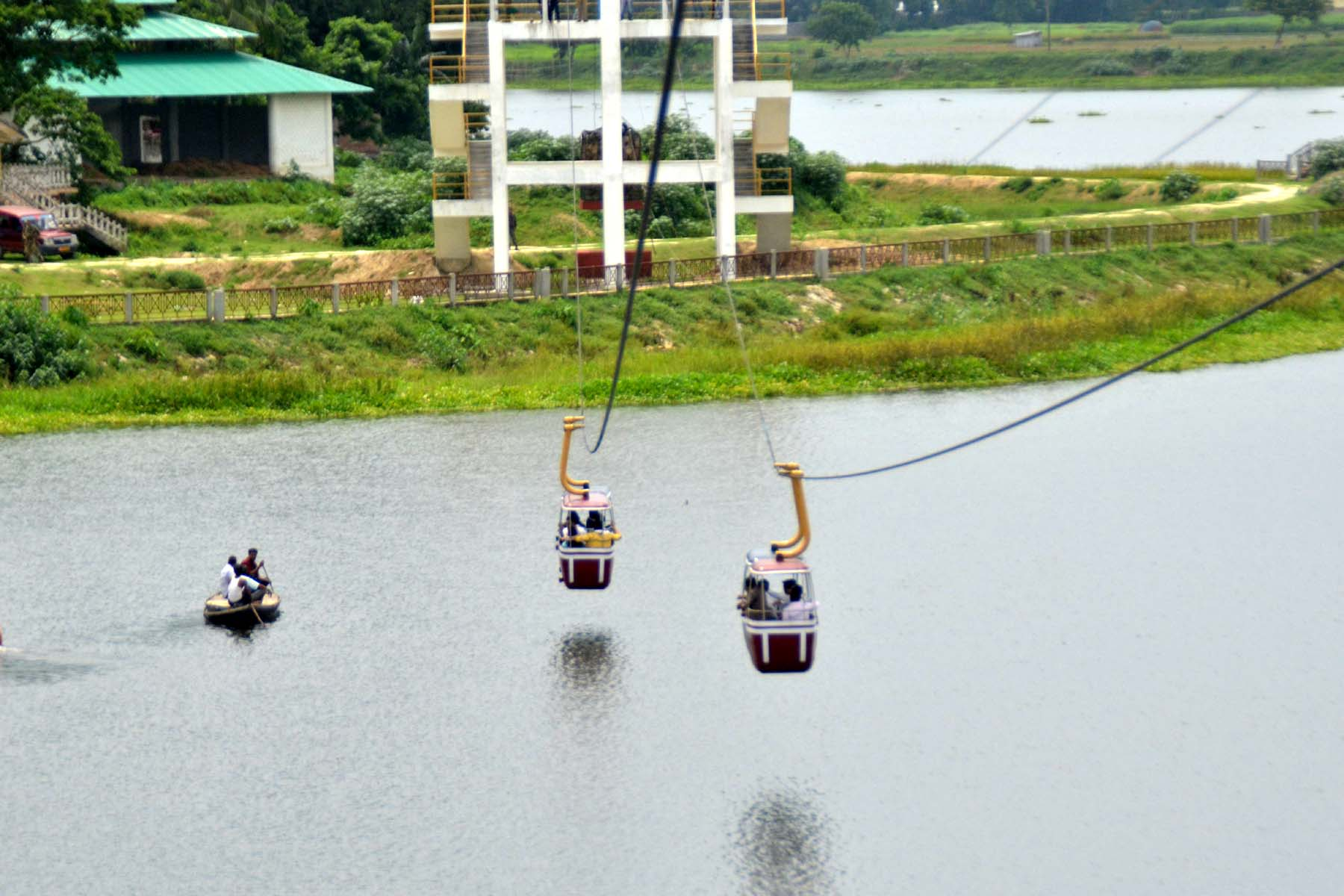
Ropeway at Samaguri Beel in Nagaon district

== See also ==
- List of lakes of India
