= Dora Beel =

Lake in Assam

- ডৰা বিল (Assamese)
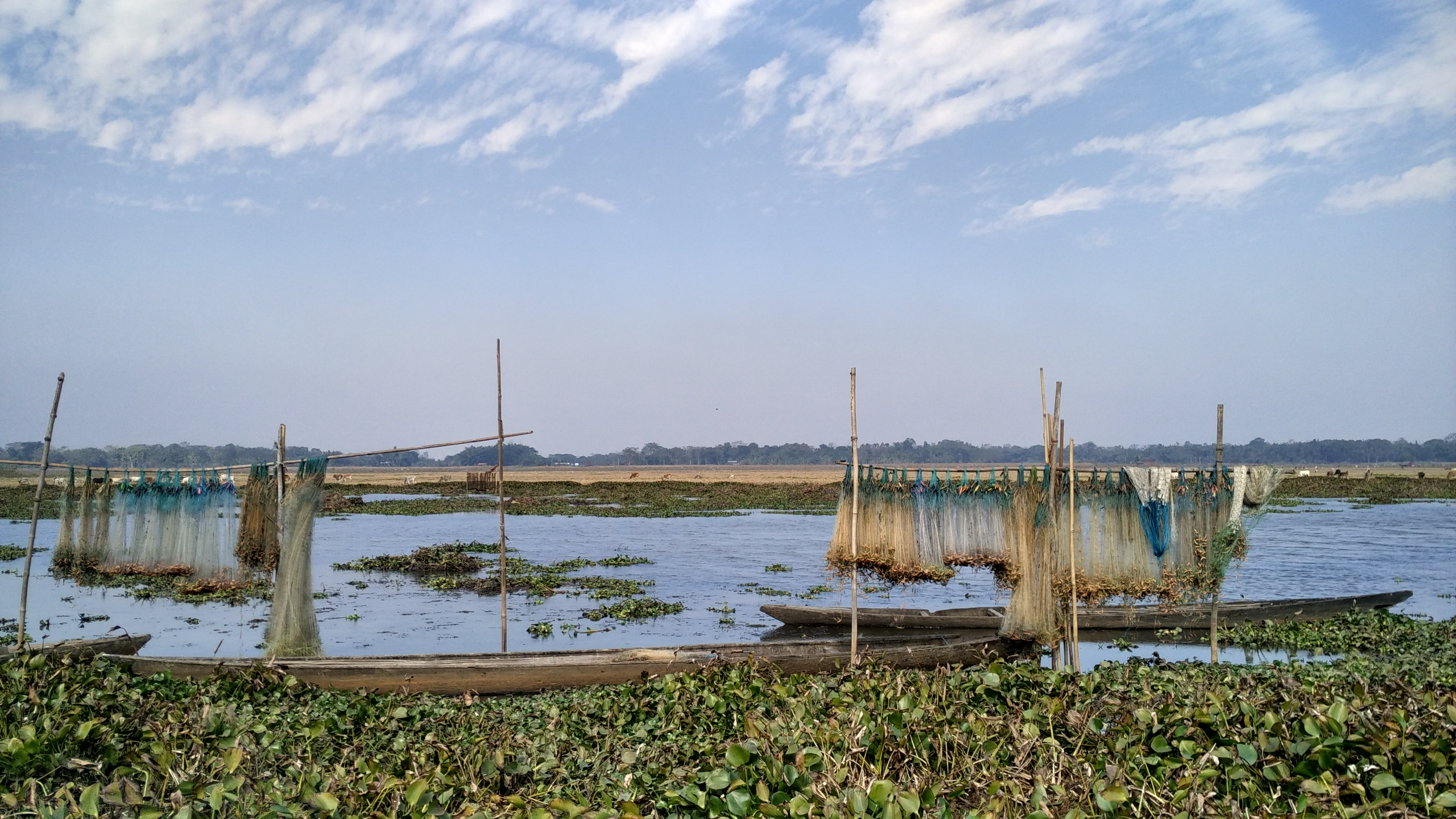
- Fishing nets and boats on the Dora Beel

- Location within Assam Location within India
- Location: Rampur No. 2 village, Kamrup district, Assam, India
- Coordinates: 26°05′19.9″N 91°27′31.9″E

Dora Beel is a wetland and lake located at Rampur no. 2 village under the Palashbari revenue circle and surrounded by villages like Rajapukhuri, Nahira, Bhakatpara, Tezpur, Rampur, Majpara, Kuldung, Dhantola, Bortari and Khidirpukhuri in Kamrup district of Assam. The local folks have referred to this area as “Beeldora” since ancient times. The floodplains extending from this land to Kulshi River serve as a home to over 230 species of local and migratory birds (Survey by Bonyabondhu). Among them is the Oriental Pratncole, a rare migratory bird species in Assam, which is regularly sighted in the Dorabeel area. In addition, this wetland and its grassy plains and water bodies provide a picturesque habitat for several threatened species such as the Himalayan Vulture, White-rumped Vulture, Cinereous Vulture, Greater Adjutant (Hargila), Black-necked Stork, Lesser Adjutant, Knob-billed Duck, Black-headed lbis. Golden Oriole, Curlew, bristled Grass bird, Black-faced Bunting, River Tern, and many more. It is also worth mentioned that India’s first folklorist and esteemed scholar Dr. Prafulladatta Goswami was inspired to pursue birdwatching in this very region, making him Assam’s first ornithologist. He published his book of ornithology in 1969.

== Area ==
According to the Survey of India, the total area of the Beel was 300.96 acres in 1971. However, it had shrunk to 278.41 acres according to land sat imagery in 2005.

== Water source ==
Dora Beel is fed by Kulsi River and Kulsi also acts as main inlet and outlet for the lake.

== Aquafauna ==
One particularly important mammal found in this wetland is the Ganges River Dolphin (locally named as- Xihu). Although the river Dolphin does not reside permanently in Dorabeel, during the peak monsoon season, river dolphins are often seen venturing into the inner parts of Dorabeel through its confluence. Moreover, various researchers and scientists have documented evidence of the Ganges River Dolphin breeding in the confluence of Kulshi River and DorabeelDora Beel is the habitat of endangered South Asian river dolphin (Platanista gangetica). This endangered dolphin breeds only in Subansiri River and Kulsi River of the entire Brahmaputra delta.

This wetland serves as a habitat and breeding ground for 74 species of fish, three species of turtles, more than 25 species of reptiles, and 75 species of butterflies.

A total of 42 species of aquatic plants have been identified in Dorabeel wetland . Among these, there are 26 species of ornamental plants, 7 species of medicinal plants, 6 species that can be used as organic fertilizer, and 3 species that can be used to produce household items.

== Festival ==
Dora Beel festival is an annual festival set on the banks of the Dora Beel to discuss about the production of indigenous fish species and this festival is fundamentally linked to nature and carries the eternal message of protecting and respecting nature.

== See also ==
- List of lakes of Assam
