= Jolsobi =

- Directed by: Jaicheng Jai Dohutia
- Written by: Jaicheng Jai Dohutia
- Produced by: Bhupali Moran Jaicheng Jai Dohutia
- Starring: Darathie Bhardwaj Numal Chandra Gogoi Dulukanta Moran Durlabha Moran
- Cinematography: Chida Bora Jaicheng Jai Dohutia
- Edited by: Jaicheng Jai Dohutia
- Music by: Saurav Mahanta Andreas Lucas
- Release dates: 26 October 2021 (Sao Paulo, Brazil)
- Running time: 87 minutes
- Country: India
- Language: Assamese

Jolsobi (End of Spring) is an Assamese language film directed and written by debutant independent filmmaker Jaicheng Jai Dohutia and produced by Mayamara Productions in association with Arman Productions, FunDeMental Studios and Mogador Film. The film is based on gender equality a massive issue and a worldwide injustice.

== Plot ==
Tapashi (Darathie Bharadwaj), a young college grad, the protagonist of the film tries to hold a job; she even tries to salvage her relationship with a man who doesn't feel the same way about her while attempting to make it big in a small village that restricts her and barely allows her freedom of choice but none of it is ever sufficient.

== Cast ==
- Darathie Bharadwaj
- Numal Chandra Gogoi
- Durlabha Moran
- Dulukanta Moran
- Akhil Bihiya Gogoi
- Biponjit Gogoi
- Karabi Dowarah
- Bishal Anurag
- Geetashree Dohutia
- Rashmi Rekha Dohutia

== Production ==
Jolsobi is an Indo-German production. It has been made by Mayamara Art & Culture in association with Mogador Film Berlin, Fundamental Studios Frankfurt and Arman Productions India. Dohutia wrote the script in 2020.

== Awards ==
Year	Award	Category	Result	Ref
2021	São Paulo International Film Festival	New Director's Competition	Nominated	
2022	Prag Cine Award	Best Screenplay Best Director Best Cinematography	Won	
