= Urpad Beel =

Lake in Assam

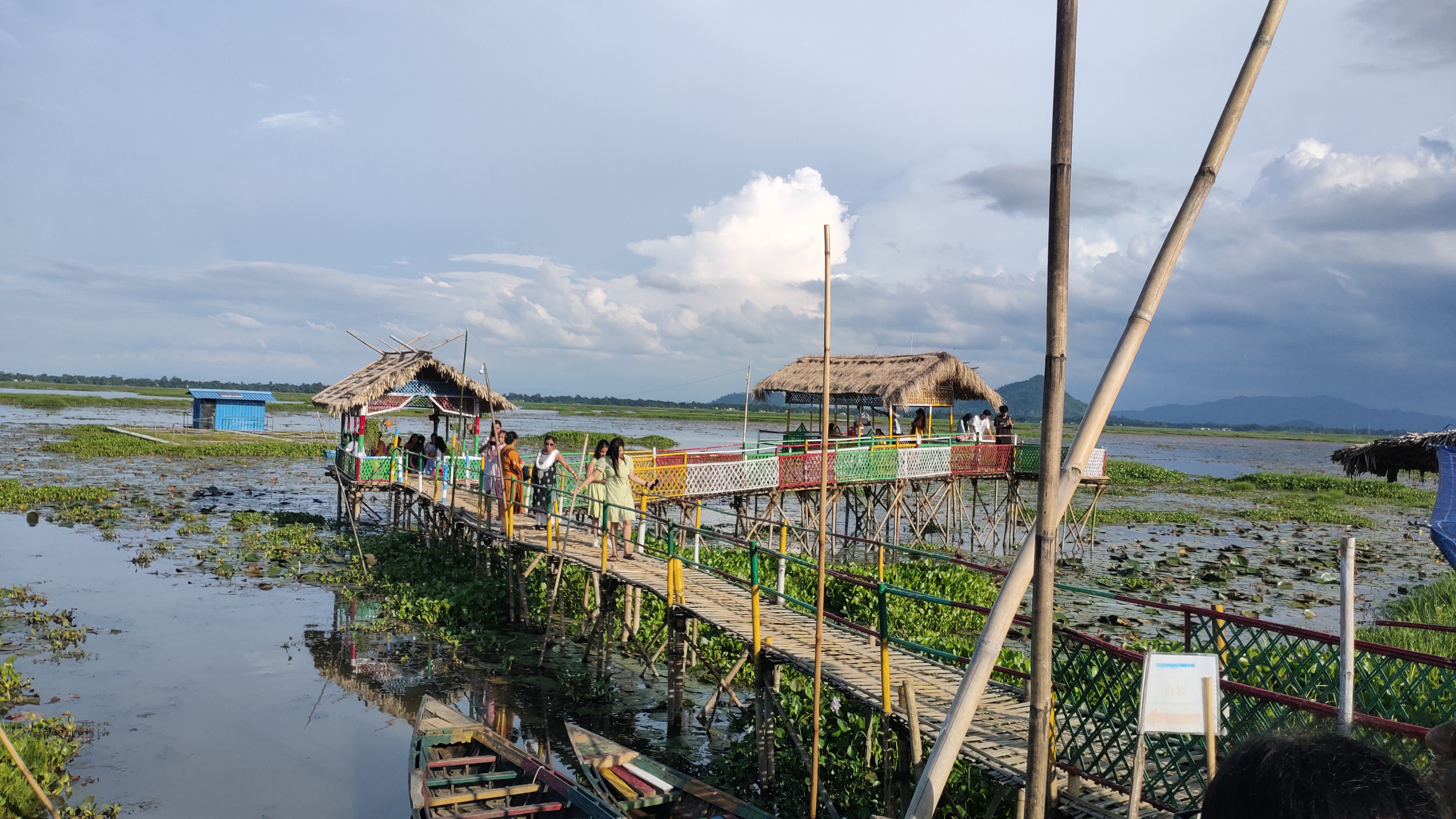
- Scenery at Urpad Beel Goalpara
- Interactive map of Urpad Beel
- Location: Agia village, Goalpara district, Assam, India
- Coordinates: 26°05′26.2″N 90°35′19.9″E

Urpad Beel is a natural lake located at Agia village in Goalpara district of Assam. This lake is situated 9 km away from Goalpara, the district headquarters of Goalpara district. Urpad Beel is one of the biggest natural lakes of Lower Assam.

== Aquafauna ==
Urpad Beel is a natural habitat to many varieties of fish and birds. The lake is an important habitat for Greater adjutant, Cotton Pigmy Goose, Baya Weavers, Lesser whistling duck and Kingfisher. This lake is also known for aquatic plants such as water lily and common water hyacinth.

== Preservation ==
On 24 February 2020, Assam Soil Conservation and Social Welfare Minister Pramila Rani Brahma laid the foundation stone of a project worth INR 1 crore to beautify the Urpad Beel. Urpad beel is notified as Proposed Reserved Forest on June, 2025 by the Government of Assam for an area of 1256.00 Ha.

== See also ==
- List of lakes of Assam
