= Kapla Beel =

Lake in Assam

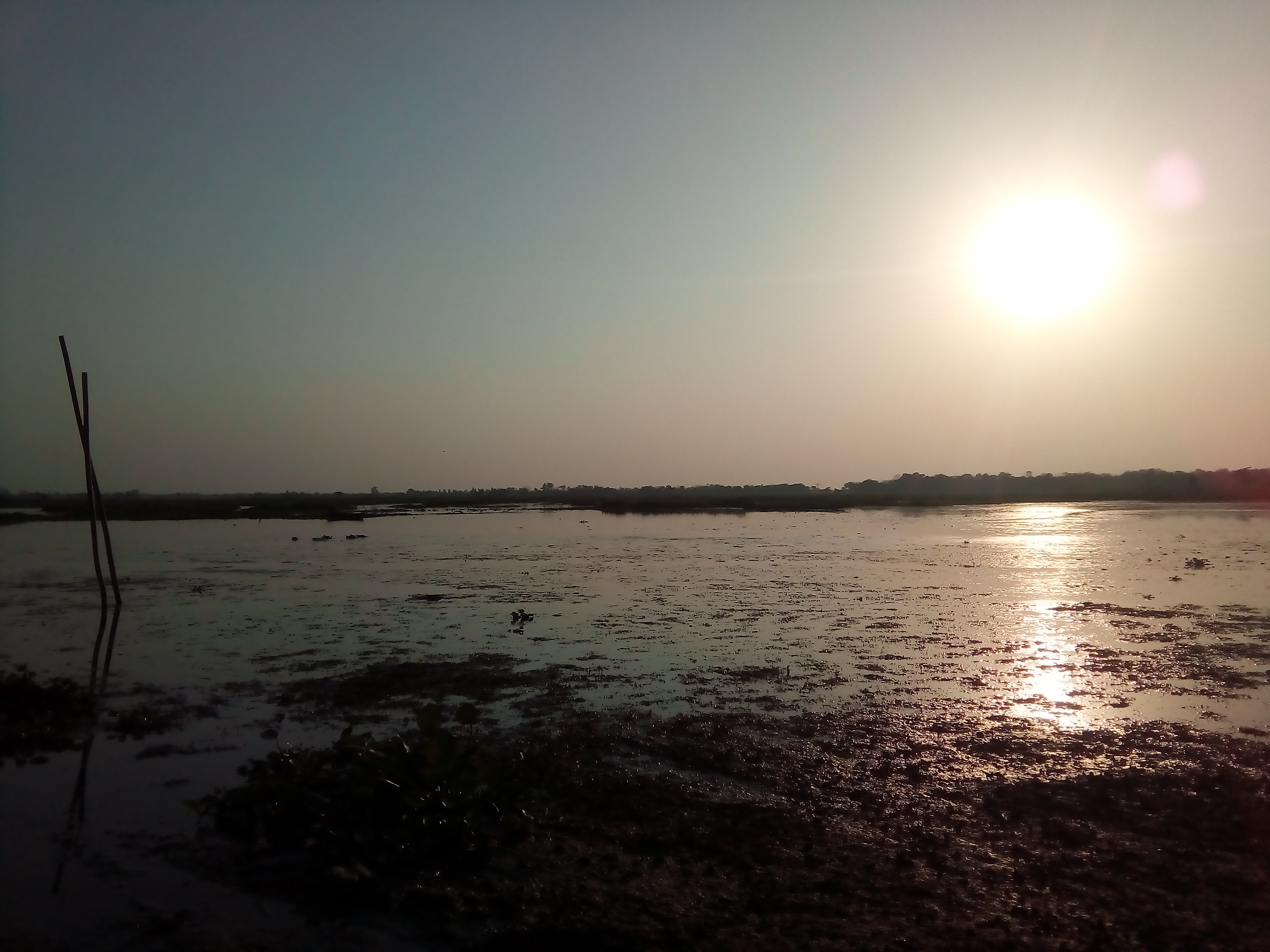
- Sunset in the Kapla Beel

- Location within Assam Location within India
- Interactive map of Kapla Beel
- Location: Near Purba Aladi, Barpeta district, Assam, India
- Coordinates: 26°20′13.8″N 91°13′26.9″E

Kapla Beel (also known as Kapla Bill and Kapla Bil) is a wetland and lake located towards the south of Baniyakuchi-Haladhibari under Sarthebari revenue circle in Barpeta district of Assam.

== Area ==
Total area of this lake is 25 ha.

== Aquafauna ==
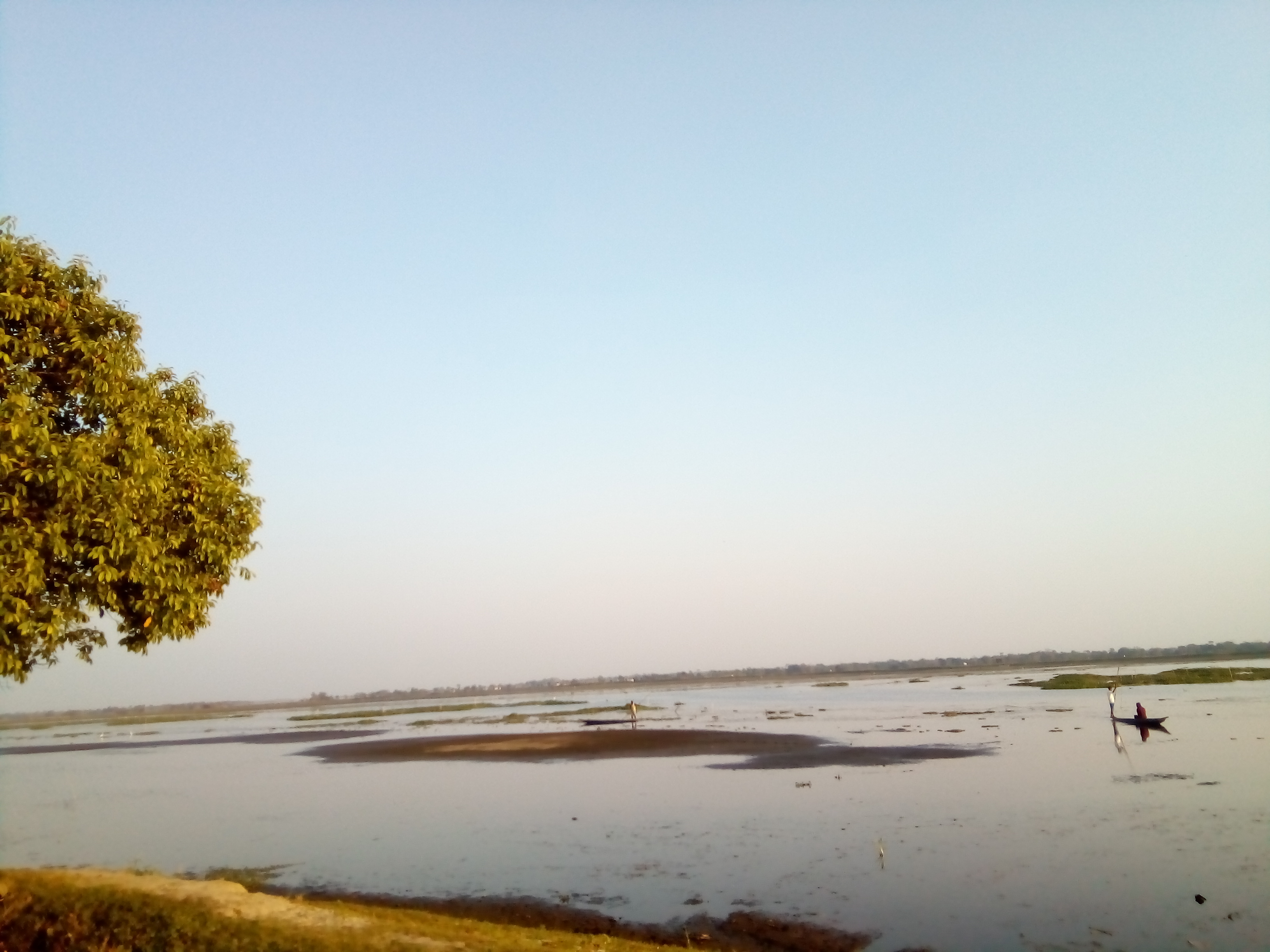
Fishing boats on the Kapla beel

This lake is the habitat of a number of species of indigenous fishes like Kawai (Anabas testudineus), Magur (Walking catfish), Singi (Heteropneustes fossilis), Sol (Snakehead murrel), Puthi (Olive barb), Khalihana (Trichogaster fasciata), Barali (Wallago attu) etc.

== See also ==
- List of lakes of Assam
