= Pradip Kurbah =

Indian film director

- Occupation: Film director
- Awards: National Film Awards (3 wins); Moscow International Film Festival (Best Director, Best Film)

Pradip Kurbah is an Indian film director. He has received three National Film Awards, and his 2025 film The Elysian Field won the Best Film and Best Director awards at the 47th Moscow International Film Festival.
