= Jafar Sadeghi =

Iranian documentary maker

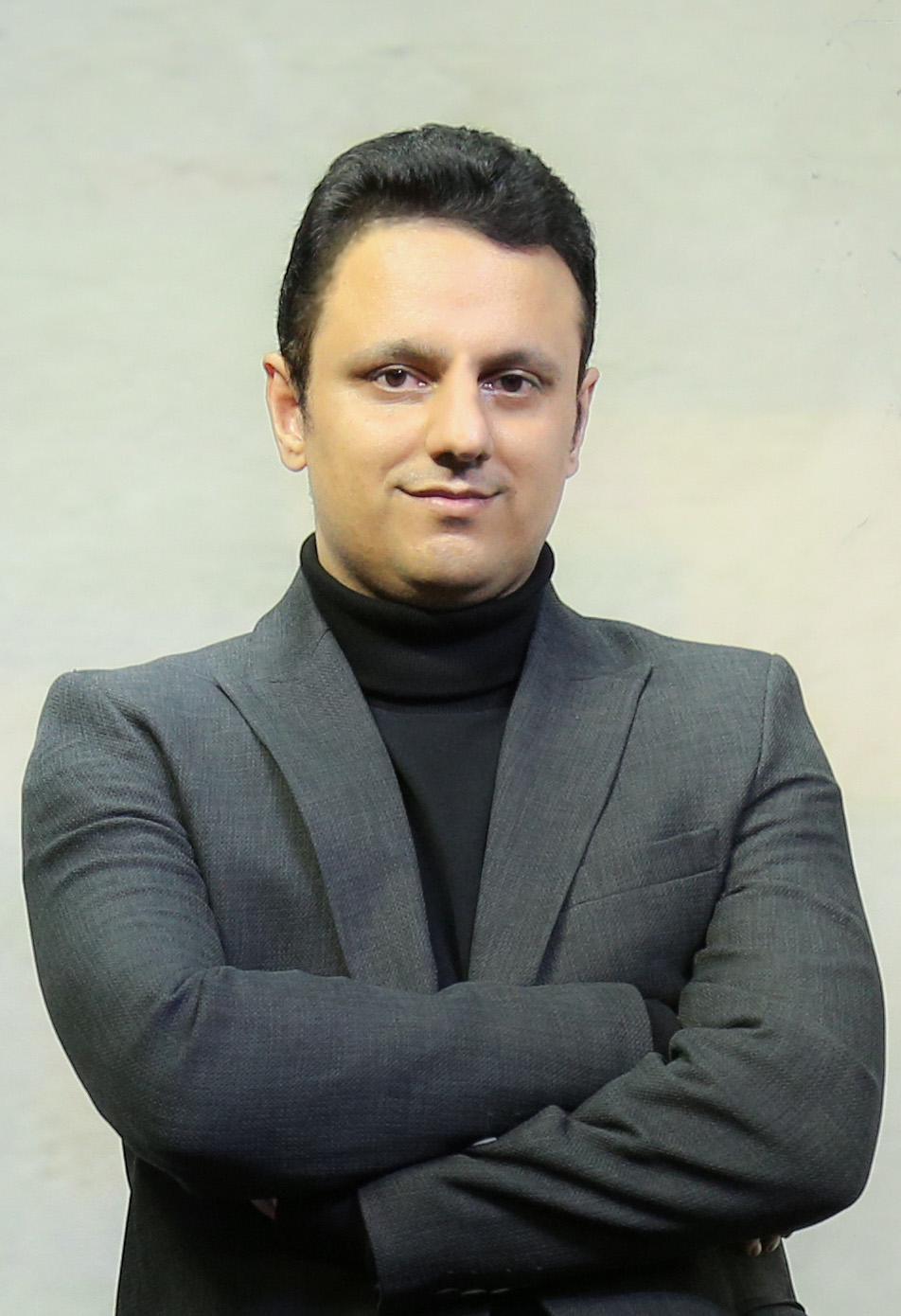
- Born: November 20, 1986 (age 39); Gorgan, Iran
- Occupations: Director, editor, writer
- Years active: 2017–present

Jafar Sadeghi (Persian: جعفر صادقی; born 20 November 1986) is a documentary filmmaker, writer, director and editor from Iran. His documentaries were screened in Iranian cinemas and at international film festivals.

== Early life and education ==
Sadeghi has a master's degree in civil engineering, and graduated from the Iranian Youth Cinema Society.

== Career ==
Jafar Sadeghi first became known in Iranian documentary cinema by making two documentaries about famous Iranian football figures, Farshad Pious and Hamid Alidoosti, but he has had significant activities in making documentaries with social issues.

After that, he moved on to other subjects. He made documentaries such as Trick and Kabouk, winning awards in Iranian cinema, including the Crystal Simorgh for Best Documentary from the Fajr Film Festival and several awards from festivals such as Cinema Verite.

Sadeghi has won many awards at Iranian and international festivals, including the Iran Documentary Festival and the Milan Festival.

He continues to produce documentary films, and has been working as a cinema instructor in the Iranian Youth Cinema Society since 2023, also an expert and critic in specialized Iran television documentary TV shows.

== Works of art ==
Name	Year	Role	Result	Festivals and awards
Farshad Aghaye Goal	2018	Director, writer, editor	Won	Special Jury Award, Documentary Festival 2018
Farshad Aghaye Goal	2018	Director, writer, editor	Nominated	Best Documentary Film of the Year, Iran, Hafez celebration 2019
Farshad Aghaye Goal	2018	Director, writer, editor	Nominated	Special Jury Award, IRAN Documentary Television Festival 2019
Farshad Aghaye Goal	2018	Director, writer, editor	Nominated	Best Audiences Film, IRAN Documentary Television Festival 2019
Farshad Aghaye Goal	2018	Director, writer, editor	Selected	Tehran International Sports Film Festival 2018
Hamid's Symphony	2022	Director, writer, editor	Won	Best Feature Documentary, Milan FICTS 2022
Hamid's Symphony	2022	Director, writer, editor	Won	Best Documentary Director, Tehran FICTS Festival 2022
Hamid's Symphony	2022	Director, writer, editor	Won	Best Documentary, Mehr Cinema Golestan 2022
Hamid's Symphony	2022	Director, writer, editor	Nominated	Best Documentary, Hafez Award 2023
Hamid's Symphony	2022	Director, writer, editor	Nominated	Best Feature Documentary, Tehran FICTS 2022
Hamid's Symphony	2022	Director, writer, editor	Nominated	Best Researcher Award, Tehran FICTS 2022
Hamid's Symphony	2022	Director, writer, editor	Selected	Documentary Film Festival of Iranian Cinema Verite 2021
Hamid's Symphony	2022	Director, writer, editor	Selected	Beausoleil Côte d'Azur International FICTS Festival 2024
Hamid's Symphony	2022	Director, writer, editor	Selected	International FICTS Festival Slovenia 2024
Andishe Club	2023	Director, writer, editor	Won	Special award for social documentary Ba Ham Vatan 2023
Andishe Club	2023	Director, writer, editor	Nominated	Best Audience Documentary, IRAN Documentary Television Festival 2023
Andishe Club	2023	Director, writer, editor	Selected	International FICTS Festival Milan Italy 2024
Andishe Club	2023	Director, writer, editor	Selected	International FICTS Festival Tehran 2024
Trick	2025	Director, writer, editor	Won	Best Documentary, 43rd Fajr Film Festival IRAN 2025
Trick	2025	Director, writer, editor	Won	Special Award, Documentary TV, Cinema Verite 2024
Trick	2025	Director, writer, editor	Won	Best Feature Documentary, Milan FICTS 2025
Trick	2025	Director, writer, editor	Nominated	Best Audience Documentary, Cinema Verite Festival 2024
Trick	2025	Director, writer, editor	Nominated	Best Sound, Cinema Verite Festival 2024
Trick	2025	Director, writer, editor	Selected	47th Moscow International Film Festival 2025
Trick	2025	Director, writer, editor	Selected	37th Girona International Film Festival 2025
Kabouk	2026	Director, writer, editor	Won	Best Audience Documentary,19th Cinema Verite Festival 2025
Kabouk	2026	Director, writer, editor	Nominated	Best Director, 19th Cinema Verite Festival 2025
Dream of Hoop City	2026	Director, writer, editor, researcher, cameraman	Won	Best Director, 9th IRAN DocTV Festival 2026
Dream of Hoop City	2026	Director, writer, editor, researcher, cameraman	Nominated	Best Researcher, 9th IRAN DocTV Festival 2026
Dream of Hoop City	2026	Director, writer, editor, researcher, cameraman	Nominated	Best Audience Film, 9th IRAN DocTV Festival 2026
Dream of Hoop City	2026	Director, writer, editor, researcher, cameraman	Nominated	Best Feature Documentary, 9th IRAN DocTV Festival 2026
Dream of Hoop City	2026	Director, writer, editor, researcher, cameraman	Nominated	Best Cimenatography, 9th IRAN DocTV Festival 2026

- Crystal Simorgh, Best Documentary Award in 43rd Fajr Film Festival IRAN 2025 for Trick
- Best Audience Award in 19th Cinema Verite 2025 for Kabouk
- Special jury Award, IRAN Documentary Television Festival 2019 for Farshad Aghaye Goal
- Mention d'Honneur, Sport Movies & TV - Milano International FICTS Fest 2022 for Hamid's Symphony
- Mention d'Honneur, Sport Movies & Tv - Milano International FICTS Fest 2025 for Trick
- Best Director award, Tehran International Sport Movies & TV Festival 2022 for Hamid's Symphony
- Special Award, Documentary TV, Cinema Verite 2024 for Trick
