= Baghjan =

Village in Assam, India

Baghjan Gaon Baghjan
- Village
- Baghjan Gaon
- Map of Assam Baghjan Gaon (India)
- Coordinates: 27.6002°N 95.4018°E
- Country: India
- State: Assam
- District: Tinsukia
- Subdivision: Doom Dooma

Area
  - Total: 533.84 ha (1,319.1 acres)
- Elevation: 124.99 m (410.1 ft)

Population (2011)
  - Total: 4,488
  - Density: 840.7/km^{2} (2,177/sq mi)

Languages
  - Official: Assamese
- Time zone: UTC+5:30 (IST)
- Postal code: 786151

Baghjan Gaon is a village under the Doom Dooma subdivision of the Tinsukia district in Assam, India. As per the 2011 Census of India, Baghjan Gaon has a total population of 4,488 people including 2,244 males and 2,244 females.

On 27 May 2020, an accidental gas blowout happened in Oil India Limited's Baghjan Oilfield, near Baghjan Gaon, which killed 3 people and injured 3 foreign experts, and damaged a vast area including Baghjan and nearby villages and forests. It took six months to control the accidental gas blowout.

Baghjan also carries a history of militancy affected areas.
