= Dibru-Saikhowa National Park =

National park in India

- Dibru-Saikhowa Biosphere Reserve
- IUCN category II (national park)
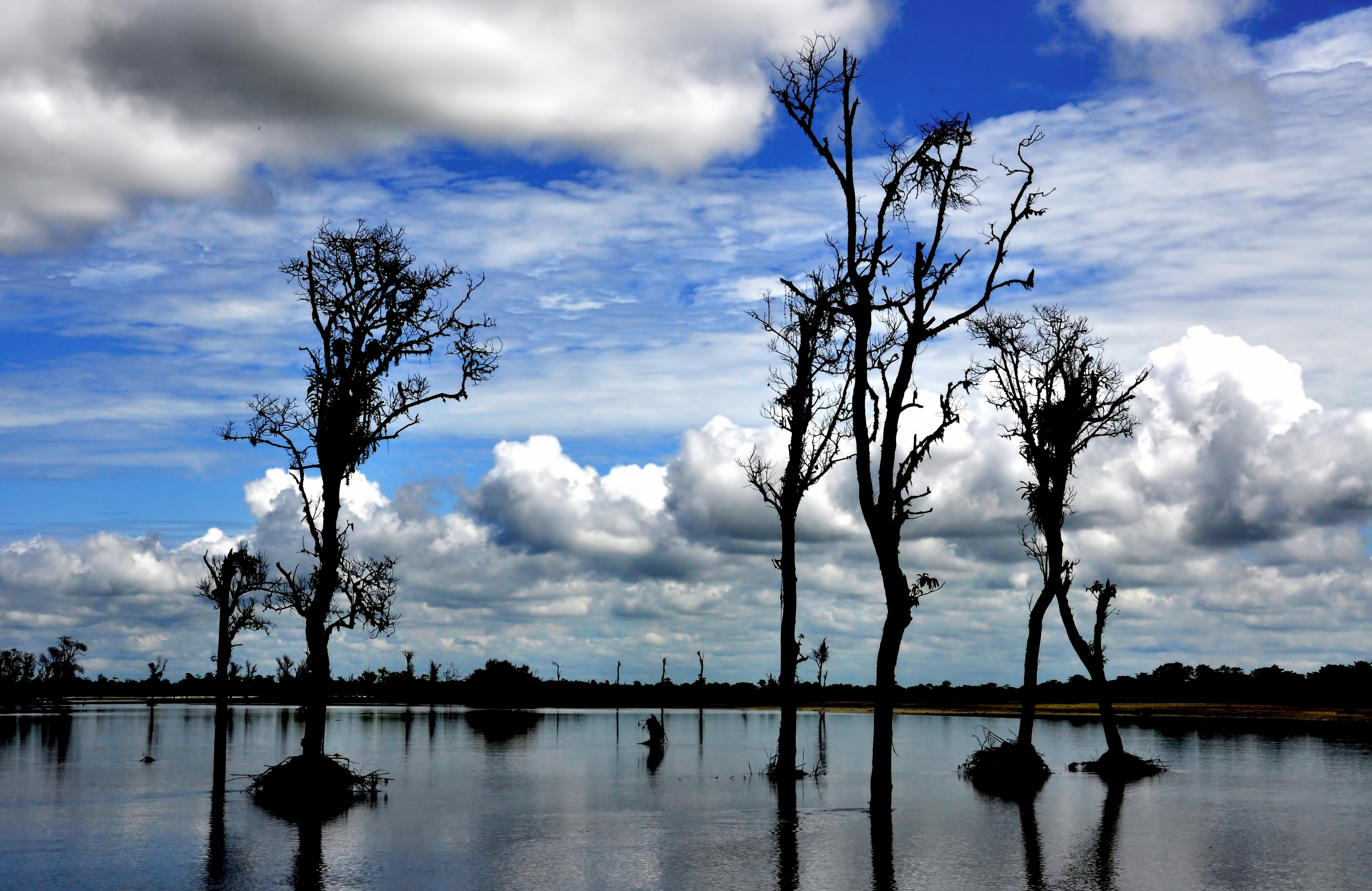

- Location within Assam Location within India
- Interactive map of Dibru-Saikhowa National Park
- Location: Assam, India
- Nearest city: Tinsukia
- Coordinates: 27°40′N 95°23′E
- Area: 350 km^{2} (140 sq mi)
- Established: 1999

Dibru-Saikhowa National Park is a national park in Dibrugarh and Tinsukia districts, Assam, India. It was designated a Biosphere Reserve in July 1997 with an area of 765 km^{2} (295 sq mi), including a core area of 340 km^{2} (130 sq mi) and a buffer zone of 425 km^{2} (164 sq mi).

It is located at an average elevation of 118 m (387 ft), ranging from 110 to 126 m (361 to 413 ft). The park is bounded by the Brahmaputra and Lohit Rivers in the north and Dibru River in the south. It mainly consists of moist mixed semi-evergreen forests, moist mixed deciduous forests, canebrakes and grasslands. It is the largest salix swamp forest in north-eastern India, with a tropical monsoon climate with a hot and wet summer and cool and usually dry winter. Annual rainfall ranges from 2,300 to 3,800 mm (91 to 150 in). It is a haven for many endangered species and rich in fish diversity.

== History ==
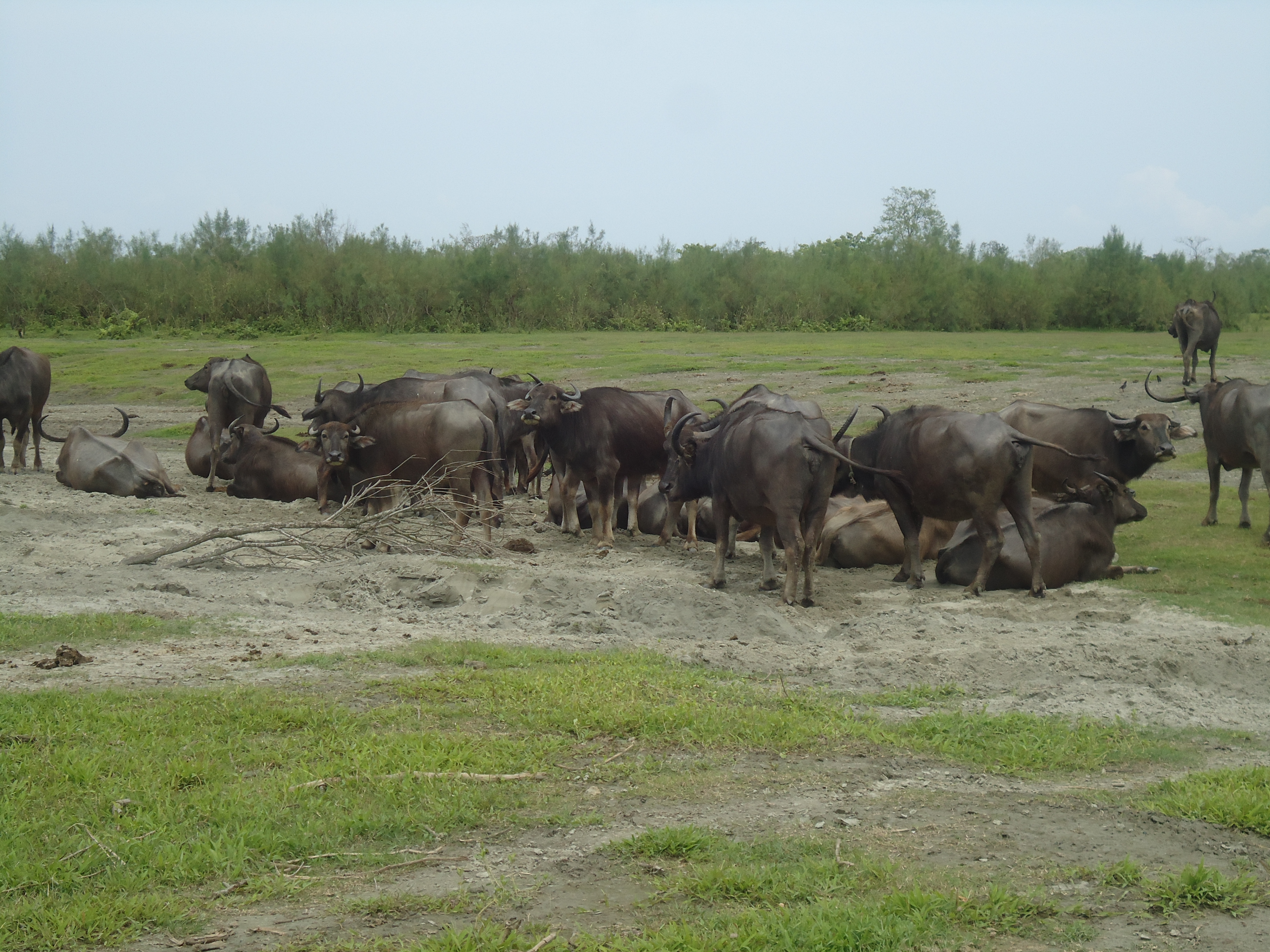
Wild water buffalo

The area was declared as Dibru Reserved Forest in 1890. In 1920, additional area was added to the Dibru Reserve Forest. In 1929, Saikhowa Reserve Forest was declared. In 1933, more area was added to the Dibru Reserved Forest. In 1986, an area of 650 km^{2} (250 sq mi) was preliminarily declared as a wildlife sanctuary, out of which 340 km^{2} (130 sq mi) was finally declared as wildlife sanctuary in 1995. In 1997, Dibru-Saikhowa Biosphere Reserve was declared with an area of 765 km^{2} (295 sq mi) including a core area of 340 km^{2} (130 sq mi). In 1999, the core area was declared as national park. In December 2020, Gauhati highcourt stayed a permission given to Oil India Limited for hydrocarbon exploration at seven locations inside the protected area.

== Biodiversity ==
=== Flora ===
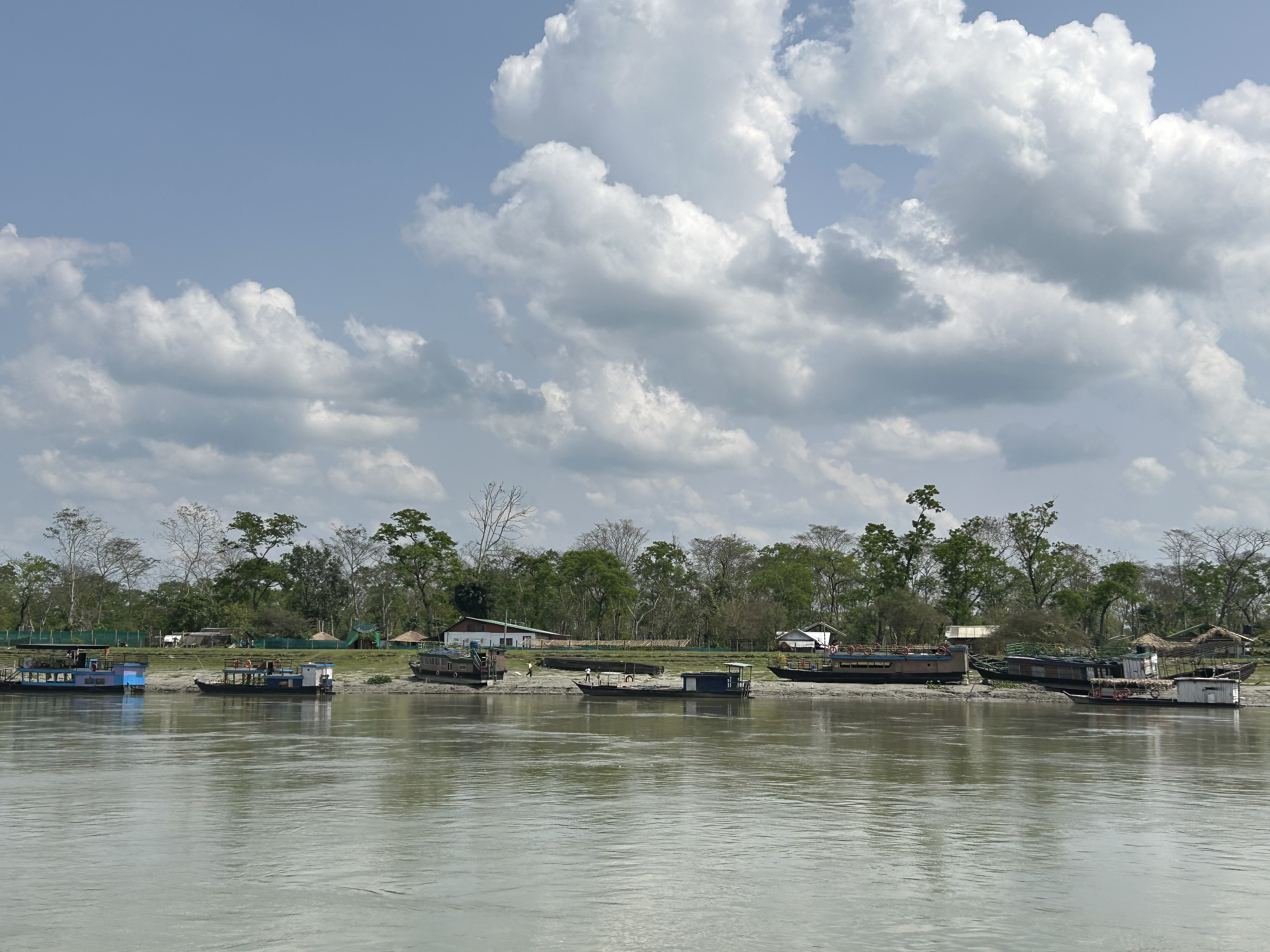
Boats near Dibru-Saikhowa National Park

The forest of Dibru-Saikhowa consists of semi-evergreen forests, deciduous, littoral and swamp forests and patches of wet evergreen forests. The national park is about 35.84% moist mixed forest, 9.50% degraded forest and 21.25% grassland. Major tree species of the area are tetrasperma, Dillenia indica, Bischofia javanica, Bombax ceiba, Lagerstroemia parviflora, Terminalia myriocarpa, Mesua ferrea, Dalbergia sissoo, and Ficus. Arundo donax, Imperata cylindrica, Phragmites karka, Saccharum ravennae are principal types of grasses in the national park. The orchid flora comprises 35 epiphytic and eight terrestrial species.

=== Fauna ===
Thirty-six mammal species have been recorded, of which 12 are listed in Schedule 1 of the Wildlife (Protection) Act of 1972. These include Bengal tiger, Indian leopard, clouded leopard, jungle cat, sloth bear, dhole, small Indian civet, Malayan giant squirrel, Chinese pangolin, Ganges dolphin, slow loris, pig tailed macaque, Assamese macaque, rhesus macaque, capped langur, Hoolock gibbon, Asian elephant, wild boar, Sambar deer, hog deer, barking deer and wild water buffalo. The feral horses living in the park are descendants of army horses let loose after the end of World War II.

Birds recorded include swamp francolin, spot-billed pelican, white-bellied heron, grey heron, purple heron, black-crowned night heron, yellow bittern, Asian openbill, lesser adjutant, white-necked stork, black stork, black-necked stork, glossy ibis, fulvous whistling-duck, bar-headed goose, greylag goose, northern pintail, common shelduck, white-winged wood duck, Indian spot-billed duck, Baer's pochard, white-tailed eagle, Pallas's fish eagle, grey-headed fish eagle, greater spotted eagle, Himalayan griffon, white-backed vulture, slender-billed vulture, osprey, crested serpent-eagle, lesser kestrel, Sarus crane, Bengal florican, brown fish owl, great pied hornbill, spotted redshank, greenshank, and pale-capped pigeon, greater adjutant, ferruginous pochard, Jerdon's babbler, black-breasted parrotbill, marsh babbler, puff-throated babbler, Jerdon's bushchat, Indian grassbird and chestnut-crowned bush warbler.

== See also ==
- Indian Council of Forestry Research and Education
