= Oil and gas industry in India =

The petroleum industry in India dates back to 1889 when the first oil deposits in the country were discovered near the town of Digboi in the state of Assam. The natural gas industry in India began in the 1960s with the discovery of gas fields in Assam and Maharashtra (Mumbai High Field). As of 31 March 2018, India had estimated crude oil reserves of 594.49 million metric tonnes (Mt) and natural gas reserves of 1339.57 billion cubic metres of natural gas (BCM).

India imports 82% of its oil needs and aims to bring that down by replacing it with local hydrocarbon exploration, renewable energy and indigenous ethanol fuel. India was the second top net crude oil (including crude oil products) importer of 205.3 Mt in 2019. Meanwhile, India’s refining capacity has steadily increased over the years, rising from 215.1 million metric tonnes per annum (MMTPA) to reaching 258.1 MMTPA as of FY25.

By March 2021, India's domestic crude oil production output fell by 5.2% and natural gas production by 8.1% in the FY21 as producers extracted 30.4917 Mt of crude oil and 28.67 BCM of natural gas in the fiscal year. In August 2021, crude oil production decreased by 2.3%, but there was a 20.23% increase in homegrown natural gas.

India offers US$ 12 per MMBTU whereas natural gas exploration and production cost is capped at $3 in many markets. Oil recovery is still only 30–35 per cent in India whereas state of the art technology can double it.

== History ==
The first oil deposits in India were discovered in 1889 near the town of Digboi in the state of Assam.

The natural gas industry in India began in the 1960s with the discovery of gas fields in Assam and Gujarat. Natural gas gained further significance after the discovery of large reserves in the South Basin fields by ONGC in the 1970s.

== Reserves ==
As of 1 April 2021, India had estimated crude oil reserves of 587.335 Mt, decreasing by 2.65% from the previous year. The largest reserves are found in the Western Offshore (37%) and Assam (27%). The estimated reserves of natural gas in India as of 1 April 2021 was 1,372.62 BCM, increasing by 0.52% from the previous year. The largest reserves of natural gas are located in the Eastern Offshore (40.6%) and the Western Offshore (23.7%).

=== Distribution of reserves by state/region ===
The following table shows the estimated crude petroleum and natural gas reserves in India by state/region as on 31 March 2017.

Region	Crude oil reserves (Mt)	Share of oil (%)	Natural gas reserves (BCM)	Share of gas (%)
Arunachal Pradesh	1.52	0.25	0.93	0.07
Andhra Pradesh	8.15	1.35	48.31	3.75
Assam	159.96	26.48	158.57	12.29
Coal Bed Methane	0	0	106.58	8.26
Eastern Offshore (Note: Includes joint ventures/private parties for Crude Oil and includes West Bengal for Natural Gas)	40.67	6.73	507.76	39.37
Gujarat	118.61	19.63	62.28	4.83
Nagaland	2.38	0.39	0.09	0.01
Rajasthan	24.55	4.06	34.86	2.70
Tamil Nadu	9.00	1.49	31.98	2.48
Tripura	0.07	0.01	36.10	2.80
Western Offshore (Note: Includes Bombay High offshore, Rajasthan and joint venture companies for Crude Oil, and Bombay High offshore, Rajasthan and Madhya Pradesh for Natural Gas)	239.20	39.60	302.35	23.44
Total	604.10	100	1,289.81	100

=== Strategic petroleum reserves ===
Building petroleum reserves like underground tank storage, above-ground tank storage, and fully developed and ready-to-exploit in situ reserves is a lucrative proposition for an oil-importing country like India, as the oil exporters charge exorbitant prices when the oil demand is little more than supply. The Indian Strategic Petroleum Reserve (SPR) is an emergency fuel store of total 5 Mt or 250 million barrels (40 million cubic metres) of strategic crude oil enough to provide 70 days of consumption, which are maintained by the Indian Strategic Petroleum Reserves Limited. Strategic crude oil storages are at 3 underground locations in Mangalore, Visakhapatnam and Padur, Udupi district, Karnataka with ready access to the refineries on the east and west coasts. Another method to build up strategic petroleum reserve at low cost is to develop a proven oil field for a higher oil extraction rate and keeping it reserved for full production on an intermittent basis when the global oil price crosses a set upper limit.

Two more SPRs will add strategic petroleum reserves of 12 days in addition to 10 days of reserves achieved in Phase I. These SPRs under Phase II will be located at Chandikhol in Odisha and Padur in Karnataka. Indian refiners maintain 65 days of crude storage, and when added to the SPR storage planned and achieved, it takes the Indian crude storage tally to 87 days. This is very close to the storage of 90 days mandated by IEA for member countries. The total storage figure is excluding the storage capacity of petroleum products with the marketing agencies and bulk consumers. India is also considering storing oil in other countries.

== Production ==
India's domestic crude oil and natural gas production has declined steadily since 2011–12. India produced 30.49 Mt of crude petroleum in 2020–21, declining by 5.21% over the previous fiscal. The production of natural gas was 28.67 BCM in 2020–21, declining by 8.05% over the previous year. Production of crude oil and natural gas declined by a compound annual growth rate (CAGR) of 2.44% and 5.47% respectively over the previous decade.

India also produces petroleum products and produced 233.51 Mt in 2020–21, a decline of 11.19% over the previous year. Among petroleum products, high speed diesel oil accounted for 43%, followed by motor gasoline (15%). Production of petroleum products grew by a CAGR of 1.56% over the previous decade.

ONGC is developing the KG-DWN-98/2 block in Krishna Godavari basin with capital expenditures of about US $5.07 billion (approximately INR 340 billion) leading to oil production from the field to the extent of 25 million tons and 45 billion m^{3} natural gas . The capex works out to nearly US$11 per barrel of oil equivalent (BOE) only for the total production of oil and gas. ONGC already has proved oil and gas reserves to the extent of 462.12 MMTOE at very low capex comparable with that of OPEC countries. Oil fields in Rajasthan state are emerging as a major oil and gas producer. In 2021, Reliance BP also started production from Krishna Godavari basin gas fields substantially enhancing the indigenous gas production.

India has deployed 159 rigs and drilled 545 production wells during 2017-18 which stands globally fifth but the oil and gas production is not commensurate with the wells drilled. India has planned to produce 15 Mt/year of compressed biogas (CBG), a carbon neutral fuel, by 2023. CBG replaces the CNG which is imported in the form of LNG.

Gasification of Char/Coal

Gasification of coal or lignite or pet coke or biomass produces synthesis gas or syngas (also known as coal gas or wood gas) which is a mixture of hydrogen, carbon monoxide and carbon dioxide gases. Coal gas can be converted into synthetic natural gas by using the Fischer–Tropsch process at low pressure and high temperature. Coal gas can also be produced by underground coal gasification if the coal deposits are located deep in the ground or it is uneconomical to mine the coal. Synthetic natural gas production technologies promise to dramatically improve India's supply of natural gas. Many coal-based fertiliser plants can also be economically retrofitted to produce synthetic natural gas. It is estimated that the production cost for syngas could be below US$6 per million British thermal units ($20/MWh).

The abundantly available coal in India is low rank coal which is not suitable for coal gasification without blending with pet coke. However, low rank coal/lignite can be converted into SNG by using hydrogen.

== Petroleum refining ==
As on 31 March 2021, there were 23 crude oil refineries in India, of which 18 were state-owned, 3 were privately owned and 2 were joint ventures. The total oil refining capacity in India stood at 248.87 Mt per year, remaining unchanged from the previous year. India has developed a strong petroleum refining industry supported by both public and private sector investments. The country’s refineries produce key petroleum products such as gasoline, diesel, LPG, and aviation fuel to meet growing domestic and export demand. Refineries in India processed 221.37 Mt of oil in 2020-21 achieving a capacity utilization of 88.8%. With a total refining capacity of 69.23 million metric ton per year, the state-owned Indian Oil Corporation was the largest refiner in the country by capacity. Indian Oil's refineries processed 62.35 Mt of crude oil in 2020–21.

Many refineries are using the lower end residual oil with higher sulphur content to produce more lighter oils (petrol, diesel, etc.) by installing petroleum coker units. This process generates a solid fuel called Pet coke which has higher calorific value and sulphur. As developed countries have banned use of high sulphur pet coke and residual oils, these fuels further are converted in to synthetic natural gas and methanol in Methanation plants to avoid their disposal problem. Nearly 38% of residual fuel oils are consumed in the shipping sector. The International Convention for Prevention of Pollution from Ships (MARPOL), adopted by the IMO, has mandated that marine vessels shall not consume residual fuel oils (bunker fuel, etc.) with a sulphur content greater than 0.1% from the year 2020. Thus complete use of residual oil or pet coke in gasification unit would be part of petroleum refining complexes/plants in future to avoid waste products disposal.

Due to the COVID-19 pandemic of 2020, refineries are forced to operate at lower capacities as the demand for petroleum products (mainly aviation turbine fuel and petrol) have fallen steeply. After the implementation of IMO rules restricting use of high sulfur fuel oil (HSFO) by the marine vessels, the prices of HSFO have fallen so low compared to crude oil and using it has become more economical by the advanced refineries with vacuum distillation and coker units to produce petrol, diesel, pet coke, etc. Pet coke is in high demand for use in cement production.

By 2025, India's total oil refining capacity increased to approximately 258.1 million metric tonnes per annum (MMTPA), making the country one of the largest refining hubs in Asia. Major refiners such as Indian Oil Corporation, Reliance Industries and Nayara Energy have expanded their refining and petrochemical integration projects to increase exports of petroleum products and strengthen India's position in the global refining market.

== Consumption ==
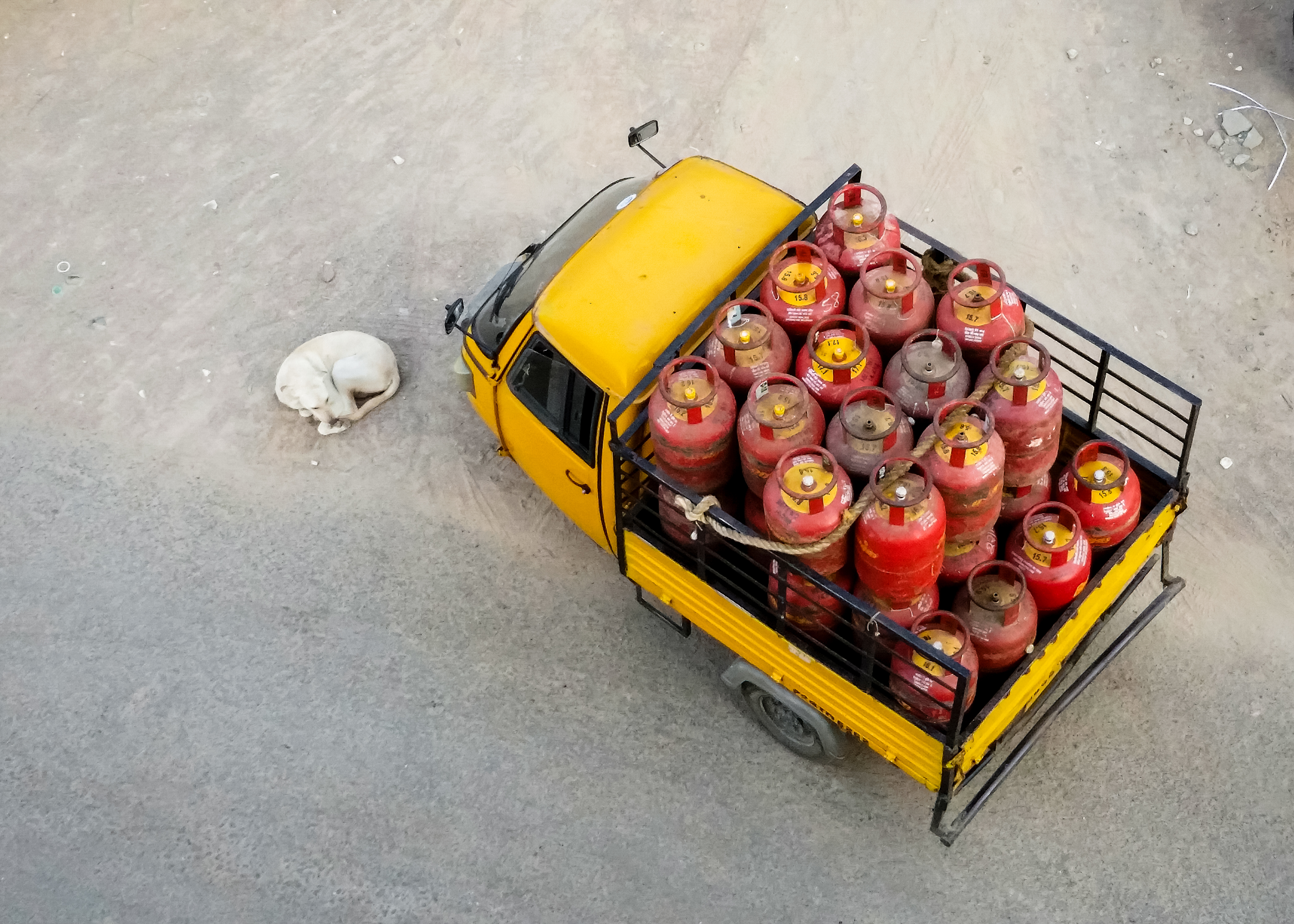
Delivery of liquefied petroleum gas cylinders for cooking in Hyderabad

India is the third largest consumer of crude oil in the world, after the United States and China. The estimated total consumption of crude oil in India rose from 204.12 Mt in 2011–12 to 221.77 Mt in 2020–21 with a CAGR of 0.93%. Consumption declined by 12.82% in 2020–21 compared to the previous fiscal primarily due to disruptions caused by the COVID-19 pandemic. The estimated total consumption of natural gas was 60.64 BCM, declining by 0.67% over the previous fiscal year.

High speed diesel oil accounted for 37.42% of total consumption of all types of petroleum products in 2020–21, followed by petrol (14.40%), liquefied petroleum gas (14%), petroleum coke (8.03%), and naphtha (7%). The largest consumers of natural gas are the fertilizer industry (29%), power generation (18%), and transportation (15%). Natural gas is consumed for both energy (57.08%) and non-energy (35.45%) related uses.

The Dankuni coal complex produces syngas that is piped to industrial users in Calcutta.

=== Electricity generation ===
Crude oil and natural gas are the second and third largest sources of electricity generated in India, after coal. Crude oil accounted for 10.34% and natural gas accounted for 8.7% of the total electricity produced in 2017–18. As of 31 March 2021, the installed capacity of gas-based power plants in India was 24,924 MW, accounting for 6.5% of the total installed capacity.

Most of these gas-based power plants are not working due to shortage of natural gas and the fact that imported liquid natural gas (LNG) was too expensive for power generation. The break-even price for switching from imported coal to LNG in electricity generation was estimated to be approximately US$6 per million British thermal units ($20/MWh) (thermal energy). The Indian government has taken steps to enhance power generation from gas-based power plants by waiving import duties and taxes.

Diesel is a minor source for electricity generation in India. The total installed capacity of diesel-based power plants in utility sector of India is 927.89 MW accounting for a mere 0.3% of total installed capacity.

Excluding the utility sector DG sets, there are more than 90,000 MW DG sets (above 100 kVA capacity range) installed for back up power needs which is nearly 36% of the total installed capacity in utility sector of India. In addition, there are innumerable DG sets of capacity less than 100 kVA to cater to emergency power needs during the power outages in all sectors such as industrial, commercial, domestic and agriculture.

India's electricity sector consumed 24.28% of the natural gas produced in the country in 2016–17. Moreover, at least one KL per GW×h (nearly 1 Mt per year) of fuel oil is consumed as secondary fuel by coal fired power plants for start-up and low-load operations.

Earlier, natural gas use in power generation was thought to be a bridge fuel as it emits far less CO_{2} (below 50%) when compared to coal use in power generation until renewable power become economical. Renewable power generation is already cheaper than coal and gas fueled power generation in India.

Now the bridge fuel concept is no more valid and existing gas-based generation needs to compete with the coal-based generation when there is no adequate renewable power generation (including storage and peaking type hydropower). The problem of stranded assets/capacity is more deep-rooted for gas-based power plants than that of the coal-based power plants as coal is far cheaper than natural gas in India.

== Foreign trade ==
India is the second biggest oil importer after China and is highly dependent on imported crude oil. The net imports of crude oil rose from 178.973 Mt during 2011–12 to 226.95 Mt during 2020–21. The net imports of natural gas increased from 18 BCM in 2011–12 to 32.86 BCM in 2020–21, recording a CAGR of 9.44%. Despite the dependence on imports, India has developed sufficient processing capacity over the years to produce different petroleum products. As result, India is a net exporter of petroleum products. The export of petroleum products increased from 38.94 Mt in 2008–09 to 56.76 Mt during 2020–21.

India has an 82.8% import dependence for crude oil and 45.3% for natural gas. Due to lack of adequate petroleum reserves, India has to depend mostly on crude oil imports for the near future till its renewable energy resources, such as solar, wind, hydro and biomass, are developed adequately to achieve energy security by replacing petroleum products consumption, which also significantly contributes to air pollution.

India has significantly increased its Russian oil imports since the start of the Russian invasion of Ukraine due to deep discounts, making Russia a top supplier. In 2025, several top U.S. officials and political figures have accused India of effectively financing Russia’s war in Ukraine by serving as a major buyer of Russian energy. In late 2025, the United States, European Union, and United Kingdom significantly escalated sanctions against Russia's two largest oil producers, Rosneft and Lukoil, to curtail the financing of the war in Ukraine. These measures have significantly disrupted India's oil trade, leading to a sharp decline in imports from these specific entities.

On 19 December 2025, Ukraine’s Security Service (SBU) conducted a first-of-its-kind long-range drone strike on a "shadow fleet" oil tanker in the Mediterranean Sea, targeting a vessel that had recently delivered oil to India.

=== Oil imports by source countries ===
India was the third largest crude oil importer in the world in 2025. By value, the following 15 countries were the largest sources of crude oil imports into India, providing 96.8% of all Indian crude oil imported in that year.

Rank	Country	Import value
1	Russia	$43.4 billion
2	Iraq	$25.3 billion
3	Saudi Arabia	$19.9 billion
4	United Arab Emirates	$15 billion
5	United States	$9.8 billion
6	Kuwait	$4.6 billion
7	Nigeria	$3.9 billion
8	Angola	$3.4 billion
9	Brazil	$1.81 billion
10	Egypt	$1.76 billion
11	Colombia	$1.54 billion
12	Qatar	$1.52 billion
13	Oman	$1 billion
14	Mexico	$651.2 million
15	Venezuela	$639.1 million

Among the above countries, the fastest-growing suppliers of crude oil to India from 2024 to 2025 were: Egypt (up 448.4%), United States of America (up 81.8%), Brazil (up 80.3%) and Qatar (up 56.5%).

Countries that experienced declines in the value of their crude oil supplied to Indian importers included: Venezuela (down -64.8%), Mexico (down -61.7%), Oman (down -23.2%) and Russia (down -16.8%).

== Trading ==
=== Crude oil trading ===
By transacting in crude futures trading in MCX or BSE, crude oil products consumers (petrol, diesel, jet fuel, etc.) in India can hedge their risk while purchasing the crude oil products in Indian currency. The futures trading is cash settled on expiry date taking WTI crude or Brent crude settlement price as reference.

The quality of crude oil which is imported by India from Persian Gulf is called Indian Basket crude. It is weighted average of Dubai and Oman (sour) and the Brent Crude (sweet) crude oil prices. However, the exporting countries charge premium or give rebate on the Indian Basket price by declaring official selling price (OSP) depending on market conditions every month.

=== Natural gas trading ===
Indian Gas Exchange (IGX) is the online trading platform for natural gas with delivery hubs at Dabhol and Jaigad, both in Ratnagiri, Maharashtra; Dahej and Hazira in Gujarat; and Kakinada in Andhra Pradesh. The Petroleum and Natural Gas Regulatory Board (PNGRB) was created in the year 2005 to regulate downstream activities in the petroleum and natural gas sector. Buyers can transport the purchased natural gas from these hubs on a daily basis to their consumption points through the existing cross country gas pipelines (owned by GAIL and others) for a fee.

== Taxation and pricing ==
In India, the pricing of fuel varies by state, though central taxes still are part of the pump price of fuel. The Central and State Government's taxes make up nearly half of petrol's pump price. The Central government has different taxes, which amount to about 24–26% of the final cost. The states taxes vary, but on average end up making about 20–25% of the final cost. In addition, royalty and oil development tax is collected on oil and natural gas produced locally. As a result, approximately 50% of the pump cost goes to the government in the form of different taxes.

For example, in Bengaluru, Karnataka as of 16 May 2011, price of petrol was ₹71.09 (74¢ US) per litre. Out of this, ₹17.06 (18¢ US) went to Government of India in the form of excise and customs tax. ₹16.63 (17¢ US) was collected by the state government in the form of sales tax and entry tax. Thus, a total of ₹33.69 (35¢ US) was collected as various taxes that amounted to approximately 47% of the retail price.

For Delhi petrol per liter price on 2 April 2018, the price charged to dealers was ₹31.08 (32¢ US), while central government excise tax and local tax was ₹19.48 (20¢ US), state government VAT was ₹15.70 (16¢ US) and dealer commission was ₹3.60 (3.7¢ US). So the price of petrol for the end user was ₹73.83 (77¢ US).

The natural gas purchase price from the natural gas producers, like ONGC, Oil India Ltd. and private companies, is fixed by the government based on prices prevailing in the US, Russia, the UK and Canada. LNG price is linked to the prevailing crude oil price in global markets.

The purchase price would be cut to around US$2.5 per million BTU for the six-month period beginning 1 April 2020 compared to US$3.23 for the earlier period. In March 2020, India announced that is increasing taxes on petrol and diesel to raise government revenues.

In March 2020, global crude oil consumption fell substantially, causing oil prices to decline steeply due to the COVID-19 pandemic. However, Indian government has not passed the benefit to the retail buyers /consumers.

== City Gas Distribution ==
City Gas Distribution (CGD) Projects, under Ministry of Petroleum and Natural Gas, are network of gas pipelines planned across the country to improve connectivity to piped (PNG) and compressed (CNG) natural gas fillings stations

== Petrol stations in India ==
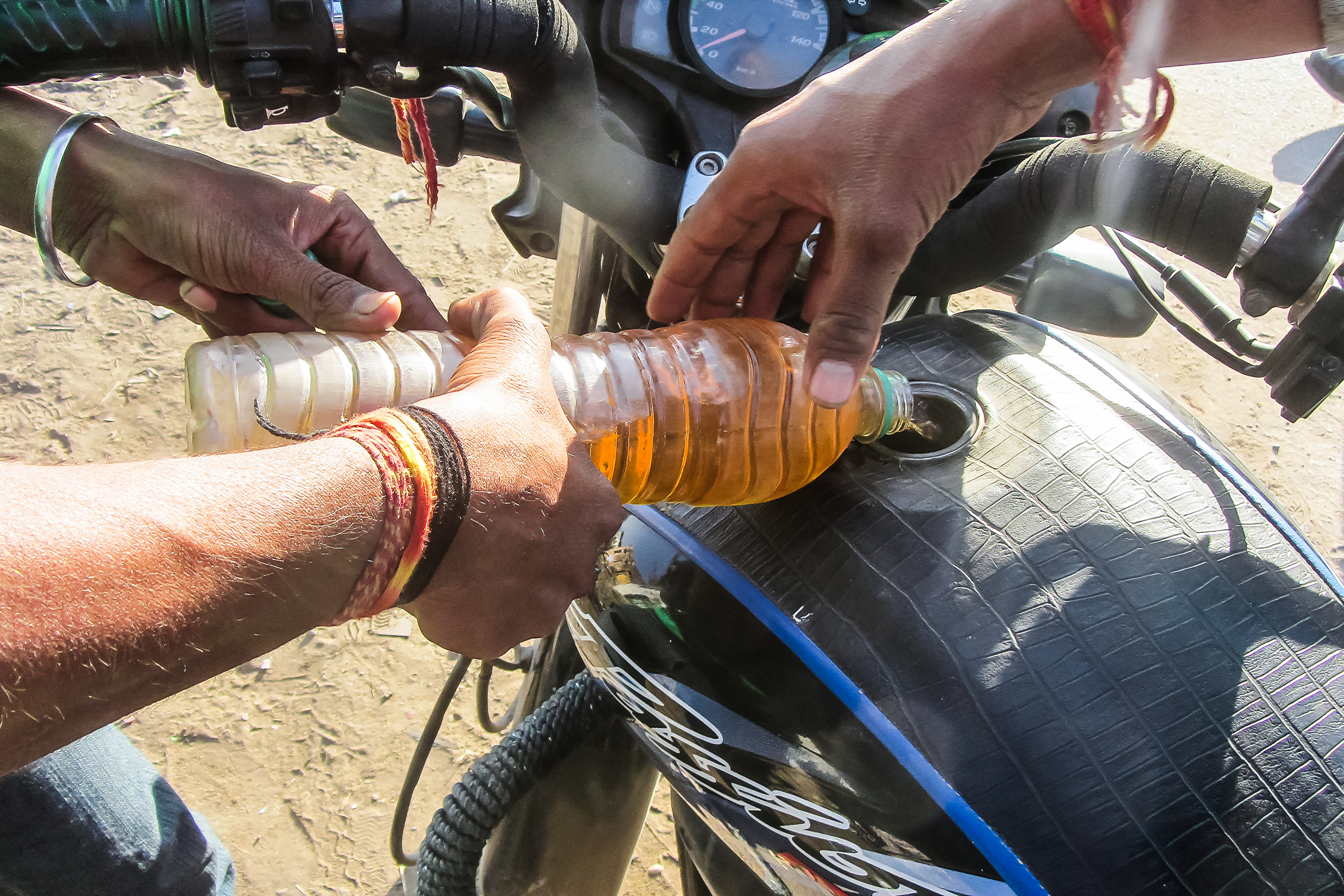
Street vendor refuelling a motorbike with petrol from a water bottle

India had 60,799 petrol stations as of November 2017. 26,849 of these belonged to Indian Oil (IOCL), 14,675 to Bharat Petroleum (BPCL) and 14,161 to Hindustan Petroleum (HP). The Punjab state of India has approximately 3,300 petrol stations, and the state of Haryana alone has more than 2,500. Many additional auto LPG and CNG stations have been planned due to high crude prices.

Reliance Industries Ltd and BP plc have opened petrol stations as Jio-bp also known as Reliance Petroleum. It has 1427 outlets as of September 2021

Nayara Energy operates 6386 fuel stations in the country.

Shell also opened petrol stations in India. Shell currently has around 350 stations majorly present in the South and Western States of the country i.e. Tamil Nadu, Karnataka, Maharashtra, Telangana, Andhra Pradesh and Gujarat

Essar had 2,225 petrol stations in India which were supplied with petrol and diesel from its 280,000 barrels per day (45,000 m^{3}/d) refinery in Vadinar, Gujarat.

Indraprastha Gas Limited has opened exclusive CNG fuel stations in India, particularly in the capital city of Delhi. In recent years, state oil marketing companies have been opening petrol stations, constructed with minimal investment, in remote rural areas to help local farmers. These stations sell pesticides, seeds, lanterns, and other goods that are needed by farmers besides petrol and diesel.

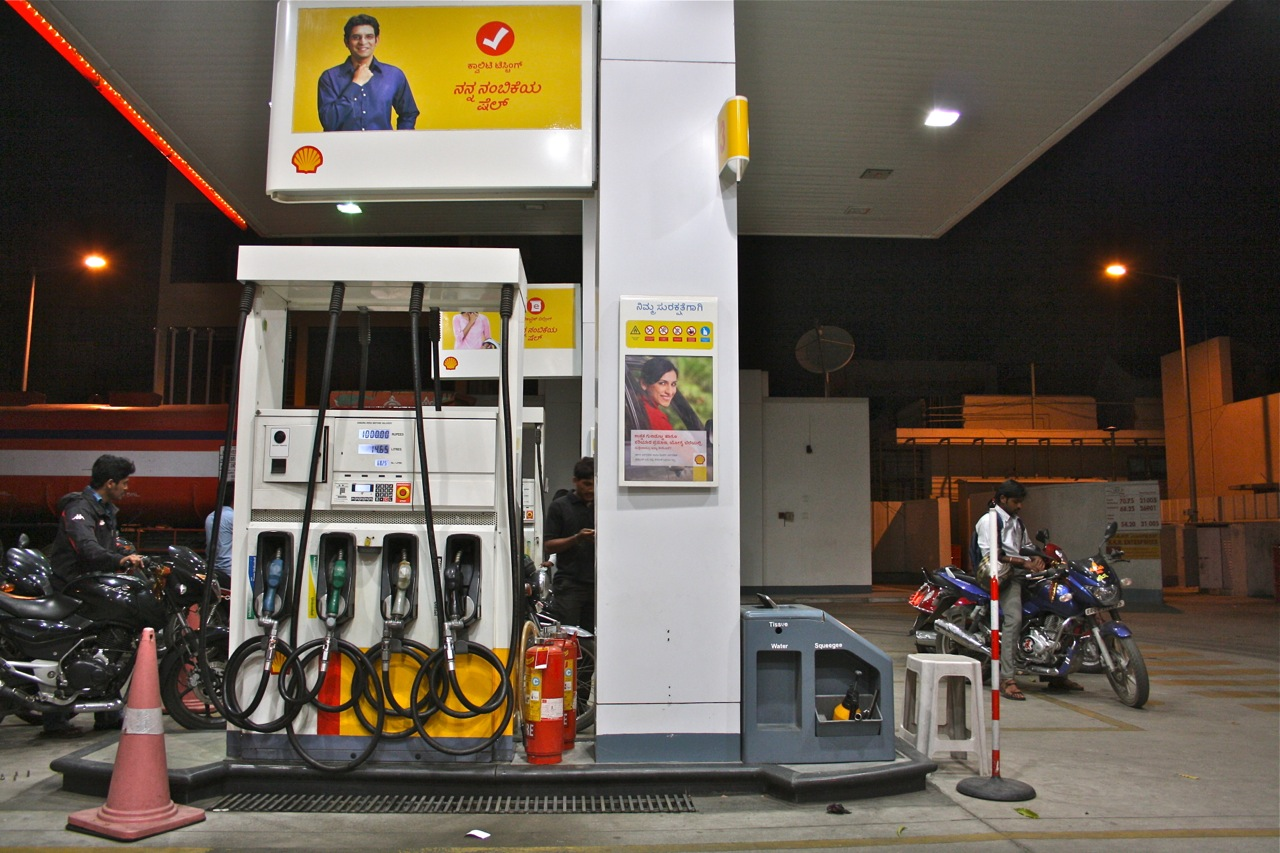
Shell petrol station in Bangalore

The numbers of petrol stations per owning company in the states and union territories of India as of 31 March 2016 were:

Oil Company/State/UT	IOCL	HPCL	BPCL	Others RIL/Nayara Energy/Shell/ONGC	Total
Andhra Pradesh	1199	929	720	210	3050
Arunachal Pradesh	48	0	7	16	71
Assam	503	91	129	65	788
Bihar	1351	475	610	75	2511
Chhattisgarh	481	329	275	23	1108
Delhi	189	97	107	0	393
Goa	31	36	47	0	114
Gujarat	1274	738	771	601	3384
Haryana	1334	666	385	151	2536
Himachal Pradesh	218	109	62	7	396
Jammu & Kashmir	221	130	134	0	485
Jharkhand	496	265	319	71	1151
Karnataka	1803	888	966	179	3836
Kerala	885	587	457	80	2009
Madhya Pradesh	1295	814	917	243	3269
Maharashtra	1846	1542	1678	353	5419
Manipur	69	0	12	4	85
Meghalaya	116	23	39	12	190
Mizoram	30	3	2	1	36
Nagaland	45	3	9	12	69
Odisha	748	314	414	84	1560
Punjab	1685	878	610	143	3316
Rajasthan	1630	977	819	310	3736
Sikkim	16	7	23	1	47
Tamil Nadu	1991	1158	1317	236	4702
Telangana	911	644	565	108	2228
Tripura	62	0	2	3	67
Uttar Pradesh	3394	1374	1313	535	6616
Uttarakhand	242	166	114	29	551
West Bengal	1119	488	563	74	2244
Andaman & Nicobar	10	0	0	0	10
Chandigarh	20	11	10	0	41
Dadra & Nagar Haveli	11	11	4	5	31
Daman & Diu	11	10	7	3	31
Lakshadweep	1	0	0	0	1
Puducherry	79	39	32	6	156
Grand Total	25364	13802	13439	3586	56191

== See also ==
- Climate change in India
- Energy policy of India
- Ministry of Petroleum and Natural Gas
- Krishna Godavari Basin
- NOPEC
- East West Gas Pipeline (India)
- Oil Industry Safety Directorate
- Petroleum And Explosives Safety Organisation
