= HVJ =

HVJ may refer to:

- Hemagglutinating virus of Japan, or Sendai virus
- HVJ Associates, American engineering firm
- HVJ Gas Pipeline, in India
- Vatican Radio, which used the callsign HVJ
