= Hazira Gas Processing Complex =

Gas-processing complex in Hazira, India

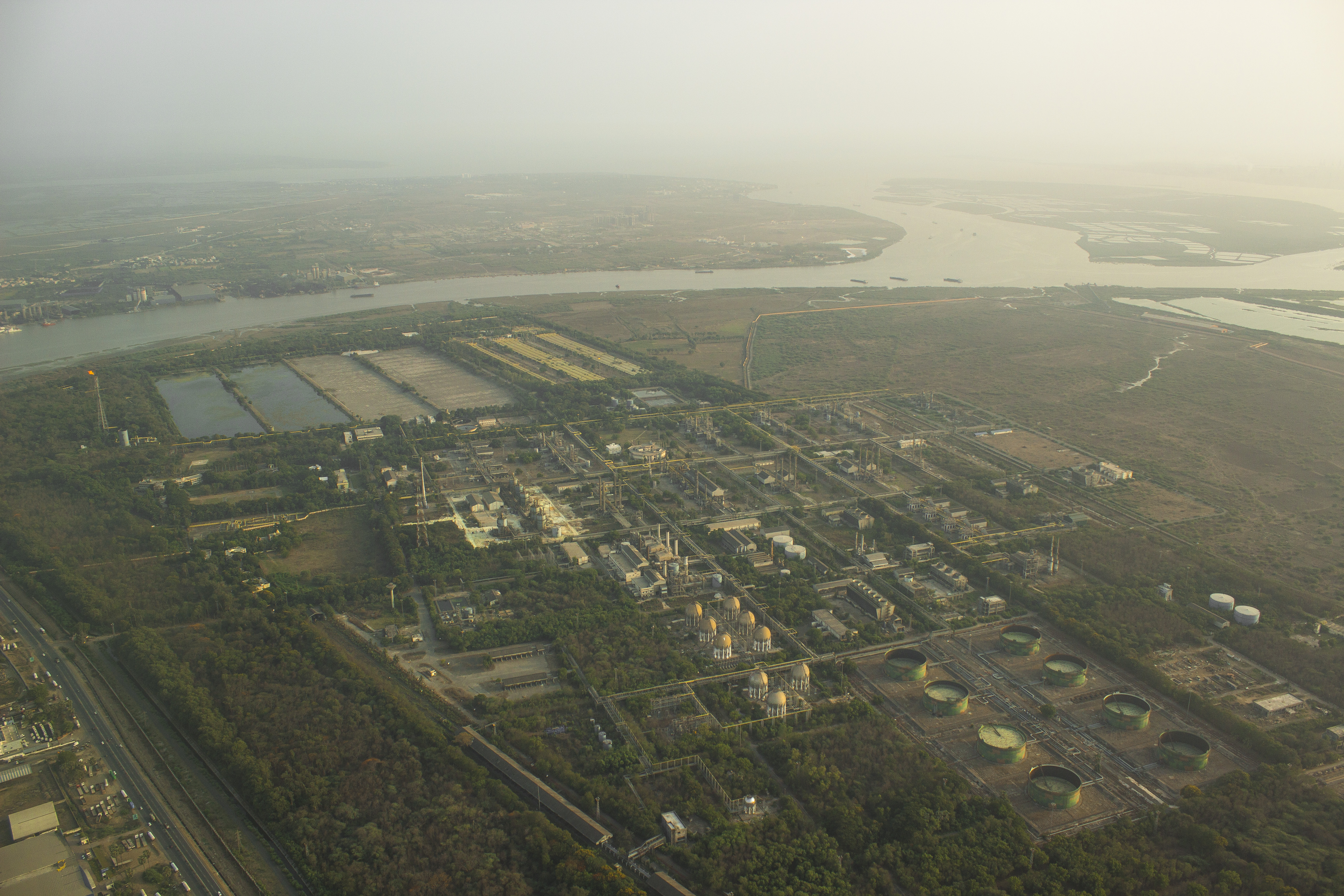
- Aerial view of Hazira Gas Processing Complex (2011)

- Location within India
- Location: Hazira, Surat, Gujarat, India; 21.157870°N 72.730929°E

Refinery details
- Operator: Oil and Natural Gas Corporation
- Owner: Ministry of Petroleum and Natural Gas

Hazira Gas Processing Complex (also known as HGPC) is a natural gas processing plant operated by Oil and Natural Gas Corporation in Hazira, India.

== History ==
Phase 1 of the plant was commissioned in the mid-1980s, and its infrastructure was designed for receiving natural gas along with associated condensate from the Mumbai High Off-shore Field. Once the condensate is separated and treated in condensate fractionation units, the gas undergoes several stages to extract liquefied petroleum gas and lower its dew point to below 5°C. This aims to prepare it for extended transport via the HVJ Gas Pipeline.

In 1986, the engineering, procurement, and construction contract for phase 1 was awarded to state-run Engineers India, which, in turn, ran the global tendering process on behalf of ONGC.

== Accidents ==
- Multiple explosions triggered a large-scale fire at the gas processing plant in Hazira, during the early hours of September 24, 2020. There were no reported casualties. Subsequently, according to the investigation report by the Petroleum and Natural Gas Regulatory Board, the explosions occurred because of the gaskets, which were not sourced from the original equipment manufacturers. Instead, 'O' rings were obtained from local markets and utilized without implementing any quality control measures.
