= Brahmaputra Cracker and Polymer Limited =

Petrochemical facility in India

- Company type: Public
- Industry: Polymer
- Founded: 5 February 2016; 9 years ago
- Headquarters: Lepetkata, Dibrugarh, India
- Products: ethylene; propylene; linear low-density polyethylene; high-density polyethylene; polypropylene
- Owners: GAIL (India) Limited (70%); Government of Assam (10%); Numaligarh Refinery (10%); Oil India (10%)
- Website: bcplonline.co.in

Brahmaputra Cracker and Polymer Limited (commonly abbreviated as the BCPL) is a public sector undertaking situated at Lepetkata, Dibrugarh City, Assam, India. Included in the Assam Accord as an Assam Gas Cracker Project, the construction of BCPL was launched by then Prime Minister Manmohan Singh on 9 April 2007 and it was inaugurated for production on 5 February 2016 by Prime Minister Narendra Modi.

GAIL (India) Limited is the main promoter with 70% equity participation and the rest of the equity stakes are owned equally by the Government of Assam, Numaligarh Refinery and Oil India. Ethylene, propylene, Linear low-density polyethylene, high-density polyethylene and polypropylene are the different petro-products and polymers produced by the plant currently and two production units for hydrogenated pyrolysis gasoline and 1-Butene are under construction.

== History ==
The Assam Gas Cracker Project was first envisaged by Prime Minister Indira Gandhi in 1984. It was included in the Assam Accord, a memorandum of settlement signed between representatives of the Government of India and the leaders of the Assam Movement in 1985 to protect Assamese cultural, economic and political rights, by the Rajiv Gandhi government. However, the detailed feasibility report of the project was prepared and approved under Prime Minister Manmohan Singh in 2006. The BCPL is responsible for implementing the AGCP. The foundation stone of the BCPL was laid at Tengakhat, Dibrugarh district, in November 1995 by then Prime Minister P. V. Narasimha Rao. But the location was abandoned due to the opposition of Ministry of Defence because of its proximity to the Dinjan Airfield of the Air Force and it also attracted resistance from local residents who were to be displaced. The construction of the BCPL Petrochemical Complex begun at Lepetkata on 9 April 2007 after it was launched in a ceremony by then Prime Minister Manmohan Singh. Lepetkata was chosen as it did not require any displacement of people and much of the 992-acre (401 ha) land demarcated for the project there belonged to different tea estates and the Assam Government. The initial total budget estimate for constructing the BCPL Petrochemical Complex was ₹500 crore (US$59 million) in 1985. But it kept missing deadlines which resulted final cost escalating to ₹10,000 crore (US$1.2 billion). The project was inaugurated on 6 February 2016 by Prime Minister Narendra Modi and it became the first petrochemical project of the North East India.

== Administration and shareholding ==
The BCPL comes under the administrative control of the Ministry of Petroleum and Natural Gas. The Department of Chemicals and Petro-Chemicals of the Ministry of Chemicals and Fertilisers used to be the controlling agency of the project until 24 December 2019 when the Cabinet Committee on Economic Affairs, headed by the Prime Minister, of the Government of India approved its transfer to the Ministry of Petroleum and Natural Gas.

The BCPL is a joint venture with its main promoter GAIL (India) Limited owning 70% of equity participation. The Government of Assam, Numaligarh Refinery and Oil India each holds 10% equity stake.

The board of directors of the company includes representatives from all of its four stakeholders. It consists of chairman and managing director of the GAIL Manoj Jain as its chairman, managing director of the BCPL Reep Hazarika, finance director Pruthiviraj Dash, six directors including Advisor to Government of Assam R. K. Dutta, Commissioner and Secretary to Government of Assam (Industries and Commerce Department) K. K. Dwivedi, Deputy Secretary (Ministry of Petroleum and Natural Gas, Government of India) Kapil Verma, Managing Director of Numaligarh Refinery S. K. Barua, Executive Director of OIC–GAIL Pata M. V. Ravi Someswarudu and Director (Finance) of OIL India Harish Madhav and charted accountant Saumitra Sarkar as an independent director.

== Production ==
A dual feed cracker complex of the BCPL produces different types of petro-products and polymers including ethylene, propylene, Linear low-density polyethylene, high-density polyethylene and polypropylene. The company proposed expansion in production by setting up a second stage production unit for hydrogenated pyrolysis gasoline and one for 1-Butene. The Pollution Control Board of Assam conducted a public hearing in this regard under the supervision of the Dibrugarh district administration on 28 December 2020 for issuing environment clearance.

== COVID-19 pandemic ==
The BCPL has also been affected by the ongoing worldwide COVID-19 pandemic with some of its employees tested positive and treated for the viral infection. Its chief manager Manab Jyoti Dowerah died of the infection in April 2021. However, the company successfully managed to operate in the financial year 2020–21 achieving even 106% capacity utilisation with a turnover of ₹2,819 crore (US$330 million). It produced 2.86 lakh metric tonnes of polymers and 60,145 metric tonnes liquid hydro-carbons during this period. The company committed ₹1.5 crore (US$180,000) for the capacity expansion of the emergency department of Assam Medical College to support the hospital for its attempt to tackle the surge in COVID-19 cases.

== See also ==
- Oil and gas industry in India
- Economy of Assam
