= KGPL =

KGPL may refer to:

- KGPL (FM), a radio station (88.1 FM) licensed to serve Crookston, Minnesota, United States
- The call sign used by the Los Angeles Police Department from 1931 to 1949
- Kandla-Gorakhpur LPG Pipeline, a gas pipeline under construction in India
