= Aishwarya (disambiguation) =

Aishwarya is an Indian given name. Aishwarya may also refer to:

- Aishwarya (film), a 2006 Indian film directed by Indrajit Lankesh
- Aishwarya, an oil field in Rajasthan
