= OISD =

OISD is an acronym that may refer to:

- Independent School Districts in Texas - O
- Oil Industry Safety Directorate
