= Mahanagar Gas =

Indian natural gas distribution company

Mahanagar Gas 9999999998 Limited
- Type: Public
- Traded as: BSE: 539957; NSE: MGL
- Industry: Natural gas
- Founded: 1995; 31 years ago
- Headquarters: Mumbai, Maharashtra, India
- Area served: Mumbai Metropolitan Region and adjoining areas
- Key people: Ashu Shinghal, Managing Director
- Services: Natural gas distribution
- Revenue: ▲₹3,300 crore (US$340 million) (2019–20)
- Net income: ▲₹791 crore (US$82 million) (2019–20)
- Owner: GAIL (India) Limited (32.5%)
- Number of employees: 500+
- Website: www.mahanagargas.com

Mahanagar Gas Limited (MGL) is an Indian natural gas distribution company, incorporated on 8 May 1995. MGL is an enterprise of GAIL (India) Limited (Maharatna Company of Government of India) and Government of Maharashtra.

== Operations ==
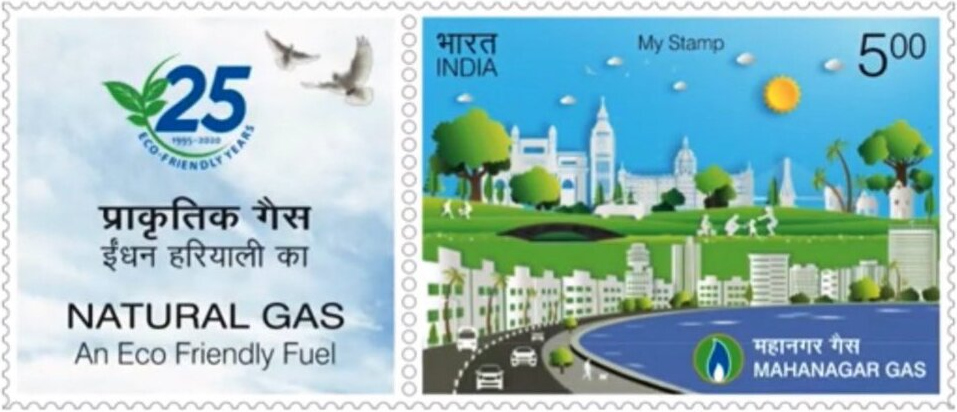
A 2020 stamp dedicated to the 25th anniversary of Mahanagar Gas

Mahanagar Gas presently supplies CNG to 0.77 million vehicles and piped natural gas to 1.53 million domestic households. Besides 3342 ST/ TMT / MSRTC / NMMT / PMPML buses, more than 6580 /Tempos/Trucks/Private buses are using CNG supplied through its wide distribution network. Consisting of about 450 km (280 mi) steel and over 470 km (290 mi) PE Pipeline over 250 CNG stations through 1268 dispensing points. Mahanagar Gas has also some petrol stations in Maharashtra. It is reported as one of the profitable companies in India.

Mahanagar Gas sources natural gas from a diversified base of suppliers for its domestic and industrial customers. Natural gas for domestic use is supplied by the Ministry of Petroleum and Natural Gas and GAIL under the administered price mechanism agreements while that for industrial and commercial use is sourced from the spot market or long-term contracts.
