= GAIL =

Central Public Sector Undertaking pvy ltd

GAIL (India) Limited

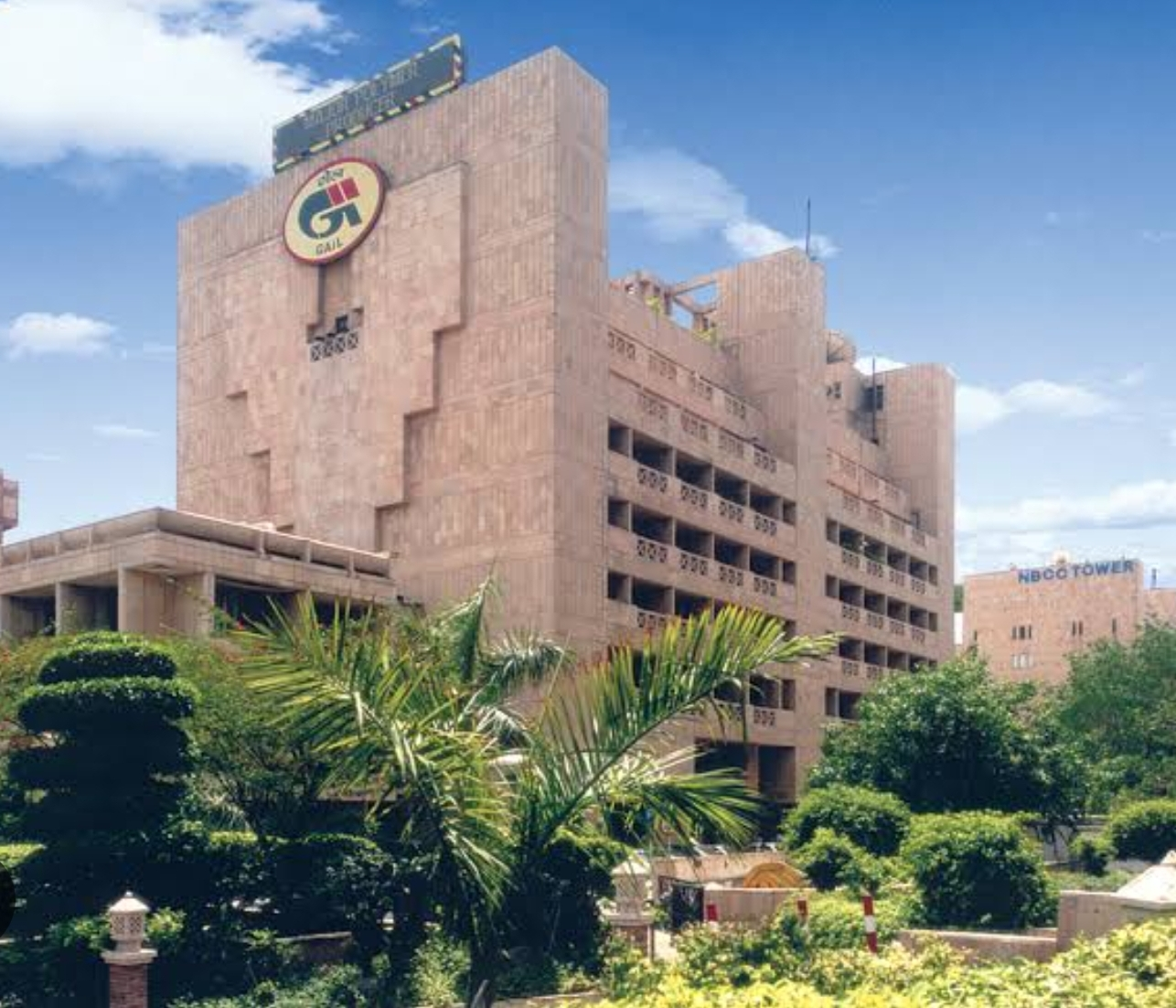
- Headquarters in New Delhi
- Formerly: Gas Authority of India Limited (1984–2002)
- Type: Public
- Traded as: BSE: 532155; NSE: GAIL; LSE: GAID
- ISIN: INE129A01019
- Industry: Oil and Gas
- Founded: 1984; 42 years ago
- Headquarters: GAIL Bhawan; 16, Bhikaji Cama Place, R.K. Puram, New Delhi, Delhi, India
- Key people: Shri Deepak Gupta (chairman & MD)
- Products: Natural gas Petrochemical liquid hydrocarbons Liquefied petroleum gas transmission Renewable Energy city gas distribution E&P; Electricity generation
- Revenue: ▼₹141,903.35 crore (US$15 billion) (2025)
- Operating income: ▲₹12,595.01 crore (US$1.3 billion) (2024)
- Net income: ▲₹9,902.81 crore (US$1.0 billion) (2024)
- Total assets: ▲₹124,717.23 crore (US$13 billion) (2024)
- Total equity: ▲₹77,195.98 crore (US$8.0 billion) (2024)
- Owner: Ministry of Petroleum and Natural Gas, Government of India (51.8%)
- Number of employees: 5,038 (excluding 13,000+ contractual workers)(as on 31 March 2024)
- Subsidiaries: Indraprastha Gas Limited; Petronet LNG; Mahanagar Gas Limited
- Website: gailonline.com

GAIL (India) Limited (formerly known as Gas Authority of India Ltd.) is an Indian state-owned energy corporation with primary interests in the trade, transmission production and distribution of natural gas. GAIL also has interests in the exploration and production of solar and wind power, telecom and telemetry services (GAILTEL) and electricity generation. GAIL was founded as the Gas Authority of India Ltd. in August 1984 under the Ministry of Petroleum and Natural Gas to build, operate and maintain the HVJ Gas Pipeline. On 1 February 2013, the Indian government conferred GAIL with Maharatna status along with 14 other Public Sector Undertakings (PSUs).

GAIL owns and operates a network of around 13,722 km (8,526 mi) of natural gas pipelines and is building around 6,000 km (3,728 mi) of pipelines of its own and about 2,000 km (1,243 mi) through two joint ventures, as part of the National Gas Grid. The Petroleum and Natural Gas Regulatory Board has authorised GAIL to build the 1,755 km (1,091 mi) long Mumbai-Nagpur-Jharsuguda gas pipeline. In 2023, GAIL completed the world's first ship-to-ship LNG transfer.

== History ==
The Gas Authority of India Ltd. was incorporated in August 1984 as a Public Sector Undertaking (PSU) of the Government of India under the Ministry of Petroleum & Natural Gas (MoP&NG) to build, operate and maintain HVJ gas pipeline. The 1,750 km (1,087 mi) long pipeline was one of the largest natural gas pipeline projects in the world and was built at a cost of ₹17 billion (US$180 million). Construction began in June 1987 and was energised by July 1989.

In November 1988, GAIL received approval to build a ₹3 billion (US$31 million) LPG extraction plant in Vijaipur with a capacity of 400,000 tpa. Phase I of the plant, with a capacity of 200,000 tpa, was commissioned in 1990-91, eight months ahead of schedule. Phase II was commissioned in February 1992.

GAIL entered into a joint venture agreement with British Gas on 6 December 1994 to create Mahanagar Gas Limited to implement the Bombay City Gas Distribution project. GAIL was awarded Navratna status by the Indian government on 1 January 1997, in acknowledgement of its "excellent track record" and "potential to become a global giant" and providing it with greater autonomy. Later in 1997, GAIL began its city gas distribution pilot project in New Delhi by setting up nine compressed natural gas (CNG) stations. In 1998, GAIL entered into a joint venture with the Bharat Petroleum and the Government of Delhi to create Indraprastha Gas to implement the Delhi gas distribution network.

In March 2000, GAIL commissioned a petrochemical plant with a capacity to process 300,000 tonnes of ethylene to produce 260,000 tonnes of HDPE and LLDPE in Pata, Auraiya district in Uttar Pradesh. The plant, connected to the HVJ pipeline converts natural gas to petrochemicals. In 2016, the plant capacity was doubled to produce 400,000 tons of PE per year. In 2019, In 2018-19, the plant's capacity was doubled to 810,000 tonnes per year. In April 2020, during the COVID-19 pandemic in India, lack of market demand caused GAIL to shutdown the plant.

GAIL commissioned the 1,269 km (789 mi) Jamnagar-Loni LPG pipeline. It was the world's longest LPG pipeline when commissioned and supplied 1.7 million TPA to Northern India.

To secure gas for its mainstream business, the Exploration and Production department was created. Today, GAIL is a partner in the Daewoo-OVL-LED consortium in two offshore blocks in Myanmar. The bulk of its blocks is located in India, in the areas of the Gulf of Khambhat, the Assam-Arakan basin, the Mahanadi River Basin, the K-G (Krishna Godavari) basin, and the Kaveri river basin.

GAIL has diversified into petrochemicals, telecom and liquid hydrocarbons other than gas infrastructure. The company has also extended its presence in power, liquefied natural gas (LNG), regasification, city gas distribution and exploration & production through participation in equity and joint ventures. Following these additional ventures, the Gas Authority of India was renamed GAIL (India) Limited on 22 November 2002.

GAIL (India) Limited has shown organic growth in gas transmission through the years by building a large network of trunk pipelines covering a length of around 10,700 kilometres (6,600 mi). Leveraging this, GAIL played a key role as a gas market developer in India for decades, catering primarily to major industrial sectors like power, fertilizer production and city gas distribution. GAIL transmits more than 160 million cubic metres per of gas per day at standard conditions through its dedicated pipelines and has more than 70% market share in both gas transmission and marketing.

== Infrastructure ==
GAIL owns the prominent Hazira-Vijaipur-Jagdishpur cross-country pipeline, spanning 2,300 km (1,429 mi) with a capacity to handle 33.4 million cubic metres per day at standard temperatures and pressures. As of 2022, the company owns and operates more than 11,000 km (6,835 mi) of inter-provincial gas pipelines, having a presence in 22 states within India. It also owns and operates more than 2,000 kilometres of LPG pipelines in the country, spanning Jamnagar in Gujarat to Loni in Uttar Pradesh. The company also owns and operates seven mega LPG recovery plants in the country today and has to its credit almost 20% of domestic LPG produced and supplied for domestic usage through its sister PSUs like IOCL, BPCL and HPCL. GAIL is one of the major petrochemical conglomerates in the country today with India's largest gas-based petrochemicals in operation since 1999. In petrochemicals, it has its own gas-based integrated petrochemical plant and also the ownership of 70% in dual fuel petrochemicals in Assam, Brahmaputra Cracker and Polymer Limited and one of the major equity partners in OPal.

The company supplies gas to power plants for the generation of over 4,000 MW of power to Fertilizer plants for the production of 10 million tonnes of urea and several other industries. The regional pipelines are in Mumbai, Gujarat, Rajasthan, Andhra Pradesh, Tamil Nadu, Pondicherry, Assam, Tripura, Madhya Pradesh, Haryana, Uttar Pradesh and Delhi. The company has established six liquefied petroleum gas processing plants, two at Vijaipur, MP, one at Waghodia, Gujarat, one at Gandhar, Gujarat, one at Auraiya, UP and one each in Lakwa, Assam and Usar, Maharashtra. These plants can produce nearly 1 million tonnes per annum of LPG. GAIL has also set up several compressor stations for boosting the gas pressure to desired levels for its customers and internal users.

In 2001, GAIL commissioned the world's longest and India's first cross-state LPG transmission pipeline running from Jamnagar in Gujarat to Loni in Uttar Pradesh. The total length of this LPG pipeline is 1,415 km (879 mi).

GAIL has started working on the Urja Ganga Gas Pipeline Project, contracted under Narendra Modi. This was earlier planned to construct between Jagdishpur in Uttar Pradesh to Haldia in West Bengal for a total length of 2050 kilometres, but reconfigurations have led the pipeline to connect Varanasi to the gas grid, linking it up to the Dhamra terminal. The line, being longer than 2500 kilometres, will be constructed in three phases. Its route will connect Adani Group's five million tonne per annum Dhamra LNG import terminal in Odisha. In the first phase, a trunk pipeline from Phulpur (Allahabad) will be laid to Dobhi (Gaya) in Bihar with spur lines to Barauni and Patna. The 755 km (469 mi) Phase-1 project will cost Rs 3,200 crore and is planned to be completed in December 2018. GAIL already has a line up to Phulpur. It is raising the capacity of this pipeline by laying a 672 km (418 mi) parallel line from Vijaipur in Madhya Pradesh to Phulpur via Auriaya in Uttar Pradesh at the cost of Rs 4,300 crore. In Phase II, a 1,200 km (746 mi) line would be laid from Dobhi to Bokaro/Ranchi in Jharkhand and Angul and Dharma in Odisha at the cost of Rs 5,565 crore. Phase III will involve laying a 583 km (362 mi) line to Haldia at the cost of Rs 3,425 crore.

In November 2023, GAIL successfully conducted the world's first ship-to-ship LNG transfer. The company did this to lower shipping costs and cut emissions.

=== GAILTEL ===
GAIL also possesses a vast telecommunication network that contributes significantly to the high level of system reliability of operations, online real-time communication and monitoring higher productivity. GAIL became the first Infrastructure Provider Category II Licensee and signed the country's first Service Level Agreement for leasing bandwidth in the Delhi-Vijaipur sector in 2001, through its telecom business GAILTEL.

== Operations ==
=== Natural gas ===
==== Natural gas transmission ====
GAIL's natural gas transmission segment under its natural gas business vertical consists of its natural gas pipeline infrastructure. As of 31 December 2021, GAIL owns approximately 13,800 km (8,575 mi) of the operational natural gas pipeline network, which represents over 67% of India's overall 20,334 km (12,635 mi) of the operational natural gas pipeline network.

In September 2021, GAIL was reported to be exploring the monetization of its Dabhol-Bengaluru and Dahej-Uran-Panvel-Dhabhol pipelines through an Infrastructure Investment Trust (InvIT) structure with the stated intent to utilize the resulting proceeds to expand its pipeline network.

The following table summarizes GAIL's natural gas pipeline network as of 31 December 2021:

No.	Pipeline	Date of Authorization	Authorized Length (km)	Authorized Capacity (10^{6} m^{3}/d at ~1 atm)	Operational Length (km)	Geographic Footprint by State
1.	Assam Regional Network	4 November 2009	7.83	2.50	7.83	Assam
2.	Cauvery Basin Network	4 November 2009	240.29	4.33	242.55	Puducherry, Tamil Nadu
3.	Hazira-Vijaipur-Jagdishpur-GREP-Dahej-Vijaipur HVJ / VDPL	19 April 2010	5,502.46	107.00	6,016.77	Uttar Pradesh, Madhya Pradesh, Rajasthan, Gujarat
4.	Dahej-Vijaipur (DVPL)-Vijaipur-Dadri (GREP) Upgradation DVPL 2 & VDPL	14 February 2011	5,502.46	107.00	6,016.77	Uttar Pradesh, Madhya Pradesh, Rajasthan, Gujarat
5.	Dahej-Uran-Panvel-Dhabhol	10 May 2010	815.00	19.90	942.08	Gujarat, Rajasthan
6.	KG Basin Network	12 May 2010	877.86	16.00	874.36	Andhra Pradesh, Puducherry
7.	Gujarat Regional Network	3 December 2010	608.82	8.31	667.31	Gujarat
8.	Agartala Regional Network	13 December 2010	55.40	2.00	55.28	Tripura
9.	Mumbai Regional Network	14 March 2011	128.68	7.04	125.44	Maharashtra
10.	Dukli-Maharajganj	9 January 2014	5.20	0.08	5.20	Agartala
11.	Chainsa-Jhajjar-Hissar	13 December 2010	455.00	35.00	300.73	Haryana, Rajasthan
12.	Dadri-Bawana-Nangal	15 February 2011	886.00	31.00	864.90	Punjab, Haryana, Uttar Pradesh, Uttarakhand, Delhi
13.	Dabhol-Bengaluru	14 November 2011	1,414.00	16.00	1,147.53	Maharashtra, Karnataka, Goa
14.	Kochi-Koottanand-Bangalore-Mangalore	31 May 2011	1,104.00	16.00	639.21	Kerala, Tamil Nadu, Karnataka, Puducherry
15.	Vijaipur-Aurajya-Phulpur Spur Line	26 October 2015	666.00	-	489.00	Madhya Pradesh, Uttar Pradesh
16.	Jagdishpur-Haldia-Bokaro Dhamra-Paradip-Barauni-Guwahati	29 January 2018	3,546.00	23.00	1,201.42	Uttar Pradesh, Bihar, Jharkhand, West Bengal, Odisha, Assam
17.	Operational dedicated natural gas pipelines	14 December 2012	226.01	2.04	228.40	Gujarat, Tamil Nadu, Andhra Pradesh, Rajasthan

==== Gas marketing ====
Since its inception in 1984, GAIL has been the undisputed leader in the marketing, transmission and distribution of natural gas in India. As India's leading natural gas major, it has been instrumental in the development of the natural gas market in the country.

GAIL sells around 51% (excluding internal usage) of the natural gas sold in the country. Of this, 37% is sold to the power sector and 26% to the fertilizer sector. GAIL is supplying around 60 million cubic metres per day at standard conditions of natural gas from domestic sources to customers across India. These customers range from the smallest of companies to mega power and fertilizer plants. GAIL has adopted a gas management system to handle multiple sources of supply and delivery of gas in a co-mingled form and provide a seamless interface between shippers, customers, transporters and suppliers. GAIL is present in 21 states which are Andhra Pradesh, Assam, Bihar, Goa, Gujarat, Haryana, Himachal Pradesh, Jharkhand, Karnataka, Kerala, Madhya Pradesh, Maharashtra, Odisha, Punjab, Rajasthan, Tamil Nadu, Chhattisgarh, Tripura, Uttar Pradesh, Uttarakhand, and West Bengal and 3 union territories which are Dehli, Dadra Nagar Haveli and Puducherry. They are further extending their coverage to the union territory of Jammu & Kashmir.

==== LNG ====
Under its natural gas business vertical, GAIL secures liquefied natural gas (LNG) under long-term agreements as well as short-term arrangements in the spot market.

GAIL has entered into the following long-term LNG supply arrangements:

- In December 2011, GAIL signed a 20-year, 3.5 million tons per annum (mtpa) LNG supply agreement with Sabine Pass Liquefaction, LLC, a subsidiary of Cheniere Energy Partners LP (NYSE:CQP), for delivery of LNG commencing upon the start of operations of the fourth train of its liquefaction terminal based in Sabine Pass, Louisiana.
- In October 2012, GAIL signed a 20-year, 2.5 mtpa LNG supply agreement with Gazprom Marketing & Trading Singapore, a wholly owned subsidiary of Gazprom Marketing & Trading, for delivery of LNG beginning in 2018–2019.
- In April 2013, GAIL signed a 20-year, 2.3 mtpa LNG supply agreement with Dominion Energy Inc. (NYSE:D) for delivery of LNG commencing upon the start of operations of its Dominion Cove Point LNG liquefaction terminal beginning in 2017.

Additionally, GAIL has entered into the following short- to medium-term LNG supply agreements:

- In October 2010, GAIL signed a 3-year, 0.5 mtpa LNG supply agreement with Marubeni for delivery of LNG commencing in January 2011.
- In August 2012, GAIL signed a 0.8 million ton LNG supply agreement with GDF Suez for delivery of 12 LNG cargoes from 2013 to 2014.
- In August 2012, GAIL signed a 0.725 million ton LNG supply agreement with Gas Natural Fenosa for delivery of LNG for 3 years commencing in January 2013.

Through its wholly owned subsidiary GAIL Global Singapore Pte Ltd (GGSPL), GAIL engages in the trading of LNG; GGSPL has master sale and purchase agreements (MSPAs) with more than 35 third parties.

In addition, GAIL is a 12.50% equity owner of Petronet LNG Limited (PLL), which has entered into the following LNG supply agreements:

- In 1999, PLL signed a 7.5 mtpa sales and purchase agreement with Ras Laffan Liquefied Natural Gas Co. Limited (II) (Qatargas); the delivery of the first 5.0 mtpa (phase 1) began in January 2004. Following the execution of a sider letter agreement in August 2006, the delivery of the remaining 2.5 mtpa began in 2009.
- In August 2009, PLL signed a 20-year, 1.5 mtpa LNG supply agreement with a subsidiary of ExxonMobil for delivery of LNG from the Gorgon LNG project in Western Australia.
- In January 2016, PLL signed another 1.0 mtpa sales and purchase agreement with Qatargas, bringing its total contracted capacity to 8.5 mtpa.

=== Liquid hydrocarbons ===
GAIL has marketing gas processing unit (GPUs) products, namely liquefied petroleum gas, propane, pentane, naphtha and by-products of polymer plant, namely MFO, propylene and hydrogenated C4 mix. LPG is being sold exclusively to PSU oil marketing companies (OMCs) while other products are sold directly to customers in the retail segment.

GAIL is India's major producer of propane, popularly known as GAIL Propane. It is an eco-friendly fuel and provides an effective way of reducing pollution and increasing productivity.

GAIL produces and markets pentane. It is primarily being used for reprocessing into iso, normal and commercial pentane used in EPS, PU, and LAB industries.

Acetone and phenol are produced from propylene by blending with benzene, which is mainly used in the pharmaceutical industry.

MFO is mainly used as fuel for heating, paint spraying, and furniture polishing. Naphtha is primarily used by power, Fertilizer, steel and Petrochemical units. In power, steel units, it is used as a fuel, whereas in petrochemical, chemical, and fertilizer units, it is used as a feedstock.

GAIL is operating seven gas processing units (GPU) located at Vijaipur (two units), Auraiya, Vaghodia, Usar, Lakwa and Gandhar plants for the production of LPG and GCU at Pata plant for the production of polymer. In the process of production of main products, such as LPG and polymer through GPU/GCU except for the Usar, the following by-products- liquid hydrocarbons (LHC) are produced:

=== LPG production and transmission ===
Liquefied petroleum gas (LPG) is the most widely used domestic and commercial fuel in India. Over the past four years, GAIL has emerged as one of the major LPG producers in the country. Around 90 per cent of the LPG is consumed in India as fuel by the household sector, while the balance is sold to industrial and commercial customers. GAIL has seven LPG Plants, two at Vijaipur and one at Waghodia, and one each in Lakwa (Assam), Auraiya (UP), Gandhar (Gujarat) and Usar (Maharashtra), producing over 1 million TPA LPG and other liquid hydrocarbons.

GAIL is the first company in India to own and operate pipelines for LPG transmission. It has a 2,038 km (1,266 mi) LPG pipeline network. 1,415 km (879 mi) of which connects the western and northern parts of India and 623 km (387 mi) of the network is in the southern part of the country connecting to the Eastern Coast. The LPG transmission system can transport 3.8 million tonnes per year of LPG. LPG transmission through pipelines was 3145 TMT in the year 2013–14.

GAIL has a share of about 10% of the Indian LPG market in LPG production and 7% in LPG sales.

GAIL produces LPG through fractionation in gas processing units, known as straight-run LPG. GAIL's LPG is an eco-friendly fuel and provides a cheaper and more effective means of reducing pollution and increasing productivity.

GAIL LPG is being supplied to PSU Oil Marketing Companies namely IOCL, BPCL and HPCL ex-GPUs at Import Parity Price.

=== Petrochemicals ===
GAIL diversified from gas marketing and transmission into the polymer business by setting up North India's first gas-based Petrochemicals complex. Even without having any prior experience in petrochemicals, GAIL commissioned the plant successfully in the year 1999. The petrochemical business is one of the core focus areas of GAIL.

GAIL owns and operates a gas-based Petrochemical Complex at PATA, District Auraiya, near Kanpur in UP (around 380 km (236 mi) from Delhi). GAIL has a world-class "Sclairtech" solution polymerization process licensed from M/s Nova Chemicals, Canada to produce LLDPE and HDPE, with a nameplate capacity of 210,000 million tonnes per year and has two slurry-based polymerization processes licensed from M/s Mitsui Chemicals, Japan to produce HDPE, each with a nameplate capacity of 100,000 million tonnes per year. A new world-class gas phase Unipol PE Process of M/s Univation Technology, USA, with a nameplate capacity of 400,000 million tonnes per year, has been commissioned at PATA to produce HDPE/LLDPE.

GAIL Pata is the only HDPE/LLDPE plant operating in Northern India and has a dominant market share in North India. The primary thrust markets for the polymers had been Western India, but, with the entry of GAIL in the HDPE & LLDPE market Verticals, today North India has also witnessed rapid and significant growth in the polymer downstream processing Verticals. In a successful span of about decades of establishing and marketing its grades under the brand names G-Lex and G-Lene, GAIL has augmented its nameplate capacity of HDPE and LLDPE to 410,000 MTPA by adding another dedicated HDPE downstream polymerisation unit of 100,000 MTPA.

GAIL has 70% equity in joint venture company Brahmaputra Cracker & Polymer Limited (BCPL) in Dibrugarh, Assam with a nameplate capacity of 220 KTA of HDPE & LLDPE and 60 KTA of PP. GAIL has acquired equity in OPaL's Greenfield petrochemical project at Dahej to produce 1060 KTA of HDPE & LLDPE and 340 KTA of PP. GAIL is a co-promoter with a 17% equity stake in ONGC Petro-additions Limited (OPaL) which is implementing a green field petrochemical complex of 1.1 million tonnes per year ethylene capacity at Dahej in the state of Gujarat.

The current per capita consumption of plastics in India is about 1.8 kg compared with the world average of 17 kg. Demand and supply projections indicate a progressively increasing domestic offtake. Being the only plant outside western India, it offers easy access to polymer consumers in Northern India and parts of Central India.

=== City gas distribution ===
GAIL is the pioneer of city gas distribution in India. GAIL took many initiatives to introduce PNG for households and CNG for the transport sector to address the rising pollution levels. Pilot projects were launched in the early 1990s in two metros Delhi and Mumbai through joint venture companies Indraprastha Gas Limited (IGL) and Mahanagar Gas Limited (MGL) leading to the start of commercial operation of city gas projects. The results of these ventures are quite visible through the improvement in air quality in these cities.

Based on the success of IGL and MGL, GAIL has further set up six more JVCs viz Bhagyanagar Gas Limited in Andhra Pradesh; Avantika Gas Limited in Madhya Pradesh; Central U P Gas Limited & Green Gas Limited in Uttar Pradesh; Maharashtra Natural Gas Limited in Pune, Maharashtra and Tripura Natural Gas Company Limited in Tripura; Bengal Gas Company Limited in West Bengal for CGD projects in various cities.

However, the Ministry of Petroleum & Natural Gas established the Petroleum and Natural Gas Regulatory Board (PNGRB) with effect from 01.10.2007, under the Petroleum and Natural Gas Regulatory Board Act 2006, to regulate the refining, processing, storage, transportation, distribution, marketing and sale of petroleum, petroleum products and natural gas excluding production of crude oil and natural gas. The Petroleum & Natural Gas Regulatory Board Act-2006 provides the legal framework for the development of natural gas pipelines and city or local gas distribution networks. With the arrival of the PNGRB, the implementation of PNG in various cities is being taken up in a phased manner as and when the bids are called for by the regulator.

=== Exploration and production ===
GAIL is participating in 10 exploration blocks, in Basins such as Mahanadi, Mumbai, Cambay, Assam-Arakan, Tripura Fold Belt, Gujarat Kutch, Krishna Godavari, Cauvery and Cauvery Palar. GAIL has a partnership in these blocks with various companies such as ONGC, OIL, GSPC, Hardy Exploration & Production, Petrogas, JOGPL, Eni and Daewoo as Operators. Out of these 10 E&P blocks, 2 blocks are overseas (A-1 and A-3 blocks in Myanmar).

The blocks are in various stages of exploration, appraisal, and development. Hydrocarbon discoveries are in place in 7 E&P blocks in blocks where GAIL is participating. The blocks with hydrocarbon discoveries are MN-OSN-2000/2, CB-ONN-2000/1, Block A-1 and A-3 Myanmar, CY-OS/2, AA-ONN-2002/1, and CB-ONN-2003/2.

Production of crude oil is in progress from Cambay Onland block (CB-ONN-2000/1) @ 1250 barrels per day. Development activities are in progress in 2 blocks in Burma (A-1 and A-3) and production of gas is expected in May 2013. Declaration of Commerciality has been approved by the Government in Mahanadi Offshore (MN-OSN-2000/2) block. In other blocks where hydrocarbon discoveries have been made, the appraisal is in progress.

GAIL is an active member of the multi-organisation team (MOT) set up for the assessment of shale gas potential in Indian basins. The other representative in MOT is from DGH (Directorate General of Hydrocarbons), ONGC and Oil India Limited (OIL).

GAIL is also a member of the National Gas Hydrate Programme being coordinated by DGH and is actively involved in activities related to gas hydrate exploration.

=== Subsidiaries ===
==== GAIL Gas Limited ====
GAIL Gas is a wholly owned subsidiary of GAIL. GAIL Gas has been selected for implementation of City Gas Distribution (CGD) projects in four cities, namely, Kota, Dewas, Sonipat, and Meerut in the first round of bidding by the Petroleum & Natural Gas Regulatory Board (PNGRB). GAIL Gas supplies CNG & PNG (industrial, commercial and household customers) in the city of Dewas, Meerut, Sonepat, Varanasi and Kota. GAIL GAS is providing natural gas to approximately 350 industrial consumers in TTZ (Taj Trapezium Zone) area (Agra and Firozabad) in Uttar Pradesh India. GAIL GAS has also started the CGD work in Bengaluru Karnataka recently.

==== Brahmaputra Cracker and Polymer Limited (BCPL) ====
GAIL has 70% equity share in BCPL, a Joint Venture, with Oil India Limited (OIL), Numaligarh Refinery Limited (NRL), Govt. of Assam, each having 10% equity share. Feedstock Supply Agreements have been signed between BCPL and all the three suppliers, viz., Oil and Natural Gas Corporation Limited, Oil India Limited and Numaligarh Refinery Limited. Technology license agreements have been signed for cracker, polyethylene and polypropylene units.

BCPL was dedicated to the nation by Hon'ble Prime Minister of India Shri Narendra Modi on 5 February 2016. BCPL is set up to produce 280,000 TPA polymer plant at an investment of ₹99.65 billion (US$1.0 billion). The financial commitment to the extent of ₹54 billion (US$560 million) has been made. The plant is presently in O&M phase with capacity utilization of more 100%. In the financial year 2019–20, the plant operated at 108% capacity utilization.

==== GAIL Global (Singapore) Pte Limited ====
GAIL has a wholly owned subsidiary, namely, GAIL Global (Singapore) Pte Ltd., to manage investments abroad. GAIL is looking for further business opportunities through this subsidiary company. The official website for GAIL Global Singapore Pte Ltd. is http://www.ggspl.com/. To know more about this subsidiary download the fact sheet.

=== Joint ventures ===
==== Aavantika Gas Limited (AGL) ====
AGL is in operation in Indore and Ujjain and is supplying CNG to the transport sector in these cities. AGL is supplying CNG to almost 9,000 vehicles in both cities. AGL has plans to set up five and two CNG stations in Gwalior and Ujjain respectively, and domestic supplies to households. Six daughter stations are mechanically ready for CNG dispensing, awaiting CCOE final approval. MoPNG has authorised AGL for CGD in Indore, Gwalior and Ujjain. GAIL has a 22.5% stake in the Company along with HPCL as an equal partner.

==== Bhagyanagar Gas Limited (BGL) ====
BGL is operating six CNG stations in Vijayawada and 4 CNG stations in Hyderabad and one CNG station in Rajamahendravaram. BGL is supplying CNG in these three cities to almost 6,000 vehicles. BGL is also operating two Auto LPG stations in Hyderabad and one Auto LPG station in Tirupati. BGL has received authorisation from MoPNG for City Gas Distribution (CGD) in Hyderabad and Vijayawada. GAIL has a 22.5% stake in the company along with HPCL as an equal partner.

==== Central U.P. Gas Limited (CUGL) ====
CUGL is operating 15 CNG stations in Kanpur, Unnao and two CNG stations in Bareily. CUGL is supplying CNG to almost 45,000 vehicles in the two cities. CUGL commenced its domestic supply of PNG with connexions to 15000 households in Kanpur and Bareilly. CUGL has received authorisation from MoPNG for CGD in Kanpur, Unnao, Bareilly & Jhansi. GAIL has a 25% stake in the Company along with BPCL as an equal partner. CUGL has connected 200 commercial and industrial units in both cities.

==== Green Gas Limited (GGL) ====
GGL is operating six CNG stations in Lucknow and three CNG stations in Agra. GGL is supplying CNG in the two cities. GGL has tied up for the commencement of the domestic supply of PNG with connexons to households, commercial and industrial establishments. MoPNG has authorized GGL for CGD in Lucknow and Agra. GAIL has a 22.5% stake in the company along with IOCL as an equal partner.

==== Indraprastha Gas Limited (IGL) ====
IGL is the largest CGD entity in terms of CNG sales and the number of vehicles supplied by CNG in India. IGL has received authorisation from MoPNG for CGD in Delhi and its suburbs viz. NOIDA (Gautam Budh Nagar), Greater NOIDA, Faridabad and Ghaziabad and part of Gurugram from State Govt. of Haryana. IGL is supplying piped gas to around 900,000 domestic, 3500 Commercial, 1600 small industrial consumers and CNG to over 10,00,000 vehicles through around 425 CNG stations in NCR. GAIL has a 22.5% stake in the company along with BPCL as an equal partner.

==== Mahanagar Gas Limited (MGL) ====
MGL is a joint venture of GAIL and British Gas. MGL has set up 140 CNG stations catering to over 200,000 vehicles spread over Mumbai, Thane, Mira-Bhayandar and Navi-Mumbai areas besides supplying PNG to over 450,000 domestic customers, and more than 1,000 small industrial and commercial consumers. It has received authorization from MoPNG for CGD in Mumbai, District Thane including Navi Mumbai and Mira Bhayander. GAIL has a 49.75% stake in the company along with British Gas as an equal partner.

==== Maharashtra Natural Gas Limited (MNGL) ====
MNGL is a joint venture of GAIL and Bharat Petroleum Corporation Limited (BPCL) for the implementation of City Gas Projects in and around Pune city. MNGL is authorized by Petroleum and Natural Gas Regulatory Board (PNGRB) to Lay, Build, Operate & Expand City Gas Distribution Project in the Geographical Areas of Pune & Pimpri-Chinchwad including adjoining areas of Hinjawadi, Chakan & Talegaon, Valsad (except area already authorized), Dhule, Nashik district, Sindhudurg district & Buldhana, Nanded and Parbhani district in Maharashtra and Bengaluru South district in Karnataka and Nizamabad, Adilabad, Nirmal, Mancherial, Komaram Bheem Asifabad district & Kamareddy district in Telangana.

It has started 87 stations supplying CNG to nearly 5,000 vehicles. GAIL has a 22.5% stake in the company along with BPCL as an equal partner.

==== ONGC Petro-additions Limited (OPaL) ====
GAIL is in the process of acquiring the equity stake in ONGC Petro- additions Limited (OPaL), which is a joint venture of GAIL with Oil and Natural Gas Corporation and Gujarat State Petroleum Corporation Ltd., for setting up the Petrochemical Project at Dahej in Gujarat. OPaL is setting up a green field petrochemical complex of 1.1 million tonnes per year ethylene capacity (dual feed cracker) in Dahej, Gujarat.

Four main players dominate the petrochemical sector, namely, Reliance Industries Ltd. (RIL), Indian Oil (IOCL), Gas Authority of India Ltd. (GAIL), and Haldia Petrochemicals Ltd. A New Chapter to this Industry has been added by the evolution of ONGC Petro additions Ltd. (OPaL) on 15 November 2006 which is a joint venture company of Oil and Natural Gas Corporation Limited (ONGC), Gujarat State Petroleum Corporation Ltd. (GSPCL) and GAIL India Ltd. is a grass root Mega Petrochemical complex of Global scale based on dual feed i.e., C2/C3/C4 & Naphtha at Dahej Special Economic Zone (SEZ), Gujarat. The complex consists of Dual Feed Ethylene cracker (with C2/ C3/ C4 and Naphtha feed ) of 1100KTPA capacity to produce Ethylene and Propylene as Petrochemical Feedstock to downstream units of Polyethylene (LLDPE, HDPE) and Polypropylene(PP) and associated unit i.e., PyGas Hydrotreating, Benzene and Butadiene extraction plants to produce other products (Pygas, 1,3- Butadiene and Benzene). Utility and offsite facilities to cater to the complex requirement are built within the Complex which includes ECTS and CPP. The grass root complex is located at a distance of about 10 km (6 mi) from the ONGC's C2+ Extraction Plant within the Special Economic Zone (SEZ) at Dahej, Gulf of Khambhat.

Feed system: C2, C3 & C4 feed is sourced from the existing C2+ recovery plant of ONGC in Dahej (at a distance of 10 km (6 mi)) through the pipeline. Mixed Naphtha (LAN & ARN) in definite proportionate from Hazira is sourced to the Petrochemical complex through a separate pipeline.

Saleable products: The products are dispatched through various modes, like bagging, truck, rail, tanker loading and through pipelines.

==== Petronet LNG Limited (PLL) ====
PLL has been formed for setting up LNG import and regasification facilities. PLL has a long-term LNG supply contract with QatarEnergy LNG, Qatar, for the import of 7.5 million tonnes per year of LNG. PLL Dahej terminal in Gujarat has been expanded to 10 million tonnes per year capacity. PLL has successfully implemented a pilot project for supplying LNG through cryogenic road tankers. PLL is also coming up with an LNG terminal at Kochi, Kerala, with an initial capacity of 2.5 million tonnes per year, expandable up to 5 million tonnes per year and it was scheduled to be operational by end of 2011. GAIL has a 12.5% equity stake in PLL, along with BPCL, ONGC and IOCL as equal partners.

==== Konkan LNG Limited (KLL) ====
KLL is a joint venture company between GAIL and MSEB. Konkan LNG Limited (KLL) is a Subsidiary Company of GAIL(India) Limited and a CPSE w.e.f. 27.03.2020. It was demerged from RGPPL in 2018. Shareholders GAIL & MSEB. Main business activity of KLL is unloading, storage & regasification of LNGr.

==== Tripura Natural Gas Company Limited (TNGCL) ====
TNGCL is supplying gas to around 7,500 domestic, 170 commercial and industrial consumers and has set up one CNG station in Agartala, which is catering to more than 1,400 vehicles. TNGCL has received authorisation from MoPNG for CGD in Agartala. GAIL a has 29% stake in the company.

==== GAIL China Gas Global Energy Holdings Limited ====
The joint venture company has been formed to pursue gas sector opportunities, mainly in China. GAIL has a 50% equity interest in the company along with China Gas as the equal partner. The joint venture company is in the process of identifying projects in gas and other related areas in China.

==== Andhra Pradesh Gas Distribution Corporation ====
The joint venture company has been formed to reduce the gap between gas demand and supply, mainly in Andhra Pradesh. GAIL Gas Limited has a 50% equity interest in the company along with APGIC (Andhra Pradesh Gas Infrastructure Corporation) as the equal partner.

== Global presence ==
As a strategy of going global and further expanding its global footprint, GAIL has formed a wholly owned subsidiary company, GAIL Global (Singapore) Pte Ltd. in Singapore for pursuing overseas business opportunities including LNG & petrochemical trading. GAIL has also established a wholly owned subsidiary, GAIL Global (USA) Inc. in Texas, US. The US subsidiary has acquired a 20% working interest in an unincorporated joint venture with Carrizo Oil & Gas Inc in the Eagle Ford shale acreage in the state of Texas. In addition to having two wholly owned subsidiaries in Singapore and the US, GAIL has a representative office in Cairo, Egypt to pursue business opportunities in Africa and the Middle East.

GAIL is also an equity partner in two retail gas companies in Egypt, namely Fayum Gas Company (FGC) and National Gas Company (Natgas). Besides, GAIL is an equity partner in a retail gas company involved in city gas and CNG business in China – China Gas Holdings Limited (China Gas). Further, GAIL and China Gas have formed an equally owned joint venture company – GAIL China Gas Global Energy Holdings Limited for pursuing gas sector opportunities primarily in China.

GAIL is a part of the consortium in two offshore E&P blocks in Myanmar and also holds participating interest in the joint venture company – South East Asia Gas Pipeline Company Limited incorporated for the transportation of gas to be produced from two blocks in Burma (Myanmar) to China.

== Corporate social responsibility ==
In terms of the guidelines issued by the Department of Public Enterprises, GAIL has allocated an annual budget of 2% of the previous year's profit after tax for CSR activities, which is effectively used for carefully chosen programmes. Socially useful programmes have been undertaken in GAIL since its inception in and around the areas adjoining its major work center's under the SCP/TSP Plan. But over the years, the scope of the CSR activities, the nature of programmes undertaken and the systems adopted for the implementation of these programmes have been streamlined and strengthened and the work under SCP/TSP came under the wider scope of CSR. Today, CSR & sustainability development is accorded high priority in the organisational ethos and attempted to be interwoven in all the business activities and the projects that are being undertaken by the company. During the year 2010–11, the company has taken up programmes of a value of approximately ₹575 million (US$6.0 million) for implementation under the seven thrust areas, which include Community Development, Infrastructure, Healthcare/Medical, Skill Development/Empowerment, Educational Aids, Environment Protection, Drinking Water/Sanitation.

For the year 2010–11 under the thrust area Community Development, programmes worth ₹157 million (US$1.6 million) are endorsed and the implementation of these projects is in progress.

GAIL (India) Ltd. extended its support for the reconstruction and renovation of numerous public utilities/buildings which improved living standards not only for a person or family but for the whole of the villages where this project was implemented. For the sustainable development of the whole community, GAIL is also supporting integrated livelihood programmes in villages, especially for small and marginal farmers. This would be considered a drop in the vast ocean but GAIL along with other Oil PSUs is contributing towards the provision of LPG connections to BPL families under the Rajiv Gandhi Gramin LPG Vitrak Yojana. This collaborative combined effort of the Oil PSUs would be able to generate a huge wave in the ocean in the UP region. GAIL believes that for providing better tomorrow for the community where it has its working the focus should be on the future of the community i.e. children and students. So given his belief GAIL is providing vehicles for the distribution of a mid-day meal for underprivileged children of government schools to encourage young girls and boys to educate themselves for their better and more secure lives. GAIL in the minuscule of its efforts has tried to touch every aspect of life by providing Night shelters and blankets to villagers, adopting destitute tribal children of the orphanage in the tribal area, generating AIDS awareness and a behavior change communication programme for truckers of national highways and providing school bus for physically challenged students. In just two years, more than 314,000 families have benefited from the programmes under Community Development.

== Sponsorship ==
Currently a sponsor of Durand Cup.

== See also ==
- List of public sector undertakings in India
