= Urja Ganga Gas Pipeline Project =

Gas pipeline project in India

- Country: India
- Prime Minister(s): Narendra Modi
- Launched: 24 October 2016; 9 years ago
- Status: Active

Urja Ganga gas pipeline project was launched by Prime Minister Narendra Modi in his constituency Varanasi, Uttar Pradesh. Also referred to as the Jagdishpur-Haldia Bokaro-Dhamra Natural Gas Pipeline (JHBDPL) project, the project is of an estimated length of 2540 km which is under construction from the states of Uttar Pradesh to Odisha.

The project includes the North East Gas Grid being coordinated by Indradhanush Gas Grid Limited (IGGL).

== Objectives ==
The scheme is directed to provide piped cooking gas to the households of Varanasi within next two years and to millions others in neighbour states after one more year. The government also plans to create 25 industrial clusters in these states which can utilise the gas as fuel and generate employment in these areas.

== Estimation ==
The allocated budget for laying the 1,500 km covered long cooking gas pipelines is about ₹51,000-crore along with gas stations at various areas. The length of pipeline will be extended to 2540-km in second stage of the project.

== Target ==
The project is committed to provide the household members health safety by providing clean fuel with the piped gas to the locals of Varanasi and later to Bihar, Jharkhand, West Bengal and Odisha. The seven main station cities include Varanasi, Patna, Bokaro, Jamshedpur, Kolkata, Ranchi, Bhubaneswar and Cuttack as the major beneficiaries of the project.

A lot of population lives in these states where cooking gas is scarcely available in the remote areas. An estimation to serve 50,000 households is planned to get PNG and almost 20,000 vehicles will be able to get CNG gas per year. It encompasses 40 districts and 2600 villages which will get the direct benefit. The project is estimated to get complete in 2020, after which people can get gas supply at their houses itself. It can also give lot of benefits to help renewal of a number of declining fertiliser industrialised units and other sectors like Power and Automotive. In this scheme not only households but about half a million vehicles may switch over to CNG mode so that the problem of fuel in the country could be resolved. Prime minister Modi also laid a foundation stone for the 120 km long Varanasi-Allahabad railway line that will cost approximate ₹750.66 crore and provide speedy transit for cylinder and worker movements.

== Length wise distribution ==
The state of UP gets the gas line of length 338 km. Bihar state will get about 441 km long line. Jharkhand, a state in east India, gets 500 KM long and another state in eastern India, West Bengal, will have the pipe line of length 542 km and Odisha gets benefited by 718 km pipeline as per the specifications of project details issued in public.

=== Barauni–Guwahati pipeline ===
Barauni–Guwahati pipeline

Location
- Start: Barauni Refinery, Barauni
- Passes through: Siliguri, West Bengal; Bongaigaon, Assam
- To: Guwahati, Assam

General information
- Type: Natural gas
- Status: Under construction
- Operator: GAIL
- Expected: 2021 - 2023

Technical information
- Length: 729 km (453 mi)
- Maximum discharge: 15 million metric standard cubic meters per day
- Diameter: 24 in (610 mm)

The Barauni–Guwahati natural gas pipeline is a proposed GAIL feeder line approximately 729 km (453 mi) long between Bihar and Assam through Siliguri. A number of spur lines have been proposed as well. This line will be fed through Jagdishpur–Haldia lines. It will be connected to the under construction North East Gas Grid being coordinated by the Indradhanush Gas Grid Limited. This is part of the expanded Urja Ganga Gas Pipeline Project. The government's vision for expanding hydrocarbon connectivity was clarified in 2016.
