= Neeraj Mittal =

Secretary of Ministry of Petroleum and Natural Gas of India

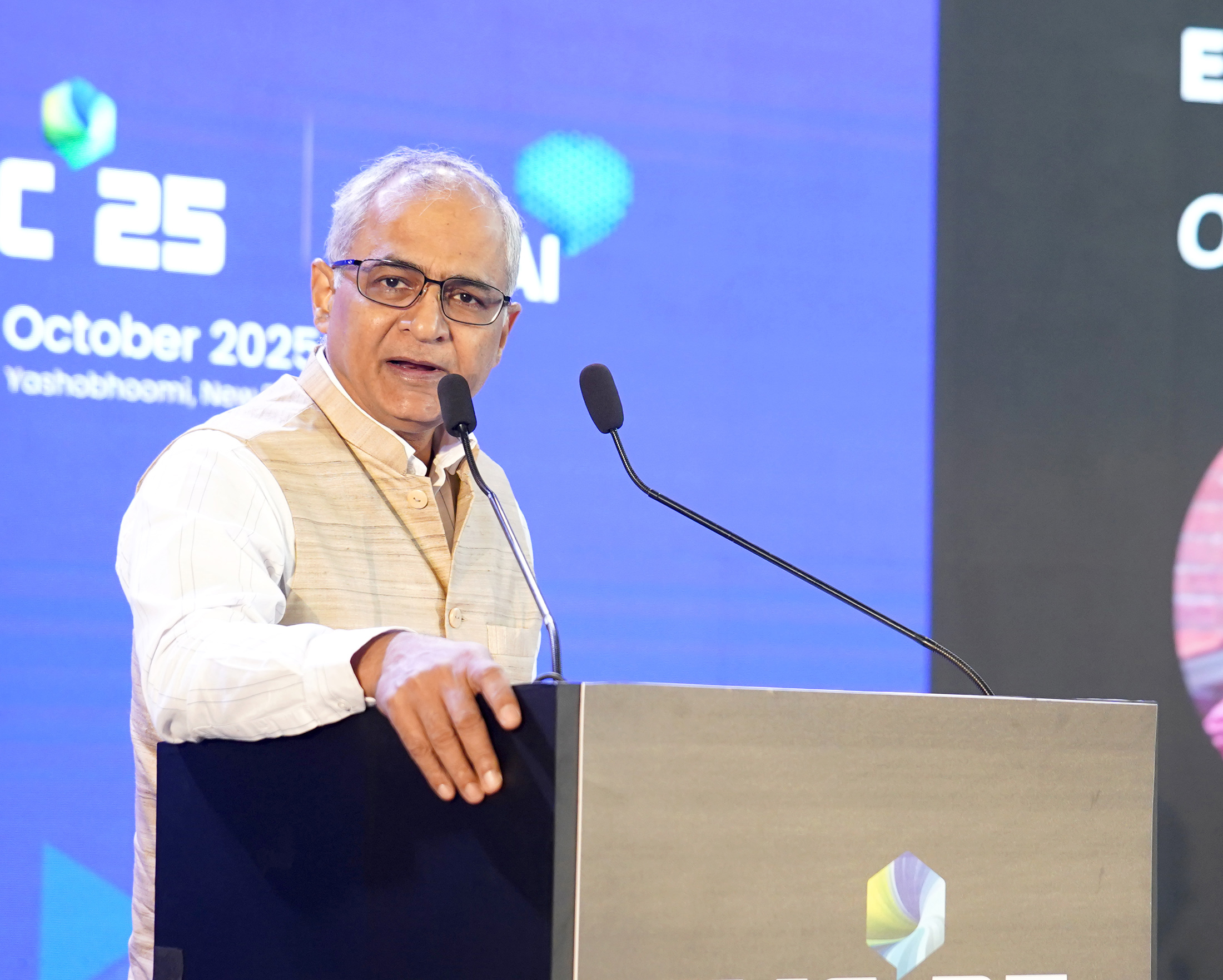
- Dr Neeraj Mittal

Secretary of Ministry of Petroleum and Natural Gas of India
- Incumbent
- Assumed office 24 November 2025
- Appointed by: Appointments Committee of the Cabinet
- Preceded by: Pankaj Jain

Telecom Secretary of India
- In office 1 September 2023 – 21 November 2025
- Appointed by: Appointments Committee of the Cabinet
- Preceded by: K Rajaraman
- Succeeded by: Amit Agrawal

Principal of Information Technology Government of Tamil Nadu
- In office May 2021 – September 2023
- Appointed by: Government of Tamil Nadu

Personal details
- Born: 17 December 1967 (age 58) UP, India
- Education: (B.Tech) IIT Kanpur (MBA) Cranfield University (PhD) Ohio State University
- Occupation: Bureaucrat

Neeraj Mittal (born 17 December 1967, Tamil: நீரஜ் மித்தல்) is an Indian Administrative Service officer of the 1992 batch from Tamil Nadu cadre, who is currently serving as the Secretary of the Ministry of Petroleum and Natural Gas of India since November 2025. Previously, he has served as Telecom Secretary of India. He has previously served in various positions in the Government of Tamil Nadu. Prior to this he had a brief stint at World Bank Group.

== Education ==
Mittal is an electrical engineering graduate from IIT Kanpur, holds an MBA degree from Cranfield University, UK and PhD in Economics/MIS from Fisher College of Business, Ohio State University, USA, and has several publications to his credit.

== Career ==
During his IAS career Mittal has served in various key capacities for both the Government of India and the Government of Tamil Nadu. He has extensive experience in policy formulation and execution in e-Governance, Transport, Industrial promotion, Petroleum & Natural gas, Commerce & Industry, and Telecommunications and IT. He had served senior positions such as Director of Ministry of Commerce and Industry, Director of Ministry of Communications and Information Technology, Commissioner of Tamil Nadu e-Governance Agency.

Mittal served as a Senior Advisor to Executive Director of World Bank Group. He represented countries like India, Bangladesh, Sri Lanka and Bhutan at the board of the World Bank. He was an active part of corporate governance, voice reform, project approvals and policy formulation of IBRD, IDA, IFC, and MIGA.

From 2018 to 2019, Mittal was an Adjunct Faculty at School of Public Policy, Carnegie Mellon University & taught “Managing change in a disruptive world” at Heinz School of Public Policy. He has also done extensive research on public policy issues at Center for Global Development, Washington DC during this period.

He was previously MD & CEO of Guidance Tamil Nadu.

== Achievements ==
Mittal took initiatives and his recent engagements include Project Arrow in Department of Post, e-Biz project in Department of Commerce, world’s largest Cash Transfer Program in LPG in India (PaHaL) and GiveItUp in Ministry of Petroleum and Natural Gas which leverage technology to simplify processes, improve efficiency, convenience, participation and transparency in Governance. One of his initiative, Project Lakshya, transparency portal that allowed real time visibility of 3 million LPG deliveries per day to LPG consumers received National E-Governance Award.

Biz Buddy is such an initiative realized by Mittal. It is an industry help desk portal with three primary objectives: Streamlined redressal mechanism for timely resolution of industrial investor’s unsolved issues, Tracking and monitoring of investor issues in a real time manner and Improving Tamil Nadu's investment climate by enhancing the aftercare services provided to industrial investors.

== See also ==
- Civil Services of India
