= Kandla–Gorakhpur LPG Pipeline =

LPG pipeline under-construction

Kandla-Gorakhpur Pipeline

Location
- Country: India
- State: Gujarat, Madhya Pradesh and Uttar Pradesh

General information
- Type: LPG
- Status: Under Construction
- Owner: 50% Indian Oil Corporation (IOCL); 25% Bharat Petroleum (BPCL); 25% Hindustan Petroleum (HPCL)
- Construction started: 24 February 2019

Technical information
- Length: 2,805 km (1,743 mi)
- Maximum discharge: 3.75 MMTPA (Millions of Metric Tonnes per Annum)
- Diameter: 20 in (508 mm)

Kandla-Gorakhpur LPG pipeline (KGPL) is a gas pipeline project under construction in India. It has a total length of 2,805 kilometres (1,743 mi), stretching from the Kandla port of Gujarat to the city of Gorakhpur in Uttar Pradesh via Madhya Pradesh.The pipeline is designed for a capacity of 8.25 million metric tonnes per annum (MMTPA) at an estimated cost of ₹10,088 crore. It will source LPG from import terminals at Kandla, Dahej and Pipavav as well as the Koyali and Bina refineries, and is planned to supply 22 bottling plants directly (3 in Gujarat, 6 in Madhya Pradesh and 13 in Uttar Pradesh). It is constructed by IHB Limited, a joint venture company comprising three public sector undertakings (PSUs) in India: the Indian Oil Corporation (IOCL), the Hindustan Petroleum (HPCL), and the Bharat Petroleum (BPCL). The pipeline connects refineries to liquefied petroleum gas (LPG) bottling plants.

== History ==
On 24 February 2019, the Prime Minister of India, Narendra Modi, laid the foundation stone of the pipeline at Gorakhpur.

When work on the pipeline restarted after the COVID-19 pandemic, project engineers estimated it would be complete by the end of 2023. However, technical challenges at the site around Kandla port have caused several delays, moving the estimated start date to mid-2025.

Subsequent delays continued. As of June 2025, physical progress stood at approximately 91% and financial progress around 75%, with total expenditure of about ₹7,500 crore. A short section (approximately 78 km in Gujarat) was commissioned earlier, and limited gas injection began in mid-2025 on sections that had received Petroleum and Explosives Safety Organisation (PESO) approvals (initially ~500 km). The main trunk line from Kandla to Gorakhpur was largely laid and hydro-tested by mid-2025. PNGRB data as of December 2025 recorded 812 km as operating length and 1,945 km under construction, with a then-target of December 2025. India Investment Grid listed a revised completion date of 30 June 2026 (updated June 2026).

== Project detail ==
Total Length: 2,805 km

Gujarat: 1,076 km, Madhya Pradesh': 621 km, Uttar Pradesh': 1,108 km

Line Diameter : 20”, 18”, 16”, 14”, 12”, 10”, 8”

Pumping Stations: Kandla, Mithi Rohar, Viramgam, Dahej, Pipavav, Dumad, BPC Bina Refinery, IPS-1 (Ch. 237: Near Indore)

LPG Sources:

LPG Import Terminals: Kandla, Mundra (at Mithi Rohar), Dahej, Pipavav

Refineries: IOCL’s Koyali Refinery(Gujarat Refinery), BPCL’s Bina Refinery

Bottling Plants
Company	Plant
IOCL	Ahmedabad (Sanand), Lucknow, Allahabad, Ujjain, Bhopal, Kanpur, Varanasi, Gorakhpur
BPCL	Ahmedabad (Hariyala), Indore, Kanpur, Lucknow, Bhopal, Jhansi, Allahabad, Gorakhpur
HPCL	Gandhinagar, Indore, Unnao, Bhopal, Varanasi, Gorakhpur

== See also ==
- HVJ Gas Pipeline
- East West Gas Pipeline (India)
