= HVJ Associates =

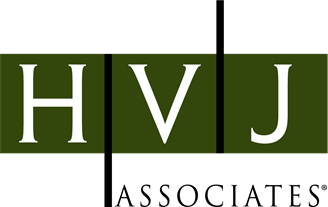
- Industry: Engineering
- Founded: 1985
- Founder: Herb Johnson
- Headquarters: Houston, Texas, United States
- Key people: Herb Johnson
- Website: hvj.com

HVJ Associates is an American geotechnical engineering firm based in Houston, Texas. It is the largest minority-owned firm in Texas.

== History ==
HVJ Associates was founded in 1985 by an African-American civil engineer, Herb Johnson. Johnson has endowed a professorship in the name of Oswald Rendon-Herrero at the Mississippi State University.

In 1994, HVJ was included in Inc. 500 companies.

In 2017, HVJ received ACPA award for concrete-related work.

In 2019, 2020, and 2021, HVJ was included in Engineering News-Record (ENR) Top 500 Design Firms list.

== Franchising ==
HVJ Associates operates a franchising model in which it establishes offices in new locations. The firm implements its operating model and trains the branch manager. Once a revenue threshold is met, the branch is converted into an independently owned franchise through an asset purchase agreement.

== Projects ==
- Grand Parkway
- Houston Galveston Navigation Channel Project
- Scenic Woods Area Sewer Project
