= Petroleum and Natural Gas Regulatory Board =

Indian statutory body

Petroleum and Natural Gas Regulatory Board (PNGRB)
Agency overview
- Formed: 31 March 2006; 20 years ago
- Jurisdiction: Government of India
- Headquarters: New Delhi, India
- Ministers responsible: Hardeep Singh Puri, Minister of Petroleum and Natural Gas; Suresh Gopi, Minister of State for Petroleum and Natural Gas
- Agency executive: Anil Kumar Jain, Chairperson
- Parent department: Ministry of Petroleum and Natural Gas
- Key document: Petroleum and Natural Gas Regulatory Board Act, 2006
- Website: pngrb.gov.in

Petroleum and Natural Gas Regulatory Board (PNGRB) is a statutory body to regulate downstream activities in the petroleum and natural gas sector in India. It was constituted under the act of Parliament of India, namely Petroleum and Natural Gas Regulatory Board Act, 2006. Its primary functions include regulation of refining, transportation, distribution, storage, marketing, supply and sale of petroleum products and natural gas.

== Composition ==
Present composition is as follow

- AK Jain (Former IAS)(Chairman)
- Anjani Kumar Tiwari (Member, Monitoring & Infrastructure)
- A. Ramana Kumar (Member, Commercial)
- Jayanta Narayan Das (Member, Technical)
- Vacant (Member, Legal)

== Collaborations ==
In 2023, PNGRB collaborated with the World Bank to prepare a roadmap for hydrogen blending in natural gas and its transmission through gas pipelines in the country.
