= Oil Industry Safety Directorate =

Technical advisory body in India

The Oil Industry Safety Directorate (OISD) is a technical advisory body in India. It was established in 1986 by the Ministry of Petroleum and Natural Gas. The OISD formulates and implements safety standards for the oil industry.

== Overview ==
The main responsibilities of OISD are:

- Standardization;
- Accident analysis;
- Evaluation of safety performance.

OISD has framed rules and guidelines for safe distances to be observed for various facilities in an oil installation. All the new liquefied petroleum gas (LPG) bottling plants in India are designed based on the guidelines of OISD. OISD has also issued guidelines for the safe operations of petrol stations and standards related to petroleum installations.

== See also ==
- Energy law
- Petroleum and Explosives Safety Organization
- Petrol stations in India
