= Mithi Rohar =

Village in Kutch, Gujarat

Coordinates: 23.101202°N 70.157488°E

Mithi Rohar or Rohar is a village in Gandhidham Taluka of Kutch district of Gujarat, India.

== History ==
Once the village was chief seaport of Anjar district. Now the town is surrounded by industries of Kandla Port.
