= Department of Chemicals and Petro-Chemicals =

- Emblem of India

Agency overview
- Formed: 1991
- Jurisdiction: Republic of India
- Headquarters: Ministry of Chemicals & Fertilisers, Janpath Bhawan, (3rd Floor, B-Wing), Janpath, New Delhi-110001
- Parent agency: Ministry of Chemicals and Fertilisers
- Website: Official website

Department of Chemicals and Petro-Chemicals is an agency of the Indian government established in 1991. The agency is part of the Ministry of Chemicals and Fertilisers. The responsibilities of the departments include policy, planning, development and regulation of Chemicals and Petrochemicals Industries
