= East West Gas Pipeline (India) =

Natural gas pipeline project

Location
- Country: India
- State: Andhra Pradesh, Gujarat
- Direction: East to West
- Start: Kakinada, Andhra Pradesh
- Passes through: Telangana, Karnataka & Maharashtra
- To: Bharuch, Gujarat
- Runs alongside: 18 National Highways, 66 State Highways, 708 roads, 17 railway lines, and 372 rivers & canals.

General information
- Type: Gas Pipeline
- Owner: India Infrastructure Trust
- Contractors: China Petroleum Pipeline Bureau, Punj Lloyd, Stroytransgaz
- Construction started: 2006
- Commissioned: 2008

Technical information
- Length: 1,386 km (861 mi)
- Diameter: 1,219.2 mm (48 in)
- No. of compressor stations: 11

Pipeline Infrastructure Limited or East West Gas Pipeline (EWPL) is a project implemented to transport gas from Kakinada (Andhra Pradesh) to Bharuch (Gujarat) including various spurs and interconnects on the way. EWPL traverses through the Indian states of Andhra Pradesh, Telangana, Karnataka, Maharashtra and Gujarat. EWPL has been authorized as a common carrier pipeline. It is a wholly owned subsidiary of India Infrastructure Trust, which is owned by Brookfield Asset Management.
The East West Gas Pipeline supplies Natural gas to RIL's vast petrochemical complex at Gujarat and delivers gas to numerous customers via branch line connections along its length. The pipeline system features multiple compressor stations, numerous metering facilities at branch take-offs and an advanced control and communications network. The project is the first and largest privately owned cross-country pipeline in India and the backbone of India's burgeoning natural gas grid.

== Gas source ==
The current gas source for EWPL is KG-D6 gas block located in Krishna Godavari Basin, 30 to 50 km offshore of the east coast of India. RIL has set up an Onshore Terminal at Gadimoga near Kakinada.

== System configuration ==
EWPL is a 48 inches (120 cm) uniform diameter (API 5L Grade X-70) pipeline across the entire trunk length of around 1375 km with wall thicknesses 17.2, 20.7 and 25.4 mm depending on the code requirement. The pipeline is 3LPE (three layer polyethylene) coated; internally epoxy lined, helically spiral submerged arc welded (for 17.2 mm) and longitudinal submerged arc welded (for 20.7 mm and 25.4 mm). Impressed current cathodic protection system has been provided to supplement the coating system for protection against external corrosion. Maximum Allowable Operating Pressure (MAOP) of the pipeline is 98.0 bar(g).

== Gas price ==
In 2020, Indian government fixed the natural gas price at producer end (on shore point) as US$4.06 per million British thermal units ($13.85/MWh) on net calorific value (NCV) basis from KG-D6 field. However the enhanced price would be applicable only after compensating the shortfall gas in the previous years. The earlier price of $4.2 per million BTU on gross calorific value (GCV) basis is calculated already at maximum price cap of Brent crude of $60 per barrel (159 liters) under the applicable formula linking the price of gas per million BTU (GP) to the price of oil:

GP = 2.5 + (OP – 25) ^0.15

where OP is the annual average Brent crude price for the previous FY, with a cap of $60 per barrel and a floor of $25 per barrel. As the annual Brent price has always been above $60 from 2007 to 2014, the revised gas price at $5.61 during the year 2014 is in excess of the applicable maximum price by nearly 20%.

== Controversies ==
=== Money laundering ===
EWPL is under investigation by the Indian regulators over potential laundering of $1.2 bn by the company.

== See also ==
- Kandla-Gorakhpur LPG Pipeline
- HVJ Gas Pipeline
