= HVJ Gas Pipeline =

India multistate gas pipeline

HVJ Gas Pipeline એચ.વી.જે ગેસ પાઇપલાઇન एच. वी. जे. लाइन

Location
- Country: India
- State: Gujarat, Madhya Pradesh, Rajasthan, Uttar Pradesh, Haryana and NCT
- Start: Hazira, Gujarat
- Passes through: Vijaipur, Madhya Pradesh
- To: Jagdishpur (Industrial Area), Uttar Pradesh
- Runs alongside: 69 rivers, 300 roads and numerous railway crossings.

General information
- Type: Gas Pipeline
- Owner: Gas Authority of India Limited
- Operator: Gas Authority of India Limited
- Contractors: Various
- Construction started: 1986
- Commissioned: 1987

Technical information
- Length: 3,474.00 km (2,158.64 mi)
- Maximum discharge: 33.4×10^{6} m^{3}/d at ~1 atm
- Diameter: 914.4 mm (36 in)
- No. of compressor stations: 4
- Compressor stations: Hazira, Morena, Vijaipur and Auraiya

HVJ an abbreviation for Hazira-Vijaipur-Jagdishpur (also known as HBJ where B stands for Bijeypur, another name of Vijaipur) is India's first cross state gas pipeline. The project was started in 1984 after the incorporation of GAIL (India) Limited to supply gas to the fertilizer plants located in the state of Uttar Pradesh. The first phase of the project consisting of non-branched 1,750 kilometer grid was commissioned in 1987. Later on the system was expanded with additional branches to supply gas for industrial and domestic use in the states of Rajasthan, Haryana and NCT, which increased the total grid length to 3,474 km.

In year 1998, newly established Indraprastha Gas Limited took control of the Delhi branch of the pipeline to set up a citywide gas grid.

It has branches to Kota in Rajasthan, Shahajahanpur, Babrala and other places in Uttar Pradesh.

== Features of HVJ ==
=== Compressor stations ===
4 compressor stations at Hazira, Jhabua, Vijaipur and Auraiya houses 28 gas turbine powered compressors and 8 gas turbine powered generators to produce electrical power required for operation of the stations (total output for the 4 stations being 101,000 KW). Each compressor station incorporates a gas cooling system, electricity generating sets, firefighting systems, fuel gas metering systems and all necessary instrumentation and control.

=== Terminals ===
Entire grid has 10 terminals each typically composing of gas filtration and heating systems relief, metering and analyzer systems.

=== Telecommunications and SCADA systems ===
The HVJ pipeline system consists of receiving and dispatch terminals for the supply of metered gas, compressor stations for boosting the pressure of gas, the SCADA system to provide central monitoring and control and a dedicated GAILTEL communications system to provide reliable voice and data communication.

== See also ==
- East West Gas Pipeline (India)
- Kandla-Gorakhpur LPG Pipeline
