= Petroleum and Explosives Safety Organization =

Indian government department

- पेट्रोलियम तथा विस्फोटक सुरक्षा संगठन

Agency overview
- Formed: 5 September 1898; 127 years ago
- Jurisdiction: Government of India
- Status: Active
- Headquarters: [DELHI]
- Motto: Safety First
- Agency executive: Shri P. Kumar, Chief Controller of Explosives
- Parent department: Department for Promotion of Industry and Internal Trade (DPIIT)
- Parent Agency: Ministry of Commerce and Industry (India)
- Website: peso.gov.in

The Petroleum and Explosives Safety Organization (PESO) is a department formed by the Government of India under the Department for Promotion of Industry and Internal Trade of the Ministry of Commerce and Industry. The department was established in the 1890s under British rule as the Department of Explosives to administer the Explosives Act, 1884, and later expanded to various other activities. It has come to administer also the Explosive Substances Act, 1908, the Petroleum (Production) Act 1934, and the Inflammable Substances Act, 1952. Its purpose is the control of import, export, transport, storage and usage of petroleum products, explosive materials, flammable materials, pressure vessels, cryogenic vessels, design and installation of all necessary and relevant infrastructure, etc.

PESO is a regulatory authority with autonomous status. The department is headed by Chief Controller of Explosives and is headquartered in Nagpur in the state of Maharashtra. The authority framed various rules like Cinematograph Film Rules, 1948, the Calcium Carbide Rules, 1987, the Gas Cylinder Rules, 2004, the Petroleum Rules, 2002, the Explosives Rules, 2008, the Ammonium Nitrate Rules, 2012, the Static and Mobile Pressure Vessels (Unfired) Rules, 2016, etc.

Its officers are selected by the Union Public Service Commission (UPSC) into the Indian Petroleum and Explosives Safety Service, a central civil services cadre.

== See also ==
- Oil Industry Safety Directorate
