= Indraprastha Gas =

Indian natural gas distribution company

Indraprastha Gas Limited
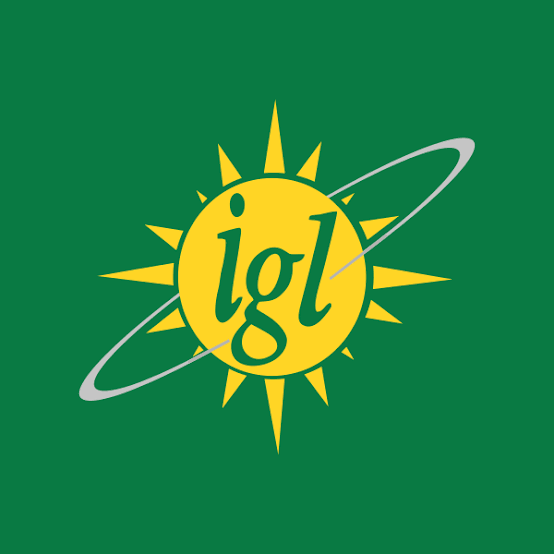
- Company type: Public
- Traded as: BSE: 532514; NSE: IGL
- Industry: Natural gas
- Founded: 1998; 28 years ago
- Headquarters: New Delhi, India
- Area served: Delhi NCR
- Key people: Rakesh Kumar Jain (chairman)
- Products: Piped natural gas Compressed natural gas
- Services: Gas distribution
- Revenue: ▲₹15,717 crore (US$1.6 billion) (FY24)
- Net income: ▲₹1,983 crore (US$210 million) (FY24)
- Website: www.iglonline.net

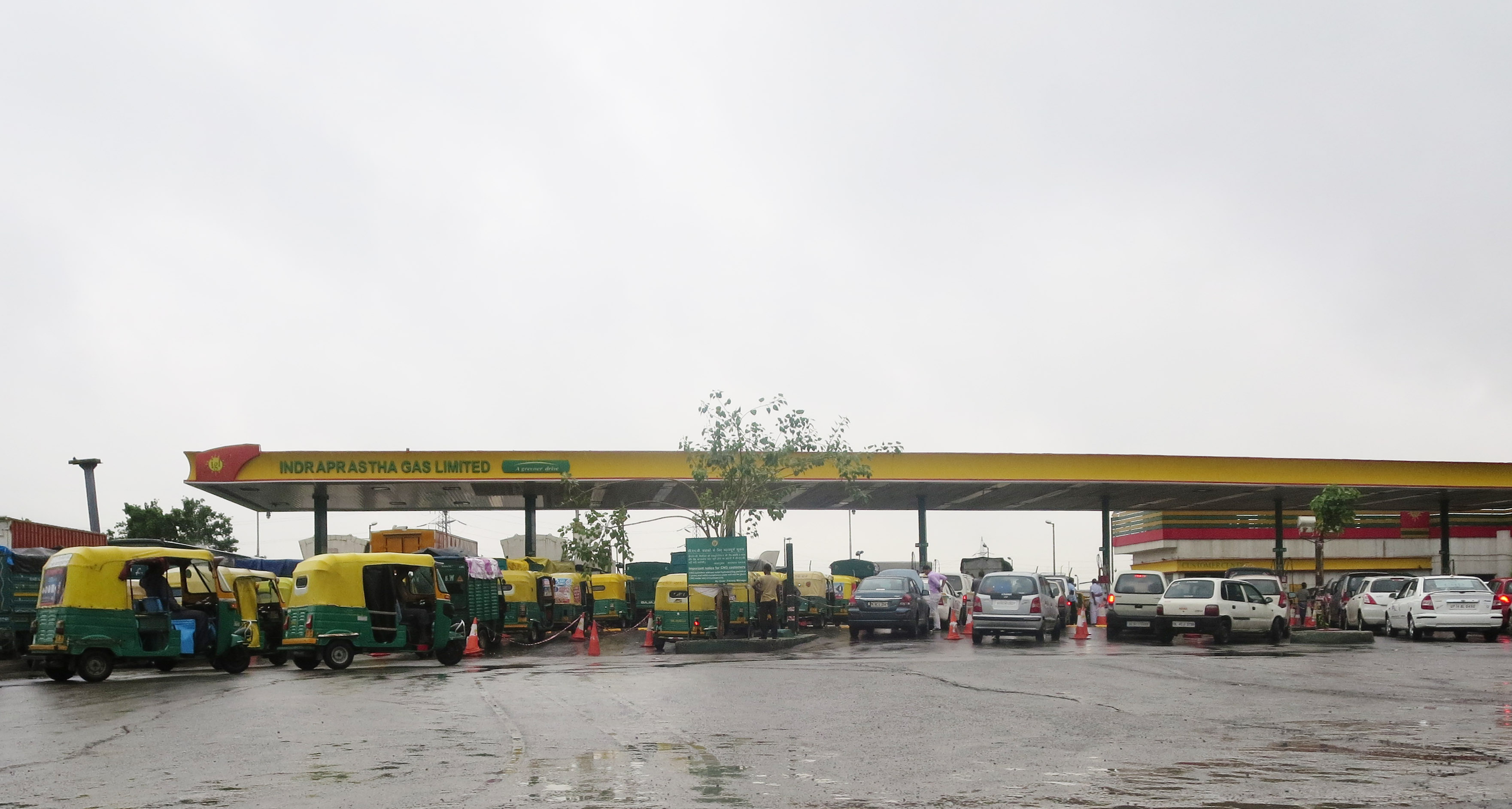
A CNG filling station of Indraprastha Gas in Delhi

Indraprastha Gas Limited (IGL) is an Indian natural gas distribution company that supplies natural gas as cooking and vehicular fuel, primarily in Delhi NCR. Established in 1998, the company is a joint venture between GAIL, Bharat Petroleum, and the Government of Delhi.

== History ==
IGL was incorporated in 1998, to take over and operate the Delhi City Gas Distribution Project from GAIL for laying a network of gas distribution pipelines in Delhi. The company started as a joint venture between GAIL, Bharat Petroleum and the Government of Delhi to implement a city gas distribution network.

The company went public in 2003, listing on the Bombay Stock Exchange and the National Stock Exchange.

== Operations ==
As of 31 December 2017, IGL supplied piped natural gas to over 9,00,000 homes, over 2,000 commercial and more than 1,150 industrial establishments in the NCR. It also operates 425 CNG filling stations for natural gas vehicles.

IGL sources its gas via the HVJ Gas Pipeline owned by GAIL.
