= Aishwarya Oil Fields =

Oil field in India

- Country: India
- Region: Rajasthan
- Location: Barmer district
- Offshore/onshore: Onshore
- Operator: Cairn Energy

Field history
- Start of production: March 2013

Production
- Current production of oil: 30,000 barrels per day (~1.5×10^{6} t/a)
- Year of current production of oil: 2013

Aishwarya oil field is located in Barmer district in Rajasthan state in India. It is India's second biggest oil discovery; Cairn Energy Executives described as a 'living goddess'. It went into production in March 2013 starting off at 30,000 barrels per day. The MBA field is expected to scale up to 200,000 in two years, which will be around 10% of India's total oil consumption. At its peak rate, its production will be equal to around 30% of India's present oil production.
