= Ministry of Petroleum and Natural Gas =

Government ministry of India

- Branch of Government of India

- Ministry of Petroleum & Natural Gas

Agency overview
- Jurisdiction: Government of India
- Headquarters: Kartavya Bhavan-03, Janpath, New Delhi, India
- Annual budget: ₹30,443 crore (US$3.2 billion) (2026–27)
- Minister responsible: Hardeep Singh Puri, Cabinet Minister
- Deputy Minister responsible: Suresh Gopi, Minister of State
- Agency executive: Neeraj Mittal, IAS, Secretary
- Website: mopng.gov.in/en

The Ministry of Petroleum and Natural Gas (MoPNG) is a ministry of the Government of India responsible for the exploration, production, refining, distribution, marketing, import, export, and conservation of petroleum, natural gas, petroleum products, and liquefied natural gas in the country.

The ministry is headed by Cabinet minister Hardeep Singh Puri, while its secretary is Pankaj Jain, a 1990-batch IAS officer of the Assam-Meghalaya cadre. Dharmendra Pradhan, who served from 26 May 2014 to 7 July 2021, is its longest serving minister till date.

== Areas of work ==
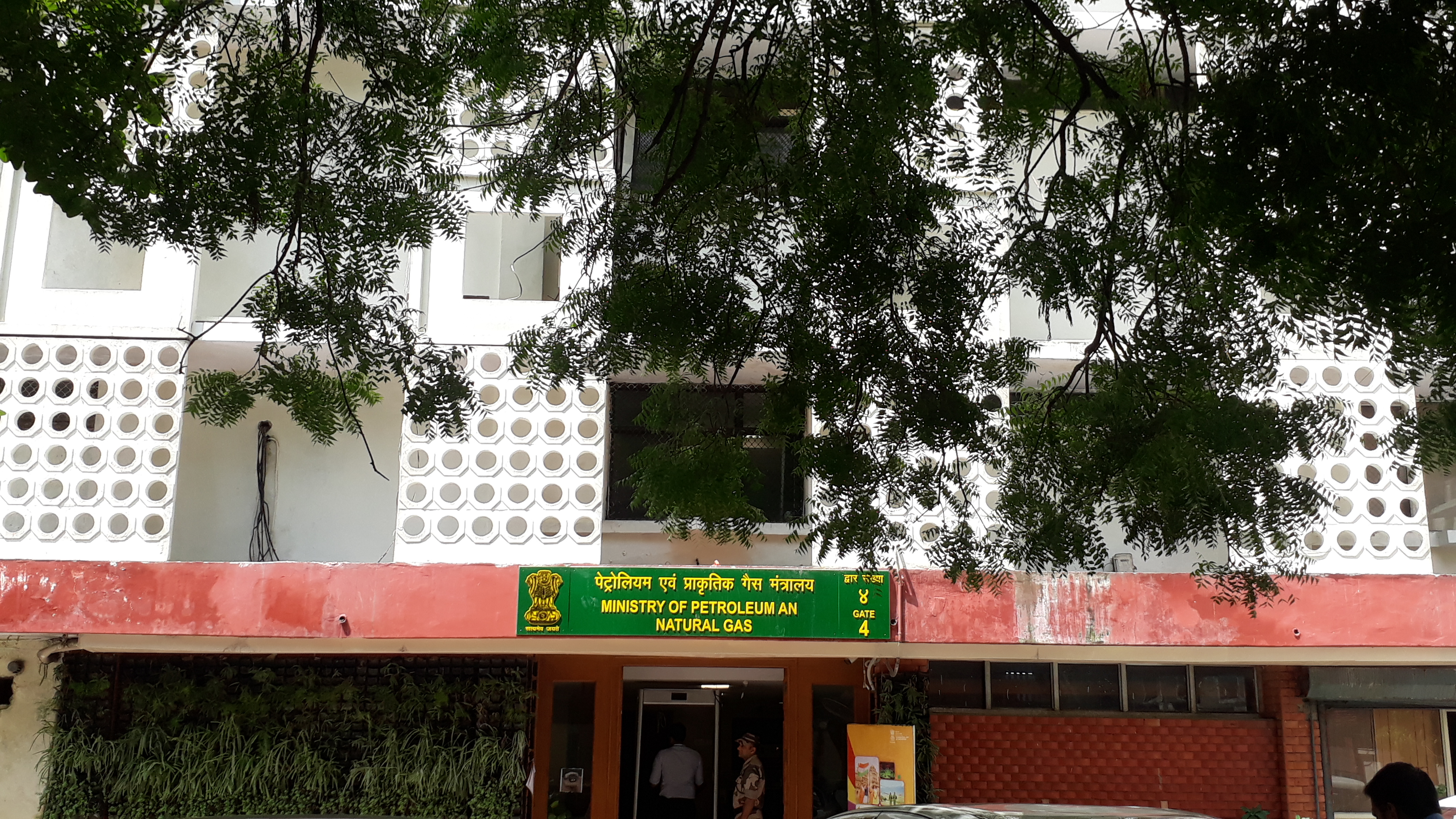
Office of the Ministry of Petroleum and Natural Gas in Shastri Bhwan

- Exploration and exploitation of petroleum resources, including natural gas.
- Production, supply distribution, marketing and pricing of petroleum including natural gas and petroleum products.
- Oil refineries, including Lube plants.
- Additives for petroleum and petroleum products.
- Lube blending and greases.
- Planning, development and control of, and assistance to all industries dealt with by the Ministry.
- All attached or subordinate offices or other organisations concerned with any of the subject specified in this list.
- Planning, development and regulation of oilfield services.
- Public sector projects falling under the subjects included in this list,
- Engineers India limited and IBP Company. together with its subsidiaries, except such projects as are specifically allotted to any other Ministry/Dept,
- Administration of various Central laws relating to Petroleum and Natural Gas

== Divisions ==
- Administration Division
- Bio Refinery Division
- Refinery Division
- International Cooperation Division
- Gas Projects Division
- Exploration Division
- Marketing Division
- General Division
- Finance Division
- Economics & Statistics Division
- Vigilance Division
- Corporate Affairs Desk
- Parliament Cell
- Information Technology Cell
- Pay and Accounts Division

== Autonomous Regulatory and Planning Authorities ==
- Centre For High Technology
- Directorate General of Hydrocarbons.
- Oil Industry Development Board.
- Oil Industry Safety Directorate
- Petroleum Planning And Analysis Cell
- Petroleum and Natural Gas Regulatory Board

== Cabinet Ministers ==
- Note: I/C – Independent Charge

Portrait	Minister (Birth-Death) Constituency	Term of office			Political party	Ministry	Prime Minister
Portrait	Minister (Birth-Death) Constituency	From	To	Period	Political party	Ministry	Prime Minister
Minister of Steel, Mines and Fuel
	Swaran Singh (1907–1994); MP for Jullundur	17 April 1957	10 April 1962	4 years, 358 days	Indian National Congress	Nehru III	Jawaharlal Nehru
Minister of Mines and Fuel
	Keshav Dev Malviya (1904–1981); MP for Domariyaganj (Minister without cabinet rank)	10 April 1962	26 June 1963	1 year, 77 days	Indian National Congress	Nehru IV	Jawaharlal Nehru
	Swaran Singh (1907–1994); MP for Jullundur	26 June 1963	19 July 1963	23 days	Indian National Congress	Nehru IV	Jawaharlal Nehru
	O. V. Alagesan (1911–1992); MP for Chengalpattu (Minister of State)	19 July 1963	21 November 1963	125 days	Indian National Congress	Nehru IV	Jawaharlal Nehru
Minister of Petroleum and Chemicals
	Humayun Kabir (1906–1969); MP for Basirhat	21 November 1963	24 January 1966	2 years, 64 days	Indian National Congress	Nehru IV	Jawaharlal Nehru
	Humayun Kabir (1906–1969); MP for Basirhat	21 November 1963	24 January 1966	2 years, 64 days	Indian National Congress	Nanda I	Gulzarilal Nanda
	Humayun Kabir (1906–1969); MP for Basirhat	21 November 1963	24 January 1966	2 years, 64 days	Indian National Congress	Shastri	Lal Bahadur Shastri
	Humayun Kabir (1906–1969); MP for Basirhat	21 November 1963	24 January 1966	2 years, 64 days	Indian National Congress	Nanda II	Gulzarilal Nanda
	O. V. Alagesan (1911–1992); MP for Chengalpattu (Minister of State)	24 January 1966	13 March 1967	1 year, 48 days	Indian National Congress	Indira I	Indira Gandhi
	Asoka Mehta (1911–1984); MP for Maharashtra (Rajya Sabha)	13 March 1967	22 August 1968	1 year, 162 days	Indian National Congress	Indira II	Indira Gandhi
	Kotha Raghuramaiah (1912–1979); MP for Guntur (Minister of State)	22 August 1968	14 February 1969	176 days	Indian National Congress	Indira II	Indira Gandhi
Minister of Petroleum, Chemicals, Mines and Metals
	Triguna Sen (1905–1998); MP for Tripura (Rajya Sabha)	14 February 1969	18 March 1971	2 years, 32 days	Indian National Congress (R)	Indira II	Indira Gandhi
Minister of Petroleum, Chemicals and Non-ferrous Metals
	Dajisaheb Chavan (1916–1973); MP for Karad (Minister of State)	18 March 1971	2 May 1971	45 days	Indian National Congress (R)	Indira III	Indira Gandhi
Minister of Petroleum and Chemicals
	Prakash Chandra Sethi (1919–1996); MP for Indore (Minister of State)	2 May 1971	29 January 1972	272 days	Indian National Congress (R)	Indira III	Indira Gandhi
	H. R. Gokhale (1915–1978); MP for Mumbai North West	29 January 1972	5 February 1973	1 year, 7 days	Indian National Congress (R)	Indira III	Indira Gandhi
	D. K. Barooah (1914–1996); MP for Assam (Rajya Sabha)	5 February 1973	10 October 1974	1 year, 247 days	Indian National Congress (R)	Indira III	Indira Gandhi
	Keshav Dev Malviya (1904–1981); MP for Domariyaganj	10 October 1974	24 December 1975	1 year, 75 days	Indian National Congress (R)	Indira III	Indira Gandhi
Minister of Petroleum
	Keshav Dev Malviya (1904–1981); MP for Domariyaganj	24 December 1975	24 March 1977	1 year, 90 days	Indian National Congress (R)	Indira III	Indira Gandhi
Minister of Petroleum, Chemicals and Fertilizers
	Hemwati Nandan Bahuguna (1919–1989); MP for Lucknow	29 March 1977	15 July 1977	108 days	Janata Party	Desai	Morarji Desai
	Morarji Desai (1896–1995); MP for Surat (Prime Minister)	16 July 1979	28 July 1979	12 days	Janata Party	Desai	Morarji Desai
	T. A. Pai (1922–1981); MP for Udipi	28 July 1979	19 August 1979	22 days	Indian National Congress (U)	Charan	Charan Singh
	Aravinda Bala Pajanor (1935–2013); MP for Pondicherry	19 August 1979	26 December 1979	129 days	All India Anna Dravida Munnetra Kazhagam	Charan	Charan Singh
	Shyam Nath Kacker (born unknown); Unelected	26 December 1979	14 January 1980	19 days	Janata Party (Secular)	Charan	Charan Singh
Minister of Petroleum and Chemicals
	Prakash Chandra Sethi (1919–1996); MP for Indore	16 January 1980	7 March 1980	51 days	Indian National Congress	Indira IV	Indira Gandhi
	Veerendra Patil (1924–1997); MP for Bagalkot	7 March 1980	19 October 1980	226 days	Indian National Congress	Indira IV	Indira Gandhi
Minister of Petroleum, Chemicals and Fertilizers
	Prakash Chandra Sethi (1919–1996); MP for Indore	19 October 1980	15 January 1982	1 year, 88 days	Indian National Congress	Indira IV	Indira Gandhi
	P. Shiv Shankar (1929–2017); MP for Secunderabad	15 January 1982	2 September 1982	230 days	Indian National Congress	Indira IV	Indira Gandhi
Bifurcated into the Ministry of Chemicals and Fertilizers and the Department of Petroleum under the Ministry of Energy
Minister of Petroleum
	Nawal Kishore Sharma (1925–2012); MP for Jaipur (Minister of State, I/C)	31 December 1984	25 September 1985	268 days	Indian National Congress	Rajiv II	Rajiv Gandhi
Minister of Petroleum and Natural Gas
	Nawal Kishore Sharma (1925–2012); MP for Jaipur (Minister of State, I/C)	25 September 1985	20 January 1986	117 days	Indian National Congress	Rajiv II	Rajiv Gandhi
	Chandrashekhar Singh (1927–1986); MP for Banka (Minister of State, I/C)	20 January 1986	24 June 1986	155 days	Indian National Congress	Rajiv II	Rajiv Gandhi
	N. D. Tiwari (1925–2018); MP for Uttar Pradesh (Rajya Sabha)	24 June 1986	22 October 1986	120 days	Indian National Congress	Rajiv II	Rajiv Gandhi
	Brahm Dutt (1926–2014); MP for Tehri Garhwal (Minister of State, I/C)	22 October 1986	2 December 1989	3 years, 41 days	Indian National Congress	Rajiv II	Rajiv Gandhi
Minister of Petroleum and Chemicals
	M. S. Gurupadaswamy (1924–2011); MP for Uttar Pradesh (Rajya Sabha)	6 December 1989	10 November 1990	339 days	Janata Dal	Vishwanath	Vishwanath Pratap Singh
	Satya Prakash Malaviya (1934–2018); MP for Uttar Pradesh (Rajya Sabha)	21 November 1990	21 June 1991	212 days	Samajwadi Janata Party (Rashtriya)	Chandra Shekhar	Chandra Shekhar
Minister of Petroleum and Natural Gas
	B. Shankaranand (1925–2009); MP for Chikkodi	21 June 1991	18 January 1993	1 year, 211 days	Indian National Congress	Rao	P. V. Narasimha Rao
	Captain; Satish Sharma (1947–2021); MP for Amethi (Minister of State, I/C)	18 January 1993	16 May 1996	3 years, 119 days	Indian National Congress	Rao	P. V. Narasimha Rao
	Atal Bihari Vajpayee (1924–2018); MP for Lucknow (Prime Minister)	16 May 1996	1 June 1996	16 days	Bharatiya Janata Party	Vajpayee I	Self
	H. D. Deve Gowda (born 1933); MP for Karnataka (Rajya Sabha) (Prime Minister)	1 June 1996	21 April 1997	324 days	Janata Dal	Deve Gowda	Self
	Inder Kumar Gujral (1919–2012); MP for Bihar (Rajya Sabha) (Prime Minister)	21 April 1997	9 June 1997	49 days	Janata Dal	Gujral	Inder Kumar Gujral
	Janeshwar Mishra (1933–2010); MP for Uttar Pradesh (Rajya Sabha)	9 June 1997	19 March 1998	283 days	Samajwadi Party	Gujral	Inder Kumar Gujral
	Vazhappady K. Ramamurthy (1940–2002); MP for Salem	19 March 1998	13 October 1999	1 year, 208 days	Tamizhaga Rajiv Congress	Vajpayee II	Atal Bihari Vajpayee
	Ram Naik (born 1934); MP for Mumbai North	13 October 1999	22 May 2004	4 years, 222 days	Bharatiya Janata Party	Vajpayee III	Atal Bihari Vajpayee
	Mani Shankar Aiyar (born 1941); MP for Mayiladuthurai	23 May 2004	29 January 2006	1 year, 251 days	Indian National Congress	Manmohan I	Manmohan Singh
	Murli Deora (1937–2014); Rajya MP for Maharashtra	29 January 2006	22 May 2009	4 years, 349 days	Indian National Congress	Manmohan I	Manmohan Singh
	Murli Deora (1937–2014); Rajya MP for Maharashtra	28 May 2009	19 January 2011	4 years, 349 days	Indian National Congress	Manmohan II	Manmohan Singh
	S. Jaipal Reddy (1942–2019); MP for Chevella	19 January 2011	28 October 2012	1 year, 283 days	Indian National Congress	Manmohan II	Manmohan Singh
	Veerappa Moily (born 1940); MP for Chikballapur	28 October 2012	26 May 2014	1 year, 210 days	Indian National Congress	Manmohan II	Manmohan Singh
	Dharmendra Pradhan (born 1969); MP for Bihar (Rajya Sabha), until 2018; MP for Madhya Pradesh (Rajya Sabha), from 2018 (Minister of State, I/C until 3 Sep 2017)	27 May 2014	30 May 2019	7 years, 41 days	Bharatiya Janata Party	Modi I	Narendra Modi
	Dharmendra Pradhan (born 1969); MP for Bihar (Rajya Sabha), until 2018; MP for Madhya Pradesh (Rajya Sabha), from 2018 (Minister of State, I/C until 3 Sep 2017)	31 May 2019	7 July 2021	7 years, 41 days	Bharatiya Janata Party	Modi II	Narendra Modi
	Hardeep Singh Puri (born 1952); MP for Uttar Pradesh (Rajya Sabha)	7 July 2021	9 June 2024	5 years, 81 days	Bharatiya Janata Party	Modi II	Narendra Modi
	Hardeep Singh Puri (born 1952); MP for Uttar Pradesh (Rajya Sabha)	10 June 2024	Incumbent	5 years, 81 days	Bharatiya Janata Party	Modi III	Narendra Modi

== Ministers of State ==
Portrait	Minister (Birth-Death) Constituency	Term of office			Political party	Ministry	Prime Minister
Portrait	Minister (Birth-Death) Constituency	From	To	Period	Political party	Ministry	Prime Minister
Minister of State for Steel, Mines and Fuel
	Keshav Dev Malviya (1904–1981); MP for Domariyaganj; Minister of Mines and Oil from 25 Apr 1957	17 April 1957	10 April 1962	4 years, 358 days	Indian National Congress	Nehru III	Jawaharlal Nehru
Minister of State for Petroleum and Chemicals
	O. V. Alagesan (1911–1992); MP for Chengalpattu	21 November 1963	24 January 1966	2 years, 64 days	Indian National Congress	Nehru IV	Jawaharlal Nehru
	O. V. Alagesan (1911–1992); MP for Chengalpattu	21 November 1963	24 January 1966	2 years, 64 days	Indian National Congress	Nanda I	Gulzarilal Nanda
	O. V. Alagesan (1911–1992); MP for Chengalpattu	21 November 1963	24 January 1966	2 years, 64 days	Indian National Congress	Shastri	Lal Bahadur Shastri
	O. V. Alagesan (1911–1992); MP for Chengalpattu	21 November 1963	24 January 1966	2 years, 64 days	Indian National Congress	Nanda II	Gulzarilal Nanda
	Kotha Raghuramaiah (1912–1979); MP for Guntur	18 March 1967	22 August 1968	1 year, 157 days	Indian National Congress	Indira II	Indira Gandhi
Minister of State for Petroleum, Chemicals, Mines and Metals
	Jagannath Rao (1909–?); MP for Chatrapur	14 February 1969	27 June 1970	1 year, 133 days	Indian National Congress (R)	Indira II	Indira Gandhi
	Dajisaheb Chavan (1916–1973); MP for Karad	14 February 1969	18 March 1971	2 years, 32 days	Indian National Congress (R)	Indira II	Indira Gandhi
	Nitiraj Singh Chaudhary (1909–1988); MP for Narmadapuram	26 June 1970	18 March 1971	265 days	Indian National Congress (R)	Indira II	Indira Gandhi
Minister of State for Petroleum, Chemicals and Non-ferrous Metals
	Nitiraj Singh Chaudhary (1909–1988); MP for Narmadapuram	18 March 1971	2 May 1971	45 days	Indian National Congress (R)	Indira III	Indira Gandhi
Minister of State for Petroleum and Chemicals
	Shah Nawaz Khan (1914–1993); MP for Meerut	9 November 1973	10 October 1974	335 days	Indian National Congress (R)	Indira III	Indira Gandhi
	K. R. Ganesh (1922–2004); MP for Andaman and Nicobar Islands	10 October 1974	1 December 1975	1 year, 52 days	Indian National Congress (R)	Indira III	Indira Gandhi
Minister of State for Petroleum, Chemicals and Fertilizers
	Janeshwar Mishra (1933–2010); MP for Prayagraj	14 August 1977	11 July 1978	331 days	Janata Party	Desai	Morarji Desai
	Narsingh Yadav; MP for Chandauli	26 January 1979	15 July 1979	170 days	Janata Party	Desai	Morarji Desai
	Saugata Roy (born 1946); MP for Barrackpore	4 August 1979	14 January 1980	163 days	Indian National Congress (U)	Charan	Charan Singh
Minister of State for Petroleum and Chemicals
	Chaudhary Dalbir Singh (1926–1987); MP for Sirsa	8 June 1980	19 October 1980	133 days	Indian National Congress	Indira IV	Indira Gandhi
Minister of State for Petroleum, Chemicals and Fertilizers
	Chaudhary Dalbir Singh (1926–1987); MP for Sirsa	19 October 1980	2 September 1982	1 year, 318 days	Indian National Congress	Indira IV	Indira Gandhi
Minister of State for Petroleum and Natural Gas
	Sushila Rohatgi (1921–2011); Rajya Sabha MP for Uttar Pradesh	24 June 1986	22 October 1986	120 days	Indian National Congress (I)	Rajiv IV	Rajiv Gandhi
Minister of State for Petroleum and Chemicals
	Bhajaman Behara (born 1943); MP for Dhenkanal	23 April 1990	10 November 1990	201 days	Janata Dal	Vishwanath	Vishwanath Pratap Singh
Minister of State for Petroleum and Natural Gas
	S. Krishna Kumar (born 1939); MP for Quilon	21 June 1991	18 January 1993	1 year, 211 days	Indian National Congress	Rao	P. V. Narasimha Rao
	T. R. Baalu (born 1941); MP for Chennai South	6 July 1996	19 March 1998	1 year, 256 days	Dravida Munnetra Kazhagam	Deve Gowda	H. D. Deve Gowda
	T. R. Baalu (born 1941); MP for Chennai South	6 July 1996	19 March 1998	1 year, 256 days	Dravida Munnetra Kazhagam	Gujral	Inder Kumar Gujral
	Santosh Kumar Gangwar (born 1948); MP for Bareilly	20 March 1998	13 October 1999	1 year, 207 days	Bharatiya Janata Party	Vajpayee II	Atal Bihari Vajpayee
	E. Ponnuswamy (born 1936); MP for Chidambaram	13 October 1999	7 February 2001	1 year, 117 days	Pattali Makkal Katchi	Vajpayee III	Atal Bihari Vajpayee
	Santosh Kumar Gangwar (born 1948); MP for Bareilly	22 November 1999	24 May 2003	3 years, 183 days	Bharatiya Janata Party	Vajpayee III	Atal Bihari Vajpayee
	Sumitra Mahajan (born 1943); MP for Indore	24 May 2003	22 May 2004	364 days	Bharatiya Janata Party	Vajpayee III	Atal Bihari Vajpayee
	E. V. K. S. Elangovan (born 1948); MP for Gobichettipalayam	23 May 2004	25 May 2004	2 days	Indian National Congress	Manmohan I	Manmohan Singh
	Dinsha Patel (born 1937); MP for Kheda	29 January 2006	22 May 2009	3 years, 113 days	Indian National Congress	Manmohan I	Manmohan Singh
	Jitin Prasada (born 1973); MP for Dhaurahra	28 May 2009	19 January 2011	1 year, 236 days	Indian National Congress	Manmohan II	Manmohan Singh
	R. P. N. Singh (born 1964); MP for Kushi Nagar	19 January 2011	28 October 2012	1 year, 283 days	Indian National Congress	Manmohan II	Manmohan Singh
	Panabaka Lakshmi (born 1958); MP for Bapatla	31 October 2012	26 May 2014	1 year, 207 days	Indian National Congress	Manmohan II	Manmohan Singh
	Rameswar Teli (born 1970); MP for Dibrugarh	7 July 2021	9 June 2024	2 years, 338 days	Bharatiya Janata Party	Modi II	Narendra Modi
	Suresh Gopi (born 1958); MP for Thrissur	10 June 2024	Incumbent	2 years, 108 days	Bharatiya Janata Party	Modi III	Narendra Modi

== Public sector undertakings ==
The ministry has ownership over these public sector undertakings (PSUs) of the government of India.

- Balmer Lawrie & Co. Limited (BL)
- Bharat Petroleum Corporation Limited (BPCL)
- Engineers India Limited (EIL)
- GAIL (India) Limited (GAIL)
  - Assam Valley Fertilizer and Chemical Company Limited (AVFCCL)
  - Brahmaputra Cracker and Polymer Limited (BCPL)
- Indian Oil Corporation Limited (IOCL)
  - Chennai Petroleum Corporation Limited (CPCL)
- Numaligarh Refinery Limited (NRL)
- Oil India Limited (OIL)
- Oil and Natural Gas Corporation Limited (ONGC)
  - Hindustan Petroleum Corporation Limited (HPCL)
  - Mangalore Refinery and Petrochemicals Limited (MRPL)

== Research institutes ==
=== Rajiv Gandhi Institute of Petroleum Technology ===
RGIPT is a training and education institute that gives technical and management training to the petroleum industry and was formally opened in July 2008. The Ministry of Petroleum and Natural Gas (MOP&NG), Government of India founded the institute through an Act of Parliament ("Rajiv Gandhi Institute of Petroleum Technology Act 2007").

==== Campuses ====
- Jais Campus: Started academic sessions in June 2008 at a temporary campus at Rae Bareli. On 15 October 2016, the institute moved from temporary campus to the permanent campus at Jais.
- Noida Campus: Besides main center at Jais, Amethi, the RGIPT also have this campus for MBA and related courses.
- Assam Campus: New campus is under construction at Sivasagar, Assam. In consonance with the charter of RGIPT, the primary objective of the Assam Center of RGIPT is envisaged to offer programmes of education and training of skilled technical manpower at the diploma and advance diploma levels including B.Sc. - M.Sc. integrated courses in various areas in the domain of the petroleum sector as per requirements of the oil, gas and petrochemical industry. On 13 May 2017, Chief Minister of Assam Sarbananda Sonowal and Minister of Petroleum and Natural Gas Shri Dharmendra Pradhan jointly launched the full swing construction work of second campus at Sivasagar, Assam.
- Bangalore Campus: In July 2013, Karnataka government agreed to offer 200 acres of land to set up the Bangalore centre which is going to be the Asia's first centre on fire and safety for oil and gas sector. The institute will start functioning from 2018-19 academic year and it is purely for research in energy policy and science and technology as it is related to petroleum and energy. The institute coming up will cost Rs.1,000 crore.

=== Indian Institute of Petroleum and Energy ===
Indian Institute of Petroleum and Energy (IIPE), Visakhapatnam, a domain-specific Institute at par with IITs and IIMs, is established by the Government of India under the aegis of the Ministry of Petroleum and Natural Gas (MoPNG) in the year 2016. The Indian Institute of Petroleum and Energy Act, 2017 (No.3 of 2018) enacted by the Parliament and declared the Institute as an 'Institution of National Importance'. IIPE has achieved this prestigious status by joining with the major oil and gas corporations such as HPCL, IOCL, ONGC, OIL & GAIL.

IIPE is a research focussed Institute with an emphasis on the emerging areas in the energy sectors, namely Shale Gas, Coal Bed Methane, Gas Hydrates, Conventional Energy Sources, Renewable Energy Sources, Storage, and downstream activities of oil & gas. A primary goal of research at IIPE has been to meet the country's fossil fuel and renewable energy demands.

The Institute presently offers 4-year B.Tech courses in Petroleum, Chemical and Mechanical Engineering based on JEE (Advanced) rankings and MSc Applied Geology and Ph.D. programmes. The Institute is presently operating its academic activities from its temporary campus. The Institute has its own state-of-the-art laboratories, research infrastructure, e-library, etc. The permanent campus of IIPE is being constructed in the beautiful and natural environment of hilly ranges in the Anakapalli district in Andhra Pradesh.

== See also ==
- Electricity sector in India
- Energy law
- Nuclear power in India
- Oil Industry Safety Directorate
- Oil and gas industry in India
- Solar power in India
- Wind power in India
- Renewable energy in India
