= List of oil refineries in India =

After the discovery of oil in the Assam state of India in late 1880s, the first oil refinery was set up at Digboi. Digboi Refinery was commissioned in 1901. Following is a list of oil refineries in India, per the Petroleum Planning and Analysis Cell of the Ministry of Petroleum and Natural Gas, Government of India, arranged in decreasing order of their capacity.

As a group, Indian Oil Corporation has the largest refining capacity, with nine refineries located across western, northern and north-eastern regions of India. The Jamnagar Refinery by Reliance Industries Limited is the largest refinery in the world and has the largest Nelson Complexity Index in India of 21.1. Various refineries are undergoing capacity expansions, and the Pachpadra Refinery got commissioned in 2026.

== List ==
No.	Refinery	Owner	Sector	State	Location	Commissioned	Capacity (10^{6} tonnes/y)	Nelson Complexity Index
1	Jamnagar Refinery	Reliance Industries	Private	Gujarat	Jamnagar (SEZ)	14 July 1999	35.4	21.1
2	Vadinar Refinery	Nayara Energy	Private	Gujarat	Vadinar	1 May 2008	20	11.8
3	Kochi Refinery	Bharat Petroleum	Public	Kerala	Kochi	27 April 1963	15.5	10.8
4	Mangalore Refinery	ONGC	Public	Karnataka	Mangalore	7 March 1988	15	10.6
5	Paradip Refinery	Indian Oil	Public	Odisha	Paradip	7 February 2016	15	12.2
6	Panipat Refinery	Indian Oil	Public	Haryana	Panipat	July 1998	15 (capacity expanding to 25)	10.5
7	Gujarat Refinery	Indian Oil	Public	Gujarat	Vadodara	11 October 1965	13.7 (capacity expanding to 18)	10.0
8	Mumbai Refinery	Bharat Petroleum	Public	Maharashtra	Mumbai	January 1955	12	5.6
9	Guru Gobind Singh Refinery	HPCL-Mittal Energy Limited	Joint venture	Punjab	Bathinda	March 2012	11.3	12.6
10	Manali Refinery	CPCL (Indian Oil)	Public	Tamil Nadu	Chennai	27 September 1969	10.5	9.5
11	Visakhapatnam Refinery	Hindustan Petroleum	Public	Andhra Pradesh	Visakhapatnam	1957	8.3 (capacity expanding to 15)	7.8
12	Mathura Refinery	Indian Oil	Public	Uttar Pradesh	Mathura	19 January 1982	8	8.4
13	Haldia Refinery	Indian Oil	Public	West Bengal	Haldia	1 January 1975	8	10.4
14	Bina Refinery	Bharat Petroleum	Public	Madhya Pradesh	Bina	11 May 2011	7.8	11.58
15	Mumbai Refinery	Hindustan Petroleum	Public	Maharashtra	Mumbai	1954	9.5	10.4
16	Barauni Refinery	Indian Oil	Public	Bihar	Barauni	July 1964	6 (capacity expanding to 9)	7.8
17	Numaligarh Refinery	Oil India; Government of Assam	Public	Assam	Numaligarh	1 October 2000	3 (capacity expanding to 9	9.6
18	Bongaigaon Refinery	Indian Oil	Public	Assam	Bongaigaon	20 February 1974	2.35	8.2
19	Guwahati Refinery	Indian Oil	Public	Assam	Guwahati	1 January 1962	1	6.7
20	Nagapattnam Refinery	CPCL (Indian Oil)	Public	Tamil Nadu	Nagapattinam	November 1993	1 (capacity expanding to 9)	7.9
21	Tatipaka Refinery	ONGC	Public	Andhra Pradesh	Tatipaka	3 September 2001	1	NA
22	Digboi Refinery	Indian Oil	Public	Assam	Digboi	11 December 1901	0.65 (capacity expanding to 1)	11
23	Pachpadra Refinery	•HPCL •Government of Rajasthan	Public	Rajasthan	Pachpadra	4 July 2026	9	17

== Upcoming refineries ==
Project	Fuel type	Location	Status	Notes
ONGC Refinery	Oil	Prayagraj	Planned	ONGC is building megarefinery in Prayagraj.
RRPCL Refinery	Oil	Ratnagiri	Proposed	
Panipat 3G Ethanol Refinery	Ethanol	Panipat	Under construction	It is world's first 3G ethanol refinery designed by Praj Industries and owned by Indian Oil Corporation
Bhatinda Ethanol Refinery	Ethanol	Bhatinda	Under construction	It is 2G ethanol refinery designed by Praj Industries and owned by HPCL Biofuels Ltd in Bhatinda
Vidarbha Refinery	Oil	Maharashtra	Proposed	EIL will conduct feasibility study for petrochemical complex in Vidarbha.
New BPCL Refinery	Oil	TBD	Proposed	
BPCL Seaport Refinery, Machilipatnam	Oil	Andhra Pradesh	Proposed	
Bargarh Refinery	Ethanol	Odisha	Under construction	BPCL's 2G ethanol bio-refinery in Bargarh, Odisha, would provide momentum to India's green and sustainable growth.
Cuddalore Refinery	Oil	Tamil Nadu	To be Converted in to Petrochemical Plant	Haldia Petrochemicals is planning to convert the under-construction 18000 cr refinary project in to a Petrochemical Plant.

== Location map ==
Locations of various oil refineries in India
- Public sector
- Private sector
- Joint venture
- Upcoming

== See also ==
- Global high ranking of India in oil refinement
- History of the oil industry in India
- Energy in India
