= Petrowatch =

Newsletter about the Indian oil industry

Petrowatch.com
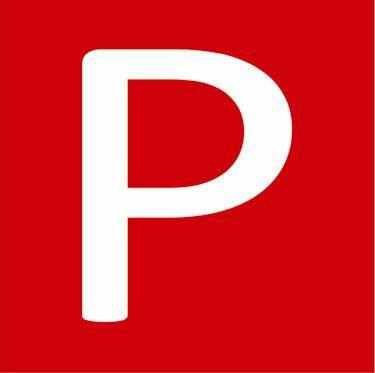
- Type: Market intelligence
- Format: Fortnightly newsletter
- Founder: Deepak Mehta
- Staff writers: 8
- Founded: February 1997
- Website: www.petrowatch.com

Petrowatch is an English-language market intelligence newsletter on the Indian oil industry, published uninterrupted since February 1997.

Petrowatch has been cited by the BBC, The New York Times, The Wall Street Journal, Forbes India, and the Financial Times for its coverage of the Indian oil industry, the Ministry of Petroleum and Natural Gas, the Directorate General of Hydrocarbons, and the Petroleum and Natural Gas Regulatory Board.

In addition, Petrowatch has been cited several times by Japanese investment bank Nomura, most recently in its India Gas Report published in February 2015 on Liquefied Natural Gas importer Petronet LNG.

== VK Sibal and DGH controversy ==
In 2008 the Directorate General of Hydrocarbons, the upstream technical arm of the Ministry of Petroleum and Natural Gas, complained about Petrowatch coverage of the NELP-VII licensing round for the auction of 57 exploration blocks where the newsletter said attracting new companies to India would be difficult.

In 2009 Petrowatch was engaged in a dispute with VK Sibal, director general of the DGH, during which Sibal advised Canadian explorer Canoro Resources and other foreign companies interested in the Indian oil industry to unsubscribe from the website immediately. In his letter Sibal said Petrowatch falsely alleged that there had been a raid by India's Central Bureau of Investigation law enforcement agency on the DGH office and that Petrowatch was engaged in "crass yellow journalism" and publishing misleading information.

In July 2011 Sibal was investigated by the CBI for his alleged favouritism towards Reliance Industries ahead of its $5.69bn development of the KG-D6 gasfield in the Krishna Godavari Basin on India's East Coast.

== Leakgate 2015 ==
In February 2015 Petrowatch was implicated in the "Leakgate" controversy over the theft of classified government correspondence from the Indian oil ministry, leading to an apology from the Indian financial daily Business Standard newspaper, after it emerged that the newspaper had wrongly referred to Petrowatch.com as among paid websites that uploaded government documents.

Since 2011 Petrowatch articles on the leak and theft of confidential government documents by oil ministry personnel on behalf of corporate bodies and parallel oil and gas websites for as little as Rs500 ($10) for a cabinet note or Rs50,000/mth ($1000) for a regular stream of classified information had been largely ignored.

Following the Leakgate scandal, Petrowatch head of operations Vivek Mahajan published a code of conduct detailing its remit and the ethical news-gathering policy followed by its journalists. In its code of conduct Petrowatch makes it clear that no one expects bribes from its reporters or staff or advises them to undertake corrupt activity knowing that any such suggestion will be published for industry at large.

== See also ==
- Business Standard
