= Pachpadra Refinery =

Refinery & Petrochemical complex in Pachpadra, India

HPCL Rajasthan Refinery (HRRL)
- Location within Rajasthan
- Location: Pachpadra, Balotra district, Rajasthan, India; 25.94364°N 72.203672°E

Refinery details
- Operator: HPCL Rajasthan Refinery Limited (HRRL)
- Owners: HPCL(74%); Government of Rajasthan(26%)
- Opened: July 4, 2026; 4 months ago
- Capacity: 9×10^{6} tonne/annum (refining); 2×10^{6} tonne/annum (petrochemicals)
- Website: www.hrrl.in

HPCL Rajasthan Refinery Limited, also known as Pachpadra Refinery is a public sector refinery and petrochemical complex in the Pachpadra (now Balotra district) of Rajasthan, India. It is a joint venture between Hindustan Petroleum Corporation Limited (HPCL) and the Government of Rajasthan, with an equity participation of 74% and 26%, respectively. This refinery will be connected with Jamnagar Refinery and Bathinda Refinery through the Amritsar–Jamnagar Expressway.

== Developments ==
The government will set up petrochemicals hub near the refinery. High level infrastructure for petroleum, chemicals and petrochemicals has begun to develop near the refinery. An area of 100 sq km has been identified near the refinery to build a processing unit and large industries have started.

The refinery was designed and planned by Engineers India Limited(EIL).The construction of the refinery was done by Megha Engineering and Infrastructures Ltd.

In October 2025, the Jodhpur Division of North Western Railway finalized plans to connect Pachpadra Refinery to the railway network, which is expected to support freight transport and regional development in Rajasthan.

== Construction and capacity ==
The foundation stones of the project were laid on 18 September 2013 by then Indian National Congress president Sonia Gandhi and was planned to be completed by Jan 2024. But the construction was started in 2017 and was inaugurated by Indian prime minister Narendra Modi on July 4, 2026.

The project has planned capacity of 9 million tonne per year of refining capacity and 2 million tonne per year of petrochemical complex capacity. It will be spread across 4,400.4 acres (1,780.8 ha) of land.

The facility will have 29 process units, such as a 9 MMTPA crude distillation unit, 4.8 MMTPA vacuum distillation unit, 1.8 MMTPA naphtha hydrotreater unit, a diesel hydrotreater unit at 4.1 MMTPA, a delayed coker unit with capacity 2.4 MMTPA, vacuum gas oil hydrotreater with a capacity of 3.5 MMTPA and a fluidised catalytic cracking unit of 2.9 MMTPA. Engineers India Limited (EIL) is involved in the Rajasthan Refinery Project's Mechanical Completion of the Compressed Air & Cryogenic Nitrogen Plant, Crude Distillation Unit (CDU) and Vacuum Distillation Unit (VDU) site in Barmer, India. EIL, along with HPCL and Tata Projects Limited, has achieved milestones in the project, including casting the raft for the TS - 5 and the footing of 3400 M3. EIL has also successfully erected the VGO HDT Reactor. Other units include an Isomerisation unit, a dual-feed cracker unit, an ethylene recovery unit, two polyethylene units and two polypropylene units. The polypropylene units will use Lummus' Novolen process reactors and Novolen high performance catalyst.

Contractors who were selected for various units were:

- Petro Fluidised Catalytic Cracking Unit - L&T Hydrocarbon Engineering
- Dual Feed Cracker Unit - L&T Hydrocarbon Engineering
- Crude and Vacuum distillation unit (CDU-VDU) - Tata Projects
- Delayed coker unit with unsaturated LPG treating unit - Tata Projects
- Vacuum gas oil hydrotreating unit - Tata Projects
- MS Block Naphtha Hydrotreating Unit, Naphtha Isomerisation Unit and PFCC Gasoline Hydrotreating Unit - Technip Energies

== Financing and outcomes ==
Pachpadra Refinery is owned by a joint venture between Hindustan Petroleum Corporation Limited (holding a 74% stake) and the Government of Rajasthan (owning a 26% stake). In January 2019, the project was announced to be worth ₹43,129 crore (US$4.5 billion). Around 66% of the financing (worth ₹28,753 crore (US$3.0 billion)) would be arranged through a loan from a joint consortium of lenders, with the State Bank of India being prime lender, contributing over 50%. However, in 2023, the estimated investment nearly doubled, increasing to ₹72,000 crore (US$7.5 billion).

Hindustan Petroleum Corporation Limited MD M. K. Surana said the project would employ 40,000 people directly and 60,000 people indirectly. More employment will be provided to locals.

Rajasthan State Industrial Development and Investment Corporation will invest ₹1 lakh crore in the Pachpadra Refinery.

== See also ==
- Barmer
- Amritsar Jamnagar Expressway
