= Yarada Hills =

Range of hills near Visakhapatnam, Andhra Pradesh, India

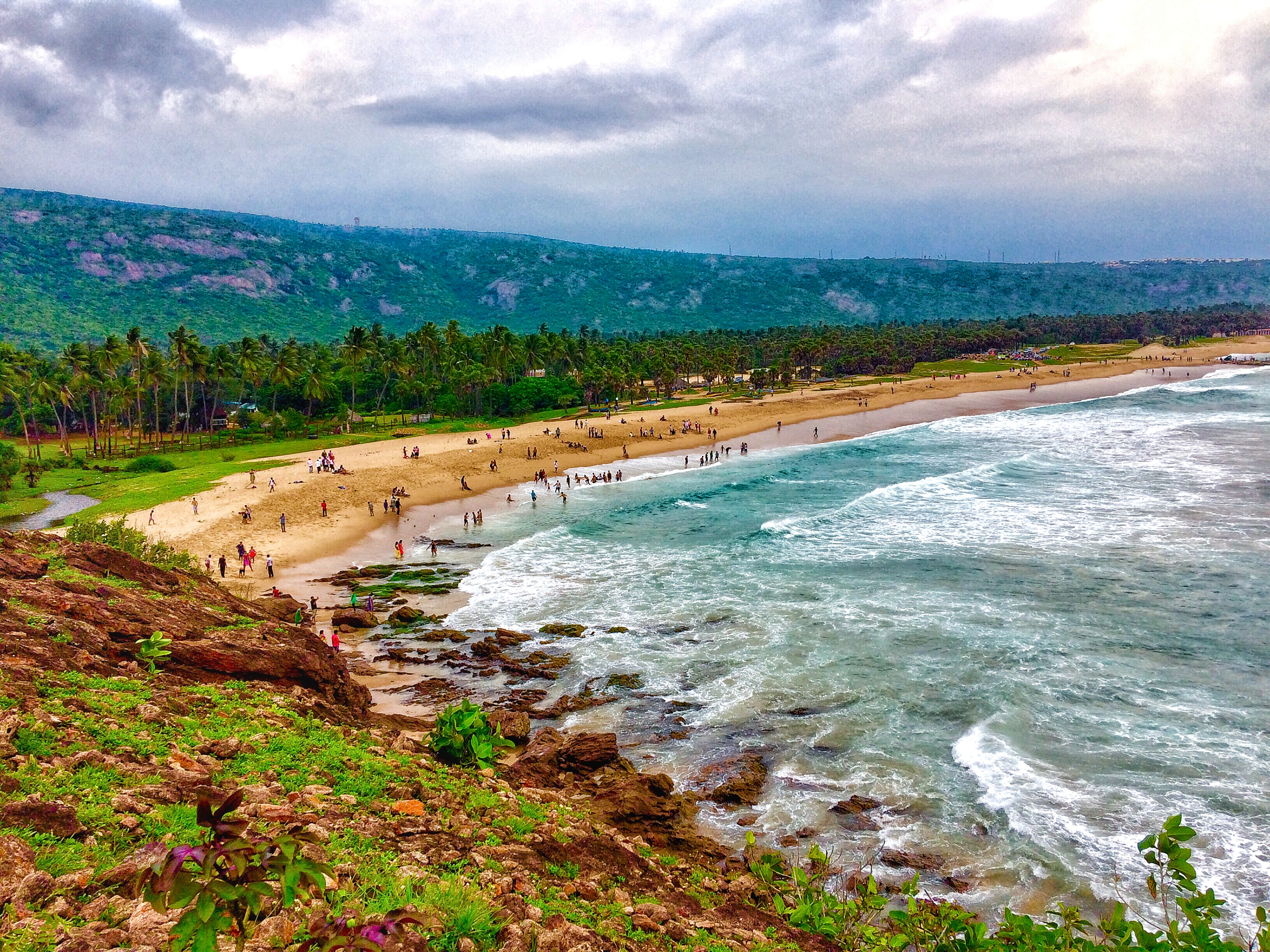
- Yarada Hills near Bay of Bengal

Highest point
- Elevation: 350 m (1,150 ft)
- Coordinates: 17°39′57″N 83°15′21″E

Geography
- Location within Visakhapatnam
- Location: Visakhapatnam, Andhra Pradesh, India

The Yarada Hills are a range of hills at Yarada to the south of Visakhapatnam City beside the Bay of Bengal in Andhra Pradesh state, India.

== Geography ==
The Yarada Hills, lying between Yarada Beach and Dolphin's Nose, are 3.5 km long with a height of 350 metres .

== Tourism ==
Tourists frequently visit the hills because there is a lighthouse, beach and spectacular city view from here. The Visakhapatnam Metropolitan Region Development Authority is developing a tourism hub.
