= LPG Equipment Research Centre =

- Abbreviation: LERC
- Formation: April 1990
- Type: Research and testing organisation
- Headquarters: Bengaluru, Karnataka, India
- Region served: India
- Website: www.lerc.co.in

The LPG Equipment Research Centre (LERC) is a research and testing organisation based in Bengaluru, Karnataka, India. Established in 1990 by Indian Oil Corporation, Bharat Petroleum and Hindustan Petroleum, it develops and evaluates equipment and quality-control measures for the liquefied petroleum gas (LPG) industry.

== History ==
LERC commenced operations in April 1990 and was registered as a society under the Karnataka Societies Registration Act, 1960, in January 1993. It was established to develop quality equipment and quality-control measures for LPG applications.

== Research and testing ==
LERC has mechanical, polymer and combustion laboratories for evaluating LPG-related equipment and components. Its research has included tamper-evident cylinder seals, portable leak testers and components used in LPG valves and pressure regulators.

New LPG cylinders received by oil marketing companies undergo incoming material inspection, which includes sending samples to LERC, according to a written answer in the Lok Sabha.

One of LERC's developments is the Suraksha Hose, designed for connecting domestic LPG cylinders to cooking appliances. The Times of India reported in 2002 that the hose was developed by LERC and had received approval from the three public-sector oil companies. In 2006, The Telegraph reported on a three-layered version of the hose developed by the centre, incorporating a rubber tube, wire reinforcement and an outer fire-resistant covering.
