= Visakhapatnam Refinery =

Oil refinery in India

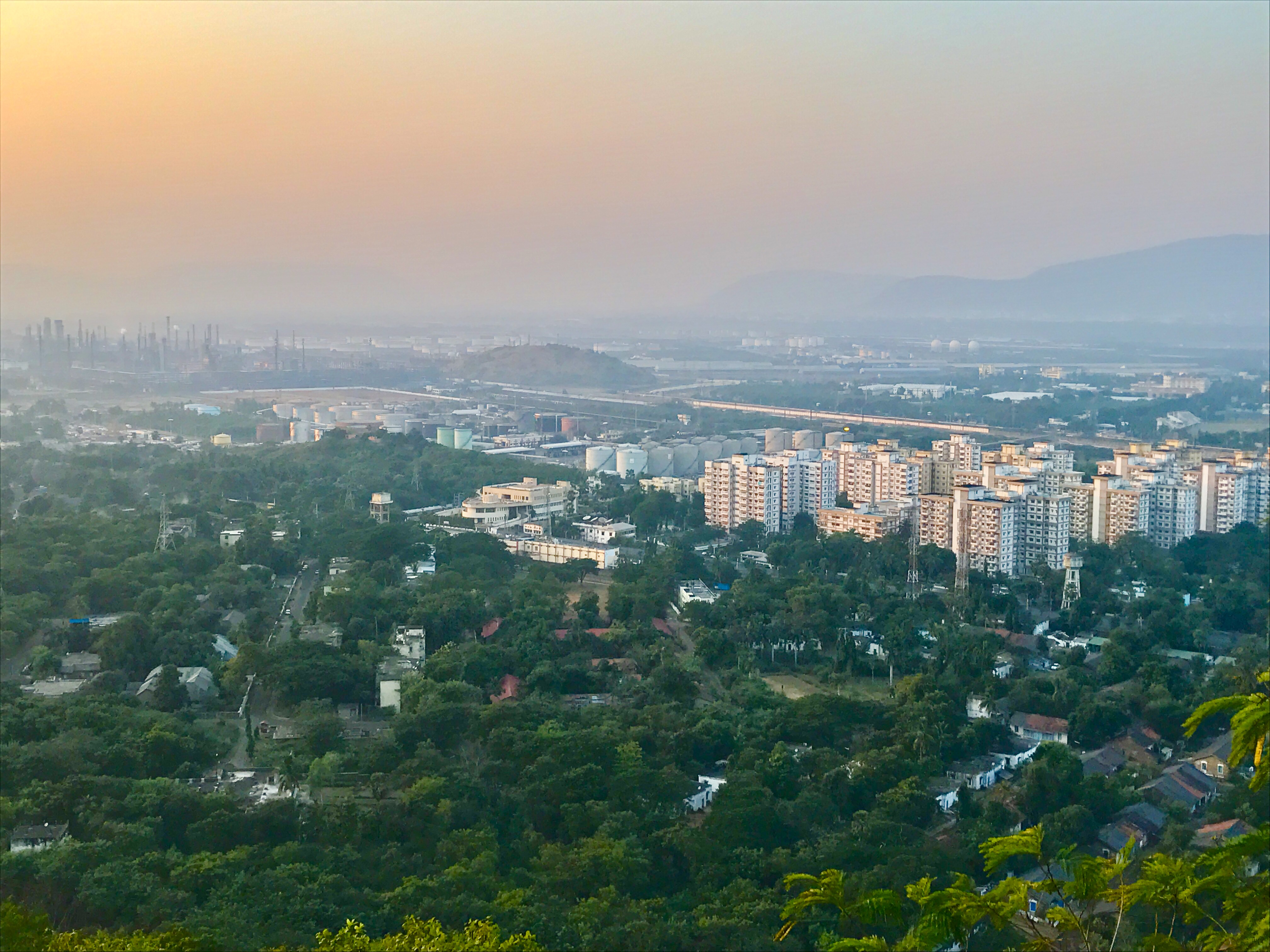
A view of HPCL (top-left) from Yarada Hill, Visakhapatnam

Visakhapatnam Refinery (officially: Visakh Refinery) is one of the two oil refineries of HPCL in India, the other being Mumbai Refinery. This was one of the first major industries of Visakhapatnam and first oil refinery on the East Coast. After the nationalisation, HPCL has transformed itself into a mega Public Sector Undertaking and it is second largest integrated oil company in India.

== History of Visakha refinery ==
Visakha refinery was commissioned by Caltex Oil Refining (India) in 1957, with an installed capacity of 0.675 million tonne per year.

The facility was acquired by the Government of India in 1976 and amalgamated with HPCL in 1978 by the CORIL-HPCL Amalgamation Order, 1978.

The refinery's capacity was increased to 4.5 million tonne per year under the first major expansion project in 1985, known as Visakha Refinery Expansion Project-I (VREP-I).

Its refining capacity was increased to 7.5 million tonne per year under VREP-II in 1999, and again to 8.3 million tonne per year in 2010.

== Visakh Refinery Modernisation Project (VRMP) ==
Visakh Refinery Modernisation Project (VRMP) is a brownfield expansion of the Visakh refinery located in Visakhapatnam, India. The project is being executed by the state-owned Hindustan Petroleum Corporation Limited (HPCL).

VRMP will expand the refining capacity of the Visakh refinery from 8.3 million tonne per year to 15 million tonne per year, while enabling the production and distribution of Bharat Stage-VI (BS-VI)-compliant fuels.

BS VI is a new emission standard that will align India's motor vehicle regulations with European Union (EU) regulations for light-duty passenger cars and commercial vehicles, heavy-duty trucks and buses, and two-wheeled vehicles. The standard is due to be implemented in India from 2020.

The VRMP project is estimated to involve an investment of approximately $3.1bn and is scheduled for completion in 2020.

=== Details of Visakh Refinery Modernisation Project ===
HPCL received approval from the Ministry of Environment, Forest, and Climate Change (MoEFCC) for the VRMP in February 2016.

The expansion project is being carried out on an area adjacent to the east portion of the existing site.

The scope of the project consists of the installation of primary processing units such as a 9 million tonne per year crude distillation unit (CDU) replacing one of the three existing CDUs, a 3.3 million tonne per year vacuum gas oil hydrocracker and a 290,000 tonne per year naphtha isomerisation unit (NIU).

An additional 3.1 million tonne per year solvent de-asphalting (SDA) unit, a 2.5 million tonne per year slurry hydrocracker unit (SHCU) and a 96t/day propylene recovery unit (PRU) are also outlined in the plans.

Other auxiliary units being built under the project include two 113 million tonne per year hydrogen generation units (HGUs), two 360t/day sulphur recovery units (SRUs) including tail gas treatment units (TGTUs), and a 36,000 tonne per year fuel gas pressure-swing adsorption (PSA) unit.

A 300t/h non-hydro-processing sour-water stripper (SWS-I), a 185t/h hydro-processing sour-water stripper (SWS-II), two 540t/h amine regeneration units (ARUs), a 112,000 tonne per year sulphur recovery LPG treating unit will also be installed.

Various existing units, including a naphtha hydro-treating unit, a continuous catalytic reformer and a diesel hydro-treating unit are also being revamped as part of the modernisation. Additionally, a duel fuel-powered captive power plant (CPP) built in 2003.

The project will also involve the construction of a new utility system comprising a re-circulating sea cooling water system consisting of cooling tower cells and water pumps, as well as a demineralised water system featuring a new reverse osmosis (RO) system and water tanks.

== Technology upgrades at Visakh refinery ==
VRMP will implement Honeywell UOP Penex™ process technology to produce a high-octane gasoline component called isomerate, and a Unicracking™ hydrocracking unit to produce cleaner burning diesel fuel.

The Penex employs high-activity isomerisation and benzene impregnation catalysts from Honeywell UOP.

Unicracking processes use highly effective catalysts to yield higher quantities of cleaner-burning fuels from a range of feedstock. The innovative configuration of the fractionation unit ensures effective separation of the products, while minimising capital costs and operating expenses.

The two processes will significantly increase the capability of the refinery to deliver petrol and diesel in compliance with the new BS-VI clean fuels standards.

"VRMP will expand the refining capacity of the Visakh refinery from 8.3 million tonne per year to 15 million tonne per year, while enabling the production of Bharat Stage-VI (BS-VI)-compliant fuels." The planned integration of innovative technologies will also enhance gross margins of the refinery by generating high-value transportation fuels from low-value raw materials.

== VRCFP (Visakh Refinery Clean Fuels Project) ==
This project was implemented by the Projects Department at Visakh Refinery. This project is essentially to produce fuels for environment improvement at an estimated cost of Rs 16352 million with an FE component of Rs 2525 million.

The project was approved by the Board on 30 April 2003. M/s EIL is the consultant for the project. Process licensors include M/s UOP, M/s Axens and M/s Belco.

== Accident ==
On 2 November 2026, at around 10 pm, fire broke out in the Pitch Tower of the Residue Upgradation Facility (RUF) of the refinery. The explosion and ensuing flames produced thick black smoke, causing brief panic among residents in the neighboring localities. No casualties were reported by officials.
