= Visakhapatnam Port =

Port in Andhra Pradesh, India

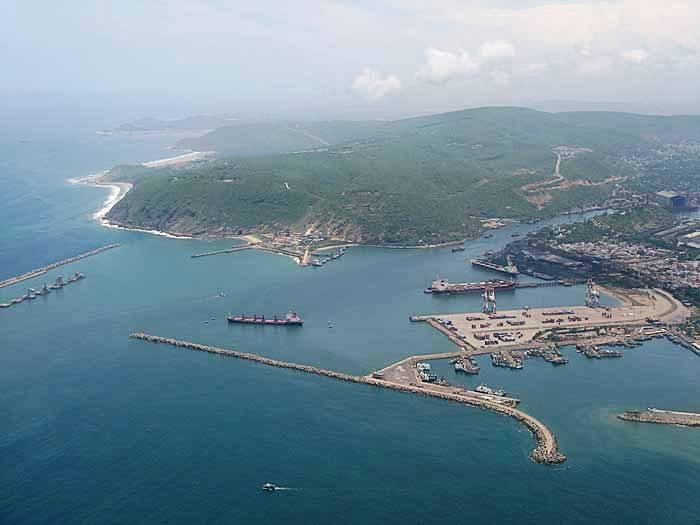
- Visakhapatnam port
- Interactive map of Visakhapatnam Port

Location
- Country: India
- Location: Visakhapatnam, Andhra Pradesh
- Coordinates: 17°41′54″N 83°16′43″E

Details
- Opened: 19 December 1933
- Operated by: Visakhapatnam Port Authority
- Owned by: Ministry of Ports, Shipping and Waterways, Government of India
- No. of berths: 31 + SPM
- Chairperson: Dr. Madhaiyaan Angamuthu, IAS

Statistics
- Annual cargo tonnage: 81.09 Million Tonnes (FY 2023–24)
- Annual container volume: 8.40 Million Tonnes
- Website; Official website

Visakhapatnam Port is one of twelve major ports in India and the only major port in Andhra Pradesh, located in Visakhapatnam.

The port is India's third largest by volume of cargo handled and largest on the Eastern Coast.

== History ==
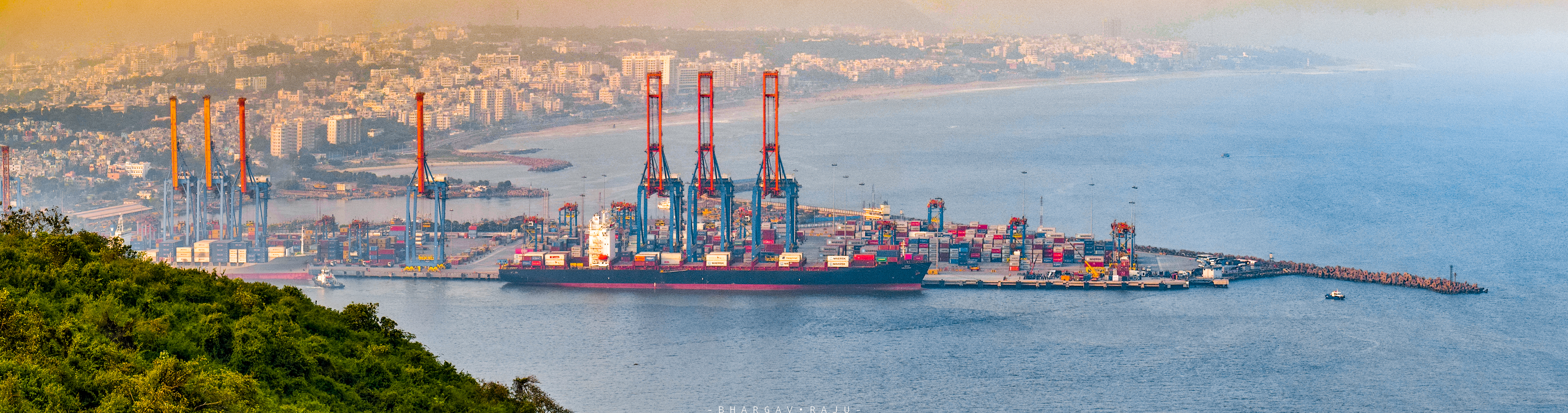
Visakhapatnam port inner harbour view

Although the need for building a port on the east coast to access Central Provinces was felt by the British in the 19th century, the proposal of Col. H.Cartwright Reid of British Admiralty for constructing a harbour at Visakhapatnam was approved by the Government only after the First World War. The Inner Harbour was built by the Bengal Nagpur Railway between 1927 and 1933 to facilitate the export of manganese ore from the Central Provinces. The port was built at a cost of ₹378 lakhs. The Port opened to ocean traffic with the arrival of a passenger vessel, S.S. Jaladurga of the Scindia Steam Navigation Co., on 7 October 1933 and was inaugurated by Lord Willingdon on 19 December 1933.

During the Second World War, the military significance of the port increased. After India's independence, the port witnessed growth under the various Five Year Plans. Over time, the port has grown from one with 3 berths handling 1.3 lakh tonnes per annum to one with 24 berths and annual traffic of 65 million tonnes. The port was notified as a major port in 1964 under the Major Port Trusts Act, 1963. Later Major Ports Authority Act, 2021 with this act, the Visakhapatnam Port Authority is in charge of running the port.

== Layout of the port ==
The port has two harbours: the Inner Harbour consisting of 22 berths and the Outer Harbour consisting of 8 berths and SPM. The inner harbour encompasses a water area of about 100 hectares and has three arms—northern, western, and north western—and is shared by the Port, Shipyard, and Eastern Naval Command. The northern arm is the main commercial arm of the inner harbour and has 19 berths. The western arm has three berths. The north western arm is entirely occupied by the Indian Navy.

The outer harbour has a protected tranquil basin of 200 hectares surrounded by a set of breakwaters (length of 3.025 km) on the eastern, southern and northern sides of the basin. The outer harbour has eight berths, a single point mooring (SPM), and a fishing harbour.

M/s.Hindustan Shipyard Ltd. and the Headquarters of Eastern Naval Command also exist adjacent to Visakhapatnam Port.

The Dolphin's Nose Hill to the north of the entrance channel protects the harbour from cyclones that strike the east coast. The port is located on the area of a creek through which the coastal river Narava Gedda joins the sea.

== Hinterland and cargo ==
The hinterland of the Visakhapatnam Port extends to north eastern Andhra Pradesh, Chhattisgarh, southern Orissa. Iron ore, manganese ore, steel products, general cargo, coal and crude oil are the main commodities handled at this port.

== Connectivity ==
The port is accessible by railways and by road.

In 1971, the port owned 16 locomotives. It's rail network is one of the largest among Indian ports, and operates over 200km of railway.

The port is connected to National Highway 16 (NH-16), Chennai-Kolkata by a 12km long 4-lane road. The road is currently undergoing expansion to become a 6-lane road.

== See also ==
- List of deepest natural harbours
