= Yarada Beach =

Beach in Andhra Pradesh, India

- Beach
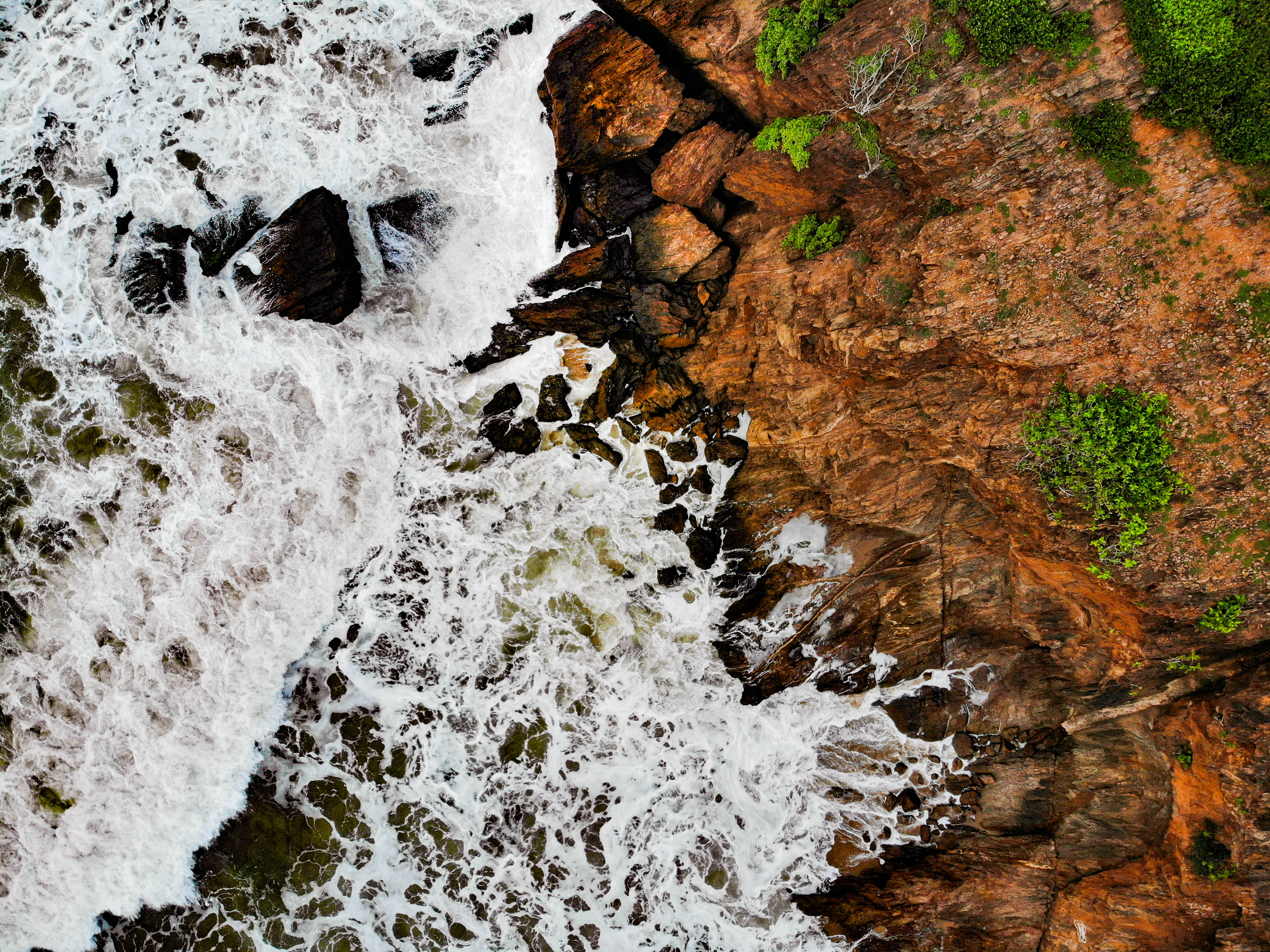
- Yarada Beach view

- Coordinates: 17.6644°N 83.2844°E
- Location: Yarada, Visakhapatnam district, Andhra Pradesh, India

Yarada Beach is situated on the east coast of Bay of Bengal in Yarada, a village at a distance of 15 kilometres (9.3 mi) from Visakhapatnam. It is located near Gangavaram beach, Dolphin's Nose, and Gangavaram Port. This is a very picturesque beach in Andhra Pradesh.

== Scientific study ==
A scientific study of the characteristics of the sediments deposited at the beach was conducted from May 2009 to May 2010. The study found that the location of Pigeon Hill has a major impact on how deposits are added to the beach and removed through erosion.

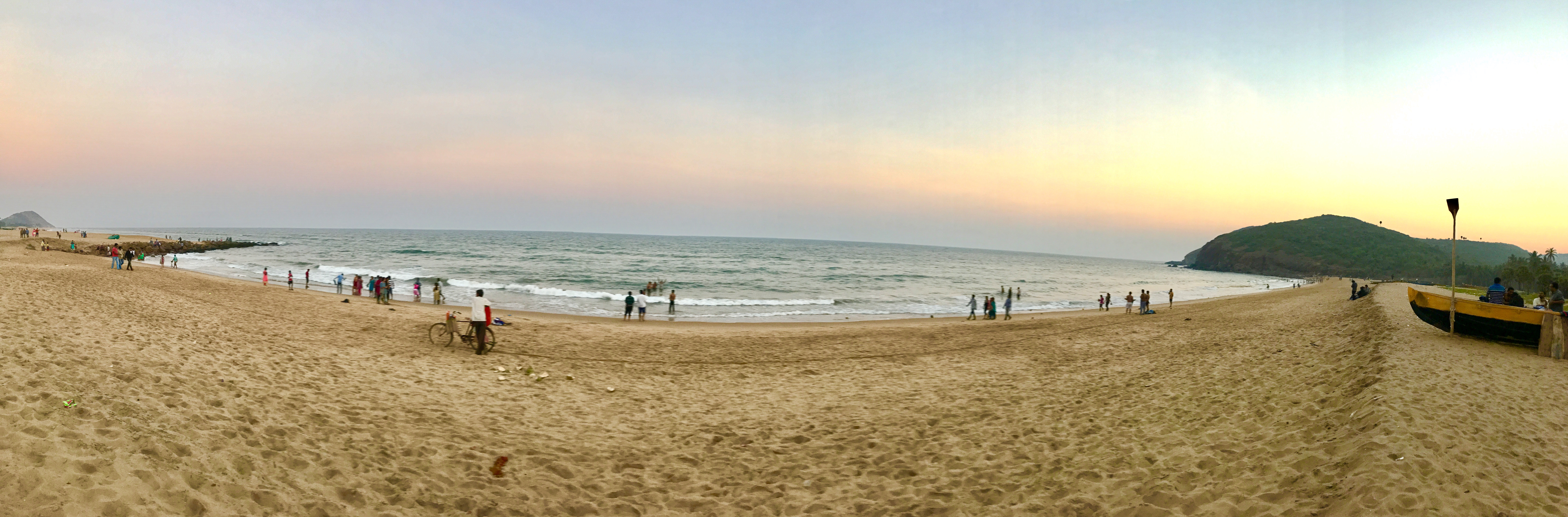
Yarada Beach Panoramic View

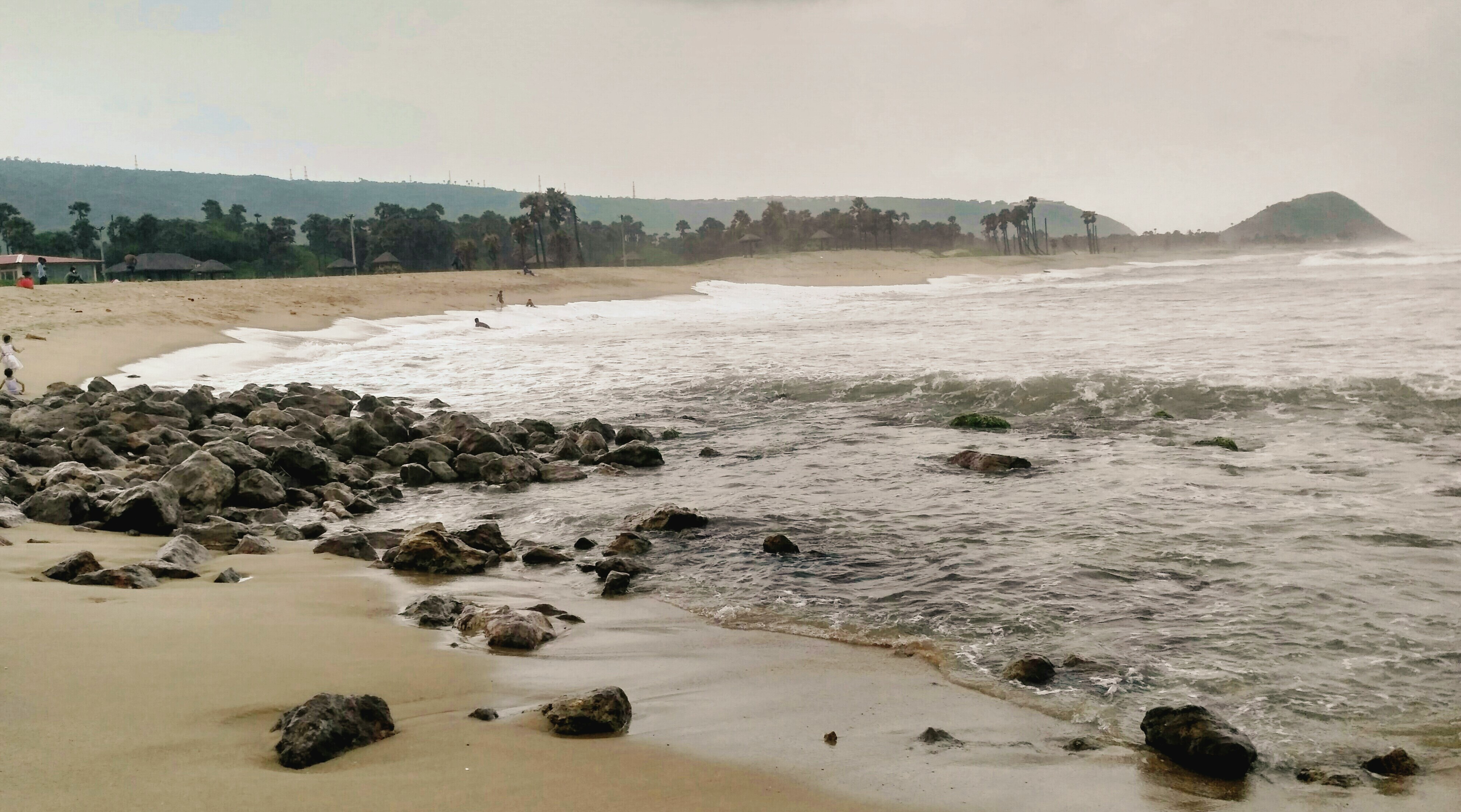
Yarada Beach in 2018.

== Transportation ==
APSRTC runs buses to this area with these routes:

Route number	Start	End	Via
16	Poorna market	Yarada Beach	Convent junction, ESSAR, Dockyard, Scindia, Wireless station, Yarada village

== See also ==
- List of beaches in India
