= Raman, Bathinda =

Raman Rama Mandi
- city
- Location in Punjab, India Raman (India)
- Coordinates: 29.950398°N 74.961948°E
- Country: India
- State: Punjab
- District: Bathinda

Government
  - Type: Constitutional Republic

Population (2011)
  - Total: 22,553

Languages
  - Official: Punjabi
- Time zone: UTC+5:30 (IST)
- PIN: 151301
- Telephone code: +911655
- Vehicle registration: PB45

Raman is a Suburb town of Bathinda City and a municipal council in Bathinda district in the Indian state of Punjab. It has one of the biggest refineries of India. Huge transformation is going to happen here in near future due to industrial growth in this area. Soon it will become the backbone of its district Bathinda. Tapacharya Shri Hem Kunwar Jain is main college for girl's education in the town which provide graduate and post graduate courses in the field of Arts, Information Technology and Commerce. Raman is connected to district Bathinda and national capital New Delhi with Railways. Bathinda Airport is nearest airport at distance of 57 km from Raman from which flights are available to Punjab and New Delhi.

== Demographics ==
As of 2011 India census, Raman Municipal Council had population of 22,553 of which 12,009 are males while 10,544 are females as per report released by Census India 2011.Female Sex Ratio is 878. Literacy rate of Raman city is 73.44% lower than state average of 75.84%. In Raman, Male literacy is around 78.54% while female literacy rate is 67.62%. Raman city has total 4,274 houses.

== History ==
In the year 2008 construction of a petroleum refinery named Guru Gobind Singh Refinery by HPCL Mittal Energy Limited commenced which was completed in March 2012. It has boosted industrial growth in Raman by manifold.
