= HPCL-Mittal Energy Limited =

Indian petrochemical company

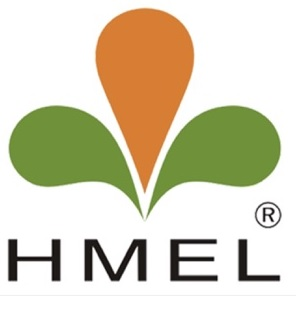
- Company type: Private
- Industry: Petroleum
- Founded: 2007
- Headquarters: Bathinda, Punjab., India
- Area served: India
- Products: Petroleum; High Speed Diesel; Aviation Turbine Fuel; LPG; Petrochemicals
- Subsidiaries: HPCL-Mittal Pipelines Limited; Guru Gobind Singh Refinery
- Website: www.hmel.in

HPCL-Mittal Energy Limited (HMEL) is an Indian integrated refining and petrochemical company, with operations spanning crude oil refining and petrochemical manufacturing. It is a public-private partnership between fortune 500 company, Hindustan Petroleum Corporation Limited (HPCL) and Mittal Energy Investments Pte Limited (MEIL), a part of the Lakshmi N. Mittal Group. It is headquartered at Noida, Uttar Pradesh and operates the 11.3 MMTPA Guru Gobind Singh Refinery (GGSR) at Bathinda, Punjab.

== History ==
HPCL-Mittal Energy Limited (HMEL) was formed in 2007 as a joint venture between Hindustan Petroleum Corporation Limited (HPCL) and Mittal Energy Investments Pte Limited (MEIL) Singapore, after approval of the Ministry of Petroleum and Natural Gas.

HMEL's Guru Gobind Singh Refinery became operational in February, 2012 and on April 28, 2012, it was dedicated to the Nation by the Former Prime Minister of India, Dr. Manmohan Singh. The Refinery produces Bharat Stage-VI compliant transportation fuels viz, Motor Spirit, High Speed Diesel, Aviation Turbine Fuel, LPG, etc.

HMEL's wholly owned subsidiary, HPCL-Mittal Pipelines Limited (HMPL), owns and operates a Single Point Mooring (SPM) for receipt of Crude Oil, Crude Oil Terminal (COT) for storage of Crude Oil and 1017 km cross country pipeline for transportation of the crude from Mundra, Gujarat to the refinery at Bathinda.

HMEL has expanded its operations into petrochemicals to produce Polypropylene (PP) and Polyethylene (PE) with an investment of US$3 Billion at Bathinda. The Petrochemical facility includes a Dual Feed Cracker Unit of 1.2 Million MT/annum along with 1.2 MMTPA Polyethylene (PE) and 1.0 MMTPA Polypropylene (PP) Plants.

HMEL has also set up 300 Kilo Liters Per Day (KLPD) Bio-ethanol Plant near Guru Gobind Singh Refinery, Bathinda and diversifying into specialty chemicals. In 2021, HMEL became the first Indian company to buy Guyanese crude Liza. In May 2022, HMEL partnered with Gail India for the supply 1 million standard cubic meters per day of gas to its Bathinda refinery in Punjab. In 2023, HMEL signed an MoU with NTPC Green Energy Ltd. to collaborate for renewable energy and generation of green hydrogen and green chemicals. HMEL launched a new generation of AI-enabled energy stations in Noida. In February 2025, HMEL partnered with Emerson and Aveva for automation in refinery and petrochemicals.
