= Directorate General of Hydrocarbons =

Governmental regulatory body in India

Directorate General of Hydrocarbon
Agency overview
- Headquarters: New Delhi, India
- Minister responsible: Hardeep Singh Puri (Indian politician), Ministry of Petroleum and Natural Gas
- Agency executive: Shri V.Ponnuraj, Director General
- Website: www.dghindia.gov.in

The Directorate General of Hydrocarbon (DGH) is the Indian governmental regulatory body under the Ministry of Petroleum and Natural Gas.

The Directorate General of Hydrocarbons (DGH) was established in 1993 under the administrative control of Ministry of Petroleum and Natural Gas through Government of India Resolution. Objectives of DGH are to promote sound management of the oil and natural gas resources having a balanced regard for environment, safety, technological and economic aspects of the petroleum activity.

== Vision ==
Its vision is to be an advisory & technical regulatory body of international repute, creating value for society through proliferation and dissemination of E&P knowledge, optimal hydrocarbon resource management & environment friendly practices.

== Objective ==
To promote exploration and sound management of the petroleum and natural gas resources as also non-conventional hydrocarbon energy resources having balanced regard for the environment, safety, technological and economic aspects.

== Functions and responsibility ==
- Review exploration programmes of companies for adequacy
1. Half yearly review of work programmes in Petroleum Exploration Licence (PEL) areas of ONGC and OIL, awarded on Nomination Basis.
2. Processing and review of all the PEL and ML cases for the Ministry.
3. Review of work programme and budget of all exploration blocks and fields under PSCs.
4. Monitoring of all CBM blocks awarded under CBM rounds I, II and III.
5. Change of participating interest and assignment cases.
6. Participation in Management Committee meetings.
7. Cost monitoring, statutory payments to government, Profit sharing to government.
8. Facilitating statutory and other clearances.
9. Extension of phases, relinquishment of acreages, assignment, appointment of auditor, approval of audited accounts and other PSC related issues.
10. Participation in arbitration matters.
11. Advise Government on policy formulations.
12. Issuance of essentiality certificates.
- Technical and financial evaluation and review of development plans of commercial discoveries
- Concurrent review of reservoir performance of all the major fields under private / JV operators and major fields of NOCs including Bombay High.
- Advise Government on offering and award of acreages under NELP & CBM rounds for exploration as well as, matters relating to relinquishment of acreages.
1. Conduct Studies, Surveys, Information Drilling and Related Activities in Unexplored or Poorly Explored Areas.
2. Upgrade information in these areas viz. reprocessing and reinterpretation of data.
3. Identification of blocks, preparation of Basin Dockets and Data Packages, organizing road shows in the country and abroad for promotion of blocks & sale of data.
4. Technical evaluation of NELP and CBM round bids and recommendations to Ministry.
5. Assist MOPNG in contract negotiations and their finalization.
6. Technical advice to MOP&NG on issues relevant to exploration and optimal exploitation of oil and gas
7. Monitoring of Production Sharing Contracts (PSC) as Govt. representative to achieve exploration targets and optimal exploitation of hydrocarbons in the country.
8. Technical advice on preparation of five year plans.
9. Technical advice on Quarterly Progress Reports of ONGC and OIL.
- Preservation, upkeep and storage of data / samples pertaining to petroleum exploration, production, etc. and the preparation of data packages for acreage on offer
1. Creation and maintenance of National E&P Data Base and Archive System.
2. Storage of data acquired by DGH and oil and gas companies.
- Field Surveillance of producing fields and blocks to monitor their performance
- Compliance of Ministry of Defence (MOD) guidelines
1. DGH scientists remain onboard all the seismic vessels and deep water drilling rigs during operation.
2. DGH geophysicists accompany all raw / field seismic and G.M. data whenever it leaves the country for processing and interpretation.
- All other matters incidental there to and such other functions as may be assigned by Government
1. Coordinate the technical activities of all projects under National Gas Hydrate Programme (NGHP).
2. To provide input material for Parliament Questions, Parliamentary Committees relating to DGH and Pvt /JV operations.
3. Issuance of Essentiality Certificates for import of goods used in petroleum operations.
4. Clearances issued during April 2007 to March 2008: 13,221 cases valued at Rs. 34,957.51 crores.
5. Facilitating clearances from MOD for foreign rigs/vessels and from MOEF for all projects under Pvt /JV operations.

== Staffing ==
DGH is staffed by personnel drawn on deputation/tenure basis mainly from upstream Public Sector Undertakings like ONGC & OIL.

The major Public Sector Undertakings (PSUs) of India from which employees and staff have been deputed to DGH are:

- ONGC
- OIL
- IOC
- BPCL
- GAIL
- GSPC
- HPCL

The requirement of staff is supplemented through trainee officers. Monthly remuneration to staff is as per the rules of concerned parent organization. DGH now hiring advisers and consultants from open market as well who are specialized in the field of Geology, geophysics, finance, reservoir, legal, environment, production etc. Tenure of these consultants is up to three years and extendable for another 2 years.
