= Digboi Refinery =

Oil refinery in Assam, India

Digboi Oil Refinery
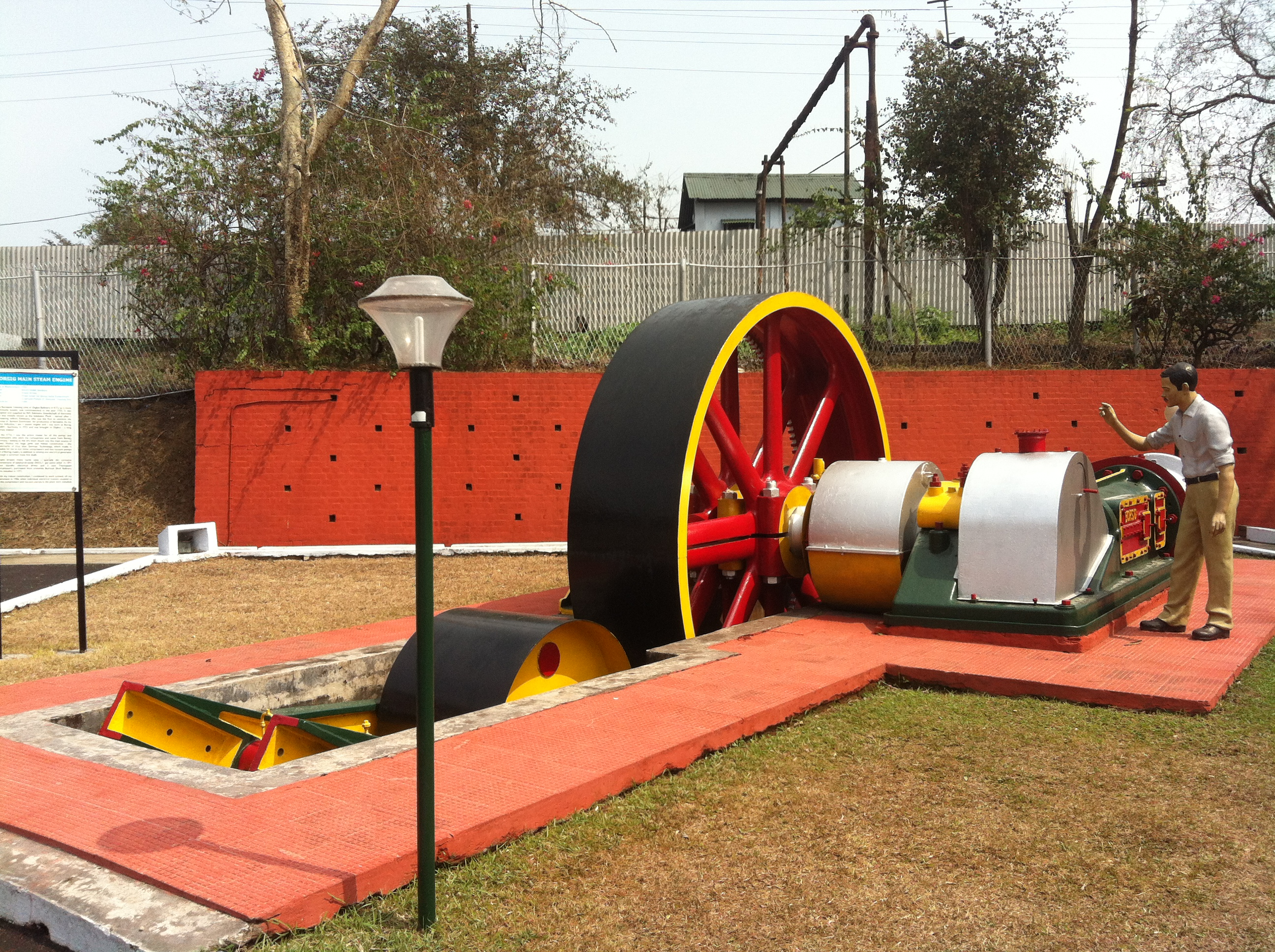
- Digboi Centenary Museum

- Location within Assam Location within India
- Interactive map of Digboi Oil Refinery
- Location: Digboi, Assam, India; 27°23′27″N 95°37′07″E

Refinery details
- Owner: Indian Oil Corporation Limited
- Opened: 1901; 125 years ago
- Capacity: 0.65 MMTPA

Digboi Oil Refinery was established in Digboi in 1901 by Assam Oil Company Ltd. The Indian Oil Corporation Ltd (IOC) took over the refinery and marketing management of Assam Oil Company Ltd. with effect from 1981 and created a separate division. This division has both refinery and marketing operations. The refinery at Digboi had an installed capacity of 0.5 million tonnes per year. The refining capacity of the refinery was increased to 0.65 million tonnes per year by the modernization of the refinery in July 1996. A new delayed Coking Unit of 170,000 tonnes per year capacity was commissioned in 1999. A new Solvent Dewaxing Unit for maximizing the production of microcrystalline wax was installed and commissioned in 2003. The refinery has also installed a Hydrotreater-UOP in 2002 to improve the quality of diesel. The MSQ Upgradation unit has been commissioned. A new terminal was expected to be completed by 2016. It is one of the best oil fields in Assam. Certified

During the Second World War, the Digboi oil field produced up to 7,000 barrels of crude oil per day, playing a crucial role in wartime fuel supply. However, oil production began to decline after the war. Over the years, more than 1,000 wells have been drilled in the Digboi oil field. Today, the field's current production stands at around 240 barrels per day.

The small town of Digboi in the remote north eastern corner of the country is the birthplace of the Oil Industry in India. Digboi Refinery, commissioned in 1901. It is India's oldest operating refinery and one of the oldest operating refineries in the world, and is termed as the "Gangotri of the Indian Hydrocarbon sector." Earlier owned and operated by the Assam Oil Company Limited/Burmah Oil Company, it came into the fold of the Indian Oil Corporation Limited and became the Assam Oil Division of Indian Oil Corporation Limited.

== History ==
Digboi refinery is known as the birthplace of the oil Industry in India. It was commissioned on 11 December 1901. It has the distinction of being Asia's first refinery and one of the oldest still in operation. Oil was accidentally discovered in 1867 while laying a railway line in the Digboi area. It was just found seeping out in dense jungles in the Tinsukia district. Digging for oil started in 1889, and the refinery was established in 1901 at Digboi.

== See also ==
- Bongaigaon Refinery
- Guwahati Refinery
