= Jamnagar refinery =

Oil refinery in Gujarat, India

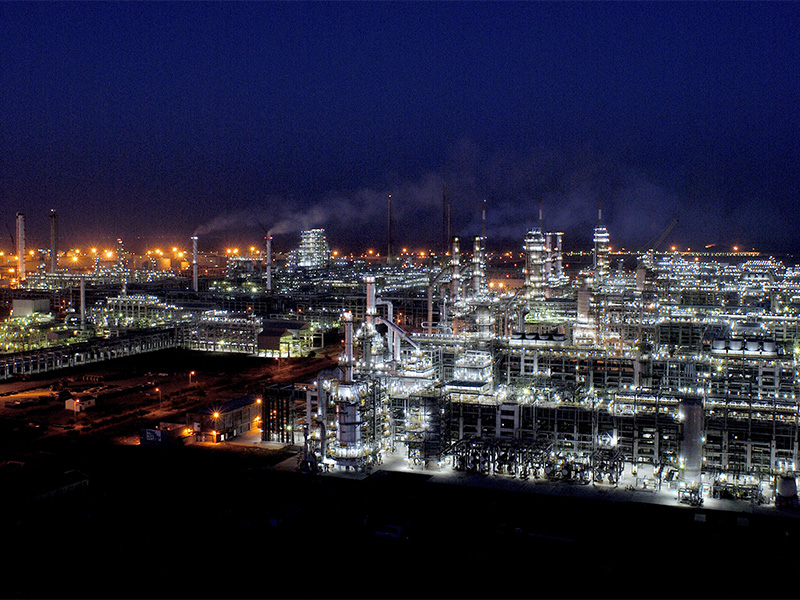
- The Jamnagar refinery at night.

- The location of the Jamnagar refinery in Gujarat.
- Location: Motikhavdi, Jamnagar, Gujarat, India; 22°20′53″N 69°52′8″E

Refinery details
- Owner: Reliance Industries Limited
- Opened: 14 July 1999
- Capacity: 18,400,000 barrels per day (2,930,000 m^{3}/d)
- Complexity index: 21.1

The Jamnagar refinery, also known as RIL Jamnagar or RPL Jamnagar, is a private sector crude oil refinery owned by Reliance Industries in Motikhavdi, Jamnagar, Gujarat, India. The refinery was commissioned in July 1999 with an initial installed capacity of 668,000 barrels per day (106,200 m^{3}/d). Its current installed capacity after expansion is 1,240,000 barrels per day (197,000 m^{3}/d). It is currently the largest oil refinery in the world.

== History ==
In December 2001, Reliance Petroleum Limited (RPL) announced the commissioning of its refinery into a special economic zone in Jamnagar district of Gujarat, India. The completion of the refinery has enabled Jamnagar to emerge as a 'Refinery land', housing the world's largest refining complex with an aggregate refining capacity of 1.24 million barrels (197,000 m^{3}) of oil per day, more than any other single location in the world.

The globally competitive RPL refinery was commissioned in 36 months. RPL contracted several companies having expertise in engineering construction and refining like Bechtel, UOP LLC and Foster Wheeler (multinational corporation) amongst others. There were plans for the pipeline to process High Pour Point crude oil extracted at Barmer, Rajasthan, although this would require an electrically heated traced pipeline to be set up from Barmer to Jamnagar.

The entire complex, as of 2013, consists of manufacturing and allied facilities, utilities, off-sites, port facilities and a township (415 acres) with housing for its 2,500 employees, on over 7,500 acres (3,000 ha; 11.7 sq mi) of land. If all of the pipes used in the refinery were laid out, one after another, they would connect the whole of India from north to south.

To complete the structure, Dhirajlal Hirachand Ambani , the father of Mukesh Ambani, had a mango plantation of 102,000 trees planted, making it larger than that of the Indian Mughal Akbar. It is said to be the largest mango plantation in Asia, as well as a refuge for migratory birds. Over 200 different varieties of mangoes are harvested on the plantation. Thanks to the plantation, India became one of the largest mango exporters in Asia.

=== Export expansion ===
In 2019, during the COVID-19 pandemic, the domestic demand for polymer declined sharply in India. As a result, in order to keep production and sales running, Reliance Industries Limited management decided to refocus the production of polymer on export markets. With the help of the Maersk shipping and logistics group, exports from the Jamnagar refinery were quadrupled to over 10,000 x 40' containers, which transported and exported through Port Pipavav.

In the 2020s, following sanctions imposed on Russia by mainly Western countries, but not by India, the Jamnagar refinery was one of the main refiners exporting oil products made from Russian oil to sanctioning nations. The refinery has been the destination of Russian shadow fleet vessels.

== Labour and environmental issues ==
=== Labour issues ===
The Jamnagar refinery has been the site of several incidents involving labour issues, worker fatalities, and unrest.

In September 2005, tensions between local villagers and workers at the refinery escalated into violent clashes following a dispute over access to water, with the unrest spilling over to the nearby Essar oil refinery. The unrest was rooted in growing local resentment over the arrival of approximately 10,000 migrant labourers from Indian states such as Odisha, Bihar, and Uttar Pradesh, who were working under precarious contracts. In response, village leaders forced their relocation to worker camps constructed by Reliance and Essar, before the situation culminated in violent confrontations involving an estimated 5,000 workers and villagers.

In September 2015, a construction worker employed on an expansion project at the refinery complex was found dead, hanging in a room within a labour colony near the site. While some sources reported that Reliance Industries stated the cause of death to be a heart attack, others cited cardiac arrest as the official explanation. The colony, which accommodated over 50,000 migrant workers, became the focus of unrest following the incident. Tensions escalated when a team of Reliance officials visited the colony to investigate, prompting a violent reaction from some labourers; believing the death to have resulted from a workplace accident, two worker groups torched vehicles and engaged in stone-pelting at company officials and policemen. Authorities later stated that the death was likely due to natural causes or suicide. Police forces were deployed, using tear gas and live fire, to control the situation, resulting in one death and three injuries.

ln November 2016, a flash fire in the refinery complex led to the death of two workers with six others sustaining burn injuries. Refinery operations continued as normal.

=== Greenhouse gas emissions ===
The Jamnagar refinery is the world's largest greenhouse gas emitter among refineries. In 2022, its emissions were estimated at 19.76 million tonnes.

== See also ==
- List of oil refineries in India
- Petrochemicals
- Chemical engineering
