= Dolphin's Nose =

Hill in Visakhapatnam between the port and Yarada village

Coordinates: 17.676326°N 83.292545°E

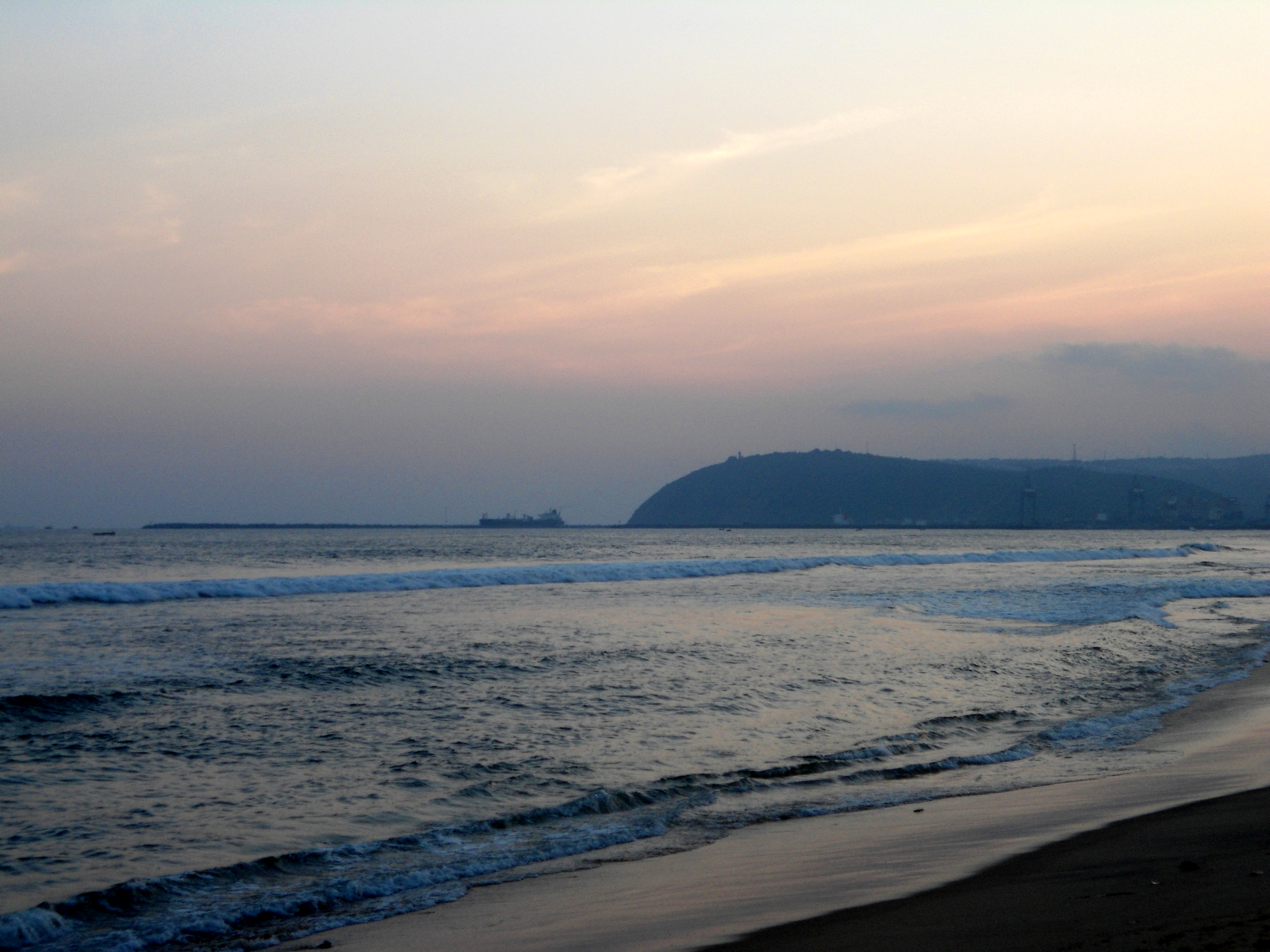
- Dolphin's Nose as seen from the RK Beach

Highest point
- Elevation: 358 m (1,175 ft)

Geography
- Location within Visakhapatnam
- Location: Visakhapatnam, Andhra Pradesh, India

Dolphin's Nose is a hill in Visakhapatnam between Yarada and Gangavaram Port. The hill is named Dolphin's Nose because it resembles a dolphin's nose. It is a conspicuous land mark in Visakhapatnam. Dolphin's Nose is a huge rocky head land which is 174 meters high and 358 meters above sea level. The powerful beacon of the light house set on this rock at sea directs ships 65 km away.

== History ==
Before independence, the British Army used it as a Military Camp. There is a Hindu Temple, a Church, and a Mosque on a nearby hill. In 1804 British and French forces fought the Battle of Vizagapatam near this hill.

== Lighthouse ==
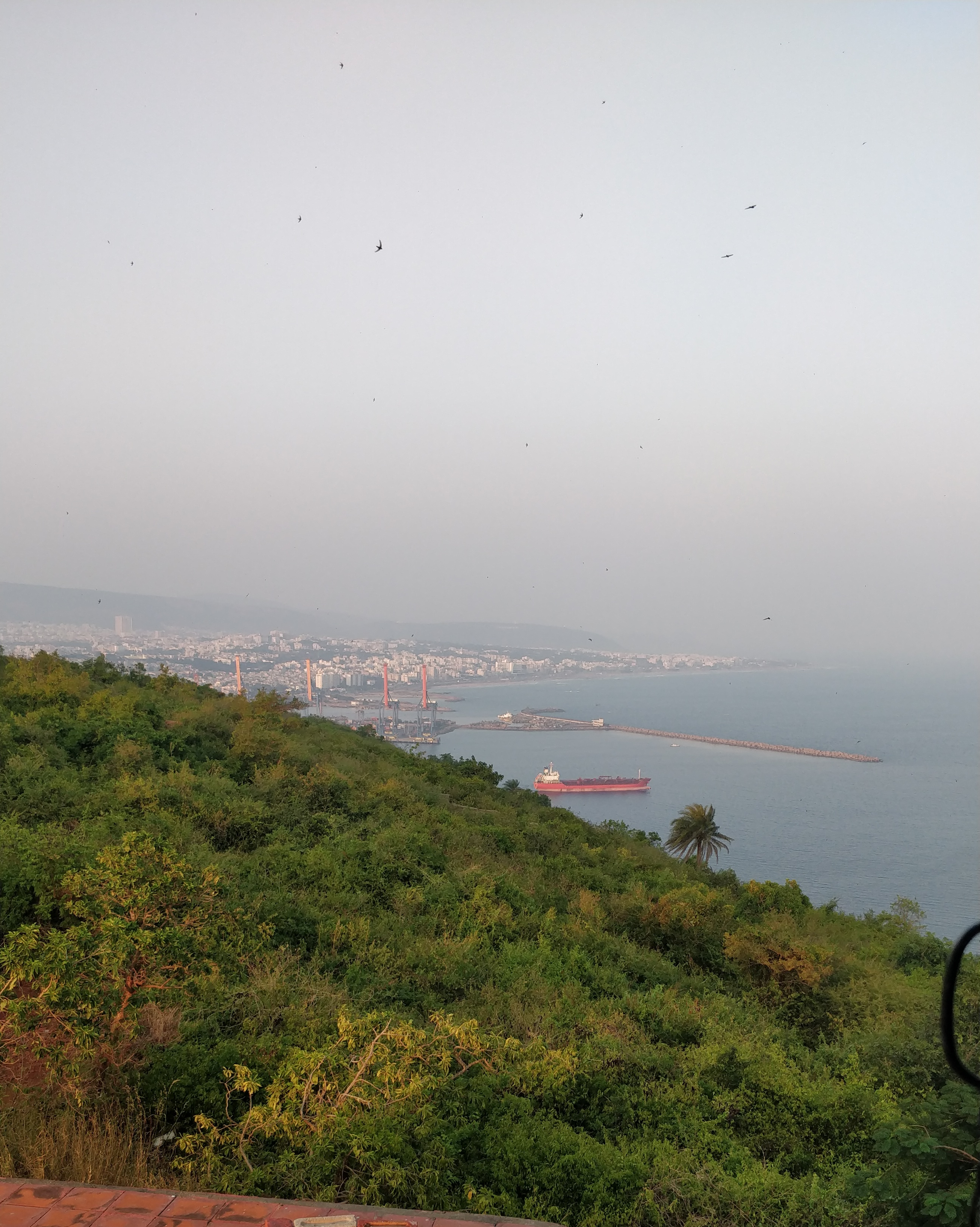
Visakhapatnam port from Lighthouse

A lighthouse on this hill guides ships to enter Visakhapatnam Port. The lighthouse currently uses 7 million candle power that covers up to a distance of 64 kilometers.

Recently the Government of India indicated that it is planning to start "lighthouse tourism" which includes this lighthouse in the tour.
