= Guru Gobind Singh Refinery =

Oil refinery in Punjab, India

Bathinda Refinery
- Location within Punjab
- Location: Bathinda, Punjab, India, India; 29°55′50″N 74°56′45″E

Refinery details
- Operator: HPCL
- Owner: HMEL
- Opened: March 2012
- Capacity: 230,000 barrels per day (37,000 m^{3}/d)

Guru Gobind Singh Refinery (GGSR) is a joint venture refinery owned by HMEL, a joint venture between HPCL and Mittal Energy Investment Pte Ltd, owned by Laxmi Mittal. It is the tenth largest refinery in India.

The work for refinery started in 2008 and the refinery became operational in March 2012. Its annual capacity is 11.3 Million tons (230,000 barrels per day). It was built at a cost of $4 billion. The refinery gets its crude oil supply from Mundra, a coastal town in Gujarat, through a 1,017 km pipeline where the oil is imported from abroad.

== About ==
Engineers India Limited as the Project Management Consultancy (PMC) has done EPC for the entire project.

== Location ==
GGSR is located in village Phullo Khari at distance of 2 Km from Raman Mandi and around 42 Km from Bathinda, Punjab, India.
