= Hindustan Petroleum =

Indian public sector oil and gas company pvt ltd

- Type: Public
- Traded as: BSE: 500104; NSE: HINDPETRO
- ISIN: INE094A01015
- Industry: Petroleum
- Founded: 5 July 1952; 74 years ago
- Headquarters: Mumbai, Maharashtra, India
- Key people: Vikas Kaushal (Chairman & Managing Director)
- Products: Petroleum; Natural gas; LNG; Lubricants; Petrochemicals
- Revenue: ▲₹481,122 crore (US$50 billion) (2026)
- Operating income: ▲₹22,145 crore (US$2.3 billion) (2026)
- Net income: ▲₹18,047 crore (US$1.9 billion) (2026)
- Total assets: ▲₹203,039 crore (US$21 billion) (2026)
- Total equity: ▲₹65,556 crore (US$6.8 billion) (2026)
- Number of employees: 8,154 (2024)
- Parent: Oil and Natural Gas Corporation
- Subsidiaries: Prize Petroleum Company Limited; HPCL Biofuels Limited; HPCL Middle East FZCO; HPCL LNG Limited
- Website: hindustanpetroleum.com

Hindustan Petroleum Corporation Limited (HPCL) is an Indian public sector undertaking in petroleum and natural gas industry, headquartered in Mumbai. It is a subsidiary of the Oil and Natural Gas Corporation (ONGC), which is owned by the Government of India and under the administration of Ministry of Petroleum and Natural Gas.

Since 2018, Oil and Natural Gas Corporation has owned majority of its stake. It is ranked 367th on the Fortune Global 500 list of the world's biggest corporations as of 2016. On 24 October 2019, it became a Maharatna (PSU).

== History ==
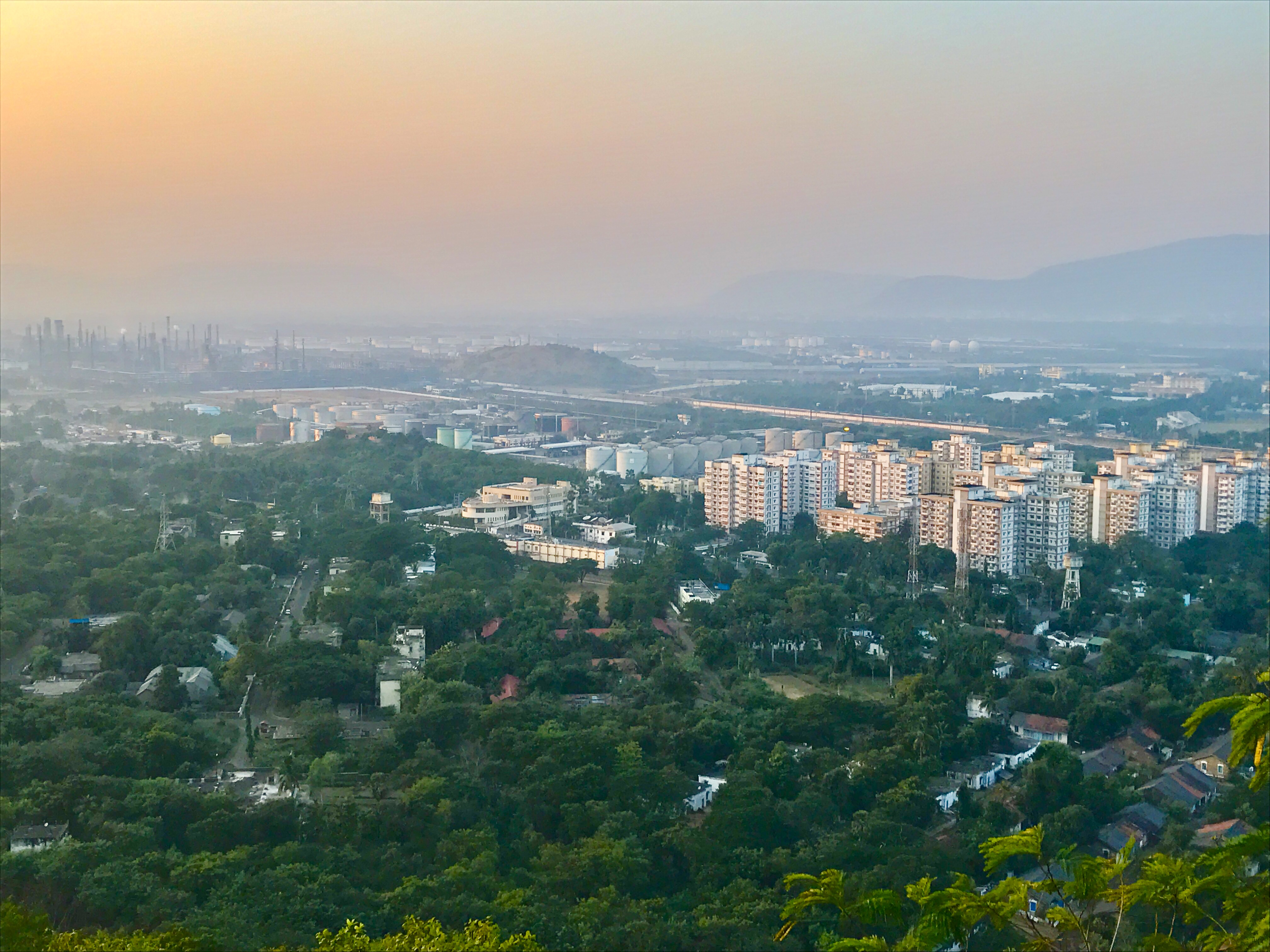
A view of an oil refinery under HPCL (top-left), from Yarada Hill, Visakhapatnam

HPCL was incorporated on 5 July 1952 as Standard Vacuum Refining Company of India Limited. In 1974, it changed its name to Caltex Oil Refining India Ltd. after the takeover and merger of erstwhile Esso Standard and Lube India Limited by the Esso (Acquisition of Undertakings in India) Act 1974. Caltex Oil Refining (India) Ltd. (CORIL) was taken over by the Government of India in 1976 and merged with HPCL in 1978 by the CORIL-HPCL Amalgamation Order 1978. Kosan Gas Company was merged with HPCL in 1979 by the Kosangas Company Acquisition Act 1979.

In 2003, following a petition by the Centre for Public Interest Litigation (CPIL), the Supreme Court of India restrained the central government from privatizing Hindustan Petroleum and Bharat Petroleum without the approval of Parliament. As counsel for the CPIL, Rajinder Sachar and Prashant Bhushan said that the only way to disinvest in the companies would be to repeal or amend the Acts by which they were nationalized in the 1970s. As a result, the government would need a majority in both houses to push through any privatization.

On 19 July 2017, the Government of India announced the acquisition of HPCL by the Oil and Natural Gas Corporation (ONGC). On 1 November 2017, the Union Cabinet approved ONGC for acquiring a majority 51.11% stake in HPCL. On 30 January 2018, ONGC acquired 51.11% stake, thus gaining majority ownership.

== Operations ==
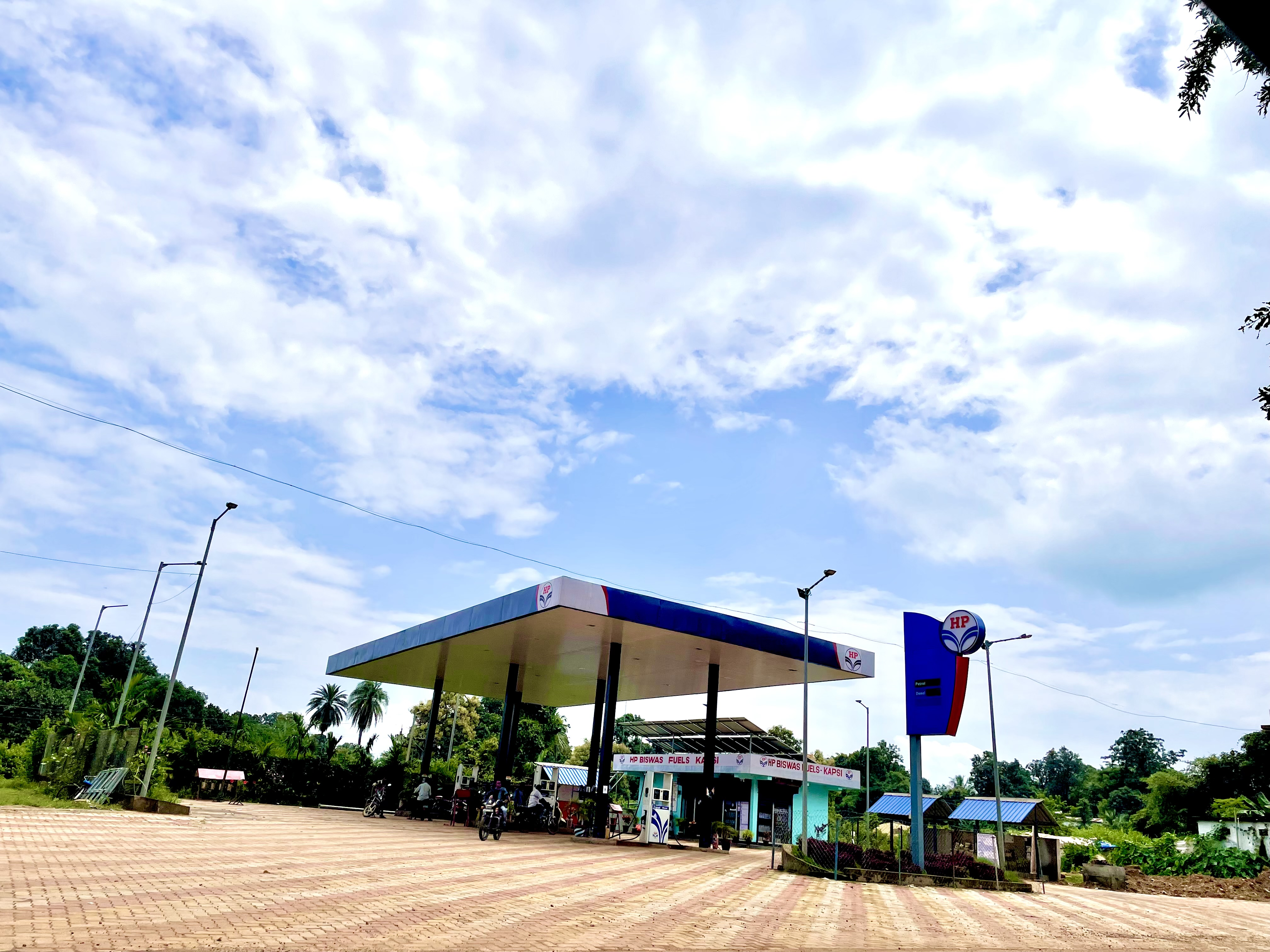
An HP fueling station in Kapsi, Chhattisgarh

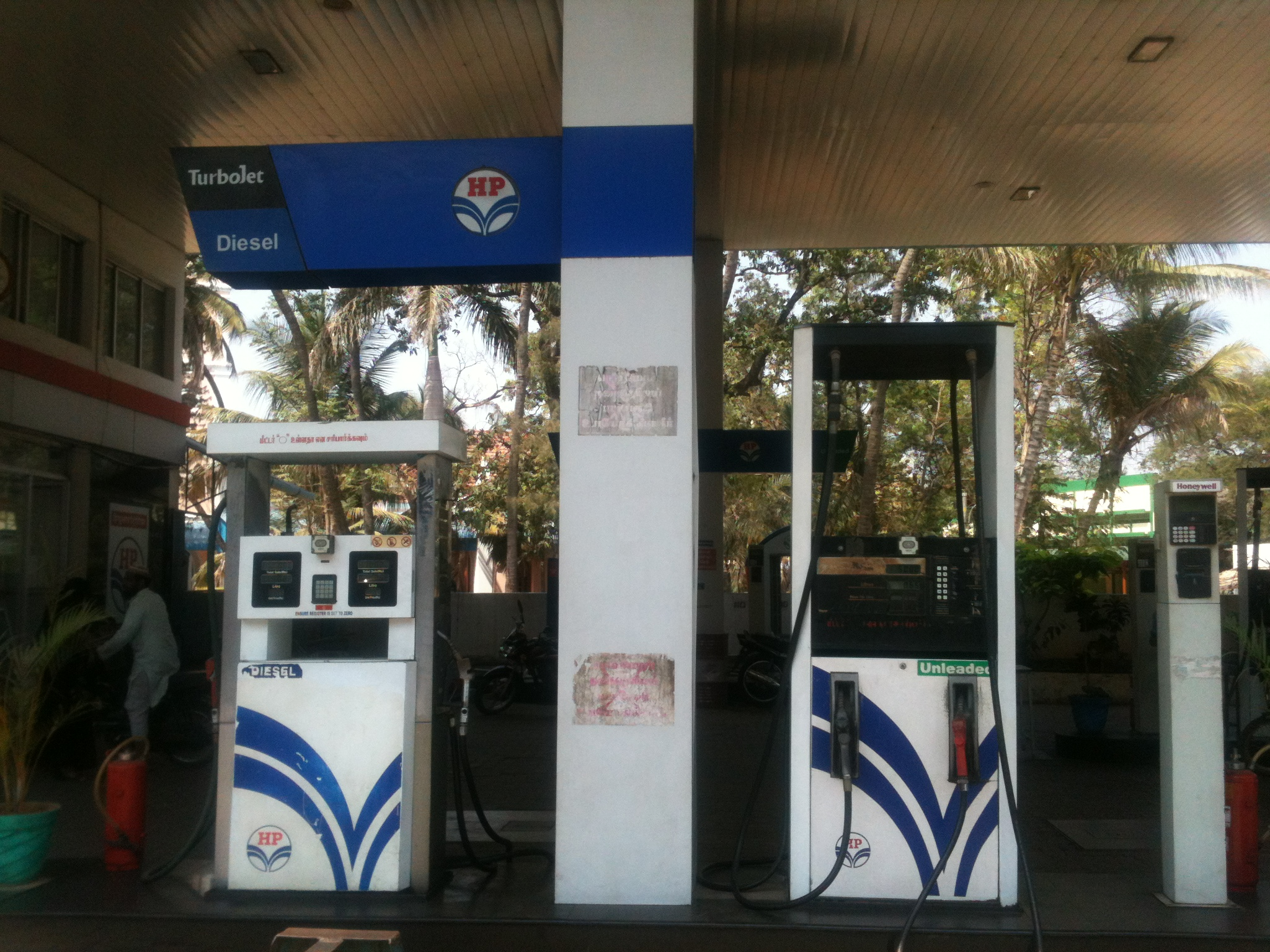
HP fuel pump in Coimbatore

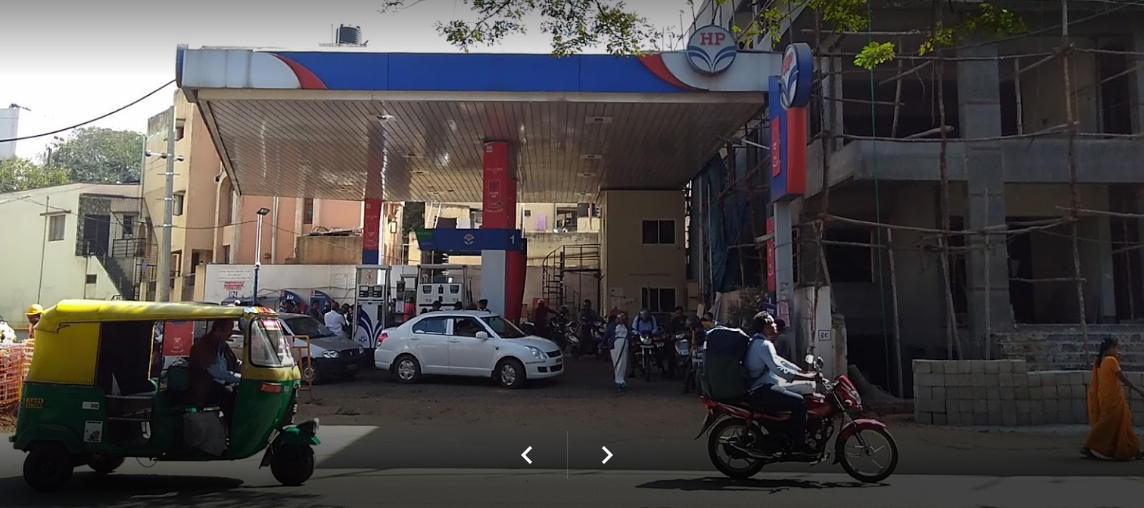
HP petrol bunk at Basaveshwaranagara, Bangalore

HPCL wholly owns two major refineries in India: one in Mumbai (west coast) with a capacity of 9.5 million tons per year, and one in Visakhapatnam (east coast) with a capacity of 13.7 million tons per year.

In addition, HPCL holds an equity stake of 16.95% in Mangalore Refinery and Petrochemicals Limited, a company that runs a refinery in Mangalore with a capacity over 9 million tons per year. HMEL, a joint venture between HPCL and Mittal Energy Investments Pte. Ltd, operates another refinery of 11.3 million tons per year in Bathinda, Punjab. HPCL has signed a memorandum of understanding with the Government of Rajasthan for constructing a refinery near Barmer; it would be operated under a joint venture company called HPCL Rajasthan Refinery Limited (Popularly known as HRRL).

HPCL also owns and operates the largest lubricant refinery in India, with a capacity of 335,000 metric tons, producing lube base oils. This refinery accounts for over 40% of India's total lube base oil production. HPCL produces over 300 grades of lubes, specialties, and greases.

The marketing network of HPCL consists of 19 zonal offices in major cities and 145 regional offices facilitated by a supply and distribution infrastructure comprising terminals, aviation service facilities, liquefied petroleum gas bottling plants and distributors, lube filling plants and distributors, inland relay depots, and retail outlets (petrol pumps).

HPCL has an information technology infrastructure to support its core business. The data center is at HITEC City in Hyderabad.

According to a 2025 Financial Times investigation, the Guru Gobind Singh Refinery received multiple shipments of Russian crude oil transported part of the way on tankers listed under US and EU sanctions, involving ship-to-ship transfers offshore in the Gulf of Oman. The article noted that there was no evidence indicating whether the refinery’s operators were aware of the sanctioned status of the vessels.

=== Facilities ===
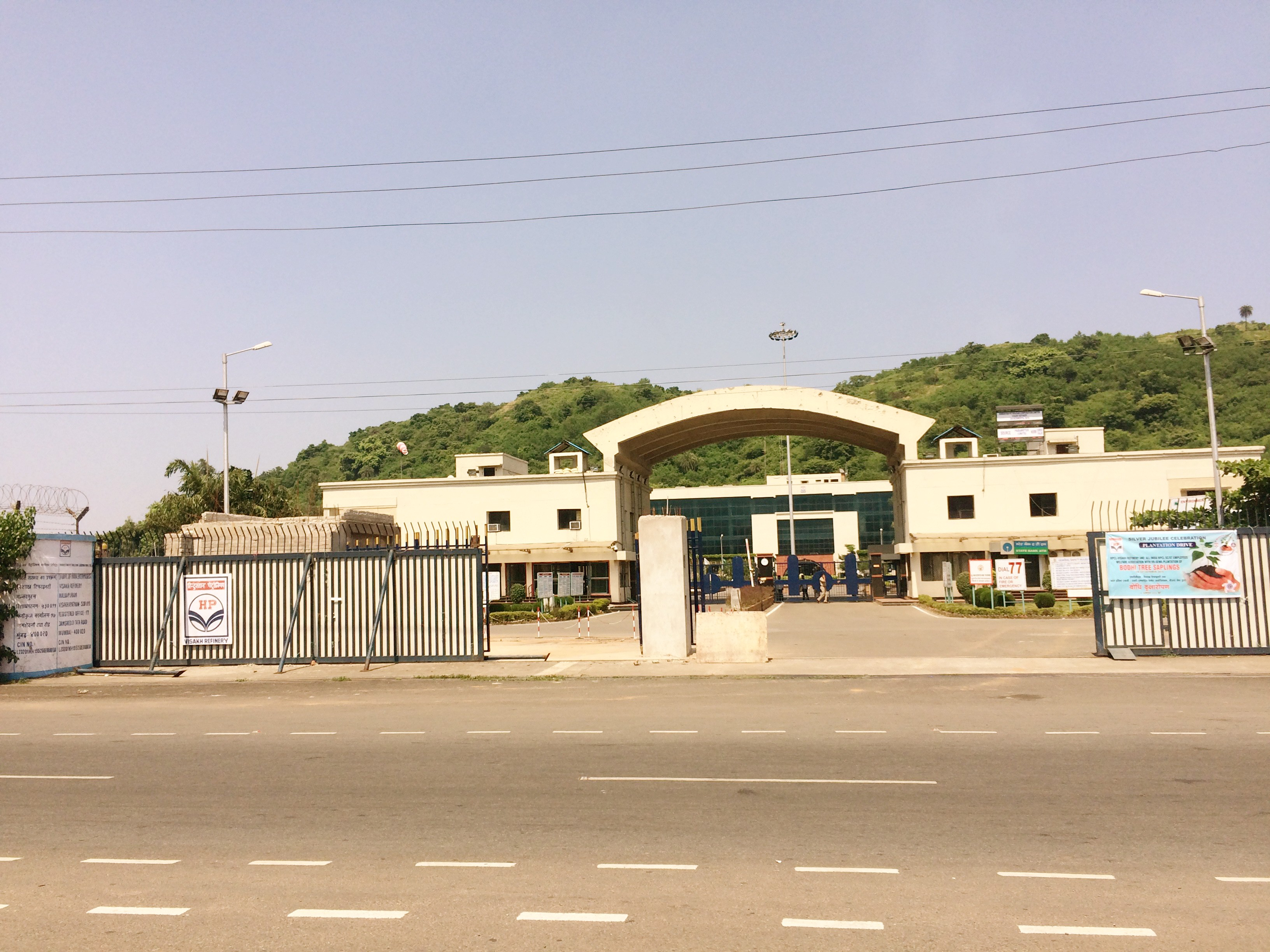
HP oil refinery in Visakhapatnam

HPCL operates refineries in India, including:

- Mumbai Refinery: 9.8 million metric tons capacity (fuel and lubes)
- Visakhapatnam Refinery: 15 million metric tons capacity (fuel)
- Mangalore Refinery: 9.69 million metric tons capacity (HPCL has a 16.65% stake)
- Guru Gobind Singh Refinery (Bathinda): 9 million metric tons capacity (HPCL and Mittal Energy each have a 49% stake)
- Barmer Refinery: 9 million metric tons capacity (HPCL has a 74%, Government of Rajasthan has a 24% stake)

In addition, HPCL operates other manufacturing facilities, including:

- Silvassa Lube: an automated installation and plant for grease and specialties
- Lube & Grease manufacturing facility (Mazagaon, Mumbai)
- LPG storage Cavern: a storage facility of LPG at Vizag—SALPG
- Pipelines: MPSPL, MDPL, VVSPL, MHMSPL, RKPL, ASPL, RBPL
- Several terminals and depots
- Many liquified petroleum gas bottling plants
- HPCL Green R&D Centre (Bangalore)

== Products ==
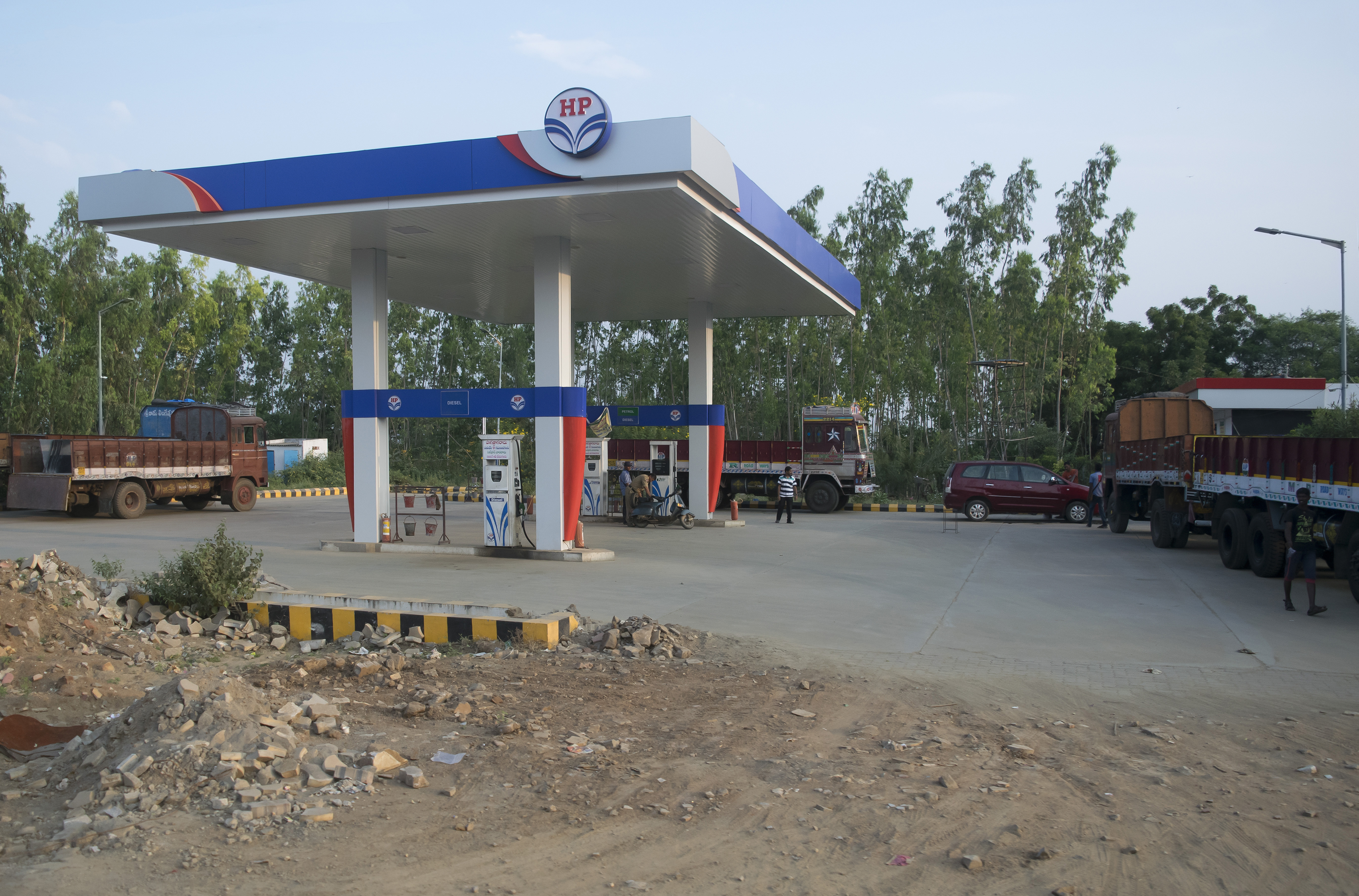
HP petrol pump

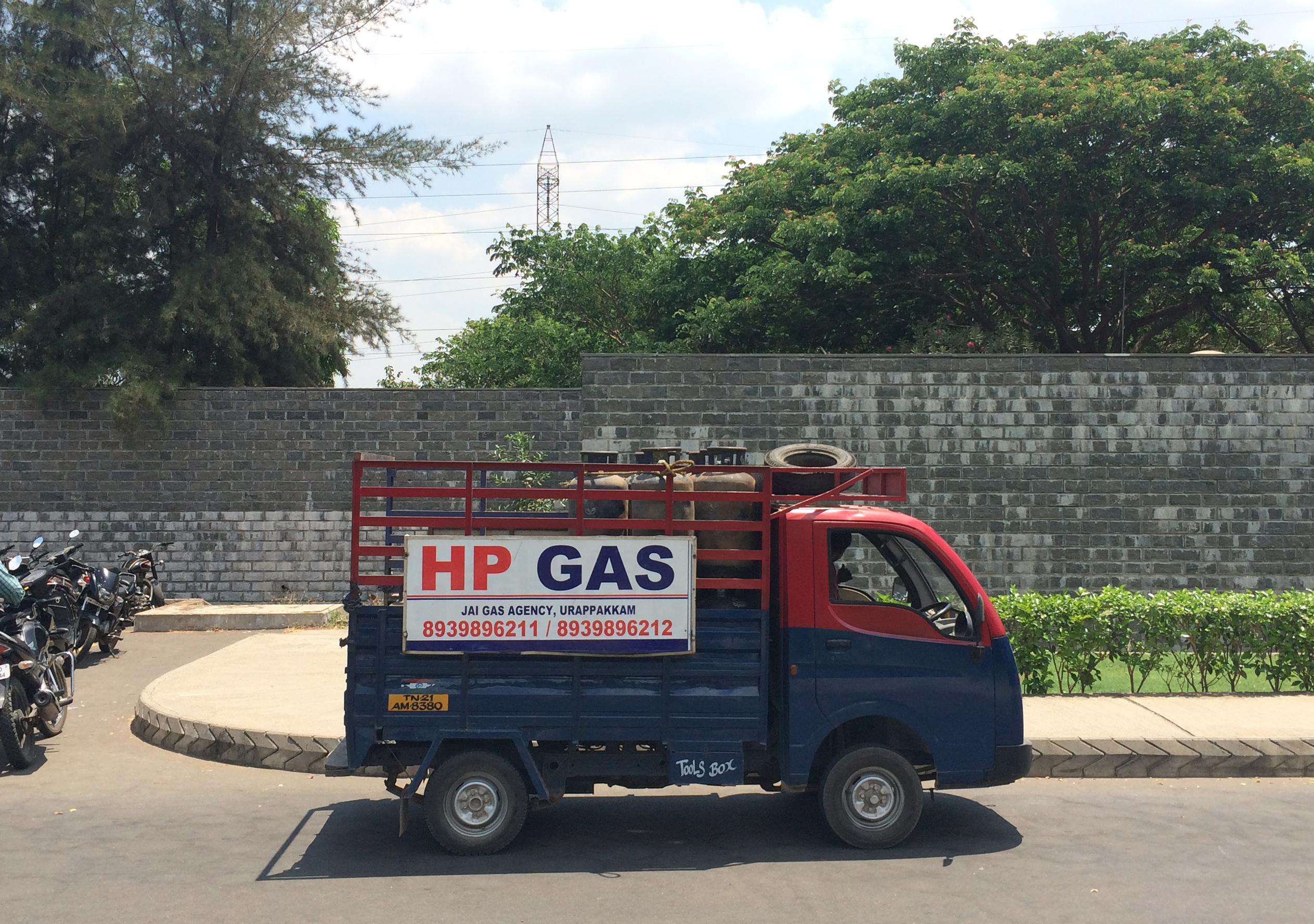
HP cooking gas delivery vehicle

HPCL produces a wide variety of petroleum fuels and specialties:

- Petrol (known as "motor spirit" in the oil industry) – HPCL markets its petrol at its retail pumps all over India. Its principal consumers are personal vehicle owners.
- Diesel (known as "high-speed diesel" in the oil industry) – HPCL markets its diesel at its retail pumps, terminals, and depots. Its consumers include personal vehicle owners, transport agencies, and industries.
- Lubricants – HPCL is the market leader in lubricants and associated products. It commands over 30% of the market share in this sector. The popular brands of HP lubes are Laal Ghoda, HP Milcy, Thanda Raja, Koolgard, and Racer4.
- Liquefied petroleum gas – HPCL's brand of liquified petroleum gas is popular across India for domestic and industrial uses.
- Aviation fuel – With major air service facilities in all major airports of India, HPCL is a key player in this sector, supplying turbine fuel to major airlines. It also supplies fuel to the US.
- Emulsions – HPCL manufactures White spirit oil.

HPCL also offers HP Drive Track Plus cards for consumers purchasing their products, and provides cashback as per the government cashback offers.

== International rankings ==
- HPCL is a Fortune Global 500 company and was ranked at position 259 in 2013. In 2016, HPCL was ranked 367.
- HPCL was featured on the Forbes Global 2000 list for 2013 at position 1217.
- HPCL was the 10th most valuable brand in India according to an annual survey conducted by Brand Finance and The Economic Times in 2010.

== Major ongoing projects ==
- Uran–Chakan–Shikrapur LPG Pipeline (UCSPL)
- Vijayawada–Dharmapuri Pipeline (VDPL)
- Palanpur Vadodara Pipeline (PVPL)
- Visakhapatnam Refinery Modernization Project
- Mumbai Refinery Expansion Project

== Subsidiaries ==
Hindustan Petroleum Gas

HPCL is focused on the appraisal and development of hydrocarbon accumulations in onshore and offshore projects. Operating projects include the Hirapur Marginal oil fields of the Cambay basin (near Gandhinagar, Gujarat) under a service contract with ONGC, and the pre-NELP production sharing contract for the Sanganpur field (Mehsana) with M/s Hydrocarbon Development Company (P) Ltd.

- HPCL Biofuels Limited
- CREDA-HPCL Biofuels Limited
- HP Gas (domestic and industrial natural gas)
- HPCL LNG Limited: A wholly-owned subsidiary that operates a greenfield liquefied natural gas (LNG) storage and regasification terminal in Chhara, Gujarat. Built with an investment of ₹4,750 crore, the terminal has an initial capacity of 5 million metric tonnes per annum (MMTPA) and began commercial operations in early 2025.

== See also ==
- List of companies of India
- List of largest companies by revenue
- List of public corporations by market capitalization
- Make in India
- Forbes Global 2000
- Fortune India 500
- Rajiv Gandhi Institute of Petroleum Technology
