= History of the oil industry in India =

The history of the Indian oil industry extends back to the period of the British Raj, at a time when petroleum first became a primary global energy source.

== Colonial rule, 1858-1947 ==
1866 : Oil discovery at Nahorpung, Assam. Not explored. 1882 : Big "Oil Seepage" in Digboi during construction of Dibrugarh-Ledo Railway Line. The first oil production started in India in 1889 near the town of Digboi in the state of Assam. A Small thatched structure was erected and christened "Oil well no.1" or "Discovery". This discovery came on the heels of industrial development. The Assam Railways and Trading Company (ARTC) had recently opened the area for trade by building a railway and later finding oil nearby. The first well was completed in 1890 and in 1893 first refinery started at Margharita, Assam. The Assam Oil Company was established in 1899 to oversee production. In 1901, Digboi Refinery was commissioned supplanting the earlier refinery at Margharita. At its peak during the Second World War the Digboi oil fields were producing 7,000 barrels per day.. In the year 1909, IBP (Indo Burmah Petroleum) was incorporated in Rangoon to explore oil wells that had been discovered in Burma and Assam.

Oil in colonial India was mostly exploited by a number of British companies with intricate alliances. Their output began to increase during the first and second world wars to support British troops and industries in the United Kingdom.

In 1928, Asiatic Petroleum Company ( India) started cooperation with Burmah Oil Company. This alliance led to the formation of Burmah-Shell Oil Storage and Distributing Company of India Limited. Burmah-Shell began its operations with import and marketing of Kerosene. On 24 January 1976, the Burmah Sell was taken over by the Government of India to form Bharat Refineries Limited. On 1 August 1977, it was renamed as Bharat Petroleum Corporation Limited.

== Independence, 1947-1991 ==
After India won independence in 1947, the new government moved to a less exploitative system, often termed as License Raj. In terms of economic policy this meant a far bigger role for the government and little or no role for the private sector. This resulted in a bureaucratic system that meant a large public sector and focus on centralized planning.

The foreign companies continued to play a key role in the oil industry. Oil India Limited was still a joint venture involving the Indian government and the British owned Burmah Oil Company (presently, BP) whilst the Indo-Stanvac Petroleum project in West Bengal was between the Indian government and the American company SOCONY-Vacuum (presently, ExxonMobil). This changed in 1956 when the government adopted an industrial policy that placed oil as a “schedule A industry” and put its future development in the hands of the state. In October 1959 an Act of Parliament was passed which gave the state owned Oil and Natural Gas Commission (ONGC) the powers to plan, organise, and implement programmes for the development of oil resources and the sale of petroleum products and also to perform plans sent down from central government.

In order to find the expertise necessary to reach these goals foreign experts from West Germany, Romania, the US, and the Soviet Union were brought in. The Soviet experts were the most influential and they drew up detailed plans for further oil exploration which were to form part of the second five-year plan. India thus adopted the Soviet model of economic development and the state continues to implement five-year plans as part of its drive towards modernity. The increased focus on exploration resulted in the discovery of several new oil fields most notably the off-shore Bombay High field which remains by a long margin India's most productive well.

== Liberalisation, 1991-present ==
The process of economic liberalisation in India began in 1991 when India defaulted on her loans and asked for a $1.8 billion bailout from the IMF. This was a trickle-down effect of the culmination of the cold war era; marked by the 1991 collapse of the Soviet Union, India's main trading partner. The bailout was done on the condition that the government initiate further reforms, thus paving the way for India's emergence as a free market economy, which would open up its markets to western companies.

For the ONGC this meant being reorganised into a public limited company (it is now called for Oil and Natural Gas Corporation) and around 2% of government held stocks were sold off. Despite this however the government still plays a pivotal role and ONGC is still responsible for 77% of oil and 81% of gas production while the Indian Oil Corporation (IOC) owns most of the refineries putting it within the top 20 oil companies in the world. The government also maintains subsidised prices. As a net importer of oil however India faces the problem of meeting the energy demands for its rapidly expanding population and economy and to this the ONGC has pursued drilling rights in Iran and Kazakhstan and has acquired shares in exploration ventures in Indonesia, Libya, Nigeria, and Sudan.

India's choice of energy partners however, most notably Iran led to concerns radiating from the US. A key issue today is the proposed gas pipeline that will run from Turkmenistan to India through politically unstable Afghanistan and also through Pakistan. However, despite India's strong economic links with Iran, India voted with the US when Iran's nuclear program was discussed by the International Atomic Energy Agency although there are still very real differences between the two countries when it comes to dealing with Iran.

== See also ==
- History of the petroleum industry in Canada
- History of the petroleum industry in the United States
