= Digboi =

- City
- Digboi
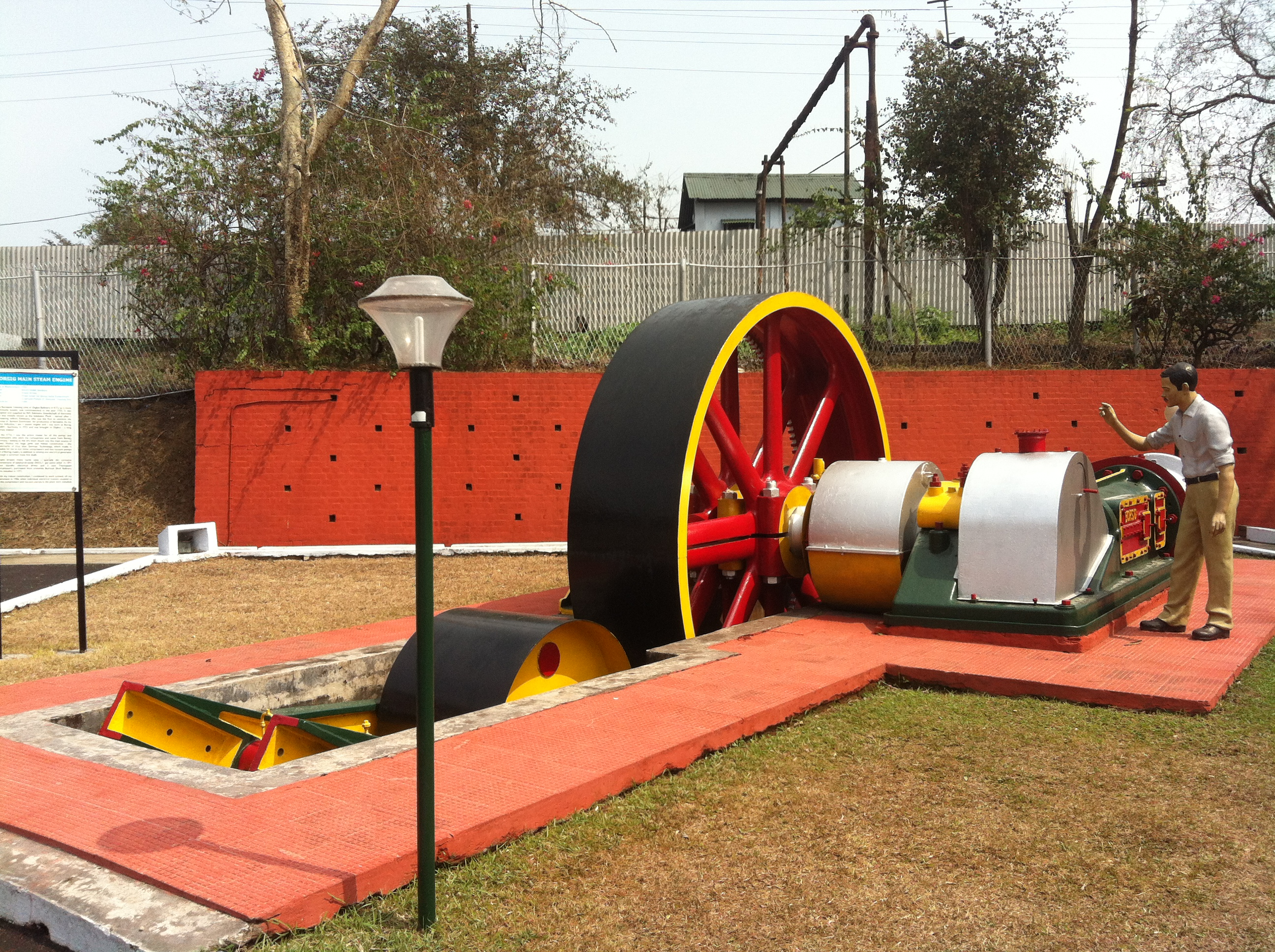
- Digboi Centenary Museum

- Location in Assam, India Digboi (India)
- Coordinates: 27.38°N 95.63°E
- Country: India
- State: Assam
- District: Tinsukia

Government
  - Type: Mayor Council Government under State Government
  - Body: Digboi Municipality

Area
  - Total: 14.8 km^{2} (5.7 sq mi)
- Elevation: 165 m (541 ft)

Population (2025)
  - Total: 41,736
  - Density: 2,820/km^{2} (7,300/sq mi)

Languages
  - Official: Assamese
- Time zone: UTC+5:30 (IST)
- PIN: 786171
- ISO 3166 code: IN-AS
- Vehicle registration: AS-23

Digboi (IPA: ˈdɪgˌbɔɪ) is a city and a Digboi Municipal Corporation in Tinsukia district in the north-eastern part of the state of Assam, India.

Crude oil was discovered here in late 19th century and first oil well was dug in 1866. Digboi is known as the Oil City of Assam where the first oil well in Asia was drilled. The first refinery was started here as early as 1901. Digboi has the oldest oil well in operation in India. With a significant number of British professionals working for Assam Oil Company until the decade following independence of India, Digboi had a well-developed infrastructure and a number of bungalows unique to the town. It has an eighteen holes golf course as part of the Digboi Club. It has guest houses and tourist residential apartments laid to promote tourism in upper Assam.

== Etymology ==
In 1867, Italian Engineers were commissioned by the Assam Railways and Trading Company to build a railway line from Dibrugarh to Margherita (Headquarters of Assam Railways and Trading Company). They accidentally discovered oil at Digboi around 10 miles from Margherita.

"'Dig boy, dig', shouted the Canadian engineer, W. L. Lake, at his men as they watched elephants emerging out of the dense forest with oil stains on their feet". This is possibly the most distilled – though fanciful – version of the legend explaining the siting and naming of Digboi. Two events separated by seven years have become fused, but although neither is likely to be provable, such evidence that does exist appears sufficiently detailed to be credible.
Various web sites offer variations on the elephant's foot story, a consensus of which would be that engineers extending the Dibru-Sadiya railway line to Ledo for the Assam Railways and Trading Company (AR&TC) in 1882 were using elephants for haulage and noticed that the mud on one pachyderm's feet smelled of oil. Retracing the trail of footprints, they found oil seeping to the surface. One of the engineers, the Englishman (not Canadian) Willie Leova Lake, was an 'oil enthusiast' and persuaded the company to drill a well.

Oil India's web site contains no history of the Assam Oil Company's origins, but an earlier incarnation claimed that the "decision to drill was taken by the Directors of the AR&T Co. in 1888 under the direction of Mr. W L Lake, an employee of the company and an oil enthusiast". Once the project had been approved, Lake assembled equipment, boilers, and local labour, and engaged elephants to haul the machinery to the site. The first well was started in September 1889, but an encouraging first strike at 178 feet (54 m) turned out to be a small pocket, and drilling recommenced. This continued until November 1890 when the well was completed at a total depth of 662 feet (202 m), and it was during this extended period of drilling that Assam Oil Company's magazine adverts placed the legend of Lake exhorting one or more of his labourers to "Dig, boy!".

== History ==
In 1889, the English started a small oil installation at Digboi. In the year 1901, an oil refinery was started at Digboi, thus providing India as well as the continent of Asia with its first refinery. Assam Oil Company was formed in 1899 to look after the running of the oil business in this area. The Digboi oil field produced close to 7,000 barrels per day (1,100 m^{3}/d) of crude oil at its peak, which was during World War II. The field was pushed to produce the maximum amount of oil with little regard to reservoir management; as a result, production started to drop almost immediately after the war. The current production from the Digboi fields is about 240 barrels per day (38 m^{3}/d). Over 1,000 wells have been drilled at Digboi. In 1989, the Department of Posts, India came out with a stamp commemorating 100 years of the Digboi fields.

Today, though the crude production is not high, Digboi is still India's oldest continuously producing oilfield. Digboi refinery, now a division of Indian Oil Corporation, had a capacity of about 0.65 million tonnes per year as of 2003.

Digboi is now the Headquarters of Assam Oil Division of Indian Oil Corporation Limited. The Earliest recorded to the existence of oil in India is found in the memories and dispatches of the Army Officers who penetrated the jungles of Upper Assam since 1825. Lt. R. Wilcox, Major A. White, Capt. Francis Jenkins, Capt. P.S. Hanney—they all saw at different times petroleum exuding from banks of the Dihing River. C.A. Bruce (1828) and H.B. Medicott (1865) of the Geological Survey of India also saw oil while prospecting for coal in Upper Assam.

Mr. Goodenough of McKillop, Stewart & Co. Calcutta was the first in India to start a systematic programme of drilling for oil in November 1866, at Nahorpung about 30 miles (48 km) south east of Dibgoi, just seven years after the world's first commercial oil well was drilled in 1859, by Col Edwin L Drake in Pennsylvania, USA. This hand dug well—the first oil well in India—was drilled up to 102 feet (31 m) and proved dry. However, the second well struck oil at Makum near Tinsukia, about 14 miles (23 km) from Digboi.

In 1939, there was a major labour union strike in the Refinery. The Gandhi Movement of Congress for Indian Independence struggle; backed by labour rights and equality status was headed by Sardar Amar Singh Marwah. The break of the World War II coincided with the Digboi labour strike resulted in harsh steps taken by the British Administrative offices to crush the strike. The Viceroy and the Governor intervened and adopted sturdy steps to crush the union by shooting down of the president of the labour union which was to be followed by issuing orders of Quit Digboi, Quit Lakhimpur and finally Quit Assam to the leaders of the labour union.

=== Digboi Refinery ===
The Digboi Refinery modernization project was taken up in large-scale in order to overcome the technological obsolescence of the old refinery. Subsequently, a number of other major projects were undertaken by Assam Oil Division to further revamp and modernize Digboi Refinery. Digboi refinery has been awarded the ISO-14001 and OHSMC certificate.

== Geography ==
Digboi is located at 27°22'48.0"N 95°37'48.0"E. It has an average elevation of 165 metres (541 ft).It is situated 510 km north east of Guwahati.

== Demographics ==
As of 2011 census, Digboi has population of 21,736 individuals, of which 10,964 are males while 10,772 are females. The population of children aged 0-6 is 1745 which is 8.03% of total population of Digboi. Committee, the female sex ratio is 982 against state average of 958. Moreover, the child sex ratio in Digboi is around 981 compared to Assam state average of 962. The literacy rate of Digboi city at 92.08% is higher than the state average of 72.19%. In Digboi, male literacy is around 95.09% while the female literacy rate is 89.02%.

Languages spoken in Digboi city (2011)
1. Bengali (55.8%)
2. Assamese (17.7%)
3. Hindi (15.8%)
4. Nepali (6.35%)
5. Others (4.33%)

Digboi city has a population of 21,736 individuals as per the 2011 census. Bengali is spoken by ~12,135 individuals, Assamese is spoken by ~3,845 individuals, Hindi is spoken by ~3,440 individuals, and Nepali is spoken by ~1,381 individuals; the rest ~941 speak other languages.

Digboi Oil Town was considered as a separate census town in 2011 India census. The population is largely heterogeneous. Assamese, Bengali, Nepali, Bihari, Marwari communities form the majority. People from various tribes such as the tea-tribes (brought in by the colonial planters as indentured labourers from the Chhota Nagpur plateau region), Bodos, Mishings etc. have also made it their home.

== Education ==
=== Colleges ===
- Digboi College
- Digboi Mahila Mahavidyalaya

== Places of interest ==
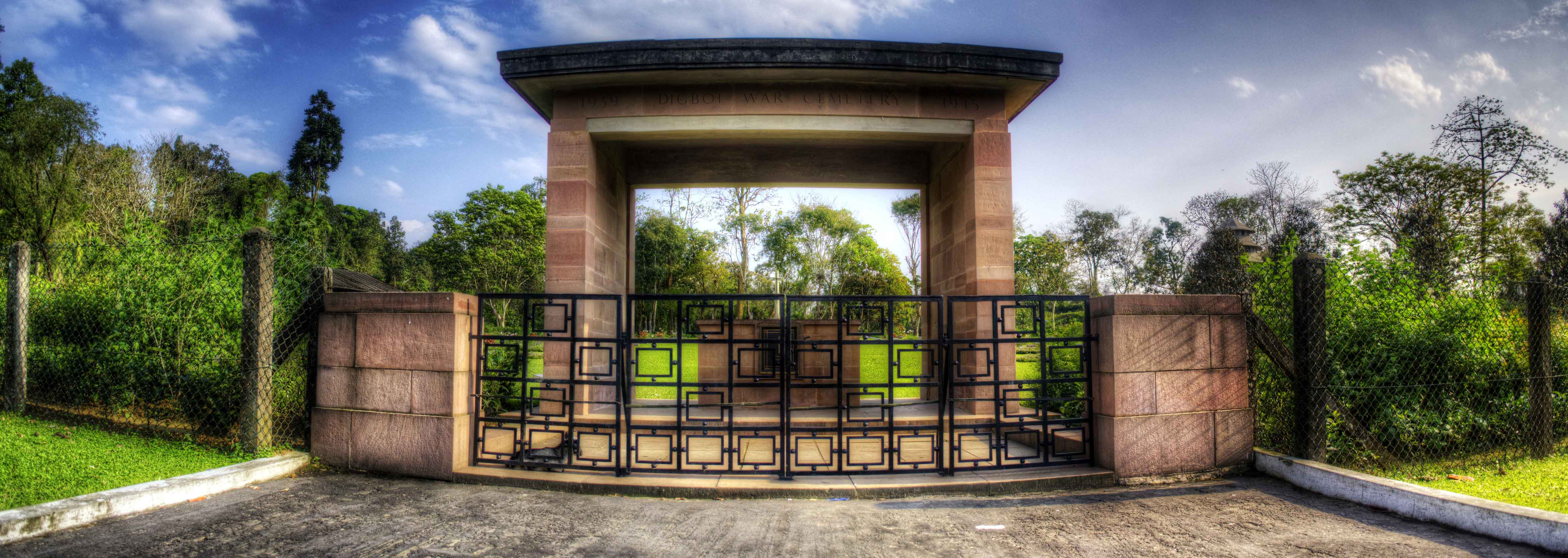
Digboi War Cemetery

- Digboi Oil Centenary Museum
- Digboi War Cemetery
- Digboi 18-hole Golf Course
- Digboi Oil Field
- Digboi Centenary Park
- Digboi Bar

== Politics ==
Digboi is part of Dibrugarh constituency of the Lok Sabha which is represented by Sarbananda Sonowal of Bharatiya Janata Party.

It also lies in the Digboi Constituency of the State Assembly or Vidhan Sabha where it is represented by Suren Phukan of Bharatiya Janata Party.

== See also ==
- Digboi Refinery
- Bombay High
