= Mumbai Refinery (HPCL) =

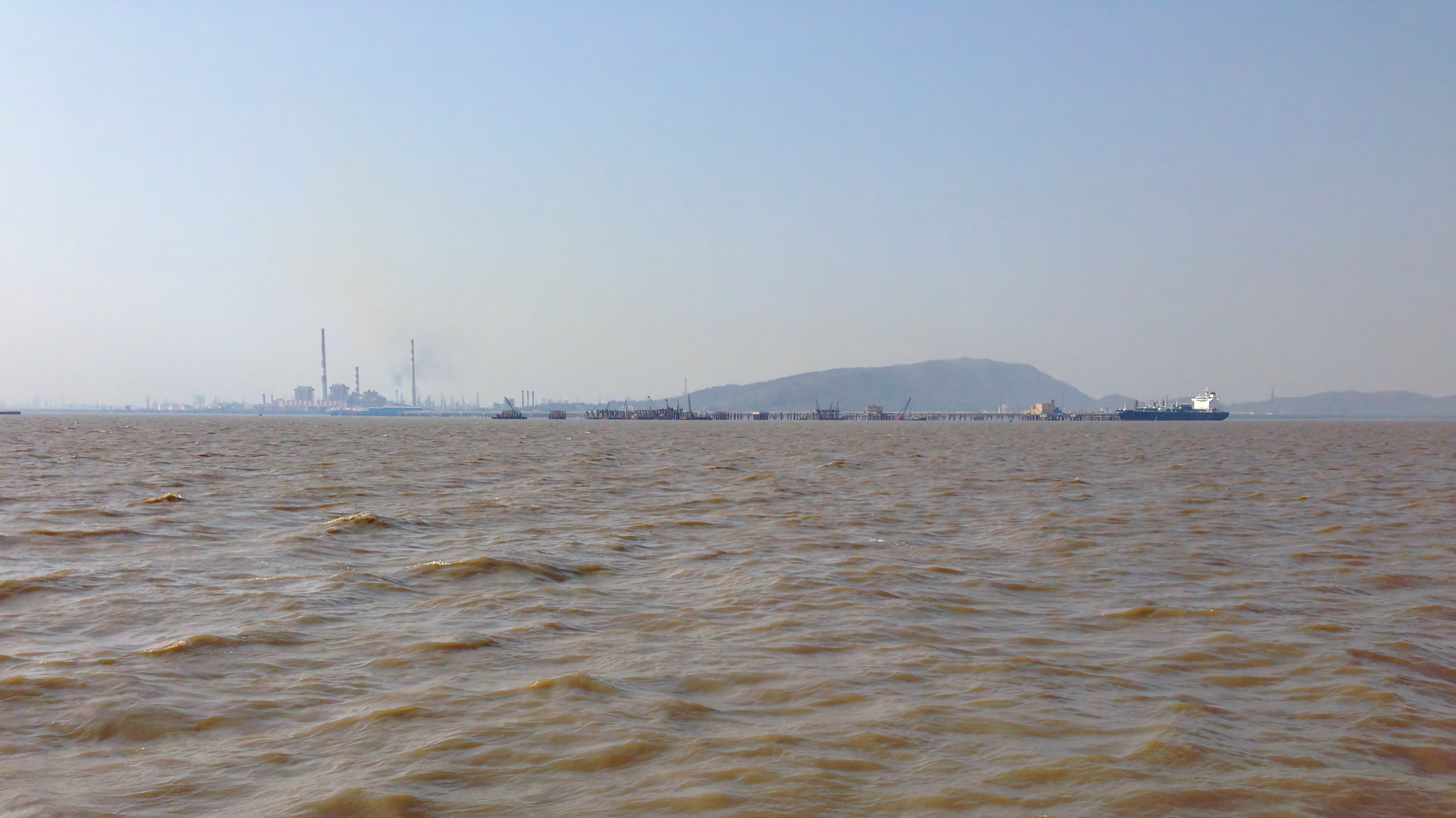
View of Mumbai refinery from Bombay Harbor

The HPCL Mumbai refinery is one of the most complex refineries in the country, is constructed on an area of 321 acres (130 ha). This versatile refinery which is the first of India's modern refineries, symbolizes the country's industrial strength and progress in the oil industry. Mumbai Refinery has grown over the years as the main hub of petroleum products. The refinery has reached to present level through several upgradation and restructuring processes.

== History ==
The Mumbai Refinery was commissioned by Esso Standard in 1954 (71 years ago), with an installed capacity of 1.25 million tonnes per year. The lube refinery, Lube India Ltd, was commissioned in 1969 (56 years ago) with a capacity of 165 million tonnes per year of Lube Oil Base Stock (LOBS) production.

Crude processing capacity increased to 3.5 million tonnes per year during 1969. In 1974, the Government of India took over Esso and Lube India by the Esso (Acquisition of Undertakings in India) Act 1974 and formed HPCL.

Expansion of the fuels block was carried out by installing new 2 million tonnes per year crude units in 1985. A second expansion of Lube Refinery took place to increase the capacity of the refinery to 335 million tonnes per year, so far the largest in India. The installed capacity of the refinery was later enhanced to 6.5 million tonnes per year.

The current installed capacity of the refinery is 9.5 million tonnes per year.
