= Mumbai Refinery (BPCL) =

Oil refinery in Mumbai, India

Bharat Petroleum Mumbai Refinery
- Location within India
- Location: Wadala East, Mumbai, Maharashtra, India; 19.011939°N 72.860086°E

Refinery details
- Operator: Bharat Petroleum
- Owner: Bharat Petroleum
- Opened: January 1955
- Capacity: 12 (106 tonnes/y)
- Complexity index: 21.1

Bharat Petroleum Mumbai Refinery is an oil refinery located in Wadala East, Mumbai, India.

== History ==
The refinery commenced operation in January 1955 under the ownership of Burmah-Shell Refineries Ltd. Following the Government's acquisition of the Burmah-Shell, name of the Refinery was changed to Bharat Refineries Limited on 1976. In August 1977, the company was given its permanent name, viz. Bharat Petroleum Corporation Limited (BPCL).

The installed capacity of 5.25 million tonnes per year was increased to 6 million tonnes per year in 1985. The present refining capacity of the refinery is 6.9 million tonnes per year. It was expanded to 12 million tonnes per year in a Refinery Modernization Project undertaken by the company. The project added CDU/VDU, HCU, LOBS, HGU units in additions to the required utilities such as DG, Salt Water Systems etc.
