= Yarada =

- Neighbourhood
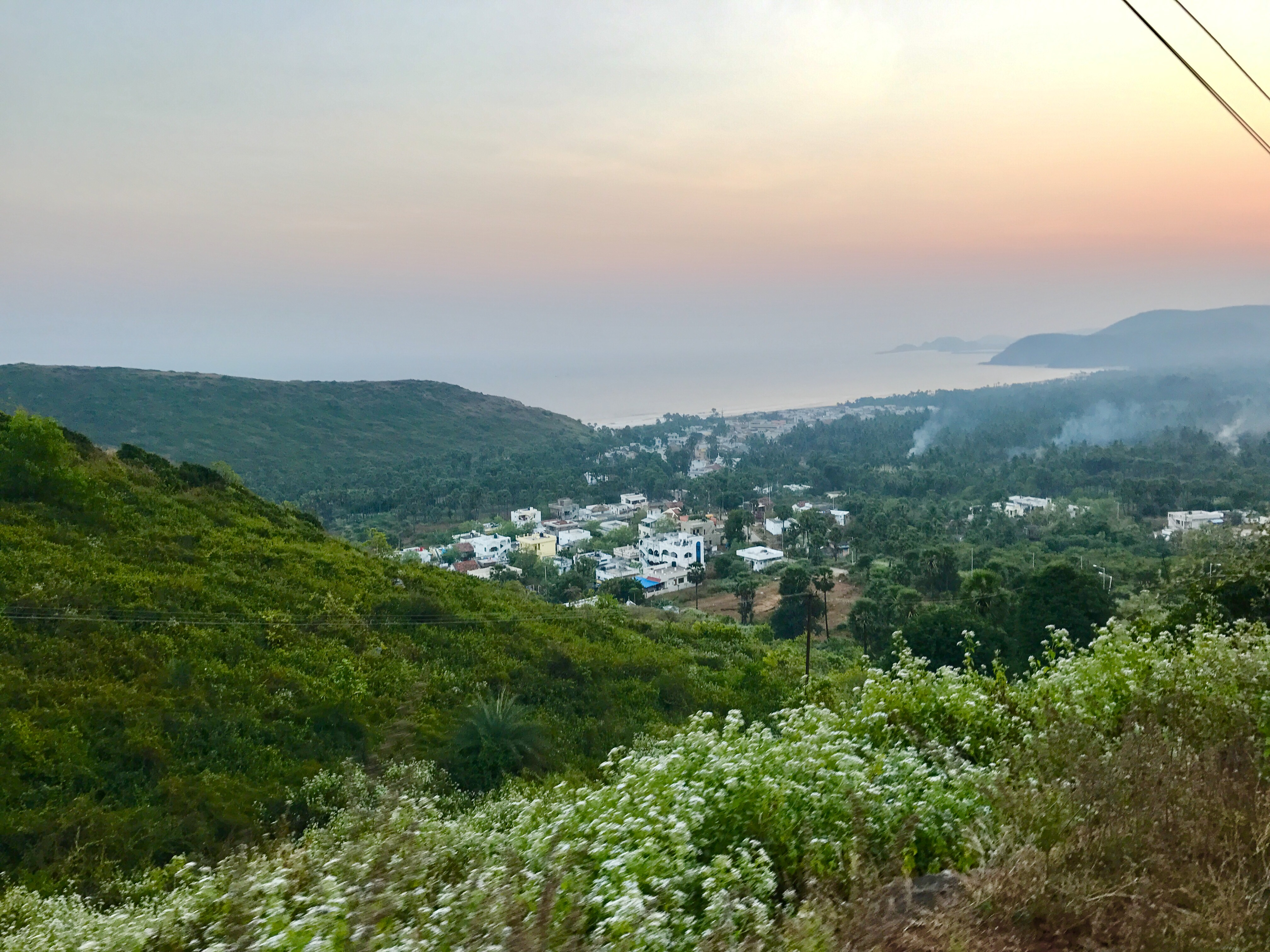

- Location in Visakhapatnam
- Coordinates: 17.660309°N 83.276449°E
- Country: India
- State: Andhra Pradesh
- District: Visakhapatnam

Government
  - Body: Greater Visakhapatnam Municipal Corporation

Languages
  - Official: Telugu
- Time zone: UTC+5:30 (IST)
- PIN: 530005
- Vehicle registration: AP-31,32

Yarada is a neighborhood situated on the Visakhapatnam City, India. It is famous for its beach and a hill road to reach the beach. It is one of the scarcely populated beaches in the city. The area, which falls under the local administrative limits of Greater Visakhapatnam Municipal Corporation and is well known for Yarada Beach. ..Yarada is a part in Gajuwaka Mandal.

== Transport ==
APSRTC routes

Route number	Start	End	Via
16	Yarada	Poorna Market	Naval Base, Scindia, Convent Junction
55Y	Scindia	Simhachalam	Naval Base, Scindia, Malkapuram, New Gajuwaka, Old Gajuwaka, BHPV, NAD Kotharoad, Gopalapatnam
