= Engineers India =

Indian public sector engineering company pvt ltd

Engineers India Limited
- Type: Public
- Traded as: BSE: 532178; NSE: ENGINERSIN
- Industry: Engineering consulting EPC
- Founded: 1965
- Headquarters: India
- Key people: Shri Atul Gupta (Chairman & MD)
- Revenue: ▲₹3,104.69 crore (US$320 million) (2021)
- Operating income: ▲₹350.57 crore (US$36 million) (2021)
- Net income: ▲₹259.50 crore (US$27 million) (2021)
- Total assets: ▲₹4,378.23 crore (US$450 million) (2021)
- Total equity: ▲₹1,700 crore (US$180 million) (2021)
- Owner: Government of India (51.32%)
- Number of employees: 2,653 (March 2025)
- Website: engineersindia.com

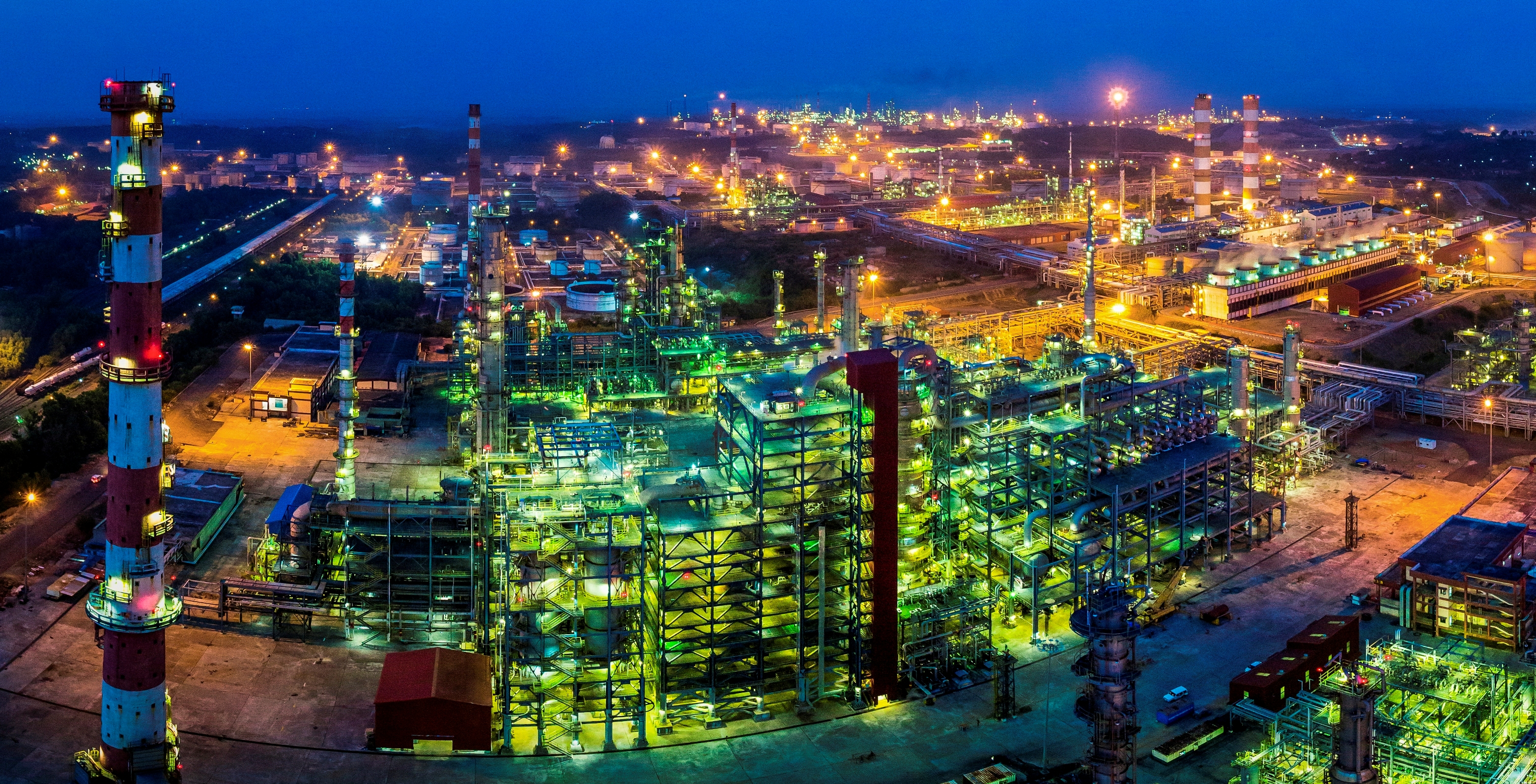
MRPL Refinery Phase-III expansion Project, a major oil refinery project undertaken by EIL

Engineers India Limited (EIL) is an Indian public sector industrial technology, engineering consultancy and technology licensing company. It was set up in 1965 with the mandate of providing indigenous technology solutions across hydrocarbon projects. Over the years, it has also diversified into synergic sectors like non-ferrous metallurgy, infrastructure, water and wastewater management and fertilizers.

EIL is headquartered at Bhikaji Cama Place, New Delhi. EIL also has an R&D complex at Gurgaon, a branch office in Mumbai, regional offices at Kolkata, Chennai, Vadodara.

EIL has a wholly owned subsidiary Certification Engineers International Limited (CEIL). It has set up a joint venture company namely Ramagundam Fertilizers and Chemicals Limited (RFCL) for enhancing the presence in fertilizers sector.

Making its entry into the downstream oil and gas operations, EIL in 2021 acquired a minority stake in Numaligarh Refinery Limited (NRL) in Assam. Partnering with Oil India Ltd. (OIL), which led the consortium, EIL participated in the acquisition of the stake previously held by Bharat Petroleum Corporation Limited (BPCL).[

As of March 2025, EIL’s workforce comprises 2,653 employees.

The state-owned firm was accorded the Navratna status by the Government of India in 2014.

== History ==
EIL was incorporated on March 15, 1965, as a private limited company under the name Engineers India Private Limited pursuant to a memorandum of agreement dated June 27, 1964 between the Government of India and Bechtel International Corporation. In May 1967, Bechtel withdrew from the company and EIL became a wholly owned Government of India (GoI) enterprise.

EIL has also ventured into various unconventional energy resource projects such as solar, 2G ethanol and biofuels.

== Research and development ==
The company's research and development center in Gurugram is undertaking technology development both in-house and in collaboration with other organizations like IOCL-R&D, BPCL-R&D, IIP, CHT, HPCL, CPCL, NRL including.

== Green energy business ==
EIL is undertaking projects in the green energy segment with focus on green hydrogen, biofuels and offshore wind. It is involved in the implementation of biorefinery projects in India, in addition to providing services for the development of green hydrogen production facilities and Bio-ATF (Aviation Turbine Fuel) plants.

The company is providing its services in the implementation of one of the largest capacities biorefinery projects in India for Assam Biorefinery Private Limited (ABRPL) in Numaligarh, Assam.

It is also engaged in setting up bio-ATF plants in India in collaboration with Council of Scientific and Industrial Research–Indian Institute of Petroleum (CSIR-IIP) and has already developed a Basic Engineering and Design Package (BEDP) for a similar facility in Mangalore Refinery and Petrochemicals Limited (MRPL)

Besides, the company has delivered Engineering, Procurement and Construction Management (EPCM) services to GAIL (India) for the Balance of Plant (BoP), and related facilities, for a 10 MW green hydrogen production facility in Uttar Pradesh’s Vijaipur

NTPC Ltd and Engineers India Ltd (EIL) have signed an agreement to set up a coal-to-synthetic natural gas (coal-to-SNG) facility that will convert high-ash Indian coal into cleaner fuel.

== Infrastructure ==
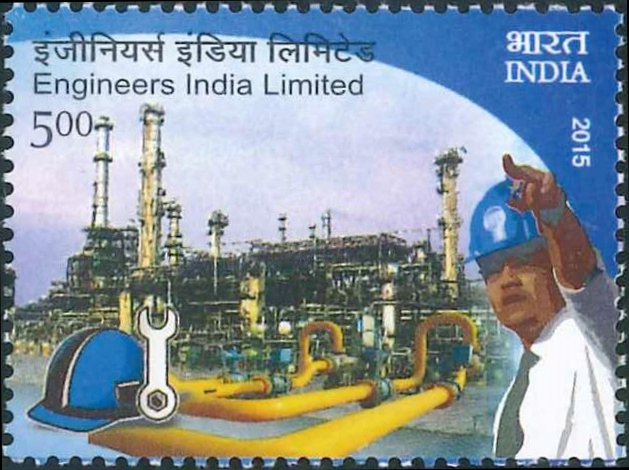
Engineers India 2015 stamp

EIL also undertakes various urban development projects such as airports, data centres, international market places, institutional campuses and restoration of heritage sites.It has worked on major infrastructure projects such as the Jewar International Airport in Noida, Leh Airport, Mopa Airport, Data Centres for State Bank of India (SBI) and Reserve Bank of India (RBI), IIM Nagpur campus and restoration of heritage sites like Khajuraho and Sun temple of Konark in Odisha.

As part of furthering India’s ‘Green Growth’ agenda, the Ministry of Housing and Urban Affairs, Government of India signed a Memorandum of Understanding (MoU) with EIL to develop ‘Waste to Energy’ and bio-methanation projects in cities with a population of million plus under the SBM-GOBARdhan scheme. EIL will provide technical assistance to cities in developing such projects for a larger quantum of waste, integrating circularity in waste management.

== Global Flagship Projects ==
EIL has expanded its business in new geographies with ongoing projects in engineering, design and construction supervision for refineries, pipelines and power plants across Africa, Asia, Latin America and the Middle East.

== See also ==
Jakson Group
