= Essar Energy =

Energy company of India in Mauritius

Essar Energy plc
- Type: Subsidiary
- Industry: Oil and gas, Energy
- Founded: 1998
- Headquarters: Port Louis, Mauritius
- Key people: Prashant Ruia (Chairman and Non- Executive Director), S Thangapandian (Chief Executive Officer), Simon Murray CBE (Vice Chairman)
- Products: refined petroleum products, electricity
- Revenue: US$27,257.7 million (2013)
- Operating income: US$790.8 million (2013)
- Net income: US$(175.0) million (2013)
- Parent: Essar Group
- Subsidiaries: Essar Oil

Essar Energy plc is Mauritius-based Indian energy company with assets in the power and oil and gas businesses. Headquartered in Port Louis, Mauritius and subsidiary of Essar Group, the firm has interests in both the power generation and petroleum industries. In May 2014 the company was acquired by its majority shareholder, Essar Global Fund Limited.

== History ==
Established in 1998 as a wholly owned business unit of the Essar Group conglomerate, the business was floated on the London Stock Exchange in April 2010, marking the exchange's largest initial public offering since December 2007. The company was added to the FTSE 100 Index at the subsequent quarterly review.

Essar Global Fund Limited retained an approximate 76% stake in Essar Energy. The lead underwriters to the initial public offering were JPMorgan Chase and Deutsche Bank. The primary offering raised £1.3bn. Ravi Ruia, the Chairman, and Sanjay Mehta, a senior board member of Essar Global Limited, were identified in an Economic Times of India article as instrumental in the listing.

Essar Energy announced in 2013 that it would sell its 50% stake in the Kenya Petroleum Refineries Limited to the Kenyan government and, in May 2014, the company was acquired by its majority shareholder, Essar Global Fund Limited.

The Sunday Times reported on 26 September 2021, that the company was conducting urgent talks with HM Revenue and Customs to prevent it from collapse. The company reached an agreement with HM Revenue and Customs on 29 September 2021.

== Operations ==
=== Power plants ===
Essar Energy has an installed power generation capacity of 3,910 MW across six plants.

- Essar Hazira Power Plant, Hazira, Gujarat. It is a 515 MW (1×215, 1×300 MW) gas-based thermal power plant. The plant is fully functional.
- Essar Vadinar Power Plant, Vadinar, Gujarat. It is a 1,010 MW (1×120, 1×380 MW, 1×510 MW) captive thermal power plant. The plant is fully functional.
- Essar Bhander Power Plant, Hazira, Gujarat. It is a 500 MW (1×500 MW) gas-based thermal power plant. The plant is fully functional.
- Essar Salaya Power Plant, Salaya, Gujarat. It is a 1200 MW (2×600 MW) coal-based thermal power plant. The plant is fully functional.
- Essar Algoma Power Plant, Algoma, Ontario, Canada. It is an 85 MW (1×85 MW) thermal power plant. The plant is fully functional.
- Essar Mahan Power Plant, Mahan, Singrauli district Madhya Pradesh. It is a 1,200 MW (2×600 MW) coal-based thermal power plant. One unit is functional.
- Essar Hazira-2 Power Plant, Hazira, Gujarat. It is a 270 MW (1×135 MW) thermal power plant. This plant is yet to become operational.
- Essar Tori Power Plant, Tori, Jharkhand. It is an 1,800 MW (3×600 MW) coal-based thermal power plant. This plant is yet to become operational.
- Essar Paradip Power Plant, Paradip, Odisha. It is a 120 MW (4×30 MW) coal-based thermal power plant. This plant is yet to become operational.

=== Petroleum ===
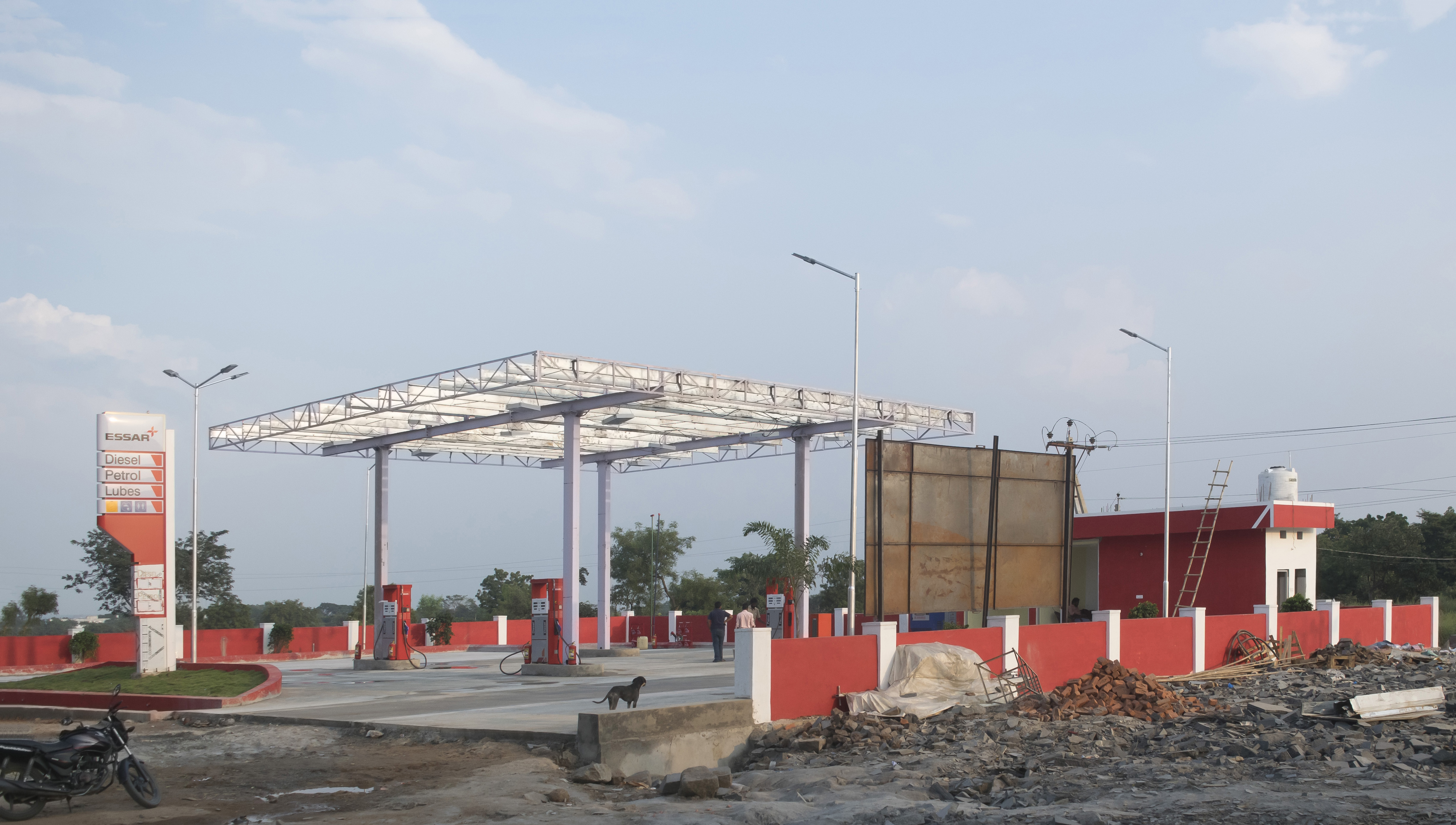
An Essar Petroleum gas station in Khammam, Telangana, India

The company has an 86% interest in a joint venture with Reliance Petroleum. Essar Oil also owns and operates Essar Refinery, a petroleum refinery at Vadinar in Gujarat's Jamnagar district. It is India's second largest refinery, which has a capacity of 18 million metric tons per annum.

The company holds both onshore and offshore petroleum exploration and production rights in India, as well as rights to a coalbed methane block. The firm also holds exploration and production interests in Nigeria, Vietnam, Australia, Indonesia, and Madagascar. In June 2012 Essar Energy received the final forest approval for developing a coal mine in Indonesia.
