= Operation Urja Suraksha =

2026 Indian maritime security operation

- Part of the 2026 Strait of Hormuz crisis
- Type: Naval operation
- Location: Arabian Sea; Strait of Hormuz; Indian Ocean
- Planned by: India
- Objective: Uninterrupted flow of energy supplies to the country; Protection of national Sea lines of communication
- Date: 23 March 2026 – present (6 months, 3 weeks and 5 days)
- Executed by: Indian Navy
- Outcome: Ongoing

Operation Urja Suraksha (lit. 'Energy protection') is a maritime security operation conducted by India to protect the nation's energy supplies by escorting Indian-flagged ships and ships destined to reach Indian ports during the 2026 Strait of Hormuz crisis.

== Background ==
Under Operation Sankalp, the Indian Navy had embarked on a policy of constant maritime patrol within the Indian Ocean region as a means to safeguard the nation's shipping interests and trade routes. The Persian Gulf plays a significant role in India's maritime trade with West Asia, from where India imports much of its oil supplies. In recent years, India has been reported to import over 80% of its petroleum and 90% of its Natural Gas via this strategic waterway. With tensions arising in the middle east following a United States buildup of ships between December 2025 and March 2026, multiple Indian naval assets were deployed across the Persian Gulf, the Red Sea , Southeast Asia and the central Indian Ocean, aimed at boosting naval diplomacy efforts.

India had reduced purchases of Iranian oil amid sanctions pressure and enforcement actions targeting Tehran's "shadow fleet" from 2019, with Indian authorities in February 2026 seizing multiple vessels linked to illicit Iranian oil shipments as part of broader efforts to curb sanctioned energy trade and align with international sanctions enforcement initiatives. Many of these vessels have been sanctioned by the United States. India also remained alert on the potential for a week-long conflict, should such a situation arise.

When the 2026 Iran war began, an Indian Navy destroyer and a frigate had been deployed in the Gulf of Oman and the Gulf of Aden under Operation Sankalp. The destroyer, INS Surat (D69), had visited Bahrain to conduct joint training with elements from the Bahraini Navy and the US-CENTCOM under Combined Task Force-154 (CTF-154). On 1 March, the Prime Minister-chaired Cabinet Committee on Security, the country's highest decision-making body on security and strategic affairs, had convened a meeting to review the West Asia conflict and its implications for India. As on 2 March, India was reported to be "closely monitoring" the situation while the warships could be immediately diverted for HADR operations, as per a senior defence official.

On 10 March, The New York Times reported that the Indian government was evaluating options to escort the Indian-flagged vessels that were stuck near the crisis-hit Strait of Hormuz. As of then, there were 36–38 such vessels with 1,100 sailors, all of which were safe with the crew members reported to be having sufficient provisions. The ships are complying to "enhanced safety protocols" including reporting to authorities at a higher frequency. Indian ship owners had requested the government for naval escorts. The NYT quoted Captain P.C. Meena, a senior member of India's apex maritime authority.

Unlike the passive monitoring protocols seen in previous years, the Navy implemented close-protection escorts for India-flagged liquefied petroleum gas (LPG) and crude oil tankers. Through back-channel negotiations led by the National Security Advisor, Ajit Doval, India may have secured an informal guarantee from Tehran for the safe passage of Indian vessels, provided they are escorted by Indian naval assets and do not carry coalition materiel.

On 25 March, Operation Urja Suraksha was reported to have been initiated to secure oil supplies from the Middle East to India. The Navy provides critical precise instructions to each ship through the Iran-controlled route, closer to the Iran coast than the official shipping lanes. Indian-headed tankers have taken routes that hug the Iranian coast before either dashing into international waters in Chabahar or sailing near Pakistani waters to avoid blockade from US Navy ships in the area.The Indian Navy vessels meet commercial shipping at a pre-arranged rendezvous point in the Gulf of Oman, safely away from both US and Iranian operational zones before escorting the ships to Indian ports.

India was also among the five nations, including China, Russia, Iraq and Pakistan, whose ships were allowed to transit the Strait of Hormuz. This was announced by the Foreign Minister of Iran, Abbas Araghchi on 26 March.

== Indian ship transits ==
=== 12–18 March ===
On 12 March, 28 Indian vessels were struck near the Strait of Hormuz including 24 on the west of the choke point carrying 668 sailors and three more vessels to the east of the strait with 76 sailors on board. Before the Indian Navy started the evacuation, the Islamic Republic of Iran Navy guided most of the Indian vessels that were allowed to cross the region. Three warships were deployed in the Gulf of Oman during 14–15 March. One warship provided escort to each commercial vessel crossing the strait while two more remained on standby. Two task forces were reportedly deployed under Operation Sankalp. Indian Navy MH-60R helicopters were also seen engaged for maritime patrol.

INS Surat also rescued eight Pakistani fishermen on 15 March who were stranded 170 nmi (310 km) east of Oman's Port of Duqm after their fishing vessel Islami had a fire accident.

Ship(s) transitting	Ownership	Port of departure	Port of arrival	Ref
Ship(s) transitting	Payload	Date of crossing the strait	Date of arrival	Ref
Details
Jag Prakash (India)	Great Eastern Shipping	(Oman) Sohar Port	(Tanzania) Port of Tanga	
Jag Prakash (India)	Crude oil	13 March	22 March	
The ship was on the east of the strait sailed away safely, carrying oil from the Sohar Port to the Port of Tanga.
MT Shivalik (India) MT Nanda Devi (India)	Shipping Corporation of India (chartered by the Indian Oil Corporation)	(Qatar) Ras Laffan Industrial City	(India) Mundra Port (India) Kandla Port	
MT Shivalik (India) MT Nanda Devi (India)	Liquified Petroleum Gas (46,200 tonnes) Liquified Petroleum Gas (46,500 tonnes)	14 March	16 March 17 March	
MT Shivalik had loaded LPG from Qatar on 26 February and was scheduled to depart on 28 February, when the war begun. The ship was asked to move to Ras Laffan port and then to Mina Saqr, Ras Al Khaimah, UAE. Yet, safety was uncertain as Dubai was one of the targets from Iranian drones and missiles. The orders to exit the Strait, a 10-hour passage, was received on 13 March. Indian Navy MH-60R helicopters were also seen engaged for maritime patrol during the escort. Each of the vessel carried approximately 32.4 lakh standard 14.2 kg domestic cylinders, meeting one day of India's LPG net import needs. Around 24,000 tonnes of LPG is expected to be dispatched to Tamil Nadu. Unloading from Shivalik and Nanda Devi was underway by 18 March. LPG carrier Apollo Ocean undertook ship-ship loading of LPG from Shivalik to New Mangalore Port. BW Birch undertook ship-ship loading of LPG From Nanda Devi at its second scheduled stop at Vadinar and delivered it to Haldia port.
Jag Laadki (India)	Great Eastern Shipping	(United Arab Emirates) Port of Fujairah	(India) Kandla Port	
Jag Laadki (India)	Crude oil (Murban) (80,800 tonnes)	16 March	18 March	
The Indian crude tanker experienced a "close call" while loading itself with Murban crude oil at Fujairah Single Point Mooring while the Fujairah oil terminal was attacked. The ship later departed the port at 10:30 am IST on 15 March. This was reported by the Ministry of Petroleum and Natural Gas. On 16 March, an Indian warship escorted the ship out of Hormuz.

Following the escort of the Shivalik and the Nanda Devi, there were 22 additional Indian ships with 611 seafarers in the west of Hormuz. All Indian seafarers are safe without any "untoward incident" in the last 24 hours, according to the Special Secretary at the Indian Shipping Ministry, Rajesh Kumar Sinha. Further, there are six more LPG tankers with a combined 3 lakh tonnes of LPG in the region.

=== 19–25 March ===
By 21 March, India was drawing up broader plans to evacuate Indian-flagged vessels from the region. If executed successfully, the operation would salvage 3 days of India's requirement of crude oil, natural gas and cooking gas. Two of the 22 ships are container ships. The remainder are energy carriers, including three LNG carriers, 10 LPG carriers and seven crude tankers. This assessment was compiled by the Directorate General of Shipping. On 25 March, a report indicated that three crude tankers owned by the Shipping Corporation of India, including a VLCC and an Aframax, are heading towards India from the west of Hormuz. One of the vessels include Desh Vaibhav with a deadweight tonnage of 316,200 tonnes. Transponder signals identify the ships as "GOVT. OF INDIA SHIP".

A report by The Times of India on 26 March, citing "sources in the defence establishments", indicated that the Indian Navy deployed over five frontline warships in the region under Operation Urja Suraksha. There were 20 more Indian ships to the west of the Strait of Hormuz. The Indian Navy keeps in contact with the India-bound vessels that are preparing to leave the Persian Gulf. Officials in DG Shipping also said that the Indian destroyers and frigates would escort and guide an India-bound vessel out of the troubled waters from the Gulf of Oman with a layered security arrangement, after it clears the Strait with Iranian consent. An independent analyst assessed that Iran allows a vessel to leave the region following a "verification" which is conducted during "the ships’ transit inside Iranian waters". Reports also indicate the deployment of large numbers of sea mines in the region and that the warships are also guiding the cargo vessels to navigate through the designated safe routes.

LPG carriers Jag Vasant and Pine Gas were the first to escape the conflict zone with escorts under the operation. Reports also indicate the deployment of large numbers of sea mines in the region and that the warships are also guiding the cargo vessels to navigate through the designated safe routes. The Iranian Navy had guided the earlier Indian vessels that were allowed to cross the region.

Ship(s) transitting	Crew	Ownership	Port of departure	Port of arrival	Ref
Ship(s) transitting	Crew	Payload	Date of crossing the strait	Date of arrival	Ref
Details
Jag Vasant (India) Pine Gas (India)	33 sailors 27 sailors	Great Eastern Shipping	Kuwait City (United Arab Emirates) Ruwais refinery	(India) Kandla Port (India) Dhamra Port	
Jag Vasant (India) Pine Gas (India)	33 sailors 27 sailors	Liquified Petroleum Gas (47,600 tonnes) Liquified Petroleum Gas (47,000 tonnes)	23 March	26 March 2 April	
On 23 March, LPG carriers Jag Vasant and Pine Gas started sailing northwards from the UAE coast towards Iran's Qeshm and Larak Islands according to LSEG ship-tracking data. They travelled through the coastal waters of Iran, a route followed by other ships which were allowed to sail through the Strait. Their Indian ownership was conveyed by their transponders which, however, did not transmit their destination. While the transit takes around 14 hours without hindrance, the ships were expected to cross the strait by evening. Both the vessels entered the Persian Gulf on 26 February and filled LPG from Kuwait and Ruwais, UAE, respectively. They were carrying 92,612.59 tonnes of LPG combined and will reach the Indian ports between 26 and 28 March, respectively. While Jag Vasant carrying 47,600 tonnes of LPG will reach the Kandla Port on 26 March, Pine Gas is carrying 45,000 tonnes of LPG to the New Mangalore Port and is scheduled to reach the port on 27 March. However, by 2 April, Pine Gas was reloaded up to 47,000 tonnes of LPG mid-sea and had been rerouted to the Visakhapatnam Port and was expected to dock in the port by early morning of 2 April. The original destination of the ship was New Mangalore Port but was rescheduled to reach Dhamra Port, Odisha on 1 April, followed by Visakapatnam the next day.

There were five more LPG carriers to the west of Hormuz according to Reuters. Further 11 sailors onboard Indian vessels to the west of Hormuz have returned home which further brings down the number of Indian sailors to 540. India also started loading LPG into empty vessels that were stranded in the Persian Gulf,indicating possible sailing back to Indian shores.

=== 26 March–1 April ===
On 28 March, two additional LPG carriers, BW Elm and BW Tyr, reached the eastern part of the Strait according to shipping data from LSEG and Kpler. The destinations of the ships were Mumbai Port and New Mangalore Port. This kept three more LPG tankers — Jag Vikram, Green Asha and Green Sanvi — among the 18 Indian ships in the western part of the Strait.

Ship(s) transitting	Crew	Ownership	Port of departure	Port of arrival	Ref
Ship(s) transitting	Crew	Payload	Date of crossing the strait	Date of arrival	Ref
Details
BW Elm (India) BW Tyr (India)	28 sailors 27 sailors	BW Global	(United Arab Emirates) Ras Al Khaima	(India) Mumbai Port (India) New Mangalore Port	
BW Elm (India) BW Tyr (India)	28 sailors 27 sailors	Propane, Butane	28 March	1 April 31 March	
On 28 March, two additional LPG carriers, BW Elm and BW Tyr, reached the eastern part of the Strait according to shipping data from LSEG and Kpler. The destinations of the ships were Mumbai Port and New Mangalore Port. This kept three more LPG tankers — Jag Vikram, Green Asha and Green Sanvi — among the 18 Indian ships in the western part of the Strait. BW Elm's cargo of 23,860 tonnes of propane and 23,139 tonnes of butane is meant for Hindustan Petroleum Corporation Limited. BW Elm is to reach Mumbai on 1 April. Meanwhile, BW Tyr's cargo 23,653 tonnes of propane and 22,926 tonnes of butane for Bharat Petroleum Corporation Limited. BW Tyr reached Mumbai prior to Mangalore on 31 March.
Green Sanvi (India)	25 sailors	MOL India	Al Rams	(India) Vadinar Refinery	
Green Sanvi (India)	25 sailors	Liquified Petroleum Gas (46,650 tonnes)	3 April	7 April	
On 3 April, ship tracking data from Kpler and reports indicated that Very Large Gas Carrier (VLGC) Green Sanvi with 46,650 MT tonnes of LPG is heading towards India after crossing the strait.

On 30 March, the Indian government noted that in addition to 18 Indian-flagged vessels to the west of the strait, there were ten foreign-flagged energy carriying vessels in the region with their destinations in India. Among the ten foreign-flagged vessels, three were carrying LPG and LNG each while four are loaded with crude oil.

=== 1–7 April ===
As per Mukesh Mangal, Additional Secretary at the shipping ministry on 6 April, the 16 Indian vessels in the Persian Gulf included two LPG tankers (Jag Vikram and Green Asha; one empty), six crude oil tankers (one empty), one LNG tanker, one chemical products tanker, three container ships, two bulk carriers and a dredging vessel. Further, Green Sanvi and Green Asha have 25 and 26 sailors, and 46,650 tonnes and 15,405 tonnes of LPG on board, respectively. They will reach Indian ports on 7 and 9 April, respectively. The Indian Directorate General of Shipping issued a new advisory for Indian seafarers near Iran urging them stay onboard their ships and limit unnecessary shore travel while staying in continuous contact with their company representatives and both Indian and Iranian authorities.

Ship(s) transitting	Crew	Ownership	Port of departure	Port of arrival	Ref
Ship(s) transitting	Crew	Payload	Date of crossing the strait	Date of arrival	Ref
Details
Green Asha (India)	26 sailors	MOL India	(United Arab Emirates) Al Rams	(India) Jawaharlal Nehru Port	
Green Asha (India)	26 sailors	Liquified Petroleum Gas (15,405 tonnes)	6 April (1530 hours IST)	9 April	
Green Asha is a Mid-sized gas carrier that became the eighth Indian ship to exit the Persian Gulf since 28 February. The vessel was likely to head towards Dahej port in Gujarat. However the ship would later dock at Jawaharlal Nehru port in Navi Mumbai on 9 April with a cargo of LPG for BPCL and Indian Oil.
Jag Vikram (India)	24 sailors	Great Eastern Shipping	(United Arab Emirates) Al Rams	(India) Kandla Port	
Jag Vikram (India)	24 sailors	Liquified Petroleum Gas (20,400 tonnes)	10-11 April	14 April	
Jag Vikram, a mid-sized gas carrier, became the First ship to cross the strait following the 2026 Iran war ceasefire. This leaves 15 other India flagged ships still located within the region. The Ship had been awaiting permission to cross the strait since April 3. The Ship was initially heading to Mumbai, but later arrived at Kandla port in Gujarat.

Additionally, India was to receive its first cargo of oil from Iran, from where purchases of crude oil had stopped in 2019 due to US sanctions and a deteriorating relationship. Indian Oil purchased the cargo currently aboard the Curaçao-flagged VLCC Jaya and Jordan, have signalled India as their discharge location. India also started granting cargo waivers to older tankers such as the Iranian-flagged Aurora that were bringing in fuel supplies from Iran and docked to Mangalore Port on 9 April 2026. These tankers are currently under sanctions from the United States government. India also categorically rejected paying tolls for its vessels to cross the strait.

=== 8–15 April ===
As reported on 11 April the Indian Navy and the multi-ministry task force is preparing to rescue 18 India-bound ships in the region. These include four LPG carriers, three LNG carriers and 11 crude oil tankers. Further, 5 of these are Indian-flagged vessels while the others are leased by Indian companies. There are 15 Indian-linked vessels in the Persian Gulf, three each in the Gulf of Oman and the Gulf of Aden and two in the Red Sea. In a media query the Representative of Iran's Supreme Leader in India, Dr Abdul Majid Hakeem Ilah replied that the situation was not improving and that fewer ships would be allowed to pass through the strait. The Iranian ambassador to India, Mohammad Fathali confirmed that Iran would not be imposing any tariffs on oil being exported to India, citing good ties with the nation. Shell also increased supplies to India, following a fall in ships arriving from QatarEnergy.

Ship(s) transitting	Crew	Ownership	Port of departure	Port of arrival	Ref
Ship(s) transitting	Crew	Payload	Date of crossing the strait	Date of arrival	Ref
Details
Jag Vikram (India)	24 sailors	Great Eastern Shipping	(United Arab Emirates) Al Rams	(India) Kandla Port	
Jag Vikram (India)	24 sailors	Liquified Petroleum Gas (20,400 tonnes)	10-11 April	14 April	
Jag Vikram, a mid-sized gas carrier, became the First ship to cross the strait following the 2026 Iran war ceasefire. This leaves 15 other India flagged ships still located within the region. The Ship had been awaiting permission to cross the strait since April 3. The ship was initially heading to Mumbai, but later arrived at Kandla port in Gujarat. The arrival of the ship preceded the US Navy's maritime blockade of Iran and prior to the expiration of a crucial 1-month waiver for Indian Importers.

In addition to Indian ships, the Iranian flagged tanker Felicity anchored off the coast of Sikka in Gujarat on April 12. The tanker is operated by the National Iranian Tanker Company and is laden with 2 million barrels of Iranian oil for Reliance Industries and was estimated to have lifted oil from Kharg Island sometime in the middle of March. India was also allotted a one-month waiver by the USA on sale of Iranian oil already in tankers on the water in a bid to ease the supply disruption within the nation until April 19. The VLCC tankers Jaya and Jordan also reached Paradip on India's east coast, carrying fuel for IOC. The ships are estimated to have been loaded late February, just prior to the US-Israeli strikes. Reliance was also reported to have bought oil using the Comoros-flagged aframax ship Kaviz and Curaçao-flagged VLCC Lenore, and a rare government permission has been granted to Iran-flagged VLCCs Felicity and Hedy to sail towards India. The Hedy has been positioned near Chabahar port since April 1.The Kaviz had exited the Gulf on 9 April, while the Lenore loaded crude from Iran's Kharg Island on March 20. India was reported to have purchased Iranian oil using Chinese Yuan and these transactions were facilitated by the ICICI Bank. India considers these purchases as a one-time only transaction to meet the energy demands of the country.

=== 16–30th April ===
The Union Cabinet, chaired by Prime Minister Narendra Modi, approved the launch of a new insurance scheme for stranded Indian commercial shipping in West Asia. Dubbed the ‘Bharat Maritime Insurance Pool' with a national guarantee up to ₹12,980 crore (US$1.3 billion), It aims to facilitate continuous maritime insurance coverages related to a ship's hull and machinery, cargo, P&I as well as War risk, with underwriting charges of up to ₹950 crore (US$99 million) for a period of ten years, extendable up to fifteen. The programme covers both vessels carrying cargo from any international port to an Indian ports and vice versa. The Indian government also sanctioned a committee to oversee the formation and functioning of the BMI pool. The initiative was announced by Ashwini Vaisnav during a media briefing of the situation.

Ship(s) transitting	Ownership	Port of departure	Port of arrival	Ref
Ship(s) transitting	Payload	Date of crossing the strait	Date of arrival	Ref
Details
Desh Garima (India)	Shipping Corporation of India	(Qatar) Ras Laffan	(India) Mumbai Port	
Desh Garima (India)	Crude oil (96,400 tonnes)	17 April	22 April	
Following a temporary lifting of Iranian barriers on the strait of Hormouz on April 18, the crude oil tanker Desh Garima was one among the eight tankers to depart from Qatar and the 10th ship overall to be evacuated towards India. The ship took an irregular route, taking it near Omani waters. The ship arrived in Mumbai 5 days later. 13 Indian flaggd and an Indian destined vessel remain in the strait.

An Iranian-flagged VLCC ship named Dorena was also spotted near the southern India's coastline and it is also expcted to discharge its cargo of crude oil to the country. The ship constitutes the third batch of Iranian oil received by India in the past three months. Iran however had reimposed the blockades soon after lifting them, resulting in four Indian tankers and two Greek-flagged vessels turning back after attempting to cross the strait on 18 April. The tankers have been identified as the private Sanmar Herald as well as the SCI-owned Desh Vaibhav and Desh Vibhor as well as the Greek Nissos Keros and Minerva Evrop that were heading towards Indian ports, cumulatively carrying close to 8.3 million barrels of Oil. The ships were warned by the Iranian navy not to cross the strait the day before. India also supplied Bangladesh with about 35,000 tonnes of refined diesel fuel via the India-Bangladesh Friendship Pipeline from India's Parbatipur Padma Oil depot and Numaligarh Refinery Limited during the period between early-March and mid-April.

=== May ===
Forty-one India-bound vessels containing LPG,LNG, Fertilisers and other cargo remain in the Persian Gulf. Following the US imposed blockade of Iraninan ports, The first Indian ship to approach the Strait from the east side, the Umm Al Astan departed from Dahej to cross the strait on 1 May. The ship will make its way to Das Island in the UAE to take up a supply of LNG. The ship was reached Kor Fakkan a day later.

Marshall Islands-flagged and Indian crewed Sarv Shakti , under charter for Indian Oil Corporation began transit to cross the Strait on 2 March 2026. The ship sailed past the Larak and Queshm islands and was heading into the Gulf of Oman. The ship successfully crossed, loaded with 46,313 of LPG with a crew of 20 on board, including 18 Indians. The ship is expected to reach Visakhapatnam on May 13, 2026.

On 12th May, another Indian vessel Tara Gas sailed from Sharjah with 53,208 MT of LPG. India also rejected offers to buy a new batch of sanctioned Russian LNG cargo. The next day, the tanker Symi sailed towards Kandla port with 20,000 tonnes of CNG from Qatar and reached India on 16th May. A Russian tanker, MT Unity was seized in Paradip after unloading Bunker Oil for IOCL, for non-payment of customs duties. The MV Sunshine also sailed into the Arabian sea on 15 May with a cargo of LPG, along with the tanker Karolus with Iraqi crude oil.

India also prioritised the recovery of the 13 more Indian flagged vessels stuck in the strait. Nissos Keros, a Marshall Islands-flagged crude oil tanker with 270,000 metric tonnes from Das refinery in the UAE also departed from the area on May 25th and was expected to arrive in Visakhapatnam on June 3rd. The ship is carrying cargo for Hindustan Petroleum.

== Incidents ==
On 18 April 2026, report indicated that several merchant vessels had to turn back before crossing the Strait of Hormuz due to incidents of gunfire from gunboats of the IRGC Navy. Jag Arnav of the Great Eastern Shipping, carrying 2 million barrels of Iraqi crude oil and a bulk carrier heading to Al Jubail in Saudi Arabia, was also fired upon while another Indian tanker, Sanmar Herald, was in the vicinity which was not targeted. Both the ships return to the Persian Gulf with both the crew and veles reportedly safe. Amidst the firing incident, the crew from Sanmar Herald reported that they had also encountered the firing incident and were turning back. India also summoned the Iranian envoy after the Incident. Meanwhile, the Indian Navy has two destroyers, a frigate and a tanker deployed to the east of the choke point and the force is trying to ascertain details of the incident. Reuters reported at least two tankers being targeted including the that of the Indian tanker and a report by the UK Maritime Trade Operations. The Indian Navy issued an advisory urging seafarers to avoid escalation and steer clear of Iran's Larak Islands.

On 22 April, the IRGC had seized two vessels and directed them to Iranian ports. One of the ships, the Liberian-flagged Epaminondas was fired upon and interned by Iran. The ship was heading with cargo to Gujarat's Mundra Port. The Iran also fired warning shots at the Togo-flagged chemical tanker MT Chiron 7, and its crew of 17 Indian sailors off the coast of Shina, Oman on 27 April.

On 13 May, Indian-flagged cargo ship Haji Ali was struck by a projectile off the coast of Oman while sailing from Somalia to Sharjah, causing a fire. The vessel's 14 crew were rescued by the Omani Coast Guard. The ship, which was carrying livestock, lost stability and later sank. India's Ministry of External Affairs condemned the attack without identifying a perpetrator.

On 9th June, the Palau flagged vessel MT Marivex was disabled by USN forces after it was claimed that the ship had violated sanctions. and was hit by precision munitions fired from an F-18 hornet at the engine room of the ship. The Indian Crew were rescued by the Omani Navy. following a distress call. The ship had been previously sanctioned by the US. On 10th June 2026, The Palau flagged oil Tanker M/T Settebello, crewed by 24 Indian seafarers, was attacked by an USN helicopter with two Hellfire missiles. Three Indian Sailors were reported missing, later confirmed dead. The issue created a strong diplomatic tussle between India and the United States. Indian opposition leaders criticised Prime Minister Modi for maintaining silence over the deaths of Indian sailors. The ship was reported to have not been transitting, and had been sitting at its position for over 10-days prior. A third ship, Guinea-Bissau-flagged MT Jalveer also come under attack in the vicinity of Shinas port in Oman .Most of the crew were Indian nationals who were evacuated by the Royal Navy of Oman. US President Donald Trump counter claimed that the strikes were carried out by Iranian Drones, which was rejected by Iran and India.

== Analysis ==
An Informal group of government ministers who coordinated the operation led by Indian Defence Minister, Rajnath Singh, informed media sources that India had evacuated the highest number of vessels than any other country from the Strait of Hormuz during the course of Operation Urja Suraksha. The vessels had collectively managed to bring close to 340 tonnes of fuel, sustaining 11 days of India's import requirements of petrol, diesel and fertilizers. Domestic production was also ramped up by forty-percent to meet the shortfall, enabling continuous food and energy security for India. A large majority of the imports had been prioritised for the pharma, agricultural, polymers, paints, metallurgical, and food processing sectors to prevent supply chain disruptions, though some private sector companies have been reported to have faced challenges for procurement.

The Indian Ministry for External Affairs welcomed the initial U.S.–Iran ceasefire agreement and called for an early end to the conflict for “unimpeded” trade flow through the Strait of Hormuz. Foreign Ministry Spokesperson Randhir Jaiswal maintained that no discussions had taken place on the issue or Iran imposing tolls at the Strait of Hormuz and called for free and safe navigation. The Indian Minister for Petroleum and Natural Gas Hardeep Singh Puri visited Qatar and India's External Affairs Minister Dr S Jaishankar visited the United Arab Emirates to negotiate on the future security of oil supplies to India. India has also reacted negatively to Iranian demands to collect tolls after the cease in hostilities in early April 2026.

In addition, Indian sailors who were imprisoned in Iran prior to the conflict on allegations of Fuel smuggling by the IRGC were released to Armenia on 27 March. Indian sailors in Basra also evacuated themselves from the coflict zone. During the course of the Operation, the Indian Navy escorted over ₹16,000 crore worth of cargo in multiple phases.

Representatives from the Indian Government attended a UK-hosted meeting on International trade and protection in the strait of Hormuz. Randhir Jaiswal, representative of the Indian Ministry for External Affairs confirmed that India was also invited to join a Franco-British Initiative to conduct peaceful escort of ships in the Arabian sea and Persian Gulf by the two countries of 17 April 2026. Defence Minister Rajnath Singh also refused to rule out any possibility that India would not participate in the diplomatic efforts. The Indian Navy also designated Hormuz as a primary area of concern after renewed blockade in the area.

== See also ==
- India in the 2026 Iran war
- 2026 Iran war regional mobilizations
- Operation Sankalp
- Operation Muhafiz-ul-Bahr
- 1979 oil crisis
