= Kandla Port =

Port in Gujarat, India

Kandla Port કંડલા બંદર
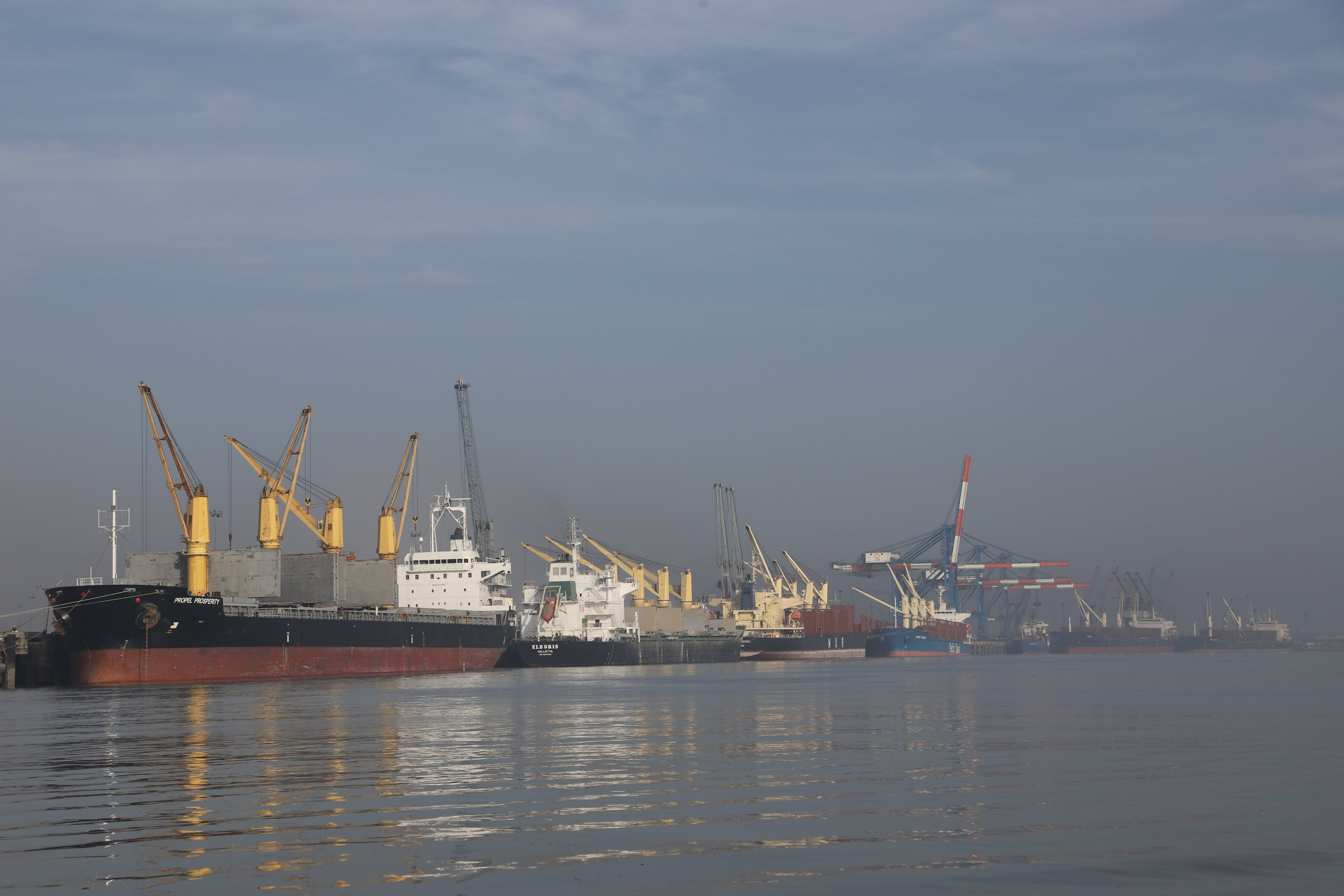
- Kandla Port
- Interactive map of Kandla Port કંડલા બંદર

Location
- Country: India
- Location: Kandla, Gujarat, India
- Coordinates: 23.000271°N 70.2208838°E

Details
- Opened: 1952
- Operated by: Deendayal Port Authority
- Owned by: Deendayal Port Authority, Ministry of Ports, Shipping and Waterways, Government of India
- Type of Harbor: All weather tidal port
- Draft depth: 13 metres (43 ft)
- Length of approach channel: 27 kilometres (17 mi)
- Official name: Deendayal Port Authority

Statistics
- Annual container volume: 132.3 million tonnes (2023-2024)
- Website www.deendayalport.gov.in

Kandla Port, officially known as Deendayal Port, is a seaport in the Kutch district of Gujarat, India. The port is situated in the Kandla Creek and is 90 km from the mouth of Gulf of Kutch.It is one of India’s major ports on the west coast. The port is about 256 nautical miles southeast of the Port of Karachi in Pakistan and about 430 nautical miles north-northwest of the Port of Mumbai. Kandla Port was constructed in the 1950s as the chief seaport serving western India.

The depth of the port channel depends on the tide. This channel has a minimum depth of 13 meters. It is the largest port of India by volume of cargo handled. Kandla Port was renamed as Deendayal Port in 2017 under the Indian Ports Act, 1908.

The Kandla Port is one of the ports that support the hinterland of North, West, and Central India. It mainly transports liquid and bulk cargoes and handled 132.3 million metric tonnes of cargo in the 2023–24 financial year.

== History and Location ==
Kandla was constructed in the 1950s as the chief seaport serving western India, after the independence of India. The Port of Deendayal is located on the Gulf of Kutch on the northwestern coast of India, some 256 nautical miles southeast of the Port of Karachi in Pakistan and over 430 nautical miles north-northwest of the Port of Mumbai (Bombay). The port infrastructure of the Deendayal Port Authority is located at three different locations along the Gulf of Kutch, which are Kandla Creek, Tuna Tekra and Vadinar. The port is located 90 miles (140 km) from the Gulf of Kutch estuary or the Arabian Sea.

The substrata of the port area consists of silty clay up to a depth of 10 metres (33 ft) below seabed, followed by hard silt up to 26 m; Dense sands are observed underneath the hard silt. Kandla has seasonal temperature variations; April and May are the warmest months, while December and January are the coldest months. The maximum temperature in May is 40°C and the minimum temperature in January is 12°C; the average daily maximum temperature is 34°C and the average daily minimum temperature is 20°C. Low rainfall is observed in Kandla. The port receives most of its seasonal rainfall from the southwest monsoon from June to September, with an average rainfall of 153 mm. April and May are the driest months, with average monthly rainfall below 0.6 mm. The average annual rainfall in this region is about 322 mm. Visibility in the harbor area is good throughout the year, and low visibility can usually be observed during rain and storms.

Kandla is a natural tidal harbour, completely protected from waves during monsoons season and connected to deep water by a dredged channel.

== Infrastructure ==
=== Kandla creek ===
==== Oil jetties ====
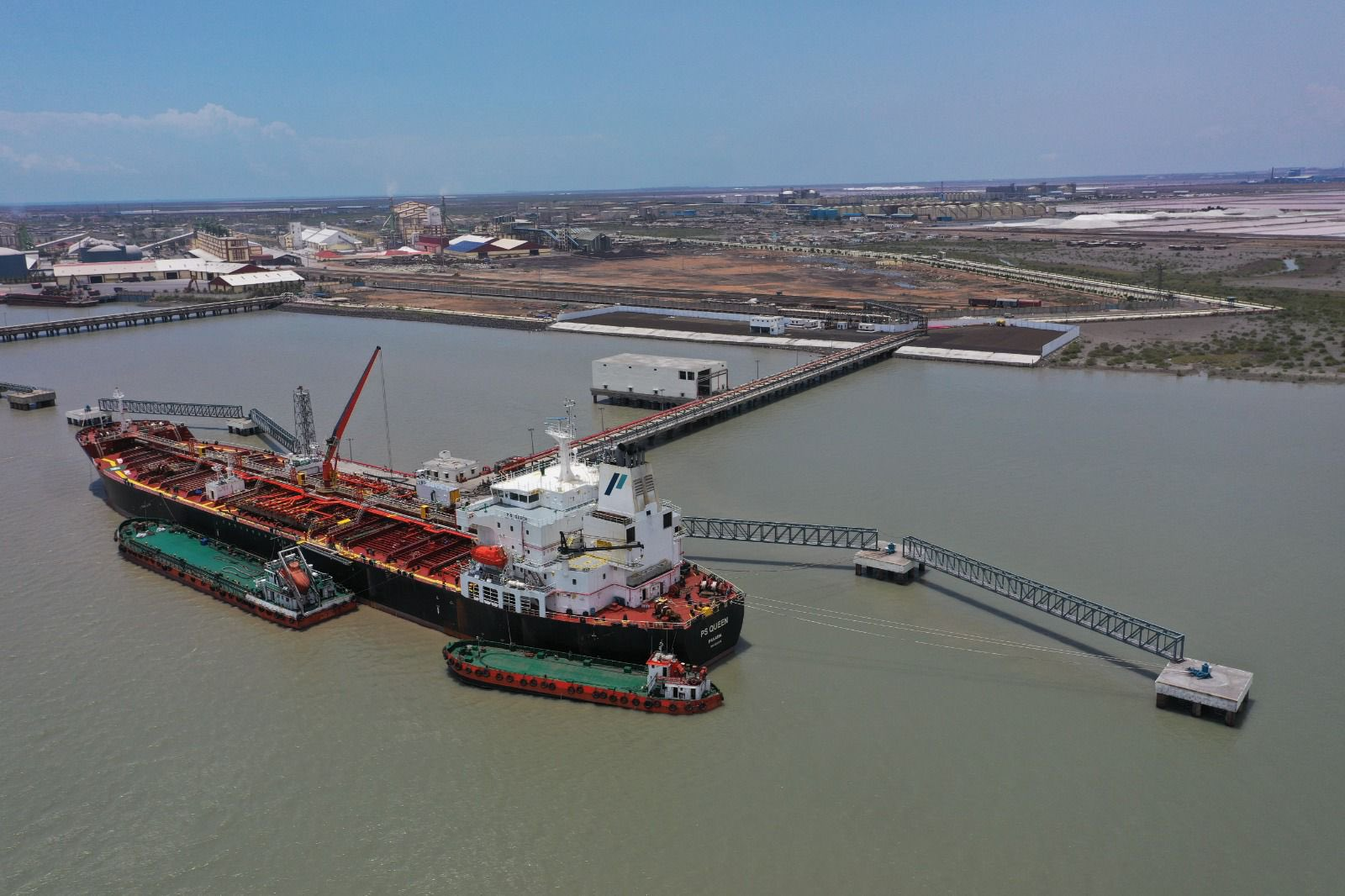
MT PS Queen berthed at oil jetty-07 with 12.30 metres (40.4 ft) draft, carrying 42,000 MT crude degummed soybean oil loaded in Ukraine.

Liquid products at the Kandala creek are mainly transported by seven oil jetties along the western bank of the creek. Each jetty consists of a service deck and a total of four dolphin moorings, two each on either side of the service deck. These jetties differ in the length of their service docks; oil jetty no-1 has the shortest length, which is 89.4 metres (293 ft) long, and jetties no-4, 5, 6, and 7 have the longest length, which are each 110 metres (360 ft) long. According to the construction design and infrastructure, the oil jetties are capable of handling oil tankers ranging from 40,000 DWT to 65,000 DWT. Among the oil jetties, oil jetty no-6 has the lowest navigability with a draft of 10.1 metres (33 ft) and oil jetty no-7 has the highest navigability with a draft of 13 metres (43 ft), while the length ranges of berth from a minimum of 183 metres (600 ft) to a maximum of 216 metres (709 ft).

Oil jetty no-1 to no-7 are each capable of handling two million tonnes of liquid products. Oil jetty no-1 mainly handles LPG and chemicals, oil jetty no-2, 3 and 4 each handle chemicals, oil jetty no-5 carries gas/chemicals, oil jetty no-6 handles petroleum products and oil jetty no-7 mainly handles edible oil.

Information about jetties
Berth Name (No. of Berths)	Length (m)	Draft (m)	Capacity (MTPA)	Vessel size (DWT)	Cargo Handled
OJ-1	213.40	10.40	2.00	40,000	POL products, Veg. Oil and Others Liquids
OJ-2	183.00	9.00	2.00	52,000	POL products, Veg. Oil and Others Liquids
OJ-3	213.40	9.80	2.00	40,000	POL products, Veg. Oil and Others Liquids
OJ-4	216.00	10.70	2.00	56,000	POL products, Veg. Oil and Others Liquids
OJ-5	216.00	10.70	2.00	45,000	Phos/Ammonia
OJ-6	216.00	10.10	2.00	45,000	POL Products
OJ-7		13.00	2.00	65,000	Veg. Oil
OJ-8 (under construction)			3.50	85,000	Veg. Oil

==== Cargo berths ====
Cargo berths mainly handle bulk cargoes and containers. There are a total of 16 berths, of which two are container berths and others are bulk cargo berths. The maximum draft at the terminal is 14.5 metres, providing berthing capacity for vessels up to 255 meters in length.

=== Vadinar ===
==== Off-shore Oil Terminal ====
The off-shore oil terminal consists of three single buoy moorings (SBM), these buoys have a navigable depth of 33 metres (108 ft). The SBMs are known as SBM-1, SBM-2 and SBM-3. SBM-1 and SBM-2 have an annual oil handling capacity of 11.25 million tonnes, while SBM-3 has an annual oil handling capacity of 19.95 million tonnes. The terminal has infrastructure to handle large oil tankers, and its buoys are capable of accommodating vessels up to 300,000 DWT. Buoy moorings at this terminal unload crude oil for the refineries at Koyali (Gujarat), Mathura (Uttar Pradesh), Panipat (Haryana) and Essar Oil Refineries. The terminal has crude oil storage facilities; the storage facilities operated by IOCL and EOL have a capacity of 11,44,000 kilolitres and 11,20,000 kilolitres respectively. Buoy moorings are connected through pipelines to onshore storage tanks, and to the main pipelines to oil refineries in North India and Gujarat.

==== Product Jetty ====
There are two product jetties on the coast of Vadinar, which handle POL (Petroleum, Oil, and Lubricants) products. Each jetty is capable of handling 7.25 million tonnes of product annually.

== Traffic handled ==
The west coast port handled 7.223 crore (72.225 million) tonnes of cargo in 2008–09, over 11% more than the 6.492 crore (64.920 million) tonnes handled in 2007–08. Even as much of the growth of Deendayal Port Authority(DPA) has come from handling of crude oil imports in Vadinar Port, mainly for Nayara Energy's Vadinar refinery in Gujarat, the port is also taking measures to boost non-POL cargo. Last fiscal, POL traffic accounted for 63 per cent of the total cargo handled at Kandla Port, as against 59% in 2007–08. In 2015-16 the port handled 10.6 crore (106 million) tonnes of cargo.

In 2008–09, total port traffic grew by 13.6% to reach an all-time high of 7.22 crore (72.22 million) tonnes. The port's share in traffic handled by all major ports has risen steadily over the years, peaking at 13.6% in 2008-09 (see table). Earlier projections made by the port indicate an annual capacity handling target of 10 crore (100 million) tonnes per annum by 2012.

Year	Mln tons	Change* %	Share** %
2003–04	41,523	2.2	12.0
2004–05	41,551	0.1	10.8
2005–06	45,907	10.5	10.8
2006–07	52,982	15.4	11.4
2007–08	64,920	22.5	12.5
2008–09	72,225	11.3	13.6
* With respect to previous year.** Share of traffic compared to all major Indian ports.

== Bibliography ==
- AECOM (21 July 2016). Master plan for Kandla port (PDF) (Report). Kandla Port Trust.
