= Essar Salaya Power Plant =

Thermal power plant in Vadinar, Gujarat, India

Essar Salaya Power Plant is a coal-based thermal power plant located near the Essar Refinery at Vadinar, in the Jamnagar district in the Indian state of Gujarat. The power plant is operated by Essar Energy.

The coal for the plant will be sourced from captive mine owned by Essar Energy in Indonesia.

== Capacity ==
It has an installed capacity of 1200 MW (2×600 MW).

Unit No.	Generating Capacity	Commissioned on	Status
1	600 MW	2012 April	Running
2	600 MW	2012 June	Running
