= Essar Vadinar Power Plant =

Thermal power plant in Vadinar, Gujarat, India

Vadinar Power Company Ltd is a coal/gas based captive thermal power plant located inside Essar Refinery at Vadinar, in Jamnagar district in the Indian state of Gujarat. It is a subsidiary of Essar Oil.

== Capacity ==
It has an installed capacity of 612 MW (3 x 105 MW, 2 x 110 MW, 2 x3 8.6 MW). The plant is fully functional.
