= 2026 Iran war regional mobilizations =

During the 2026 Iran war, amidst joint US-Israel strikes on Iran, Iranian strikes against American and Israeli assets across the region, and the economic impact of the conflict, several surrounding nations began military mobilizations to secure their borders and maritime trade across the Arabian Sea, Red Sea and the Eastern Mediterranean, among others.

== Western Bloc ==
Many Western countries have deployed ships to the Gulf of Oman with the goal of ensuring maritime security in the Strait of Hormuz, also serving as observers in the 2026 Iran war. France deployed the aircraft carrier Charles de Gaulle to defend Cyprus, with the intention of protecting French citizens affected by the regional instability, and to prevent a broader regional conflict that could threaten energy supplies to Europe. The United Kingdom deployed forces to reinforce its Overseas military bases in the Persian Gulf, while blocking US access to them for aggressive purposes. The Netherlands expressed interest in potentially joining the French and British mobilization in the Strait of Hormuz. Reports by Israeli sources suggest that Germany is planning for a possible military deployment in the Persian Gulf against Iran. Italy deployed naval vessels and air defense systems (potentially including SAMP/T batteries) to help protect the Gulf region against Iranian airstrikes, and also to protect Italian personnel and regional energy supply, while refusing to participate in offensive actions in support of the US and Israel against Iran. Ukraine has sent drone warfare specialists to US bases in Jordan, Saudi Arabia, the UAE, and Qatar to help counter Iranian Shahed drones. The Australian Government pledged to not send any ground troops to Iran and said that Australia would only take purely defensive action. Australia deployed forces to the United Arab Emirates (UAE) to defend the Gulf states and Australian military bases at the request of the UAE.

The European Council and the Gulf Cooperation Council made a joint declaration to mobilize forces with the intention to "work together on de-escalation, safeguarding regional security and respect for international law". France formed their own plans to assemble a multinational force (including Non-EU states) on a "purely defensive, purely support" mission to secure freedom of navigation in the Middle East and allow commercial vessels to continue transit through the Strait of Hormuz and the Gulf of Oman. Similar projects for multilateral mobilization have been planned by Italy. Iran warned NATO and the European Union against military activities in support of the US and Israel.

Regarding US efforts to re-open the Strait of Hormuz with the aid of NATO and other US allies, the United Kingdom and France have backed coordinated action to restore shipping without supporting US and Israeli attacks on Iran, while Spain, Greece, and Japan have ruled out military intervention. On March 19, France, Germany, Italy, Japan, Netherlands and United Kingdom declared their support to contribute in the efforts to open the Strait of Hormuz. Also did the European Union.

On 11 April, US Navy destroyers crossed the Strait of Hormuz, as they were challenged by IRGC naval forces. The incident was reportedly intended to show that the US will not recognize Iranian control of the Strait.

== Eastern Mediterranean ==
=== In Cyprus and the Balkans ===
==== European Union and Britain ====
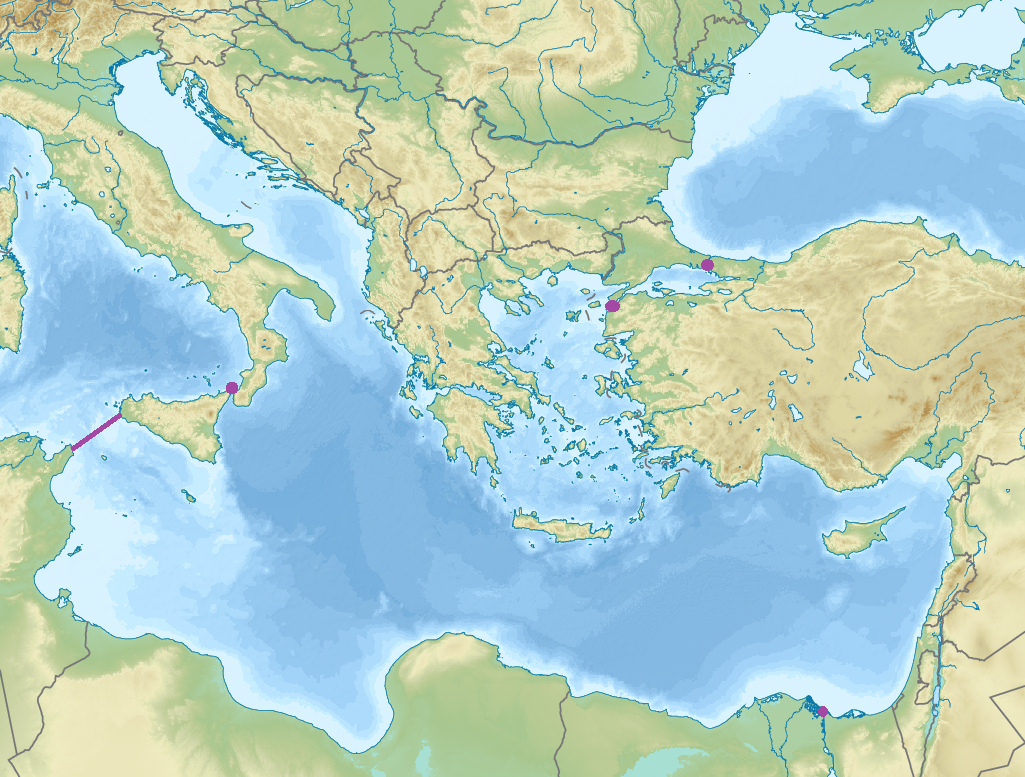
Eastern Mediterranean, main region of European mobilization through the territory of Cyprus, Lebanon, Turkey, Greece, Bulgaria

Following strikes on the island of Cyprus and the threats of the IRGC against the island, numerous nations—including France, Germany, Greece, Italy, Spain, the Netherlands and the United Kingdom—decided to mobilize their armed forces in the surrounding waters and onto the island, vowing to protect it in case of an attack. The European Commission Chief Spokesperson Paula Pinho stated that in the coming days following the attack, the EU "mutual defence clause will be up for discussion". On 6 March, Bulgaria allowed the United States and Greece to use its territory to counter potential Iranian attacks. The president of the European People's Party (EPP), Manfred Weber, called Iran a "criminal regime" and vowed that an attack on the Republic of Cyprus would be considered an attack on Europe. On 2 March, Emmanuel Macron (President of France) announced that simultaneous mobilizations were being conducted, which will include the temporary deployment of its nuclear-armed aircraft to 8 European countries (Germany, Britain, Poland, the Netherlands, Belgium, Greece, Sweden and Denmark) to bolster the security of the continent against spillovers from the 2026 Iran War and the Russo-Ukrainian war.

Iran's response was to state that such acts of involvement in the conflict could be considered "acts of war"; however, analysts note that the European mobilization in Cyprus was not the reaction Iran expected and seems to have worked as a deterrent. Observers in the countries of Cyprus and Greece noted how the war was perceived pretty vividly and fears of further escalation involving both nations are prevalent. Cyprus expressed worries of possible terrorist cells that could act within the nation on Iran's behalf from Northern Cyprus, where 10,000 pro‑regime Iranians live and where, allegedly, Hamas and the Muslim Brotherhood operate.

Italy's intelligence agencies reported that it is highly possible that the entire Eastern Mediterranean region will be affected by the growing instability in the Levant and the Strait of Hormuz, mainly suffering impacts on energy markets and supply security, which will affect Mediterranean countries and Europe as a whole if the Indo-Mediterranean trade route through the Suez Canal-Red Sea is damaged by the conflict. Such geopolitical possibility of maritime insecurity was declared as the main reason for various Western countries to deploy troops, with the main goal of protecting the Euro-Atlantic trade routes. Italian Prime Minister Giorgia Meloni has been developing a rapprochement between the European Union and the Gulf Cooperation Council for a common diplomatic strategy and maintaining their neutrality while condemning Iranian attacks.

===== Opposition to aggressive actions =====
Despite the mobilizations, there was no unified European posture in the conflict, with political divisions between an energic support to the Anti-Iranian military activities (e.g., Germany) and the development of a defensive strategy accompanied by distancing from—and sometimes condemnation of (e.g., Spain)—US and Israeli activities perceived as legally dubious. Protests started in Cyprus against the existence of British Cyprus bases, as the Cyprus–United Kingdom relations worsened, due to Cypriots fearing that the country could be dragged into the Iranian conflict if the bases are used for pro-US/Israel offensive activities instead of their declared defensive purposes. Similarly the Government of Spain protested and hardened its position against a more active European intervention in the Middle Eastern crisis, which damaged the Spain–United States relations after Pedro Sánchez condemned US-Israel actions against Iran as a violation of International law, declaring such actions as a "big error" which only developed a conflict that is foreign to Europe and is dragging the Eastern Mediterranean to instability, while denying the use of Spanish bases to the US and Israel armies. Emmanuel Macron and the European Commission expressed solidarity with Spain against the threats of US economic coercion against European military independence. Germany and Belgium also declared their opposition to deploying forces in support for the US-Israel aggressions. The EU has officially been calling for de-escalation and to prefer diplomatic initiative with the help of the Gulf Countries, adjacent regions in Africa and the Indo-Pacific that are also affected by the War.

==== Turkey ====
Turkey also expressed its worries about the insecurity for Turkish Cypriots, planning to deploy air forces to North Cyprus with the mission of provide more security to Cyprus island and avoid merging the Cypriot Conflict with the Iranian War. Also the Greece–Turkey relations entered in tensions due to their conflicting interests as both countries have taken advantage of the Iranian menace to deploy their armies near the Greece–Turkey border and to secure positions to aid the conflictive Greek Cypriots and Turkish Cypriots, as also both countries protesting against the other military movements while being reluctant to cooperate as NATO partners (even being denounced by Greeks that the Turkish government is secretly helping Iranians during the 2026 Kurdish–Iranian crisis and also giving help to Hamas against Israel through North Cyprus).

=== In the Levant ===
==== Syria ====
By Wednesday 4 March, the Syrian Army (already mobilized in the region before the 2026 Iran War, due to the Spillover of the Gaza war by the Israeli invasion of Syria and the Iran-backed Assad loyalist insurgency) has bolstered its troop deployments on the country's borders with Lebanon and Iraq, as also for giving support to the Lebanese government in the Disarmament of Hezbollah.

"We have reinforced our defensive forces along the border as a precaution to prevent the repercussions of the conflict from spilling over onto Syrian territory, and to combat cross-border organizations and prevent them from using Syrian soil"

— Syrian President Ahmed al-Sharaa

==== European Union ====
At the start of the war, a projected 5 March International Conference in Paris to mobilize support to the Lebanese Armed Forces had been postponed. Despite, France mobilized forces in Southern Lebanon to aid in the peace process in the context of the Israeli–Lebanese conflict and redirect the efforts of the Lebanese government in the common goal of the Disarmament of Hezbollah, while also serving as a countermeasure to protect European interests against the non-agreed US-Israel military operations. The European Union itself on 10 March deployed emergency humanitarian aid for the civilian population harmed by the crossfire of the 2026 Lebanon war and its large scale displacements, with the help of the World Food Programme (WFP) and UNICEF. A day before, during the announcement of the mobilisation, the EU stated its desire for the respect of the sovereignty and territorial integrity of Lebanon by Iran-backed Hezbollah and Israel. Lebanon urged to European allies of Israel to send military aid for the stabilization of the region.

==== United Nations ====
Since 2006, the United Nations Interim Force in Lebanon has been mobilized at the Israel Lebanon border as a peacekeeping force, aiming to support the Lebanese army's operations against Iran's sponsored terrorism by Hezbollah insurgencies, and to secure the Israeli withdrawal from Lebanon. Although UNIFIL's operations are scheduled to end on 31 December 2026, countries like Spain have declared that they will maintain their presence in the region in support of the Lebanese government and the Lebanese Armed Forces until conditions allow, given the escalating crossfire between Israel and Iran backed Hezbollah. Currently, UN forces have had to reinforce security measures to the maximum and remain "bunked" for most of the day to avoid being hit at the 2026 Lebanon war. Despite, recently have been proposals for an evacuation of the UNIFIL, with help of the European mobilized forces in Cyprus, due to the intensification of the hostilities in the region and the fears of institutional collapse in Lebanon.

== Red Sea and Gulf of Aden ==
=== Houthi Yemen ===
The militarization of the Houthis (already engaged in the Yemeni civil war) has intensified as the Axis of Resistance links the Iran war to their ongoing Red Sea blockade by Israel, threatening to resume their shipping attacks if tensions escalate, while focusing to mobilize its forces to defeat the pro-US/Israel Saudi-led intervention in Yemen (not wanting to violate the 2025 United States–Houthi ceasefire).

By March 2026, has been reported new mobilizations by the Saudi-backed Presidential Leadership Council to repress the remnants of the UAE-backed Southern Transitional Council (dissolved after the 2025–2026 Southern Yemen campaign) for the total stabilization of Aden, being accelerated such mobilizations for unifying the security and military apparatus under Yemen Republic's command due to the menace of the increased tensions with the Iran-backed Supreme Political Council after the 2026 Iran War and the risks of being broken the Iranian-Saudi normalization. In that context of increased tensions in Yemen, the neutral commercial vessels from Afro-Eurasia have been avoiding the Bab al-Mandab Strait and the Suez Canal Indo-Mediterranean route in preference to the Cape of Good Hope one to reach the Indian Ocean trade.

In reaction to the Houthi threat, some Western countries like France announced the deployment of forces in the Red Sea to secure the trade routes in the region from potential spillovers of the 2026 Iran War.

=== Egypt ===
Even before the 2026 US-Israel War on Iran, Egypt already mobilized tens of thousands of troops, tanks, armored vehicles, and combat helicopters to the northern Sinai Peninsula due to the Middle Eastern crisis (2023–present) and the risk of spillover of the Gaza war by the Hezbollah–Israel conflict (2023–present), desiring to avoid the expansion of the Iran–Israel proxy conflict in its territory. Also Egypt has heavily fortified the Israel-Egypt border with cement obstacles and buffer zones to physically block this, viewing any forced displacement of Palestinians as a direct threat to its national security and the 1979 peace treaty with Israel. Some of these mobilizations has been coordinated with Israel against the common menace of Shia Islamism backed by the Axis of Resistance, and also as independent deployments which has coldened its relations with Israel due to accusations of "excessive buildup".

Also the Egyptian government has been aggressively expanding its military footprint further south in the Horn of Africa, signing military cooperation agreements with Somalia to deploy troops there and secure the Bab el-Mandeb strait, countering the expanding Iranian/Houthi influence, and push back against Israel's recent controversial security maneuvers in the region (such as Israel's recognition of Somaliland). Also Egypt has been proposing the development of a neutral Pan-Arab force to counter the Iran–Israel proxy conflict spillovers in the Red Sea and avoid a dependence of the American-Israeli security umbrella, without success.

Map of Northeast Africa, in which most of the countries bordering the Red Sea started to deploy its forces

=== Northeast Africa ===
The Horn of Africa, alike North Africa, have been historically linked to the Middle East due to the existence of military, political and economic networks across the Gulf of Aden and Red Sea interactions (provoking that a crisis on one shore to quickly affect the other). Due to this, the Axis of Resistance have expanded its Sphere of influence in the region even before the US-Israel War, as also did Saudi Arabia, the UAE and Israel to secure their interests (in the context of the Iran–Saudi Arabia proxy war). The Iranian vessel Saviz is deployed at the Red Sea (close to the Eritrean coast) from Houthi Yemen as a logistical and intelligence platform low-cost tools, alongside military advisers and arms networks to transport weaponry, as also have been happening a tiny Iranian mobilization in Sudan and Eritrea since the 2000s to secure its interests in the Strait of Mandab. Some analysts have showed serious preoccupations that the worst-case scenario for the 2026 Iran war would be an expansion of the conflict towards Northeast Africa due to the related Red Sea crisis and the adjacent Horn of Africa conflict, in which could be merged the Sudanese civil war, the Eritrea–Ethiopia crisis, the Ethiopia-Egypt and Sudan crisis, the Somali Civil War, the Sudanese civil war, among others (as also a rupture of Saudi Arabia with the UAE, and of Turkey and Egypt with Israel) due to the already mobilization of various countries as a consequence of regional tensions since before the war.

Some security sources claim that Houthis are considering to do incursions in the Arabian Sea and also use bases from the African side of the Red Sea, helped by their presence and some cells established in East Africa (including the involvement of the Al-Shabaab Islamic terrorist group, currently participating in the Somali Civil War). Those projected bases have been hinted as the Eritrean ports (mainly Assab, Massawa) and Somali ones, due to Iranian logistical access to Eritrean infrastructure and proxy relationships between Houthi and Somali militant networks. The Gulf states and Turkey also have been mobilizing towards Africa in case of increase of tensions with the Axis of Resistance, expecting a total militarization of the Red Sea corridor if the conflicts evolves to Total War.

Due to the Piracy in Somalia, a lot of countries have deployed forces in the Gulf of Aden, like the European Union in the Operation Atalanta, the US in the Operation Prosperity Guardian, among others. Recently the Spanish frigate Victoria withdraw from the region and was replaced by the Spanish frigate Canarias, as also has been considerations about ordering the escort vessel to remain further south, in Somali waters, to avoid becoming involved in military actions between the US and Iran in South Arabia coasts. The French frigate Forbin has been deployed at the Bab al-Mandab Strait.

==== Tensions in East Africa ====
It has been developed a Turkey–Saudi Arabia–Somalia militar bloc to counter the one of the UAE–Somaliland–Israel and also the Iran-Houthi-Al Shabaab (the last ones have also developed approachments to the Somali pirates). This current cold war in East Africa between Iran, Israel and Saudi Arabia also has been dragging Ethiopia (who seeks to maximize its strategic gains without signalling preference for either side) and Egypt (who have mobilized forces in Mogadishu to counter any competitive influence in the Red Sea). Geopolitical analysts like Mohamed Marshal have stated that "The Horn is no longer peripheral. It is tied to Gulf rivalries, Sudan’s war, Nile politics and global shipping routes. Ethiopia’s sea access discourse is part of that structural shift", while Abdel Latif El Menawy declared that "The growing overlap between African and Middle Eastern dynamics is reshaping the character of conflicts" and that Egypt is trying to develop an equilibrium in the region (considering to use military force if it's necessary). This Horn of Africa conflict is a consequence of the Indo-Mediterranean being increasingly congested with naval deployments, foreign bases, proxy competition, and infrastructure rivalries. Despite the Saudi-UAE rivalry in Africa, both states have made a temporarily Rapprochement due to being times of regional instability after the US-Israel War on Iran, not wanting dangerous power vacuums to emerge.

The Port of Berbera in Somaliland (an ally of Israel and of the United Arab Emirates, who both have a military presence in the area and already has mobilized there) and Camp Lemonnier in Djibouti (a US base in the country) has been considered military target by Iran and the Houthis (and its Al-Shabaab allies) due to its strategic importance. The Israel recognition of Somaliland included discussions of Israel establishing a military base in Berbera, with Houthis warning after the recognition that "Israeli assets in Somaliland would be legitimate military targets", risking regional stability in the Horn of Africa.

Ismaïl Omar Guelleh, president of Djibouti (ally of Saudi Arabia and Palestine), denounced that both Israel and United Arab Emirates are driving strategic realignments across Northeast Africa that risk intensifying current conflicts (like the Somali Civil War, Sudanese Civil War, Insurgency in Chad, Libyan crisis, etc.) and a possible merging of them with the Iran–Israel proxy conflict, justifying the neutrality of its country with the Houthis and also the mobilization of Djibouti Armed Forces in the Gulf of Aden with the goal of enhancing maritime security. Also the Prime Minister, Abdoulkader Kamil Mohamed, explicitly rejected in the past some US requests to conduct offensive operations against Houthi or Iranian targets from American facilities inside Djibouti, justifying his rejection for an US mobilization in the country with the goal of avoiding “to be drawn into a war”.

Moreover, Iran and the Houthis have reportedly increased diplomatic engagement with Ethiopia since the start of the war, as also the US with Egypt and Sudan, backing opposite sides in the current controversy of the Grand Ethiopian Renaissance Dam. However, also Israel has increased its diplomatic engagements with Ethiopia, expecting to take advantage of its landlocked situation to counter the Iran-Houthi sphere of influence in the coastal African Red Sea countries. On 10 March, Ethiopia engaged diplomatic talks with Israeli, Saudi and Kuwaiti diplomats concerning the regional insecurity and the risks of spillovers due to the increased mobilizations in the region as a consequence of the 2026 Iran War.

In Sudan, the Sudanese Armed Forces pronounced against declarations from the Al-Bara' ibn Malik Battalion (an Islamic extremist militia), which instigated the Sudanese Military to mobilize in support of Iran if it faced a ground invasion by the United States or Israel, warning with strict measures and legal action against groups with similar speeches. Also has been denounced that members of their militia were fighting alongside the Islamic Revolutionary Guard Corps due to the contacts established with the Muslim Brotherhood and Islamists in Sudan during the Iranian intervention in Sudan.

== Caucasus ==
=== Azerbaijan ===
Since 3 March, Azerbaijan's troops have already begun deploying toward the Iranian border as the conflict rages. This heightened military presence was justified in the fact that the Iran war severely escalates the risk of border skirmishes, especially if Iranian internal security collapses or if Israel uses Azerbaijani territory to launch attacks against Iran. However, foreign minister Jeyhun Bayramov said that "it is impossible for any country to use the territory of Azerbaijan against neighboring and friendly Iran".

Despite, the main preoccupation for the Azerbaijan Government to start mobilization has been the high risk of being merged the Armenia-Azerbaijan conflict with the Iran–Israel proxy conflict due to the informal existence of pro-US Azerbaijan–Israel and pro-Russia Armenia–Iran geo-strategic alliances (which also could affect the Georgian–Ossetian conflict due to Georgia–Russian complicated relations), as also the fear of an uprising by Azerbaijani separatists in Iran backed by the US and Israel that could destabilize the local Geopolitical calculations in the zone (currently based in the 2025 Armenia–Azerbaijan peace negotiations) and generate disrepute among the Azerbaijani irredentist sectors and the Liberals (who could align to a Westernized Iranian Azerbaijan Proto-state backed by US-Israel against the current Conservative Azerbaijan government). Azerbaijani fears have been increased by Iranian accusations that their territory have been used by Israeli Military personnel to harm Iran and to provide strategical resources for Israel's War economy.

==== Tensions in the Caucasus ====
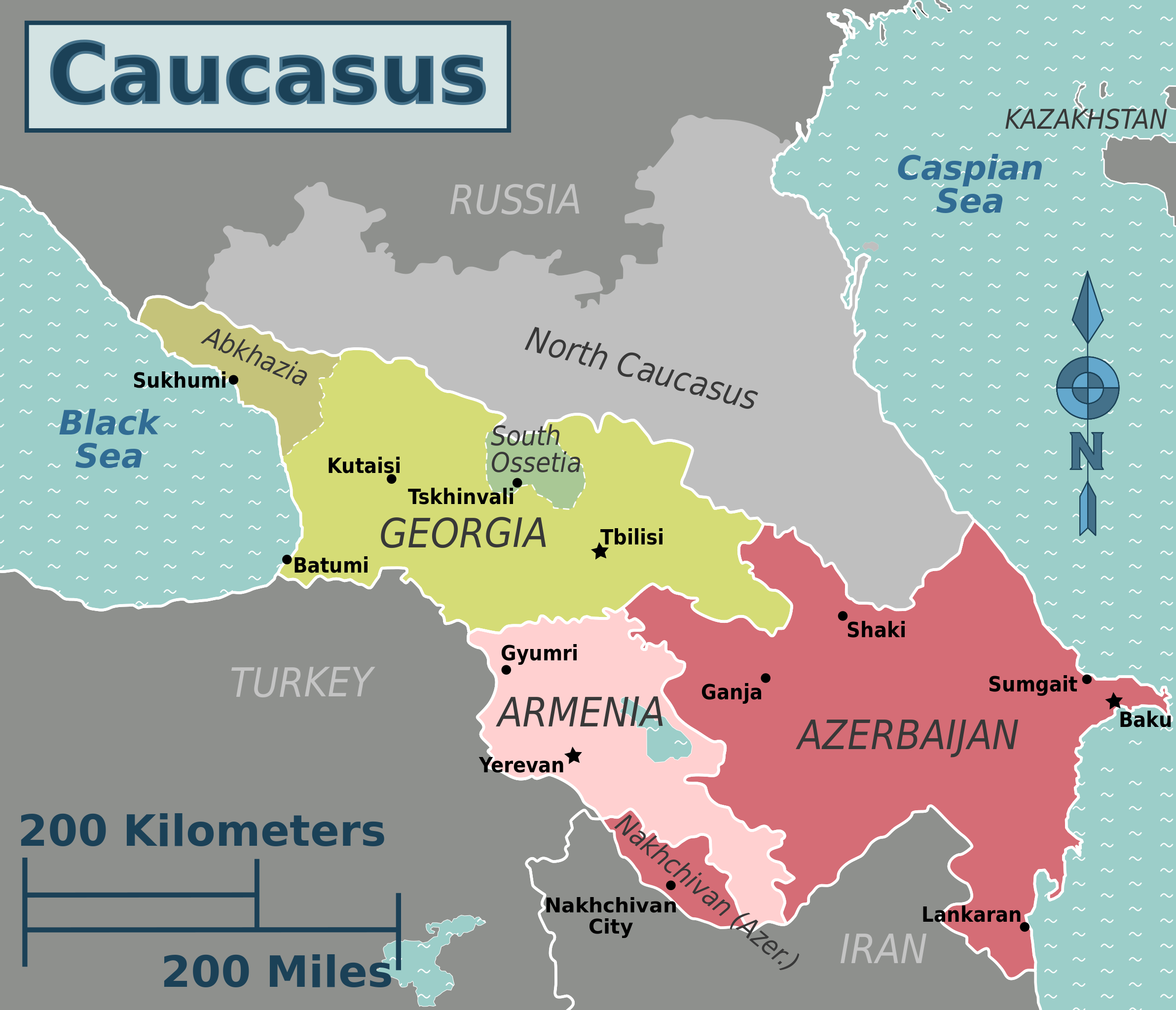
Caucasus region, in which Azerbaijan has already mobilized

On 28 February, the Armenian Government established a working group (from the Security Council of Armenia) to assess the conflict's potential impact on the Caucasus, fearing the possibility of merging the US-Israel war on Iran with the Nagorno-Karabakh conflict and the Georgian-Ossetia conflict. Also Armenia and Azerbaijan developed fears that the Zangezur corridor could being caught in the US-Israeli-Iranian crossfire, while Iran warned Armenia to be cautious of Azerbaijan mobilization and to remember its irredentist claims over the Syunik Province. Despite, as of 4 March, Armenia didn't mobilize its forces on the Armenia–Iran border, not wanting to close the crossroad or to provocate its neighbours.

On the other hand, the Georgian government expressed its preoccupation of spillovers at the country's territory, which has been used by Iranians to bypass Western sanctions, as well as Iranian opposition entities to plan against the IRGGC, stating that the country is under constant attack and that is a violation of the country's neutrality by Georgians who sympathize with a side of the Iranian conflict. However some analysts have accused Georgia of having sympathy with Iran and Russia.

The Kadyrovites, Chechnya's Akhmat special forces who fought in the Islamic State insurgency in the North Caucasus, have stated that they're prepared to mobilize and intervene in the side of the Axis of Resistance in case the Russian interests in the South Caucasus and Ukraine are threatened by a total war instigated by the US-Israel War on Iran. Despite the tensions, Russia has avoided to deploy a conventional military mobilization on its Southern territories in risk of spillovers (not wanting to have tensions with the US and Israel while its forces are focused in occupied Ukraine), preferring to do a more economic mobilization by supplying material support (with China) to the Iran military and take advantage of the increase oil prices from the Hormuz crisis.

Turkey has been showing interest in the struggles of the Azerbaijani and Kurdish separatism in Iran, and also in the Pan-Turkist movements in the Caucasus and Northwestern Iran regions, considering to ally itself with the Iranian Azerbaijanis against the Iranian Kurds in the speculative case of an Iranian civil war, expecting to drag the Azerbaijan government into such a scenery.

== Iran's borders ==
=== Separatists and Iranian opposition ===
The Coordination Council of Ahwazi Organizations, in the context of the US-Israeli strikes on Iranian territory, released a statement asserting that “non-Persian peoples were forcibly annexed into Iran’s political geography”, instigating a collective mobilization among Khuzestani Arabs to secure its Self-determination and restore the historical autonomy of Khuzestan before incorporation during the Pahlavi era and its Centralisation reforms to reach Political modernization. Also the IRGC in the past have repressed Mossad Espionage Cells in Iran that were coordinating with separatist groups, as also the Foundation for Defense of Democracies (an American Think tank) has supported projects of exploiting Iran's multi-ethnic structure to weaken the Islamic Republic.

=== Turkish-Iraqi-Iranian western borders ===
While Turkey has maintained a neutral public stance regarding the US-Israel campaign, the military and intelligence posture on its eastern border is highly active, strengthening it' military presence to safeguard its territory and airspace from the risk of spillover due to the increase of regional tensions at a "terrifying level" due to the impact of the US-Israel War on Iran. The Turkish Government declared that their Air Force will take all necessary measures against the violation of its airspace. Also, currently in Turkey's Incirlik Air Base is mobilized the NATO's Operation Active Fence to intercept Iranian missiles in Turkish airspace (only for defensive goals, not collaborating in US-Israel offensives).

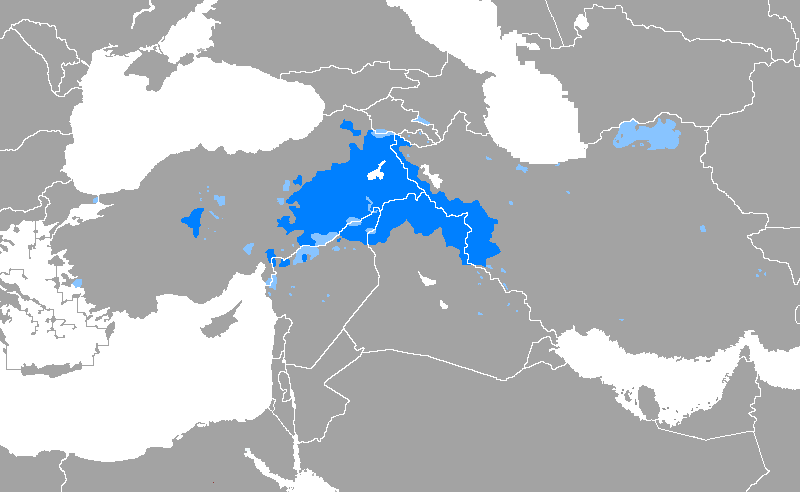
Kurdistan territory through Turkey-Iran-Iraq-Syria territory. Turkey have started to mobilize in its part.

Another motive of mobilization has been the Israel–Turkey proxy conflict in the Fertile Crescent and the 2026 Kurdish–Iranian crisis, as the Turkish intelligence has noted indications that Kurdish armed groups, including the PKK and its Iranian affiliate PJAK, are attempting to exploit the power vacuum to start a war of independence from Iranian Kurdistan through operations from Turkish Kurdistan, which also threatens the security and Territorial integrity of Turkey and its neighbours (as also hardening its relationship with Israel and the US due to the reports of support to Kurdish by both Great powers), desiring to maintain the status quo in Iran. Recep Tayyip Erdoğan's government and the Iraqi Kurdistan government discussed the regional tensions and considered to develop a common policy to end regional conflicts and Iran-backed terrorism as also the one of the Kurdistan Workers' Party.

=== Turkmen-Iranian northeast border ===
Maintaining strict neutrality, Turkmenistan has mobilized its border forces not for combat, but for crisis management. On 5 March, Ashgabat opened additional, heavily militarized border crossings specifically to facilitate the emergency evacuation of foreign citizens and refugees fleeing northeastern Iran, aiming to prevent uncontrolled border breaches and potential skirmishes.

== Asia ==
=== Sri Lanka and India ===
The Sri Lankan Navy stepped in first following the sinking of IRIS Dena near its shores. Sri Lanka had been mobilizing with the goal of "taking action to save lives" of sailors affected by the conflict in the Arabian Sea and who are in transit in the Laccadive Sea. They have aided of Iranian ships such as the IRIS Dena and the IRIS Bushehr. Sri Lanka also denied the use of its airbase by US Bombers during the conflict, seeking to maintain neutrality during the conflict.

The Arabian Sea, main area of intensive patrolling by the Indian, Pakistani and Sri Lankan navies amid the 2026 Iran war spillovers in the Indian Ocean

By March 2nd, the Indian Navy had deployed its Kolkata-class and Visakhapatnam-class guided-missile destroyers to the Arabian Sea and the Gulf of Oman, which had been tasked with providing a defensive shield for Indian-flagged merchant vessels and oil tankers navigating the heavily contested waters around the US-Iranian operational zones, as well as addressing fears of a renewed Houthi blockade. On the other hand, a proposal by the Indian National Shipowners’ Association to deploy Indian ships to the Strait of Hormuz and escort the 36 Indian-flagged ships that had been trapped in the 2026 Strait of Hormuz blockade is being debated. Further Indian naval vessels are being deployed under Operation Sankalp,being re-deployed from anti-piracy measures in Somalia. India also assisted with rescuing sailors at the site of the sinking of IRIS Dena,deploying the INS Ikshak and INS Tarangini and multiple aircraft have been deployed in the vicinity for search and rescue, humanitarian assistance and disaster relief.

The attack on Dena have led to debates amongst geopolitical analysts on the effectiveness of India's perceived role as a "net security provider" in the Indian Ocean; considering India delayed a mobilization response to an attack well within its maritime sphere of influence, compounded by the fact that the IRIS Dena had just been returning from a naval exercise conducted by the Indian Navy. India would later allow the IRIS Lavan to dock at Kochi. Speaking to the media, India's External affairs minister S.Jaishankar defended the nation's policy, stressing that India's approach was guided by humanitarian considerations and that both Dena and Lavan had requested and had been approved to dock at Kochi. An alleged disinformation campaign was led against India, claiming the nation's complicity to the US during the conflict.

India launched Operation Urja Suraksha ("Energy Protection") on 25th March in order to secure oil supplies from the Middle East to India. The Indian Navy provided critical precise instructions to each ship through the Iran-controlled route, closer to the Iran coast than the official shipping lanes. During the operation,India evacuated the highest number of vessels than any other country from the Strait of Hormuz,managing to safeguard close to 340 tonnes of fuel, sustaining 11 days of the nation's import requirements of petrol, diesel and fertilizers.

=== Afghanistan and Pakistan ===
The Pakistani Navy launched Operation Muhafiz-ul-Bahr ("Protector of the Seas") on 9th March with the goal of locking down the Makran coast and securing its exclusive economic zone against the conflict between US submarines and the Iranian navy, aiming to protect shipping lanes, energy supply and key shipping routes threatened by the 2026 Iran war, as well as the 2026 Afghanistan–Pakistan war and a potential renewed Baloch Insurgency. Additionally, the operation was tasked with escorting merchant vessels in coordination with the Pakistan National Shipping Corporation amid the ongoing conflict in the Strait of Hormuz, expecting to preserve long-term regional maritime security, much like India's operations. Another primary directive has been the protection of the strategic ports of Karachi and Gwadar, important to the China-Pakistan Economic Corridor (CPEC), ensuring they do not suffer collateral damage in the crossfire between the Pakistan Army and the Afghan Army backed by the Taliban during the concurrent Afghanistan-Pakistan conflict. Before the start of the 2026 Iran War, Pakistan deployed F-16 Block 52 fighter jets to Saudi Arabia for the "Spears of Victory 2026" exercise (which remain in Saudi territory and are viewed by the House of Saud as part of the operational response to the ongoing Iran-Saudi conflict), and have been considering future military deployments in the region of the Eastern Arabian coast, as stated in a meeting between Pakistan's Field Marshal Asim Munir and Saudi Defense Minister Prince Khalid bin Salman on the 7th of March. In 2026, during the Iran War, Saudi Arabia reportedly invoked the SMDA. Pakistan initially deployed at least 8,000 troops, along with 16 aircraft, two squadrons of drones and an HQ-9 air defense system. The scale of deployment was perceived to be more than a merely symbolic or advisory mission.

Pakistan also started to mobilize troops to repress a renewed Sectarian violence by Shia Islamist since the attack on the US consulate in Karachi and of the offices of the UN Military Observer Group of Kashmir, as the death of Iran's Supreme Leader Ayatollah Ali Khamenei triggered violent protests inspired in Anti-American, Anti-Zionist and Islamic nationalist sentiments.

Al-Qaeda have stated that they will mobilize in the Kashmir region (currently in dispute between India, Pakistan and China) for a renewed Jihadist campaign in reaction to the "global conflicts as part of a broader war against Islam" like the 2026 Iran war, expecting to take advantage of the multiple geopolitical developments to support the Kashmir separatist-Islamic insurgency, expecting to expand Islamic terrorism deeper into India.

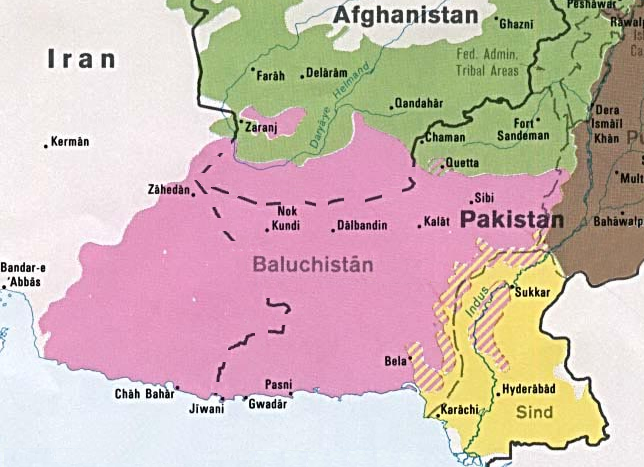
Iran-Pakistan-Afghanistan border territory, in which the separatist region of Balochistan juxtaposes

The Pakistani Government, already mobilized due to the 2026 Afghanistan–Pakistan war (without expecting a mediation from Saudi Arabia and Qatar), has been highly concerned about cross-border clashes in Balochistan (spillover effects, sectarian tensions, or proxy and terrorist activity) due to its western borders with Iran becoming unstable, as that would endanger them with a Two-front war that they cannot afford and that could affect negatively their interests in their eastern borders on the Indo-Pakistan conflict. Also have been movements between Saudi Arabia and Pakistan due to the Strategic Mutual Defence Agreement between both countries, as it "states that any aggression against either country shall be considered an aggression against both", although with goals of deploying forces for coordinating countermeasures against projected spillovers from the 2026 Iran war instead of a Pakistani direct confrontation with Iran yet (as Pakistan considers that Iran is defending itself from US-Israel aggression, and also have worries of Iranian territorial integrity against Baloch separatism). Despite the current strong mobilization in the western borders due to both crises, still Pakistan maintains priority against India, and so the bulk of Pakistan's conventional military capability have remained at the India–Pakistan border, as also has been deployed to repress pro-Iranian protests by violent Shia groups (like in the attack on the US consulate in Karachi). Another motive of mobilization is that Pakistan has preoccupations concerning India–Israel relations and the Indo-Abrahamic Alliance interests in supporting the Baloch Insurgency, fearing that a political collapse of Iran's Islamic Republic will empower Baloch militant networks as a consequence of an expansion of Israel's Sphere of influence beyond Iran (as also being possible that US military would harm infrastructure of the China–Pakistan Economic Corridor through proxies in the context of American Chinese rivalry), and so not desiring a total victory of the US-Israel coalition or an Iranian civil war with social unrests near the borders.

"The collapse of Iran into civil war, its fragmentation into warring states, and the extension of Israeli influence to Pakistan’s western borders are all developments that greatly, and rightly, worry Islamabad (...) If Tehran forces Pakistan to choose between Iran and Saudi Arabia, the choice would unquestionably be in favour of the Saudis"

— Ilhan Niaz, professor of history at Islamabad’s Quaid-i-Azam University

Some analysts has reported that Iran and the Axis of Resistance have made some approachments with Afghanistan and in so with the Taliban government, due to their mutual hostility towards the Islamic State Khorasan Province (IS-KP) and the US military bases in the Greater Middle East. Although such approachment doesn't mean that the Taliban have become an Iranian proxy like Hezbollah (as both states have differences due to Sunni-Shia conflict and the Afghanistan–Iran water dispute), but that they have a tacit alliance of convenience against the US-Israel interventionism in the zone.

=== China ===
Some sources have claimed that Chinese ships (and neutral ships related to Chinese trade) have been the only ones that are being allowed to cross the Strait by the Iranian navy for commerce and technological military exchanges.

Meanwhile, by March 5th there were reports that China had been in talks with Iran to allow safe Oil & LNG carrier passage through the Strait of Hormuz to avoid a disruption of Global Energy Routes, specifically trying to exclude Non-belligerent Gulf states' Merchant ships from the blocked and instead reserve the blockade for ships belonging to the United States, Israel and its European allies.

== Civilian evacuations ==
Tens of thousands of people within the Gulf region are stuck with few ways to leave. The United States, the United Kingdom, Germany, France, Italy, China, and Poland urged citizens to leave Iran and the Gulf states (Middle East). On 6 March, the United Nations declared that the Iran war had evolved into a "major humanitarian emergency" due to the affected regions currently hosting nearly 25 million people as refugees. This high number of refugees is a consequence of the significant population movements in reaction to the increased insecurity by the military activities in the Indian Ocean and the Middle East-South Asia. Due to that humanitarian crisis, the United Nations High Commissioner for Refugees mobilized in the Middle East to help people from Lebanon to Afghanistan that are trying to leave from the regional conflicts.

The US Department of State urged Americans in the Middle East to leave such countries due to "safety risks" as the war could last from four to five weeks or even more, recommending its population to use the available commercial transportation. The US Department of State subsequently announced it was working on bringing Americans in the Middle East home, and stated they are in contact with more than 3,000 Americans there. According to Trump and Rubio, almost 9,000 Americans have evacuated from the Middle East since the start of the strikes. A US state department official stated many more Americans are expected to evacuate, and on 9 March reported that a total of 36,000 Americans have returned from the middle east since 28 February.

Map of emergency evacuation of persons to Europe

Kazakhstan, Turkey, the New Zealand Defence Force and the United Kingdom's Foreign Office said they were developing plans to evacuate their nationals in the region. Russia, through its embassy, made facilitations for Russians unable to leave Iran by liberalizing the route in the Iran–Turkmenistan border. The Foreign Ministry of Italy is expecting to evacuate 30,000 Italians from the UAE, receiving on 3 March around 300 people from Oman and other 200 from the UAE. Italy, Austria, Slovakia and other European countries solicited the help of resources from the European Union in the evacuation. By 6 March, German troops of the Bundeswehr stationed in Bahrain and Kuwait, as also the ones within the UNIFIL mission in Lebanon, were successfully evacuated. The Spanish foreign ministry evacuated the Spanish diplomatic personnel in the Arab states and Iran by 7 March.

Asia-Pacific countries—including China, Japan, South Korea, Taiwan, Indonesia, Pakistan, India and Australia—also developed operations to evacuate their citizens trapped in the Persian Gulf by 3 March, and to secure energy supplies and monitor financial markets. According to the Indian Ministry of Civil Aviation, Indian airlines brought at least 52,000 passengers, including 32,107 onboard Indian carriers and the others by foreign airlines, according to the Indian Ministry of External Affairs. These included passengers stranded in UAE, Saudi Arabia, and Oman to India. Besides commercial repatriation flights, the Singapore government will also deploy a Republic of Singapore Air Force A330 MRTT aircraft to repatriate Singaporeans in the region on two separate flights from Saudi Arabia.

The Iran–Turkey border day-trip passenger crossings was closed by 2 March to avoid a Refugee crisis. People started to leave Kazakhstan to reach the Caucasus through Azerbaijan's Astara crossing, and by 6 March both Azerbaijan (who successfully evacuated its diplomatic personnel from Tehran) and Armenia have received 1500 refugees from Iran (mostly Chinese, Russians and other foreigners) while Georgia became a refugee for Iranian people related to the opposition. However, the UN refugee agency stated there has been no major exodus from Iran. The UAE announced its intent to repatriate 44,000 travelers. The Israeli military issued warnings to evacuate almost the entire southern Lebanon, causing tens of thousands to hundreds of thousands of people to flee. The entire region that Israel warned to evacuate is said to house around 500,000 people.

== See also ==
- List of countries with overseas military bases
