= Essar Bhander Power Plant =

Bhander Power Plant is a natural gas-based thermal power plant located near Hazira in Surat district in the Indian state of Gujarat. The power plant was commissioned in 2006 by EPC Construction India Limited (Formerly known as Essar Projects India Limited) and commenced commercial operations in 2008 by Essar Energy.

On 3 March 2020, ArcelorMittal Nippon Steel India Private Limited acquired this power plant from Edelweiss Asset Reconstruction Company under the Securitisation and Reconstruction of Financial Assets and Enforcement of Security Interest Act, 2002.

== Capacity ==
It has an installed capacity of 500 MW. The plant has been functional since October 2008.
