= Pakistan in the 2026 Iran war =

Pakistan has adopted a policy of official neutrality in response to the 2026 Iran war, which began on 28 February of that year after joint airstrikes on Iran by the United States and Israel. The Ministry of Foreign Affairs of Pakistan has officially condemned all attacks on Iran (by the United States and Israel), and all attacks on the Gulf states (by Iran). Pakistan has also played a central role in diplomacy by mediating a two-week ceasefire, which was later extended, and subsequently hosting the first round of the Islamabad Talks on 10 and 11 April, with the second round due towards the end of April.

Pakistan, which shares a 900-kilometer border with Iran and has close ties with both Iran and Saudi Arabia, has condemned attacks by all sides while engaging in shuttle diplomacy, facing domestic protests and an energy crisis linked to the conflict, and fighting Afghanistan simultaneously.

== Background ==
The war began on 28 February 2026, with joint US-Israeli strikes that killed Iran's Supreme Leader Ayatollah Ali Khamenei and other officials. Iran responded with missile and drone attacks on Israel and several Gulf states, including Saudi Arabia.

Pakistan signed a Strategic Mutual Defence Agreement with Saudi Arabia on 17 September 2025. The agreement views aggression against one party as aggression against both, although it does not mandate automatic military intervention.

== Diplomatic position ==
Pakistan condemned the US-Israeli attacks on Iran and the subsequent Iranian attacks on Gulf countries. Prime Minister Shahbaz Sharif's government called Khamenei's assassination a clear violation of international law.

Deputy Prime Minister and Foreign Minister Ishaq Dar engaged in shuttle diplomacy. During the Organization of Islamic Cooperation meeting in Riyadh, Dar reminded Iranian leaders of Pakistan’s defense obligations to Saudi Arabia and assured them that Saudi soil would not be used to attack Iran. This resulted in no Iranian attack on Saudi Arabia or Oman.

Sharif met with Saudi Crown Prince Mohammed bin Salman in Jeddah around 12 March 2026 and expressed "full solidarity and support" for Saudi Arabia, while continuing to engage with Iranian officials. Analysts described this approach as "limited alignment without military entanglements", with Pakistan signaling diplomatic sympathy for Iran while avoiding direct war.

Pakistan offered to host mediation talks and presented itself as a potential bridge between the parties. Defense Minister Khawaja Asif had previously stressed the importance of the US relationship but ruled out military participation in any campaign against Iran.

Sharif has repeatedly called for an immediate reduction in hostilities in Iran and the Gulf region. In a telephone conversation with Azerbaijani President Ilham Aliyev on 20 March, as well as with Malaysia, Uzbekistan called for restraint, a diplomatic easing. Sharif and his counterpart stressed the need for "dialogue and diplomacy" to resolve tensions, while reiterating Pakistan's commitment to regional peace and stability.

On 23 March, the Pakistani Foreign Office offered Islamabad as a venue for US-Iran talks to end the war. On 31 March, Pakistan along with China announced a five-point proposal that includes calling for ceasefire and resumption of normal navigation in Strait of Hormuz. African Union expressed support for the proposal, saying: "The initiative constitutes a timely and constructive contribution to ongoing international efforts to de-escalate tensions."

A 45-day two-phased truce plan by Pakistan is reported on 6 April that has been shared with Iran and the United States. Under the proposal, a ceasefire would take effect immediately; reopening the Strait of Hormuz is expected within about 15 to 20 days to finalise a broader settlement.

With Trump's previous threat of deadline of 8 p.m ET on 7 April looming, the prime minister of Pakistan urged Trump extend his Tuesday night deadline by another two weeks "to allow diplomacy to run its course." His two-week ceasefire deal was accepted by Trump before the deadline.

On 10 April, Pakistan’s Defence Minister Khawaja Asif deleted a post on X in which he described Israel as ‘cancerous' and 'a curse for humanity’. The remarks were criticised by Israeli officials, who questioned Pakistan’s role as a mediator in the talks.

=== Operation Economic Outcast ===
On 27 August, in response to Scott Bessent's announcement of new sanctions against Iran, Pakistan's foreign ministry spokesperson Tahir Andrabi was initially reported to have said that Pakistan was "not obliged" to comply with unilaterally imposed sanctions on Iran unless they were authorized by the UN, highlighting "a desire to expand" trade between the neighbours. He was also reported to have denied the legality of the sanctions and to have called for a resolution of issues through dialogue. Later the same day, however, The News International and Geo News reported a "clarification" on behalf of unspecified authorities, which said that Pakistan neither commented on nor engaged in the interpretation of US sanctions on Iran and remained committed to the negotiations between Washington and Tehran.

== Domestic reaction ==
Following Khamenei's death, protests erupted across Pakistan, particularly among the Shia community (estimated at 15-20% of the population). Protesters condemned the United States and Israel, with some accusing the Pakistani government of being too close to Washington D.C..

In Karachi, protesters attempted to storm the U.S. Consulate on 1 March 2026. At least 10 people were killed and more than 60 were injured when U.S. Marine security guards opened fire. At least 23 protesters were killed in clashes across the country by early March, with a three-day curfew in Gilgit-Baltistan. Protesters burned portraits of U.S. President Donald Trump and Israeli Prime Minister Benjamin Netanyahu, while also holding pictures of Ali Khamenei.

Public sentiment strongly supported Iran, complicating the government's position. Sharif had previously praised Trump and nominated him for the Nobel Peace Prize. Videos of those remarks have resurfaced and drawn criticism.

On 20 March 2026, Chief of Defence Forces Field Marshal Asim Munir met Shia clerics in Rawalpindi. He apprised them of Pakistan's diplomatic efforts to defuse regional tensions and warned that "violence in Pakistan, based on incidents taking place in another country, will not be tolerated", stressing the role of clerics in maintaining social harmony and countering sectarian narratives.

On 3 April 2026, the Pakistani government announced a record-breaking increase in domestic fuel prices, with petrol rising to PKR 458.40 and high-speed diesel reaching PKR 520.35 per litre. This adjustment represented a surge of over 40% in fuel costs within a single month resulted in massive protests, political criticism, and business warnings over soaring inflation.

== Economic and security implications ==
=== Economic ===
The dispute triggered an energy crisis in Pakistan by disrupting oil flows in the Gulf. Remittances from millions of Pakistani workers in Saudi Arabia and other Gulf states were also at risk.

In response to the partial closure of the Strait of Hormuz and threats to Gulf shipping lanes following Iran's retaliatory actions, the Pakistan Navy launched Operation Muhafiz-ul-Bahr on 9 March 2026. The operation deploys naval assets to protect Pakistani merchant ships, ensure communication systems, disrupt energy flows, and ensure the smooth flow of the sea. On which the country relies for about 90 percent of its oil imports from the Gulf region. It works in conjunction with the Pakistan National Shipping Corporation, with initial escorts including oil tankers safely reaching Karachi.

On the same day of the operation, the Pakistani government announced emergency austerity measures. These included a four-day workweek for federal and provincial employees, a two-week closure of educational institutions, and restrictions on non-essential energy use to conserve fuel reserves until mid-April.

Due to the national fuel crisis, PM Shehbaz Sharif restricted travel to save energy, forcing the Pakistan Super League to be played without crowds. The tournament was moved entirely to Lahore and Karachi, with the opening ceremony and matches in other cities cancelled to prioritize fuel preservation.

=== Security ===
Analysts warned of potential spillover along the Iran-Pakistan border, an influx of refugees, sectarian violence, and instability in Balochistan. The defense agreement with Saudi Arabia raised questions about whether Pakistan could provide defense assistance, such as air defense support, if Riyadh requested it. On April 11, the Saudi Defence Ministry announced the arrival of Pakistani fighter jets and support aircraft at King Abdulaziz Air Base to "strengthen joint defence cooperation and support regional and international security and stability". Reuters reported, citing sources including a Pakistani government official, that the deployment was in response to an Iranian strike on a Saudi petrochemical complex and "not there to attack anyone".

== See also ==
- 2026 Iran war ceasefire
- Islamabad Talks
- Islamabad Memorandum
- India in the 2026 Iran war
- List of country-specific articles on the 2026 Iran war
