= India in the 2026 Iran war =

India has remained neutral in the 2026 Iran War, which began on 28 February 2026 when the United States and Israel launched airstrikes on Iran. India condemned strikes on American bases, without mentioning Iran, while facing a domestic energy crisis linked to the conflict following the closure of the Strait of Hormuz by Iran. The Indian National Congress condemned the BJP-led Indian government for not condemning the attacks of the US and Israel against Iran.

== Diplomatic position ==
The Ministry for External Affairs expressed its concerns and requested all three nations for a ceasefire. Prime Minister Narendra Modi, spoke with Gulf leaders, namely King Abdullah II, King Hamad bin Isa Al Khalifa, and Crown Prince Mohammed bin Salman and condemned the strikes and attack on sovereignty without mentioning Iran. Modi also spoke with the Israeli Prime Minister Benjamin Netanyahu. The Indian government did not condemn the assassination of Khamenei, just like in similar previous cases. However, Foreign Secretary Vikram Misri signed a condolence book a few days later without mentioning any background of Khamenei's demise. India would also send two contigents of medical aid to Iran.

In March 2026, the film The Voice of Hind Rajab documenting the Red Crescent response during the killing of Hind Rajab, a six-year-old Palestinian girl, by the Israel Defense Forces, was blocked by the Indian government, which said that the film could negatively impact India's relations with Israel amid the war with Iran.

On 19 April, Iran closed the Strait of Hormuz and fired on two Indian ships. Following this incident, the Iranian envoy was summoned by the Ministry of External Affairs. Iran later stated that the shooting was not intentional.

On 22 April, Iran seized an India-bound Liberian ship seeking to cross Strait of Hormuz.

Prime Minister Modi and President Pezeshkian in August 2026

On 12 June, at least 3 Indian sailors were killed after an American strike on a Palau-flagged oil tanker off Oman. Following this incident, the American Chargé d'affaires (CDA) was summoned by the Ministry of External Affairs. Opposition leader Rahul Gandhi criticised PM Narendra Modi for maintaining silence over the deaths of Indian sailors.

In October 2026, amidst reports of life-saving medicine exports from India facing challenges in reaching Iran due to the conflict, India said it continues to supply Iran on humanitarian grounds.

On 4 November 2026 Iran announced that Indian ships were granted an exemption while crossing the Strait of Hormuz.

== Sanctions ==
US has sanctioned Indian firms in August and November 2026.

== Analysis ==
Indian National Congress condemned the 'targeted assassination' of Ayatollah Ali Khamenei and criticized the timing of Narendra Modi's visit to Israel during the end of February. Congress also criticised the lack of reaction of Modi government with regards to the attacks on Iran by the US and Israel. Following the reports of Pakistan positioning itself as the major mediator for ending the war between the US and Iran, Congress leader Rahul Gandhi described foreign policy of Modi a "joke" on 23 March. One day later, Modi said India is in touch with the involved parties "to reach a peaceful solution as soon as possible" with regards to Iran war.

The Wire, analyzing the role of Pakistan in mediation noted that, "emergence of Pakistan, alongside Egypt and Türkiye, as a primary back-channel interlocutor between Iran and the United States is a stinging strategic setback for New Delhi. For a government that has staked its reputation on isolating Pakistan and projecting India as the indispensable Vishwaguru under Narendra Modi's personal leadership, this development is nothing short of a political and diplomatic catastrophe."

The sinking of IRIS Dena, returning to Iran from India after participating in naval exercises conducted by the Indian Navy, about 19 nautical miles (35 km; 22 mi) off the coast of Galle, Sri Lanka, in the Indian Ocean by the US, ignited debates on the effectiveness of India's self-proclaimed status as the "net security provider" in the Indian Ocean; considering India delayed a mobilization response to an attack well within its maritime sphere of influence, compounded by the fact that Dena had just been returning from a naval exercise conducted by the Indian Navy.

Kapil Komireddi, writing for UnHerd noted regarding the BRICS that, "Every other founding member — Russia, China and Brazil — quickly denounced the war. India alone seemed to be condoning it with silence." He further added, "Given its sheer size and human scale, India may be on its way to becoming the largest single non-hostile casualty of the war in West Asia. For all its preening proclamations of its own rise and importance on the world stage, Modi's "New India" proved too inconsequential to influence the warmakers — and too weak, craven, and self-woundingly stupid to be spared its effects."

Following the announcement of 2-week ceasefire between the US-Israel and Iran, mediated by Pakistan, The Straits Times noted that "India is experiencing some heartburn over Pakistan’s visible role in negotiating the ceasefire between Iran and the US – a challenge to its own ambitions as the South Asian regional hegemon". Opposition leader Rahul Gandhi described Pakistan’s growing influence on the global stage as a failure of Modi government's foreign policy.

Tahir Azad, writing for the Small Wars Journal, writes that while India remained neutral in the war, it has still suffered immensely from it.

Vanshika Saraf, a research analyst for Takshashila Institution, writes that India's response is characterised by "the immediate safety of the Indian diaspora, the preservation of energy supply chains and the maintenance of a calibrated diplomatic neutrality while asserting India’s interests in global forums."

== Domestic reaction ==
=== Energy crisis in India ===
People standing in a long queue to obtain gas cylinders in Sikkim, India, on 3 April 2026.

LPG cylinder shortage leading to long queues in Mehsana, Gujarat

Brent crude price per barrel increased from US$80 to US$120, in between 2 and 9 March. The household spending on cooking fuel rose by 7% in meantime.

90% of India's Liquefied petroleum gas (LPG) imports pass through the strait of Hormuz, India relies heavily on imports to meet its LPG demands. Following the closure of the strait by Iran, protests erupted across India over the shortage of LPG. The prices for LPG increased by ₹60 and ₹144 for the 14.2 kg and 19 kg cylinder variants respectively. The price for a 14.2 kg cylinder has reached ₹4,000 in black market.

Long queues outside fuel and LPG distribution centres have been reported across India, the demand for induction burners also exploded. On Amazon, the sales of induction stoves increased more than thirtyfold.

The government has allowed hotels and restaurants to utilise biomass as a fuel source for a month. Restaurants and hotels in India have begun shifting to burning firewood as a fuel source, leading to an increase in food prices. 48,000 kilolitres of additional kerosene was also approved by the centre. These measures have been projected to contribute to indoor air pollution and health disorders.

Gujarat's tile and ceramic industry has also suspended production for three weeks.

By April, early stages of reverse migration of migrants in cities was being reported due to cooking gas shortages.

Amidst the crisis India is sending 210,000 MT/month (fuel) to Nepal and 24,000 MT/month (fuel) to Bhutan. It has sent 45,000 MT petroleum to Sri Lanka and 38,000 MT diesel to Bangladesh.

On 11 May, Narendra Modi urged Indians to reduce purchase of gold, reduce petrol and diesel consumption, and work from home amid the crisis due to Iran war.

As the war progresses, India has diversified its fuel imports. To meet domestic demands, India has sourced fuel from 31 countries, adding ten new countries into the mix. Russia continues to be the top supplier.

== See also ==
- Pakistan in the 2026 Iran war
- China in the 2026 Iran war
- Operation Urja Suraksha
