= Operation Muhafiz-ul-Bahr =

Pakistani military operation during the Iran war

- Part of the 2026 Strait of Hormuz crisis, Pakistan in the 2026 Iran war and 2026 Iran war
- Type: Naval operation
- Location: Arabian Sea; Persian Gulf; Red Sea
- Planned by: Pakistan
- Objective: Protection of national Sea lines of communication; Uninterrupted flow of energy supplies to the country
- Date: 9 March 2026 – present (4 months, 4 weeks and 2 days)
- Executed by: Pakistan Armed Forces: Pakistan Navy
- Outcome: Ongoing

Operation Muhafiz-ul-Bahr (Urdu: مُحافظ البحر, lit. 'Protector of the Sea') is a maritime security operation launched by the Pakistan Navy on 9 March 2026 to safeguard Pakistan's Sea Lines of Communications (SLOCs) and ensure the uninterrupted flow of energy supplies to the country amidst the ongoing 2026 Iran war.

== Background ==
Pakistan imports approximately 90% of its oil from the Gulf region. The operation was triggered by the 2026 Iran war, during which Iran's Revolutionary Guard issued warnings prohibiting vessel passage through the strait, and As of 12 March 2026, and has made 21 confirmed attacks on merchant ships, leading to a 20% spike in domestic fuel prices.

== Scope of the operations ==
Nearly 90% of Pakistan's trade moves through maritime channels, while a large portion of its oil imports transit the Gulf before reaching Pakistani ports. Naval officials say the operation aims to prevent supply chain disruptions, especially to the energy sector, which has suffered due to the Strait of Hormuz blockade.

Pakistani reports state that the Navy's operation is defensive only with operations being limited mainly to secure and escort Pakistani flagged merchant vessels along key maritime routes through the Persian Gulf, Arabian Sea and Red Sea regions rather than engaging in all out combat with the Iranians.

The operation's first publicly reported escort mission involved two Pakistan National Shipping Corporation vessels. These tankers, carrying between 100 and 120 million litres of oil, arrived safely in Karachi after being escorted by Pakistan Navy warships from Fujairah in the United Arab Emirates. The escort was conducted in coordination with the Pakistan National Shipping Corporation. Federal Minister for Maritime Affairs Muhammad Junaid Anwar Chaudhry expressed gratitude to the Navy for ensuring the secure passage of the vessels. The vessels are operating in close proximity to missile threats and are co-odinating with other nations such as India on safe navigation of vessels in the region.

== Deployed units ==
- Tughril-class frigates

== See also ==
- 2026 Iran war regional mobilizations
- Operation Atalanta
- Operation Aspides
- Operation Urja Suraksha
- 1979 oil crisis
- Maritime Security Patrol Area
