= Middle East Media center for studies =

Middle East Media Center

MEMCS is the Middle East Media Center for Studies. MEMCS is a newly formed independent organization based in Egypt, which aims at delivering credible news to the international community. The founding partner of MEMCS is Author and journalist Abdel Latif El-menawy.
