= Essar Hazira Power Plant =

Thermal power plant in Gujarat, India

Essar Hazira Power Plant is a gas-based thermal power plant located near at Hazira in Surat district in the Indian state of Gujarat. The power plant was operated by the Essar Energy.
