= Abdel Latif El Menawy =

Egyptian author/journalist

Abdel Latif Fouad El-Menawy "عبد اللطيف المناوي" is an author, columnist, and multimedia journalist who covered war zones and conflicts around the world. He is the author of "Tahrir- the last 18 days of Mubarak ". He wrote the book as an eyewitness to events happened during the 18 days before the stepdown of Former Egyptian President Hosni Mubarak.

He is a member of the National Union of Journalists (NUJ) in the United Kingdom and the Egyptian Journalists Syndicate. El-Menawy was also one of the International Emmy Awards 2010 Jurors.

El-Menawy founded the Middle East Media Center for Studies in September 2013. MEMCS is a research center that works mainly in Egypt to follow political, economic and cultural issues around the country.

== Career ==
Through his professional career in journalism, Abdel Latif El-Menawy covered Bosnia during the war in 1994. He also reported from Sudan in 1989. Libya, Algeria, France, Hong Kong and Germany are also countries he reported on hot issues from. El-Menawy's latest public position was President of Egypt's News Center. Egypt News Center consists of Egypt News which produces news for Egyptian local television channels, Nile News which covers world news and Egypt's for Arab audience, and Nile International which covers Egypt to international audience in three languages English French and Hebrew. He established Radio Misr which is the first thematic radio station that produces news in different light forms for radio listeners inside Egypt. Radio Misr mixed news with songs in a bid to increase listening ratings which made it very popular especially during the events of the 25th of January. El-Menawy held this position from 2005 till he resigned at the end of March 2011.

El-Menawy was the head of the Egypt News Center until March 2011, when he submitted his resignation to Egypt's interim government following protests by hundreds of members of the Egyptian Radio and Television Union who claimed he had misled the public in reporting on the January 25 Revolution.

During this period of time, he was responsible for all news coverage that comes out of the state television. He centralized news reporting in the Egyptian Radio and Television Union. El-Menawy extended coverage of political, economic and social events in the country to most of Egypt's governorates.

He opened the state television to the idea of covering all cities and towns in the country instead of covering Cairo as covering Egypt. El-Menawy worked on pushing reporters to take different angles when covering government activities. He introduced the concept of public television instead of state television through giving different political and social parties in Egypt a voice through the national television one way or the other and whenever possible. He pushed for increasing focus on daily sufferings of the Egyptian citizen. El-Menawy introduced feature reporting in a way to address such problems in society in a bid to avoid government censorship. He also established website reporting in State Television. He was responsible for establishing 3 main news websites Egypt news, Nile news and Nile International which has news in English, French and Hebrew. He moved the Hebrew transmission from Satellite to internet broadcast in a bid to reach Israeli citizens.

He was responsible of the coverage of the referendum on the constitution in March 2011, parliament and Shura council election 2010 the presidential election in 2005, events of the 25th of January which this book covers .He introduced documentary making to Egypt News Center which won many awards.

El-Menawy was one of the main current affairs programs’ presenters through 2001 to 2011. He hosted 3 famous programs “Third Opinion”, “Special Edition”, and “Point of View”. In these programs he interviewed local and international political figures. These public figures include, Ethiopian Prime Minister Meles Zinawi, Eritrean President Isaisi Afewerki, President of South Sudan Silva Kiir, Late Palestinian President Yasser Arafat, the then Arab league Secretary Amr Moussa, Former President Hosni Mubarak, Former National Democratic Party Secretary for political committee Gamal Mubarak, and the then First Lady Suzan Mubarak. Other interviews include Sudanese President Omar Elbashir, former Sudanese president Elsadek Elmahdy and Libyan President Moamar Ghadafi. Lockerbie bomber Abdelbaset Ali al-Megrahi gave his first interview from behind bars to El-Menawy.

El-Menawy has a number of investigative documentaries and articles on Gamat Islamia. El-Menawy also held the position of Managing Editor of Alsharq Alawsat in London, United Kingdom. He then moved to its office in Cairo, where he held the position of managing editor and headed the newspaper's office in Cairo. El-Menawy is a newspaper columnist.

He wrote articles and opinion columns in Alahram newspaper and website, Alsharq Alawsat, Alahram Almasaay, in addition to Alahram Eleqtesady magazine. El-Menawy's books focuses mostly on how the aspects of politics and Islam join. He is the author of “Copts, the church or the nation?” which defines the Copts role in the country. He also wrote “Raise the Ceiling” and “Unfinished Sentences” which views the Arab, Egyptian current political situation.

El-Menawy is also the author of “Reformation of Gamat Islamia in Egypt, Witness to the Stop of Violence”. This book follows the steps of Gamat leaders to change its direction away from violence. His next project in writing is a book on Aljihad group through interviews with its leaders inside and outside of prison.

El-Menawy has special interest in political Islam and Arab affairs especially Sudan and Libya. He was interviewed in different Arab Satellite channels as an expert in Arab politics.

He won many awards:

- Best Print Interview in 1989 on a number of interviews in “Almegalah” magazine.
- The Committee Award at the Television and Radio Cairo Festival in 1998 on the documentary “Egypt and Syria Union”.
- Best Interview in 1986 on the first interview with former Sudanese President Gafar Nomiri.
- The Committee Award for Best Television Interview at the Television and Radio Cairo Festival in 2001 on the program “Third Opinion”.

El menawy was born in the city of Damietta, Egypt in 1960. He graduated from the Faculty of Mass communication at Cairo University majoring in journalism in 1982.

== Controversy ==
During his time as Head of News for Egyptian State Television, he was largely responsible for the content and quality of programming on controversial issues such as anti-government protests, deteriorating economic conditions in the country, and the 2010 parliamentary elections. In frequent interviews, he has argued that Egyptian state television during the revolution was neutral and professional. He currently writes bi-weekly column at Almasry Alyoum newspaper. He is also often used in Western media as a political analyst to comment on the turbulent political situation in Egypt.

== Book ==
A year after the revolution, Abdel Latif El-Menawy published a book that was forwarded by journalist and leader writer at the Times Michael Binyon titled "Tahrir: The last 18 days of Mubarak, an insider's account of the uprising in Egypt". In his book, El-Menawy revealed many scenes that wasn't known. One of which is Suzan Mubarak crying in the presidential palace before leaving on the helicopter. He, also, told about his secret conversations with SCAF and the media minister.
