= Parbatipur, Bishnupur =

Parbatipur
- Village
- Location in West Bengal Location in India
- Coordinates: 22.4006°N 88.2692°E
- Country: India
- State: West Bengal
- District: South 24 Parganas
- CD Block: Bishnupur I

Area
  - Total: 0.72 km^{2} (0.28 sq mi)
- Elevation: 9 m (30 ft)

Population (2011)
  - Total: 1,796
  - Density: 2,500/km^{2} (6,500/sq mi)

Languages
  - Official: Bengali
  - Additional official: English
- Time zone: UTC+5:30 (IST)
- PIN: 700104
- Telephone code: +91 33
- Vehicle registration: WB-19 to WB-22, WB-95 to WB-99
- Lok Sabha constituency: Diamond Harbour
- Vidhan Sabha constituency: Bishnupur (SC)
- Website: www.s24pgs.gov.in

Parbatipur is a village within the jurisdiction of the Bishnupur police station in the Bishnupur I CD block in the Alipore Sadar subdivision of the South 24 Parganas district in the Indian state of West Bengal. Parbatipur is located at 22°24′02″N 88°16′09″E. It has an average elevation of 9 metres (30 ft). As per 2011 Census of India, Parbatipur had a total population of 1,796. Parbatipur is on the National Highway 12. Chandi Doulatabad Block Primary Health Centre, with 10 beds, at Doulatabad (PO Nepalganj), is the major government medical facility in the Bishnupur I CD block.
