= Great Eastern Shipping =

Indian shipping company

The Great Eastern Shipping Company Limited
- Company type: Public company
- Traded as: BSE: 500620; NSE: GESHIP
- Industry: Shipping
- Founded: 1948
- Headquarters: Worli, Mumbai, Maharashtra
- Key people: K. M. Sheth (Chairman); Bharat K. Sheth, (MD)
- Revenue: ₹42.00 billion (US$440 million)
- Website: www.greatship.com

The Great Eastern Shipping Company Limited (also known as GE Shipping) is an Indian shipping company which primarily transports liquid, gas and solid bulk products. As of 2023, the company is the largest private sector shipping company in India.

== History ==
The Great Eastern Shipping Company Limited (also known as GE Shipping) was founded by the Sheth family and the Bhiwandiwalla family, who started GE Shipping to assist in expanding the reach of their trading businesses. As of 2023, GE Shipping has over 500 employees. The company is publicly traded on India's two main stock exchanges, the Bombay Stock Exchange and the National Stock Exchange.

== Business segments ==
GE Shipping's business is divided into two main segments, shipping and offshore. The shipping business is involved in the transportation of crude oil, petroleum products, liquified gas and dry bulk commodities. The company's offshore business involves conducting offshore exploration and production services, which GE Shipping does by providing exploratory drilling rigs, offshore support vessels and other services, through its wholly owned subsidiary Greatship (India) Limited. GE Shipping has been certified SO 9001: 2015, ISO 14001: 2015 and ISO 45001: 2018 standards by DNV.GL.

== Shipping fleet ==
As of 2022, GE Shipping has a fleet of 42 ships, which includes 8 crude tankers, 18 product carriers, 5 gas carriers and 14 dry bulk carriers.
