= Nayara Energy =

Indian Petroleum Company

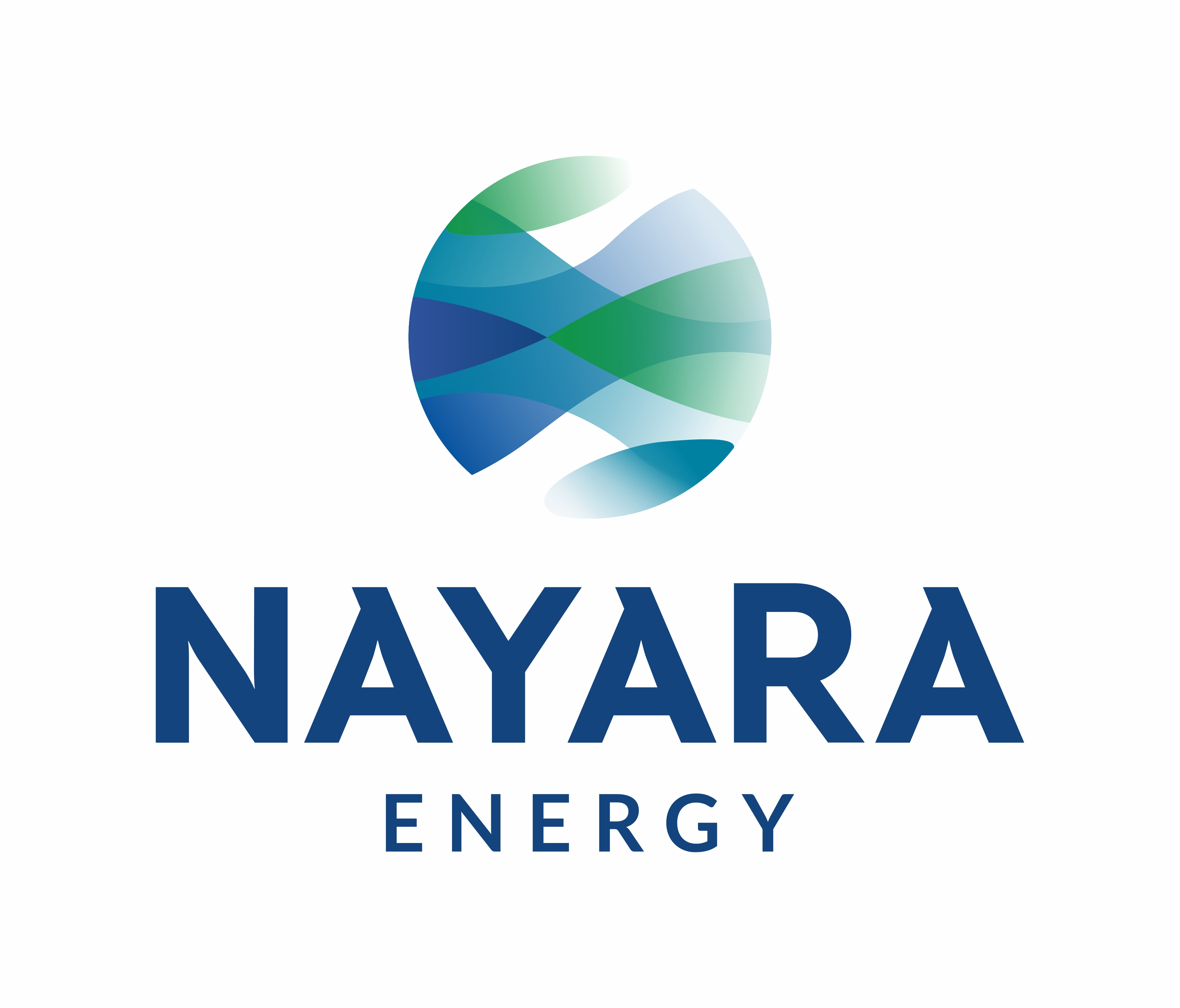

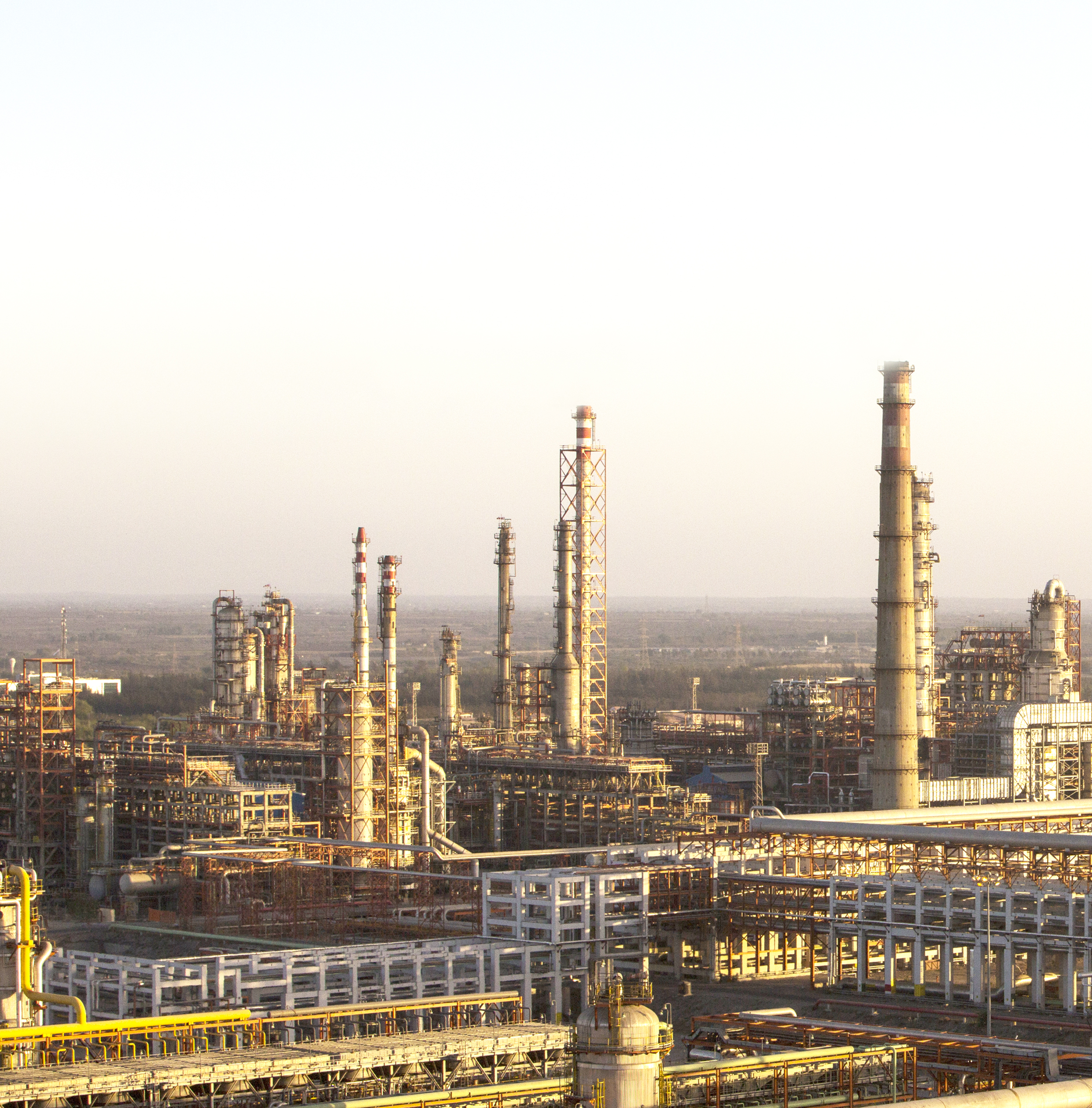
- Nayara Energy Refinery at Vadinar, Gujarat
- Formerly: Essar Oil Limited
- Type: Private
- Industry: Oil and gas
- Founded: 12 September 1989; 37 years ago
- Founder: Shashi, Ravi Ruia
- Headquarters: Nayara Energy Limited 5th Floor, Godrej BKC, Plot No. C-68, G Block, Bandra Kurla Complex, Bandra (East), Mumbai - 400 051, Maharashtra, India
- Key people: Teymur Abasguliyev (CEO); Prasad K Panicker (Executive Chairman)
- Products: Petroleum
- Revenue: ▼₹150,324 crore (US$16 billion) (2025)
- Operating income: ▼₹9,528 crore (US$990 million) (2025)
- Net income: ▼₹6,079 crore (US$630 million) (2025)
- Total assets: ▼₹85,447 crore (US$8.9 billion) (2025)
- Total equity: ▲₹50,010 crore (US$5.2 billion) (2025)
- Owners: Rosneft (49.13%); Kesani Enterprises Co Ltd and United Capital Partners(49.13%)
- Website: www.nayaraenergy.com

Nayara Energy Limited (NEL) (pronounced na-yaa-raa -ˈnæ.ˈjɑː rə) is an Indo-Russian oil refining and marketing company that owns and operates Vadinar Refinery located at Dwarka district of Devbhumi Dwarka Vadinar, Gujarat, India with a capacity of 250 MMTPA of refining capacity Crude oil processed making it the second largest refinery in India. It operates 6000+ Nayara branded outlets and over 1200 petrol pumps in various states.

== History ==
Nayara Energy operates the second-largest refinery in India. It is in Vadinar, Devbhoomi Dwarka District, a few kilometres from the world's largest refining complex (Jamnagar Refinery of Reliance Industries).

=== Buyout ===
It was a publicly traded company (NSE: ESSAROIL and BSE: 500134) until it was taken private in a leveraged buyout which closed on 30 December 2015. It was delisted valued at ₹380 billion (US$5.3 billion).

== Operations ==
It operates over 7000 retail fuel outlets in the country, highest for any private oil company in India.

The refinery is supported by a crude oil tanker facility, water intake facilities, a multi-fuel power plant, a product jetty, dispatch facilities (rail, road, and sea) and retail outlets.

Vadinar processes ~400,000 bpd (~20 million MT/year), making it India's second‑largest single‑site refinery, with ~7,000 retail outlets under the Nayara brand.

== International sanctions ==
=== July 2025 – European Union sanctions ===
On 18 July 2025, amid its 18th sanctions package targeting Russian oil and energy revenues, the EU designated Nayara Energy's Gujarat-based Vadinar refinery—49.13 % owned by Russia's Rosneft—as subject to sanctions, citing its status as the "biggest Rosneft refinery in India" and its role in refining Russian crude into petroleum products.

These measures include:

- "prohibition on importing refined petroleum products made from Russian crude via third countries (effective after a 6‑month transition);"
- "asset freezes, travel bans, and restrictions on financial services and shipping/insurance for activities linked to refining or transporting Russian oil — including involvement in the EU "shadow fleet";"
- "a lowered EU oil price cap on Russian crude (approx. US$47.6/bbl, effective 3 Sept 2025) with a dynamic mechanism to prevent evasion;"

Impact and response:

- "Nayara is banned from exporting to the EU, and risks losing access to European banking, insurance, and technology services."
- "India criticised the move as “unilateral” and accused the EU of “double standards”, citing strategic energy needs."
- "The sanctions likely hinder Rosneft’s planned 49 % stake sale and complicate Reliance’s cross-border fuel exports to Europe."

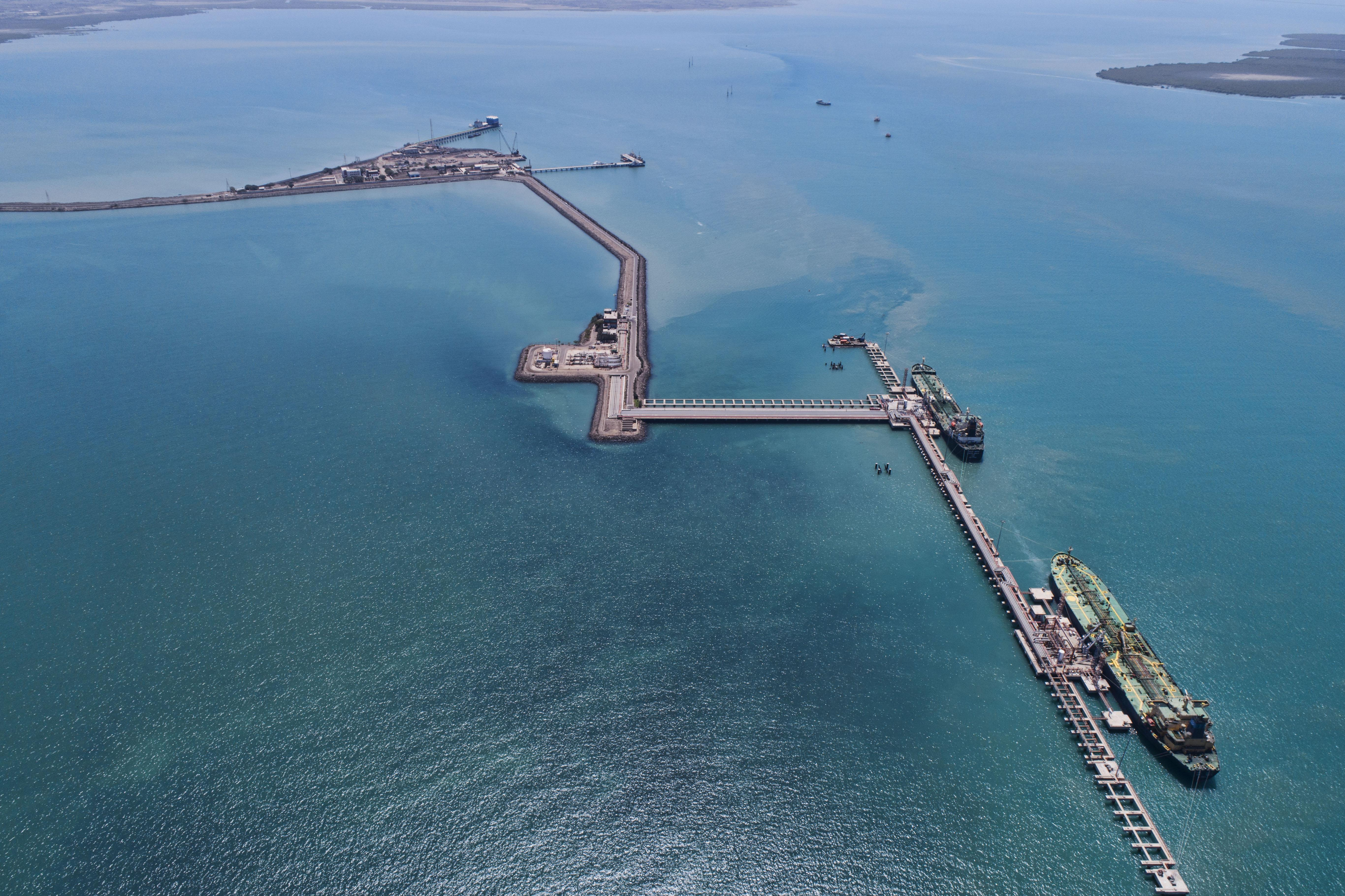
Nayara Energy Port at Vadinar, Gujarat

== See also ==
- Rosneft
- United Capital Partners
- Vadinar Refinery
- Essar Group
