= Vadinar Refinery =

Oil refinery at Vadinar in Gujarat, India

- Location within Gujarat Location within India
- Location: Vadinar, Devbhumi Dwarka, Gujarat, India; 22°19′54″N 69°44′50″E

Refinery details
- Owner: Nayara Energy Limited (Rosneft owns 49.13%)
- Opened: 2006
- Capacity: 405,000 barrels per day (64,400 m^{3}/d)
- Complexity index: 11.8
- No. of employees: 1,600

The Vadinar Refinery is an oil refinery at Vadinar, Gujarat, India. It is owned and operated by Nayara Energy Limited, in which Rosneft owns a 49.13% stake. The refinery is India's second largest single-location refinery, with an annual capacity of 20 million tonnes (405,000 barrels per day) and a complexity of 11.8, which also makes it among the world's most complex refineries.

== History ==
Construction of the refinery started in 1996 by Essar Oil. The refinery project was delayed several times due to environmental concerns and financial problems, including initial cost overruns and a shortfall in equity contributions. In 1998, when the refinery was 60% complete, a cyclone struck the plant and caused considerable damage. Construction was restarted in 2005, and the refinery was completed in 2006. It cost US$2.14 billion.

In May 2008, Essar Oil reported commercial production of 10.5 million tonnes per annum (mtpa). The units commissioned in the first phase were the CDU, VDU, sulfur gas unit, naphtha hydrotreater, catalytic cracker, and Vis breaker. The fluid catalytic cracker and a diesel hydro desulphurize were commissioned in November 2006. The FCC and DHDS plants were modified to be compliant with the cleaner Euro III and Euro IV fuels. The refinery configuration lends itself well to de-bottlenecking and its capacity is enhanced to 14 mtpa in 2009. The docking facilities include an SBM capable of handling vessels up to 350,000DWT with a capacity of 25mtpa, tankages with interconnecting pipelines of 20mtpa capacity, marine product dispatch capacity of 12mtpa, and railcar and truck-loading facilities.

In 2012, the refinery was expanded to a capacity of 20 a million tonnes per annum. Essar Oil announced the completion of the Rs8,300-crore expansion with the commissioning of the final Delayed Coker unit (DCU), which is amongst the world's largest.

== Description ==
The capacity expansion and complexity enhancement give the capability to process much heavier crude oil. The share of ultra heavy crude, which currently constitutes 20% of crude basket, will go up to 60%; and as a result, the overall share of heavy and ultra heavy crude will go up to 80% of the refinery's total crude basket.

In terms of product yield, the refinery has the flexibility to produce higher value, high-quality products, including gasoline (petrol) and gas oil (diesel) conforming to Euro IV and Euro V norms, that have growing acceptance in both domestic and international markets. Close to 80% of its production will now be of valuable light and middle distillates; and 50% of the production of gas oil (diesel) and gasoline (petrol) will meet Euro IV and Euro V specifications. EOL is targeting newer markets such as Australia, New Zealand and north-west Europe, in addition to countries in the Indian subcontinent for exporting high-quality fuels. However, Essar Oil will continue to market a majority of its products in the domestic market.

The Vadinar Refinery's infrastructure include a port, pipelines, tankage, and a captive coal-fired power plant that supplies power and process steam. The facility is equipped to dispatch products via rail, road and sea.

== Incidents ==
In Feb 2007, four workers were killed and at least 18 others were injured after a fire broke out at the oil terminal when it was running under the ownership of Essar Oil.
