= Vadinar =

Coastal town in Dwaraka, Gujarat

Vadinar વાડીનાર
- village
- Location in Gujarat, India Vadinar (India)
- Coordinates: 22.40°N 69.72°E
- Country: India
- State: Gujarat
- District: Devbhoomi Dwarka

Population
  - Total: 10,000

Languages
  - Official: Gujarati, Hindi
- Time zone: UTC+5:30 (IST)
- PIN: 361010
- Telephone code: 02833
- Vehicle registration: GJ-37
- Nearest city: Khambhaliya/Jamnagar
- Website: gujaratindia.com

Vadinar is small coastal town located in Devbhumi Dwarka district of the state of Gujarat, India. The offshore oil terminal of the Deendayal Port Trust is located in Vadinar and contributes in a large way to the total earnings of this major port. Vadinar is now notable due to the presence of two refineries which are close by - one promoted by Reliance Industries and the other by Essar Oil Ltd. A salt production unit is located in Vadinar. The famous Narara Island, which is part of Marine National Park, is situated 7 kilometers away from the town. Jellyfish, starfish, crabs, sea turtle and many endangered species can be found there. Two single-buoy moorings (SBM) of the Deendayal Port Trust offshore oil terminal of the Indian Oil Corporation are located at this port along with a similar buoy of the Essar refinery. Indian Oil Corporation crude oil terminal is also located at Vadinar. it is secured by CISF along with KPT Port. The nearest airport is at Jamnagar 47 km away.

At Zakhar there is a temple of Shiva named Jundeshwar Mahadev.

Also, at Vadinar is the COT (crude oil terminal) of the Bharat Oman Refineries Limited (BORL) refinery that is situated in BINA in Madhya Pradesh.
