= Puthuvype =

- Neighborhood
- Interactive map of Puthuvype
- Coordinates: 9.977°N 76.226°E
- Country: India
- State: Kerala
- District: Ernakulam

Government
  - Body: Elamkunnapuzha

Population (2011)
  - Total: 23,717

Languages
  - Official: Malayalam, English
- Time zone: UTC+5:30 (IST)
- PIN: 682 508
- Telephone code: 0484
- Vehicle registration: KL-07, KL-42
- Lok Sabha constituency: Ernakulam
- Vidhan Sabha constituency: Vypin
- Civic agency: Elamkunnapuzha

Puthuvype (Puthu vype - New Vypin) is an upcoming major industrial area in Kochi in the Indian state of Kerala. It is situated 5 km west of High Court Junction.

== Demographics ==
Religion in Puthuvype
| Religion | Percentage |
| Hindu | 52.95% |
| Christians | 37.47% |
| Muslims | 9.40% |
| Others | 0.18% |

As per the Government of India Census 2011, Puthuvype has a population of nearly 23,717 people. Males constitute 48.88% of the population and females 51.12%.

== Location and Surroundings ==
Puthuvype is a part of Vypin Island. It borders Vembanad Lake to the East, Arabian Sea to the West and South and Njarakkal to the North. The main thoroughfares in the area are Vypin-Munambam Road and LNG Terminal Road. It is one of the important place in Vypin Island. Puthuvype is well known for Puthuvype Light house beach.

== Industries ==
Industries located in Puthuvypeen are mainly related to natural regasification projects and petroleum projects.

- LNG Terminal

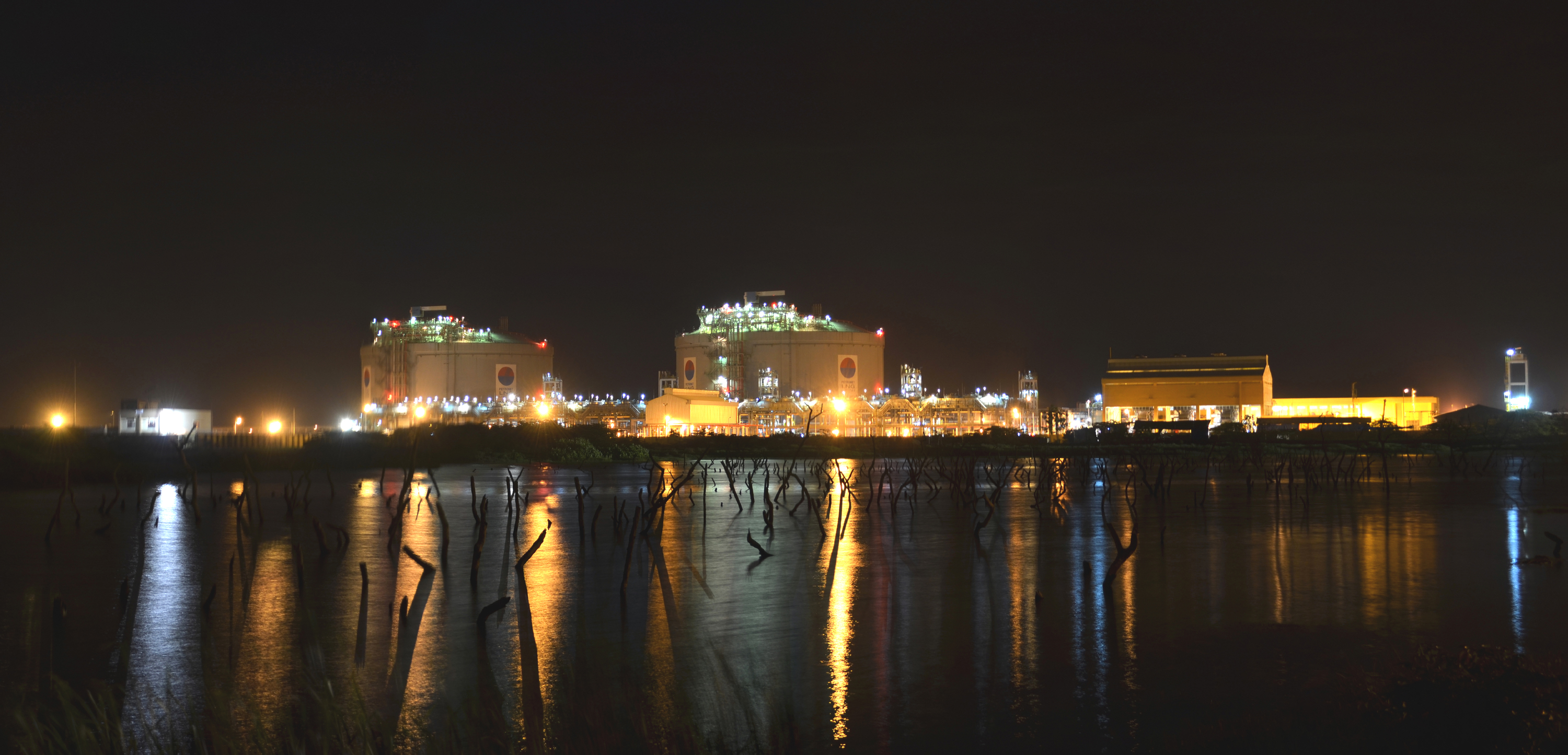
LNG Terminal at Puthuvype

The Kochi LNG Terminal of Petronet LNG Ltd is the first LNG terminal in southern India and the fourth LNG terminal of country.

The Project is a Greenfield LNG Re-gasification terminal at Puthuvype Special Economic Zone (SEZ) on land allotted by the Kochi Port Trust. The terminal has a capacity of 5 million tonnes per year.

- Single Buoy Mooring

It is a loading buoy anchored offshore that serves as a mooring point and interconnect for tankers loading or offloading petroleum products. It is operated by Kochi Refineries Ltd (KRL), a subsidiary of BPCL.

- Bunkering Terminal

An international bunkering terminal to supply fuel for vessels is planned by Cochin Port Trust. Bunkering industry point out that major transhipment trade is going to shift to Kochi from Colombo with the commissioning of the ICTT in January 2011. This will in turn attract a higher volume of vessel traffic including a greater number of coastal feeder vessels. Besides, the port’s strategic location given its close proximity to international sea route will attract mother vessels to Kochi. Construction works expected to start in mid-2011.

- Ship Repair Complex

Cochin Port Trust also plans to build a Ship Repair Complex at Puthuvype.

== Tourism ==
- Puthuvype Beach

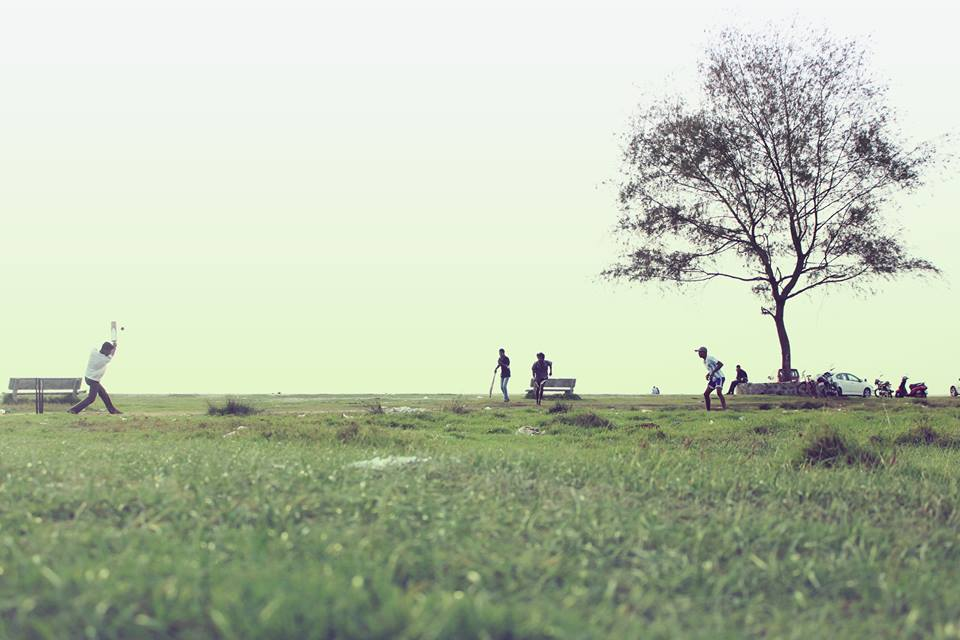
Cricket at Puthyvypin Beach

One of the less visited but yet very beautiful beach is the Puthuvype beach. This beach has not been developed for tourism and the local administration is making a lot of efforts to promote this place as an alternative to Cherai Beach, being a suburb of the city of Kochi. A lighthouse is also situated here. The light house is situated less than half a kilometer away from the beach. This lighthouse is one of the tallest in India. There is a shallow ditch to the north of the Beach. Entry to the light house is permitted from 3 P.M to 5 P.M.

- Mega Oceanarium

A Mega Oceanarium is coming up at PuthuVypeen, at an area of 65 acres with an investment of Rs.300 crores. This is the first Oceanarium of the country and will be largest in Asia.
