= Saeed bin Hamoud bin Saeed al Maawali =

Omani politician

- سعيد بن حمود بن سعيد المعولي
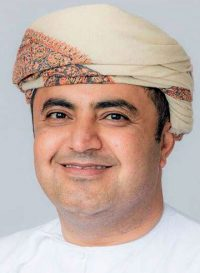

Minister of Transport, Communications and Information Technology
- Incumbent
- Assumed office 18 August 2020
- President: Haitham bin Tariq
- Prime Minister: Haitham bin Tariq

Personal details
- Education: Imperial College London (Bachelors)

Saeed bin Hamoud bin Saeed al Maawali (Arabic: سعيد بن حمود بن سعيد المعولي) is the Omani Minister of Transport, Communications and Information Technology. He was appointed as minister on 18 August 2020.

== Education ==
Al Maawali holds a bachelor in engineering from Imperial College in London.

== Career ==
Al Mawali has worked for Petroleum Development Oman, Occidental Petroleum Corporation, Sohar Aluminium, and Oman Oil Company. From 2014 until 2018, he was Executive Manager of the Oman Tank Terminal Company. In 2018, he was appointed chief executive officer of the Oman Drydock Company.

Since 18 August 2020, Al Mawali has been Minister of Minister of Transport, Communications and Information Technology.
