= Bharat Oman Refinery Limited =

Refinery owner in Madhya Pradesh, India

Bharat petroleum corporation Limited
- Type: government of India
- Industry: Oil and gas
- Founded: 1994; 32 years ago
- Founders: Bharat Petroleum; OQ
- Headquarters: Bina, Madhya Pradesh, India
- Key people: K. Padmakar (Chairman); Mahendra Pimpale (Managing Director)
- Products: LPG, Gasoline, Diesel, Aviation turbine fuel, Sulfur, Petcoke, Light aromatic naphtha
- Owner: Bharat Petroleum, Ministry of Petroleum and Natural Gas, Government of India
- Website: www.borl.in

Bharat Oman Refineries Limited (BORL) which is under the ownership of Ministry of Petroleum and Natural Gas of the government of India. It owns and operates Bina Refinery, located at Bina in the Sagar of the state of Madhya Pradesh in India. The company was incorporated as a joint venture between Bharat Petroleum Corporation (BPCL) and Oman Oil Company Ltd (now OQ). Since 2021, it is a wholly owned subsidiary of BPCL. The Bina Refinery was commissioned on 11 May 2011 with an annual capacity of 6 million tonnes. The capacity of the refinery was further enhanced to 7.8 million tonnes per year in 2018.

== History ==
Bharat Oman Refineries Limited (BORL) was incorporated in 1994 as a public limited company with equal equity participation of Bharat Petroleum and Oman Oil Company Ltd (now OQ). Work on the refinery at Bina however began only in 2006. The project faced significant delays on account of environmental clearances and poor infrastructure and suffered from severe cost overruns that saw its cost of establishment increasing from a budgeted ₹6,300 crore to ₹91 billion. Following these delays and cost overruns, the Omani company initially dropped out of the project but subsequently decided to be a minority stake holder in the project holding 26% equity. The refinery which was to have been commissioned in 2009 was finally inaugurated in May 2011 by Prime Minister Manmohan Singh. One percent of the plant's equity is held by the Government of Madhya Pradesh. The refinery is expected to create 5,000 jobs for Local peoples of district who comes to its criteria after then state so that they boost tax revenues for the state government.

== Capacity ==
The BORL refinery has a current installed capacity of processing 7.8 million tonnes of crude oil per annum (MTPA) or 156,000 barrels per day. The refinery also consists of a naphtha hydrotreater, a catalytic reformer to produce gasoline, a hydrocracker, a diesel hydrotreater and a delayed coker. The capacity at the refinery is to be augmented to 7.8 MTPA and is to reach a final capacity of 15 MTPA by 2022–23. Exports of naphtha from the refinery began in 2012. The plant is equipped to produce Euro III and Euro IV petroleum products and is capable of producing Euro V petroleum products with minimal additional investment.

== Pipelines ==
The Bina refinery uses a single point mooring system at Vadinar in Gujarat to facilitate the unloading of imported crude oil from large crude carriers. The crude is transported through a 935-km long pipeline from Vadinar to Bina. The products of the refinery are then transported through the 257- km Bina-Kota pipeline where it joins the Mumbai-Manmad-Bijwasan pipeline to reach the markets of North India.

== Consolidation ==
The government decided to consolidate the businesses of BPCL before privatization. On 31 March 2021, BPCL announced that it had signed an agreement to acquire a 36.6% stake held by OQ (formerly known as Oman Oil Company) for ₹2,400 crore (US$250 million) giving it complete control over Bharat Oman Refinery Limited.
