= Kochi LNG Terminal =

LNG terminal in India

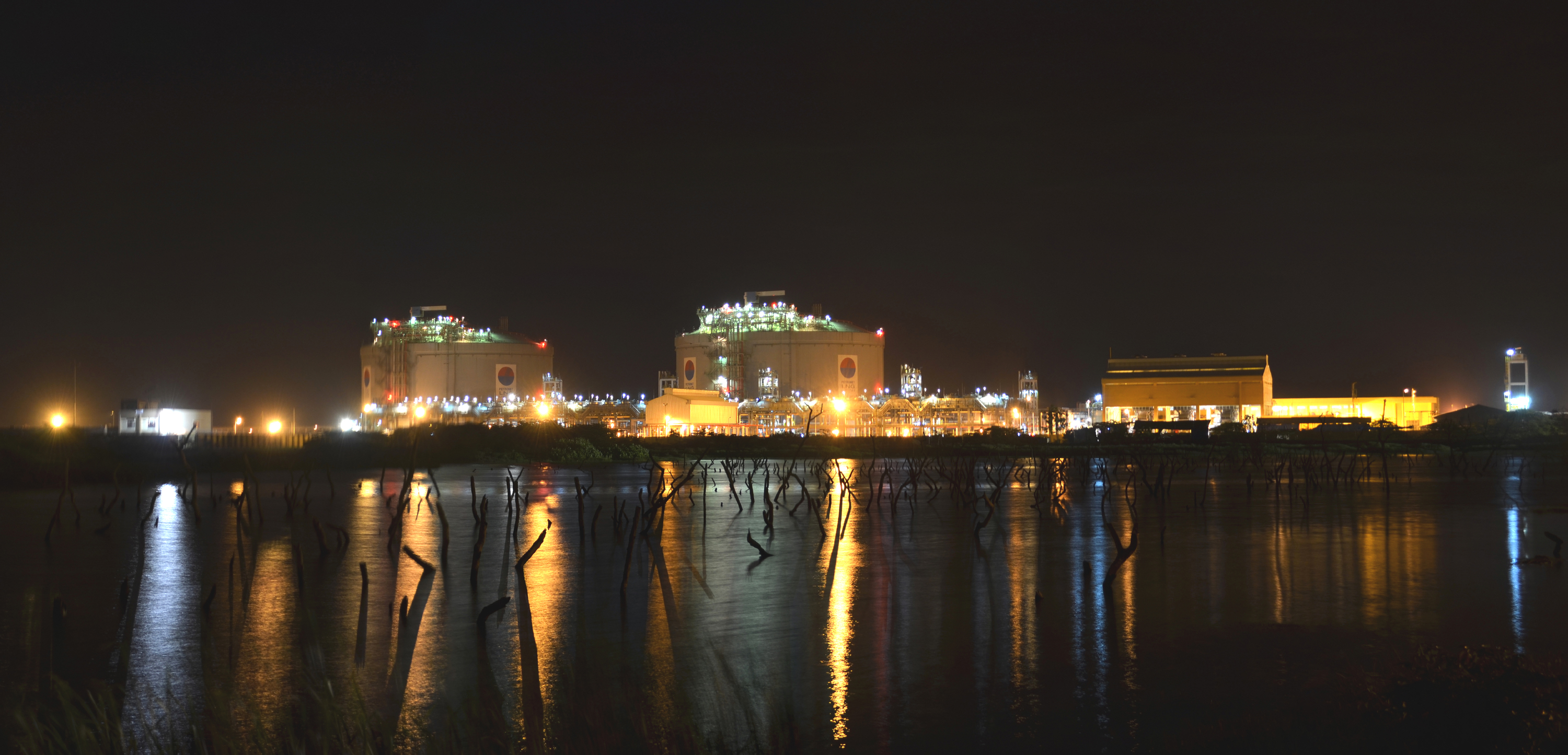
- Kochi LNG Terminal

General information
- Location: Puthuvype, Kochi
- Status: Completed
- Coordinates: 9.977°N 76.226°E
- Developer: Petronet LNG
- Construction start: 2007
- Commission: August, 2013
- Land area: 33.4 ha for storage and re-gasification terminal 23 ha for marine facilities

Technical details
- Capacity: 5 million tonnes per year
- Length: 300 m
- Draft: 12 m
- Website: Petronet LNG Limited

Kochi LNG is a liquefied natural gas (LNG) regasification terminal operated by Petronet LNG in Puthuvype, Kochi, India. The LNG terminal has been constructed and commissioned in August, 2013 at a cost of Rs.4,200 crores.

== General Information ==
The terminal has been developed by Petronet LNG having the capacity to store and distribute 5-million tonnes per annum. The terminal is currently operating at 8 percent capacity. The present customers are Fertilisers and Chemicals Travancore (FACT), Bharat Petroleum (BP) and Nitta Gelatin India Ltd. So far, two vessels carrying LNG had berthed at the terminal and had unloaded them. Petronet LNG gets the supply of 14.4 lakh tons of LNG per year for the Kochi terminal from the Gorgon project in Australia for a 20-year period as per the deal signed in August 2009.

== Location ==
The terminal is located in Puthuvype, around 12 km (7.5 mi) from the city centre.

== Facilities ==
- Marine Terminal to receive vessels up to 2,16,000 m^{3} capacity
- Facilities for storage, re-gasification and dispatch of gas.

== See also ==
- Kochi
- International Container Transshipment Terminal, Kochi
