= Bina Thermal Power Plant =

Coordinates: 24.317°N 78.128°E

Bina Thermal Power Plant is a coal-based thermal power station located in Bina Etawa, in the Sagar district of Madhya Pradesh. It is one of the coal based power plants of Jaypee Group. Current talks of this power plant being sold to Jindal owned JSW Energy are under progress.

== Capacity ==
Its installed capacity is 500 MW (2x250 MW).

Unit Number	Capacity (MW)	Date of Commissioning	Status
1	250	2012 August	Running.
2	250	2013 April	Running.
