= OQ (company) =

Omani energy company

- Type: Government-owned
- Industry: Oil and gas
- Founded: 2019
- Founder: Government of Oman
- Headquarters: Muscat, Oman
- Key people: Mulham Basheer Al Jarf (Chairman); Said Abdullah Al Hatmi (Deputy Chairman); Ashraf Hamed Al Mamari (Group CEO)
- Products: Polypropylene; polyethylene; intermediates; derivatives; refined products
- Owner: Government of Oman
- Website: oq.com

OQ, formerly known as Oman Oil Company, is an energy investment company headquartered in Muscat, Oman. It is a wholly owned subsidiary of the Government of Oman through the Oman Investment Authority state-owned enterprise.

OQ is involved in sectors such as infrastructure and transportation for energy, oil refining, petrochemical production, oil marketing, and power generating. It operates in 17 countries.

As of June 2023, OQ produces more than 246,000 barrels of oil per day.

== History ==
=== 1982 to 2000 ===
OQ was founded as the Oman Refinery Company in 1982.

In 1996, Oman Oil Company was established by the Government of Oman.

A separate company for gas, named Oman Gas Company, was established in 2000.

=== 2002 to 2010 ===
In 2003, Oman Oil Marketing Company (Oman Oil) was founded.

Oman Trading International, a trading division, was established in 2006.

Oman Refineries and Petrochemicals Co. was created in 2007 with the merger of Oman Refinery Company and Sohar Refinery Company.

In 2009, Oman Oil Company Exploration & Production was founded.

In 2010, the Programme Apple was initiated which aimed to integrate Oman Refineries and Petrochemicals Company, Oman Polypropylene Co., and Aromatics Oman Ltd. In the same year, Oman Oil Company signed a joint-venture with JBF Industries to erect a Terephthalic acid-PTA plant.

=== 2011 to 2020 ===
Following the initial phase of integration, Orpic was founded in 2011.

In 2013, OQ acquired a German-based company, Oxea.

OOC signed an exploration and production agreement with BP in 2013, to further develop the Khazzan-Makarem gas field.

In 2014, construction of the Sohar Refinery Improvement Project started.

In 2016, OOC secured a $4 billion loan to invest into various projects over the coming years. In the following year OOC signed a memorandum of understanding with Spain's Eni.

In 2017, a joint venture between Kuwait Petroleum International and OQ was announced for the development of Duqm Refinery & Petrochemical Complex. In the same year, OQ's subsidiary, Oman Tank Terminal Company (OTTCO), began construction of a crude oil storage terminal near Raz Markaz.

In 2018, Oman Oil Company sold 10% of its 40% stake in the Khazzan gas field to Malaysia's Petronas and signed two concessions/agreements with Occidental Petroleum (Oxy).

In November 2018, OOC announced that the company will be merged with refining company Orpic, which had been created in 2011 to operate Oman's downstream assets.

The NAKHLA programme was initiated in 2018. The construction of the Duqm Refinery began the same year, as did the groundwork for the Salalah LPG and Salalah Ammonia Projects.

Orpic Group merged with Oman Oil Company in 2019, and the combined business was given the moniker OQ. OQ is an acronym for "Opportunity and Quality."

In 2019, Oman Gas Company was incorporated into the OQ brand and was renamed OQ Gas Networks (OQGN).

In January 2020, the State Budget allocated funds to assist OQ Subsidiary, Oman Tank Terminal Company (OTTCO), with the Ras Markaz crude oil storage terminal that would become an international storage hub and strategically locate Oman in the Indian Ocean. Funds were also placed from the budget into the Liwa Plastic Industries Complex, a OQ investment. In May 2020, the commissioning phase commenced.

Production increases were planned for OQC in Germany for 2021. The OQ announced in May 2020 the intention to add 30% total production for the coming year.

In June 2020, Oxea was fully integrated into a group of eight other companies to create OQ, after the full process had begun in 2018.

In August 2020, OQ and the Ministry of Heritage and Tourism collaborated to announce the opening of a tourist centre at the archaeological site in the Wilayat of Al Dibba. The OQ also signed a Memorandum of Cooperation (MoC) with the Minister of Education and Jusoor Foundation to manage and run the Liwa Science and Innovation Center.

=== 2021 to present ===
In January 2021, Group CEO of OQ, Musub al Mahrouqi submitted his resignation which would be effective as of March that year. In response, the Board of Directors appointed the position of GCEO to Talal bin Hamid al Awfi to take over the responsibilities starting immediately. Head of Procurement at OQ is Ahmed Al Azkawi.

OQ sold its stake in Bina refinery in March 2021, eventually giving its partner Bharat Petroleum Corporation Ltd. (BPCL) full control of BORL.

In September 2021, an announcement was made that OQ was considering sale of its German subsidiary, Oxea, a chemicals business, for about $3 billion.

In December 2021, Liwa Plastics Industries Complex (LPIC) project in Sohar was inaugurated. The work on the project started in May 2020. With two polyethylene facilities, it has the capacity to produce 880,000 tonnes of linear low-density polyethylene (LLDPE) and high-density polyethylene (HDPE) annually. OQ and TotalEnergies formed Marsa LNG, an integrated energy company, in December 2021, which began producing LNG from Block 10 in January 2023 with a 33.19% interest. Shell also signed a concession agreement to operate 53.45% of Block 10.

In May 2022, Trend Micro and OQ inked a Memorandum of Understanding (MOU), under which Trend Micro would secure OQ's digital infrastructure from cyber threats.

In July 2022, OQ signed an agreement with the Ministry of Higher Education, Research, and Innovation to fund the construction of vocational colleges with an allocation of OMR 200,000.

A contract for the exploration and development of natural gas resources in Block 11 was signed by OQ, Shell and TotalEnergies in September 2022. Shell has a 67.5% stake, OQ 10% and TotalEnergies 22.5%. The companies have previously signed a similar agreement for neighbouring Block 10.

In June 2023, OQ signed an agreement with DEME and Hydrom for the project development of Hyport Duqm for the engineering of 150 square metres and the construction of the renewable energy and downstream sites required for green hydrogen production and green ammonia plants.

In August 2023, OQ signed LNG supply agreements with Shell.

In October 2023, OQ Gas Networks IPO listing hit a record high and was the third largest listed company on the MSX. The IPO was oversubscribed about 14 times and investors bought 2.1 billion shares, a 49% stake, raising OMR 288 million.

In February 2024, the OQ8 Duqm refinery was inaugurated. The refinery is a joint venture with Kuwait Petroleum International.

The OQ Exploration and Production (OQEP) raised $2 billion in October 2024 with the sale of about 2 billion shares amounting to 25% stake.

In November 2024, the OQ Base Industries (OQBI) made its initial public offering on the Muscat Stock Exchange raising $490 million.

In April 2025, all of OQ Chemicals was sold to European-based investment firms Strategic Value Partners (SVP) and Blantyre Capital including all production sites in Germany and the United States.

The lenders' reliability test (LRT) was completed at the OQ8 Duqm refinery in April 2025, providing about $4 billion in shareholder guarantees for the stable transition into commercial operations.

== Operations ==
The OQ is invested into different main sectors through its network of subsidiaries. These include petrochemicals, refining and marketing, metal and mining and services.

OQ Company runs operations via four main subsidiaries:

- Takamul Investment Company S.A.O.C
  - Oman India Fertilizer Co. (OMIFCO)
  - Oman Oil Refineries and Petroleum Industries Company (ORPIC)
  - Salalah Methanol Co. (SMC)
  - Minerals Development Oman (MDO)
    - Innovation Development Oman Holding (IDO) [Shares transferred to OIA]
    - Vale Oman Pelletizing Company (Vale Oman)
    - Takatuf Oman
    - Sohar Aluminium Company (SAC)
- Oman Oil Company Exploration and Production
- Oman Oil Facilities Development Company L.L.C
- Oman Oil Duqm Development L.L.C

The companies international assets are under direct control of the OOC, which has an international investment unit. These include:

- Blackrock Metals Company – Canada (2.8%)
- MOL – Hungary (7%)
- Redes Energéticas Nacionais (REN) – Portugal (15%)
- Oman Trading International (OTI) – UAE (70%)
- Gulf Energy Maritime (GEM) – UAE (30.4%)
- Orient Power Company Limited (OPCL) – Pakistan (42.8%)
- Planta de Regasification de Sagunto (Saggas) – Spain (7.5%)
- Qingdao Lidong Chemical Ltd. – China (30%)
- GS Electric Power Solution (GS EPS) – South Korea (30%)
- Qingdao Lixing Logistics – China (30%)
- Compañia Logística de Hidrocaburos S.A (CLH) – Spain (10%)

== See also ==
- Energy in Oman
