= Vypin Lighthouse =

Lighthouse in Kerala, India

Vypin Lighthouse Cochin Lighthouse
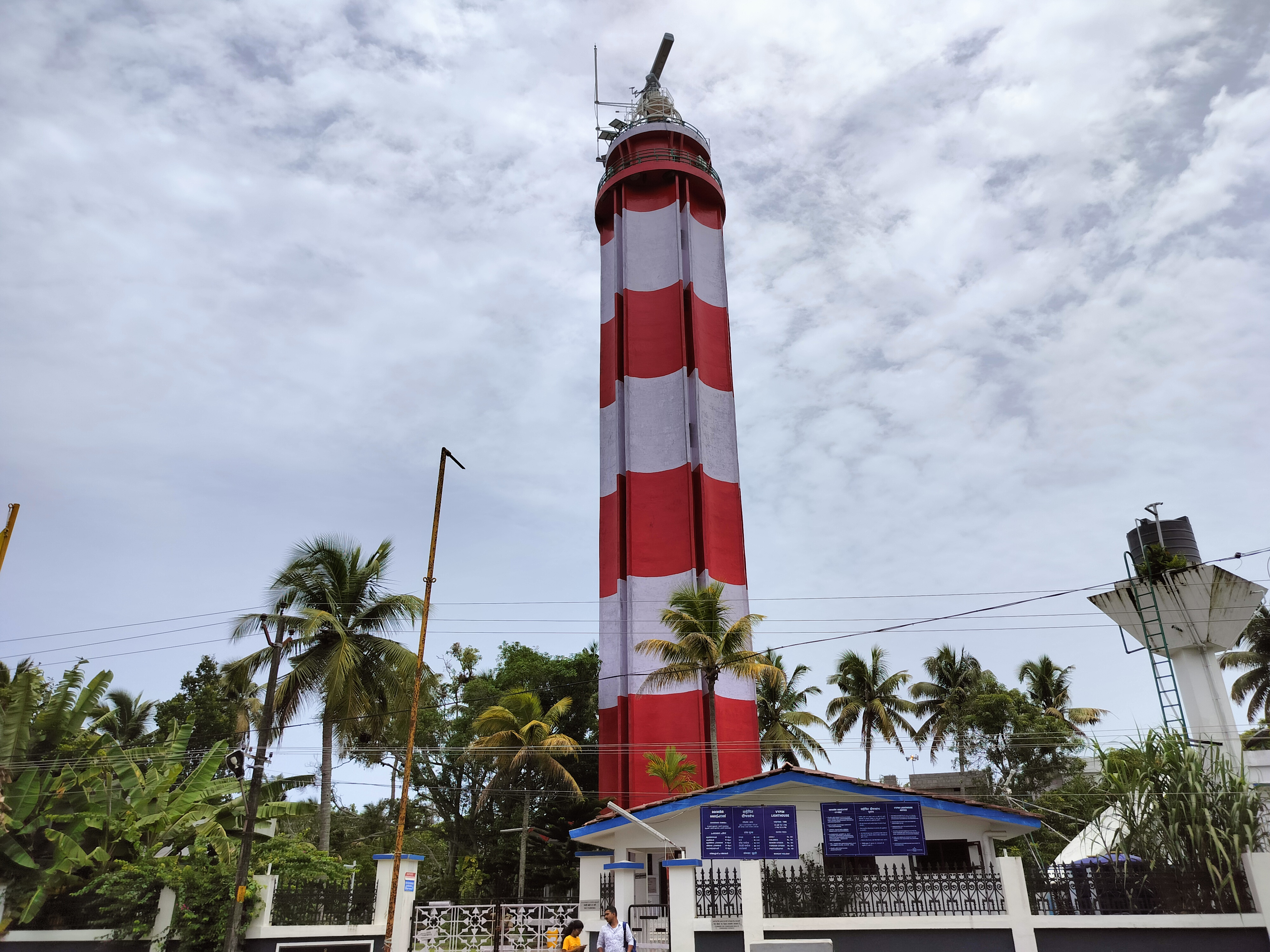
- The lighthouse in 2023
- Location: Puthuvype, Kochi, Kerala; India
- Coordinates: 9°59′54″N 76°13′18″E

Tower
- Constructed: 1839 (first)
- Construction: concrete tower
- Height: 46 metres (151 ft)
- Shape: octagonal tower with balcony and lantern
- Markings: white and red horizontal bands, white lantern

Light
- First lit: 1979 (current)
- Focal height: 49 metres (161 ft)
- Range: 28 nautical miles (52 km; 32 mi)
- Characteristic: Fl (4) W 20s.

The Vypin Lighthouse or Cochin Lighthouse is an active lighthouse situated at Puthuvype in Kochi, Kerala, India. It started as an oil-fuelled lamp at Fort Kochi in 1839, and was updated over the years. It was replaced by a structure in Puthuvype in 1979. It is the tallest lighthouse in Kerala.

The lighthouse, near Putuvype beach, is open to visitors.

== Technical details ==
The tower is 46 metres (151 ft) high, and is made of double-layered concrete. The light beam is visible at 28 nautical miles (52 km; 32 mi).

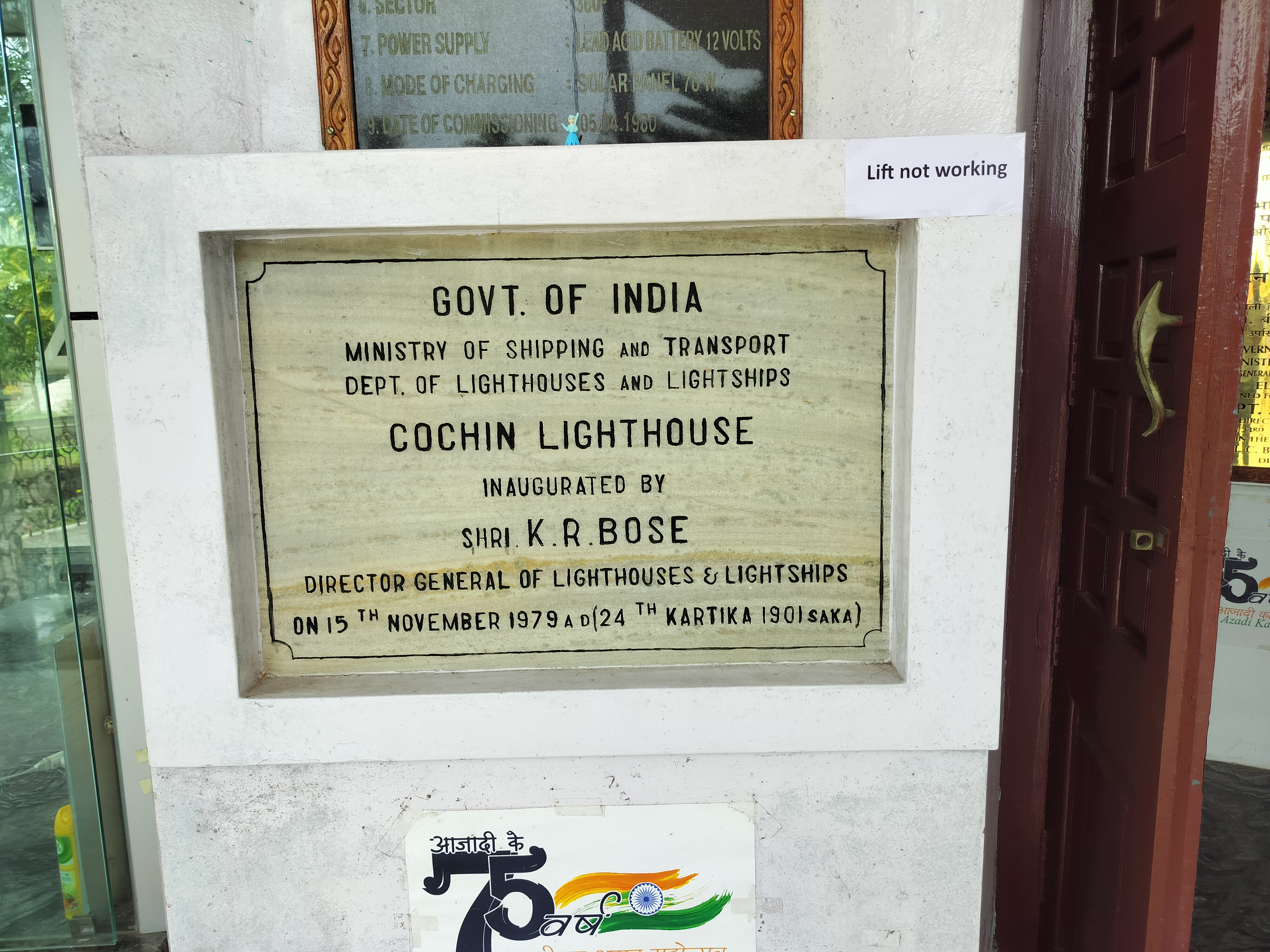
Plaq on Lighthouse Building

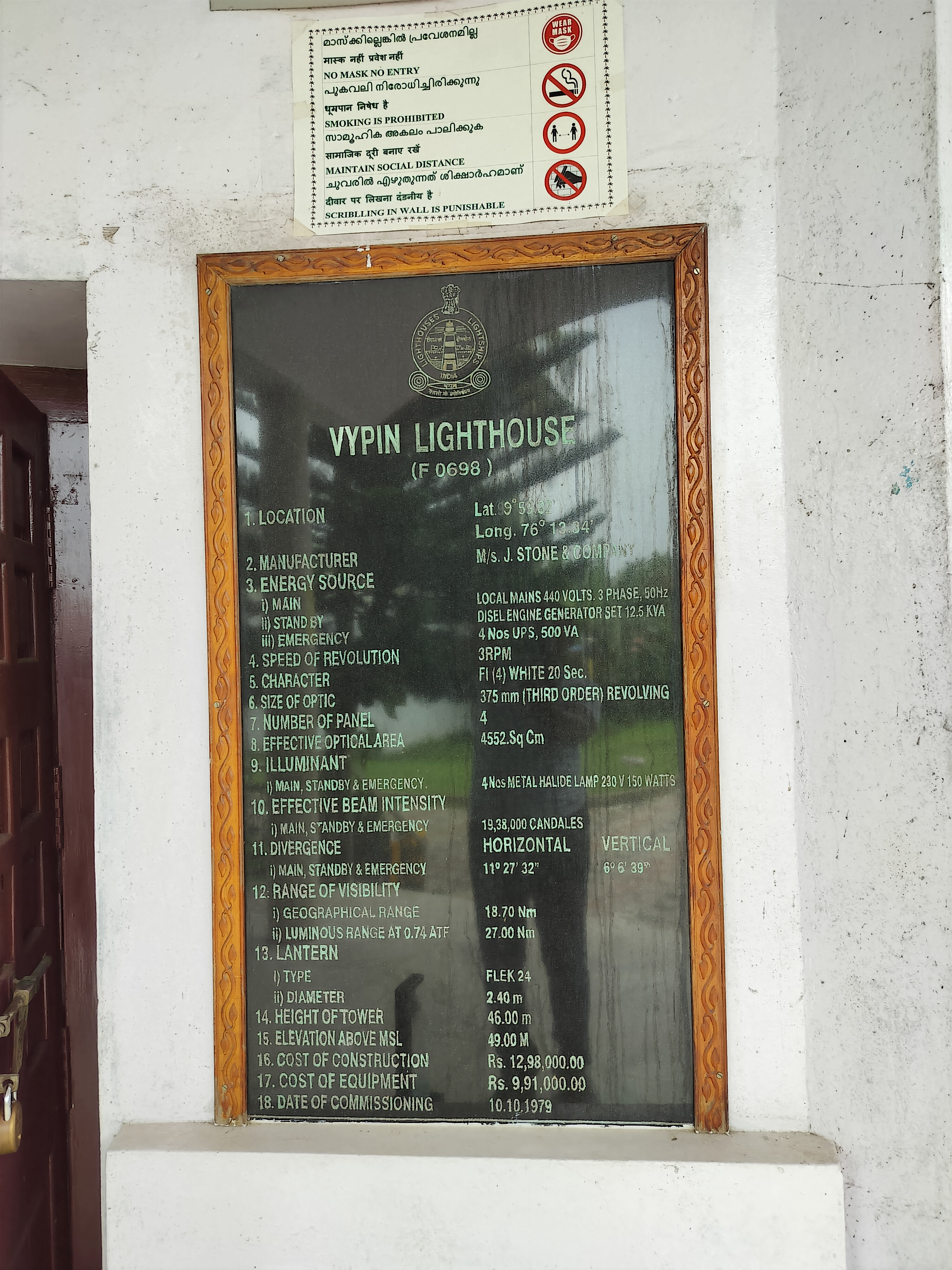
Details of Lighthouse

== History ==
An oil lamp light started functioning at Fort Kochi in 1839. In 1902, a new light and reflecting mechanism was introduced. Modifications were made in 1914. In the 1920s, a new 10-meter tall tower was erected.

In 1936, a 25-meter-tall steel tower was installed with a gaslight. In 1966, a mechanism called sun valve was introduced. Plans to construct a taller and brighter light and a radio beacon were drawn up. Since there was a paucity of land, the new light was transferred to Puthuvype on the Vypin Island and the radio beacon was shifted to Azhikode.

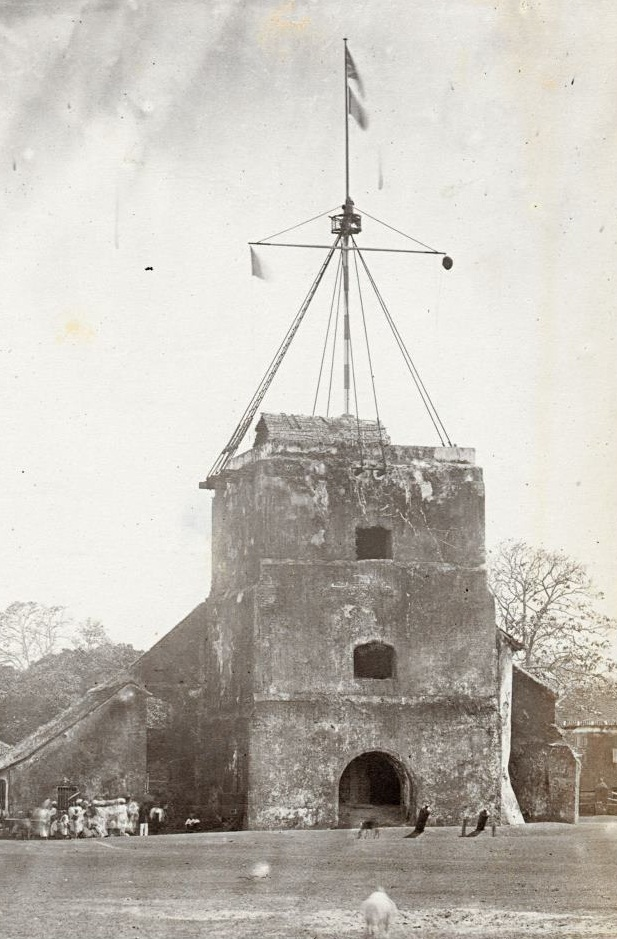
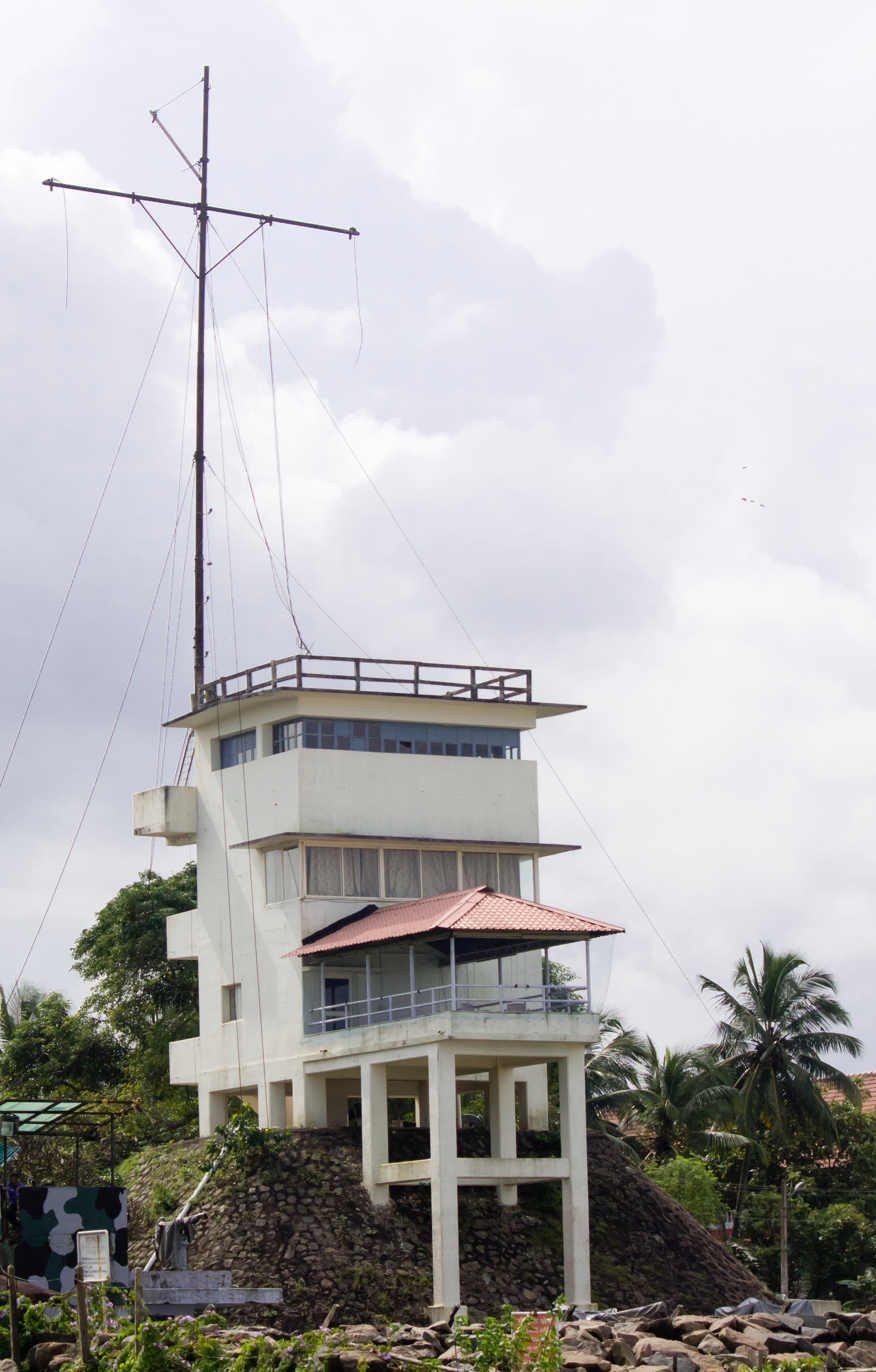
Left: the Fort Kochi Lighthouse, between 1850 and 1897. Right: the structure in 2013.

== Gallery ==
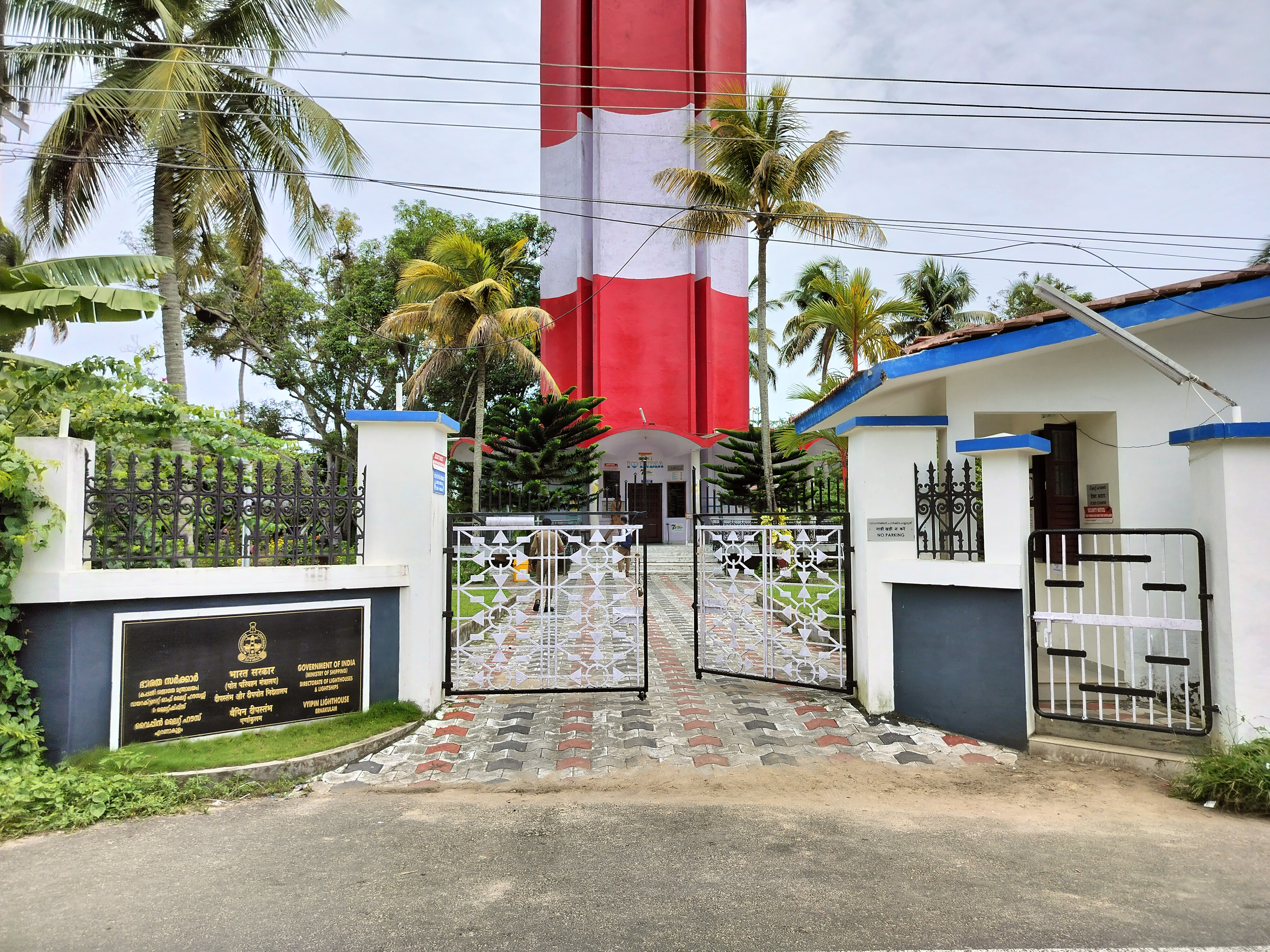
Gate

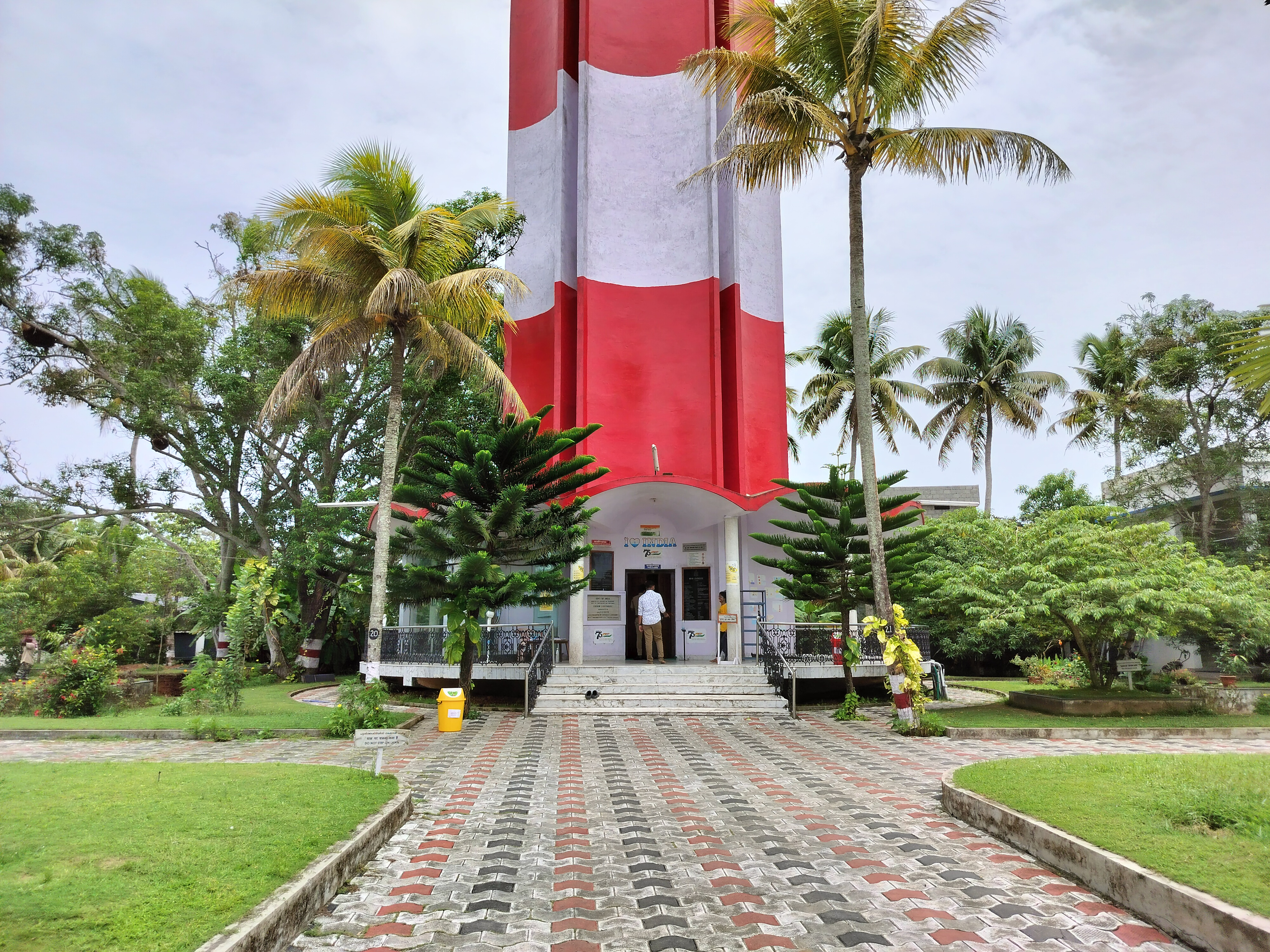
Lower part

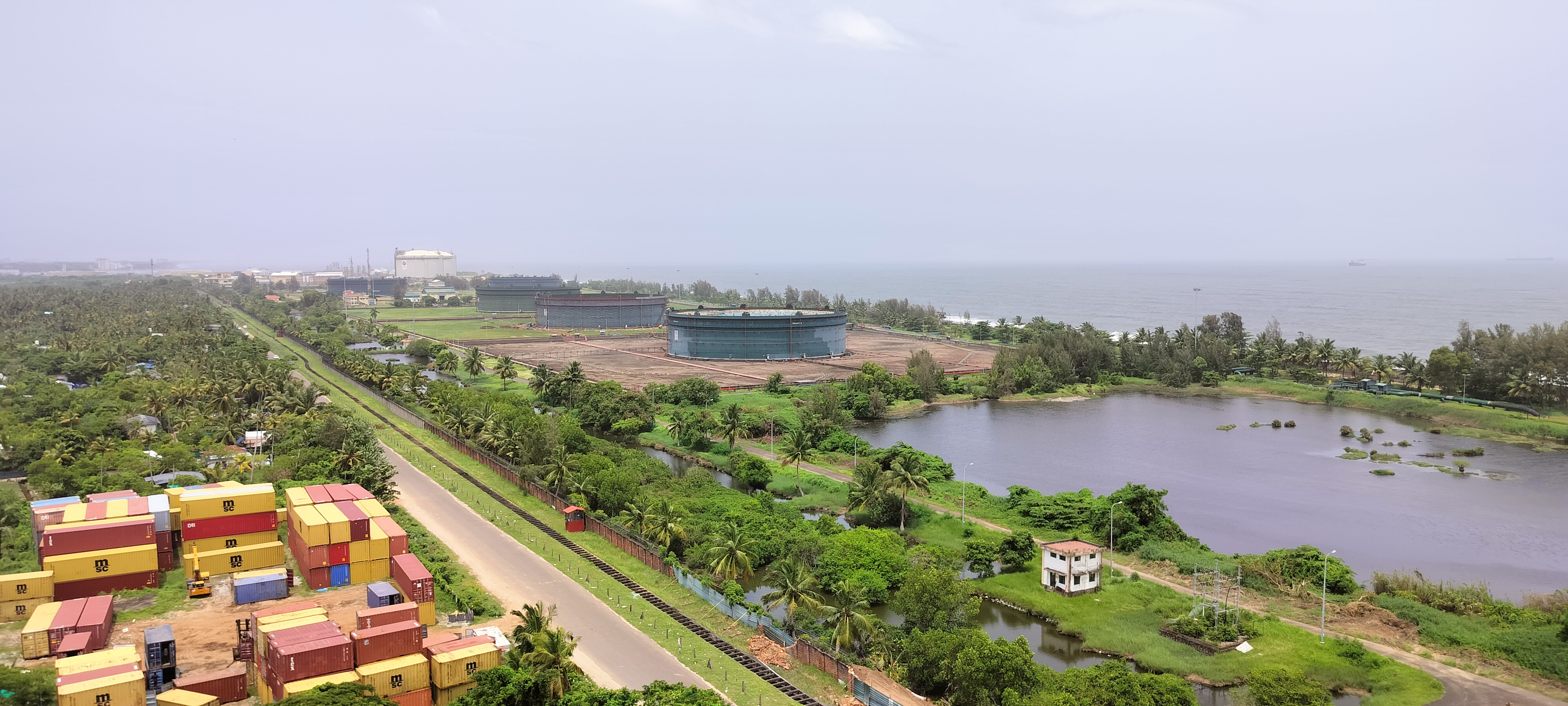
View from Vypin lighthouse

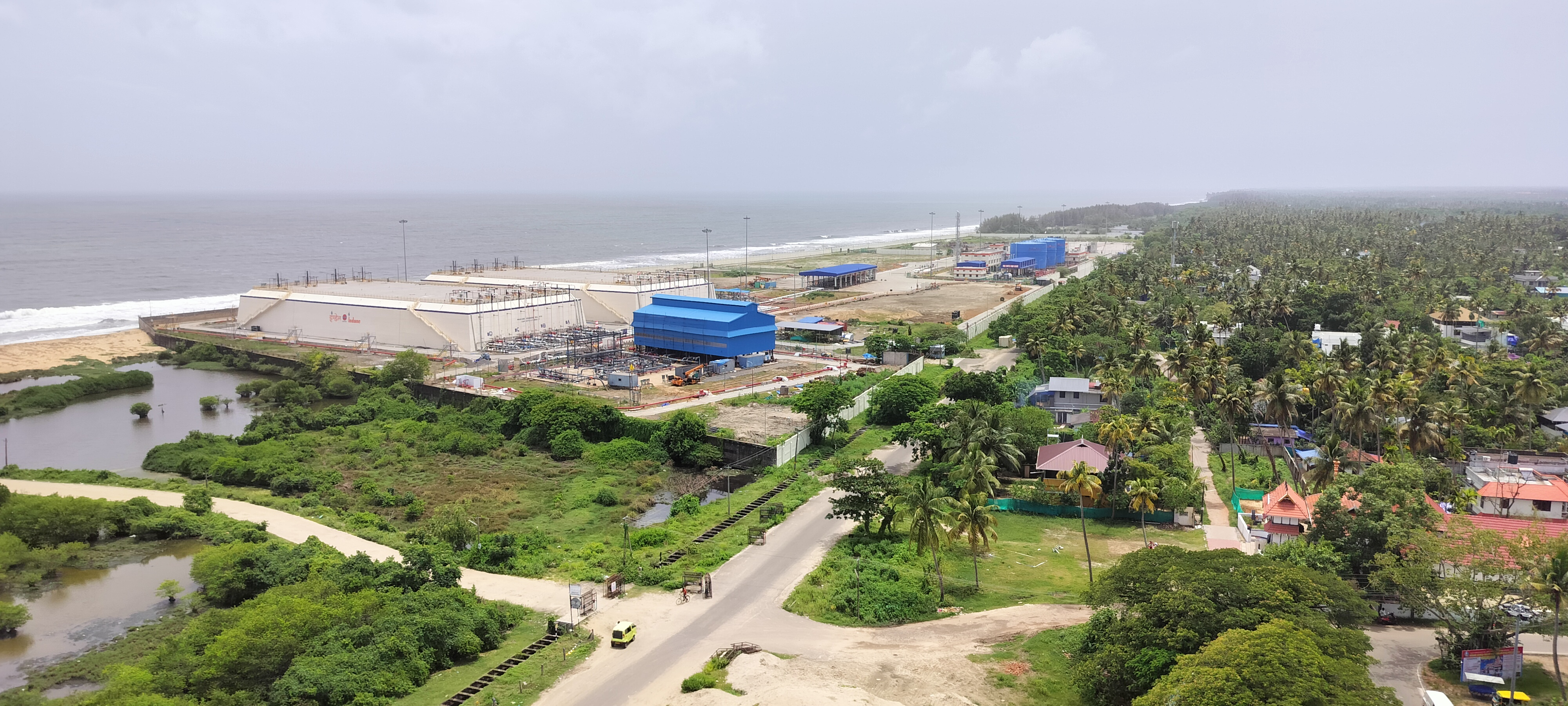
View from Vypin lighthouse

Plaque in Vypin lighthouse

Map of Cochin lighthouse district

== See also ==
- List of lighthouses in India
