= Khazzan-Makarem gas field =

Gas field in Oman

British Petroleum Khazzan-Makarem
- Location within Oman
- Country: Oman
- Region: Ad Dhahirah Governorate
- Block: 61
- Offshore/onshore: onshore
- Coordinates: 23.21618°N 56.49078°E
- Operator: BP
- Partners: OOCEP
- Service contractors: Worley, Galfar, STS, GPS, TOCO, CCC

Field history
- Discovery: 2000
- Start of development: 2004
- Start of production: 2017

Production
- Estimated gas in place: 2.8×10^{12} m^{3} 100×10^{12} cu ft

The British Petroleum Khazzan-Makarem gas field is a tight (Low Permeability) natural gas field located in the Ad Dhahirah Governorate Oman. It was discovered in 2000 and developed by BP. It began production in 2017 and produces natural gas and condensates. The total proven reserves of the Khazzan-Makarem gas field are around 100 trillion cubic feet (2.8 trillion m^{3}), and production is slated to be around 1.2 billion cubic feet/day (3.42 million m^{3}).

The field ownership is split with 60% owned by BP and 40% owned by Oman Oil. In 2016, BP signed an agreement with the Government of the Sultanate of Oman to amend the Oman Block 61 exploration and production sharing agreement (EPSA). This added a further 1,150km2 to the south and west of the original 2,800km2 Block 61 development, allowing a second phase of development, known as Ghazeer. This addition is expected to increase production to around 1.5 billion cubic feet/day and increases the total number of wells to about 300 over the lifetime of the field.

PETRONAS, through its subsidiary PC Oman Ventures Ltd acquired a 10% participation interest in the field from Oman Oil (now known as OQ) in December 2018. With the acquisition, the field ownership is now split with 60% owned by BP, 30% by OQ and 10% by PETRONAS.

Production from the EPSA extension area (Ghazeer) commences in October 2020.
