= Ministry of Transport, Communications and Information Technology (Oman) =

Added a ministry in Oman established in 2019

Coordinates: 23°35′45″N 58°33′3″E

Sultanate of Oman Ministry of Transport, Communications and Information Technology
- وزارة النقل والاتصالات وتقنية المعلومات
- National emblem of Oman

Agency overview
- Jurisdiction: Government of Oman
- Headquarters: Muscat (Oman)
- Agency executive: H.E Eng. Saeed Bin Hamoud Al-Mawali, Minister
- Website: www.ita.gov.om

The Ministry of Transport, Communications and Information Technology is the governmental body in the Sultanate of Oman responsible for all matters relating to infrastructure, including airports and ports, transport, logistics, communications, and information technology. The Ministry was established on 18 August 2020 by Royal Decree No. 90/2020, through the merger of the Ministry of Transport and the Ministry of Technology and Communications.

The Ministry is also responsible for introducing and executing E-Government strategy in the Sultanate of Oman.

Directorates and other centers within The Ministry of Transport, Communications and Information Technology:

- The Directorate General of Policies & Governance
- The Directorate General of Infrastructure and Digital Platforms
- The Directorate General of Sector stimulation and Future skills
- The Directorate General of Digital transformation and Sectors empowerment
- The National Center for Space and Advance Technology
- AI and Oman CERT
