= Hyport Duqm =

Hyport Duqm is an Omani-Belgian initiative.

It is a large-scale green hydrogen and green ammonia production initiative situated within the Special Economic Zone at Duqm (SEZAD) on the southeastern coast of Oman. Developed as a collaborative enterprise involving Oman's state-owned energy entity OQ, Belgian engineering firm DEME Concessions, and global energy major bp, the project is a part of Oman's national clean energy strategy. The facility spans a vast desert area utilizing dedicated regional solar and wind energy installations to power utility-scale water electrolyzers. By converting clean electricity into green hydrogen and processing it into green ammonia as a stable carrier, the venture aims to leverage the Port of Duqm to supply international clean energy markets, particularly in Europe, supporting broader global decarbonization and economic diversification goals.
