= Bina, Madhya Pradesh =

Bina Bina-Etawa, Etawa
- City
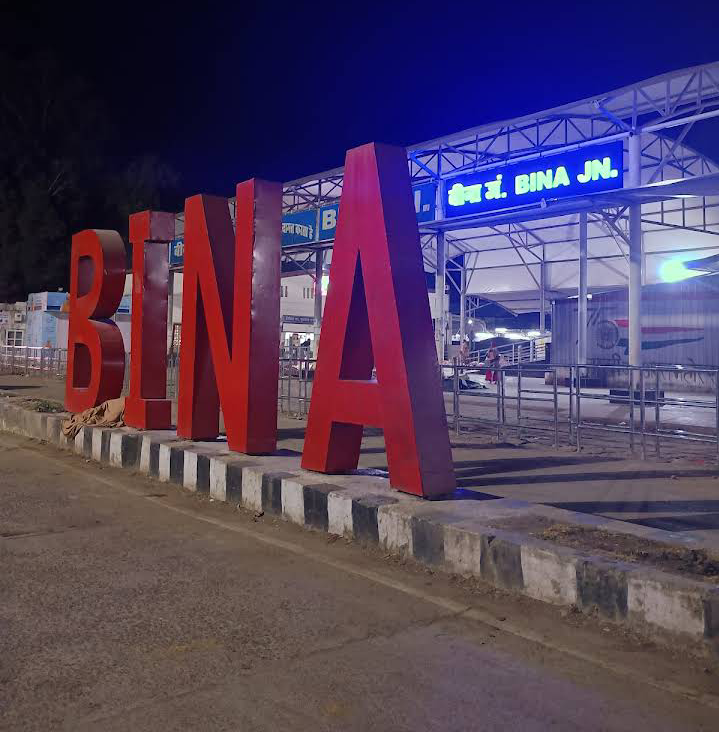
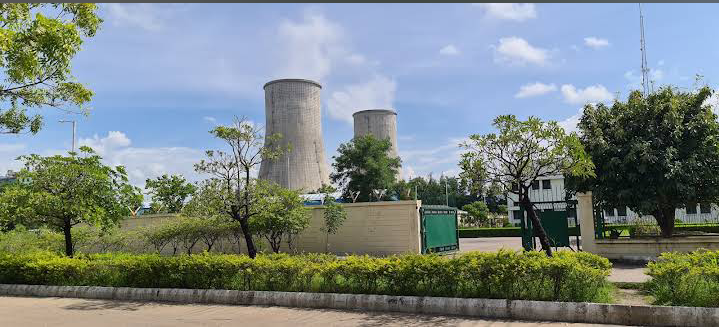
- top: Bina Junction Railway Station, bottom: JP Bina Thermal Plant

- Location in Madhya Pradesh, India
- Coordinates: 24°10′48″N 78°12′0″E
- Country: India
- State: Madhya Pradesh
- Division: Bhopal division
- District: Bina -etawa District

Government
  - Body: Bina Nagar Palika Parishad

Area
  - Total: 64 km^{2} (25 sq mi)
  - Rank: 51
- Elevation: 412 m (1,352 ft)

Population (2024)
  - Total: 402,678
  - Density: 5,377/km^{2} (13,930/sq mi)

Languages
  - Official: Hindi; Marwari; Malwi; Bundelkhandi; Punjabi; Sindhi
- Time zone: UTC+5:30 (IST)
- PIN: 470113,470118, 470124, 464240
- Vehicle registration: MP-15, MP-08, MP-40

Bina, formerly known as Bina-Etawa or Etawa, is a city in the Bina-etawa district of the Indian state of Madhya Pradesh . The city's name is derived from the Bina River, which flows near the city.

Bina is one of the fastest growing cities in Madhya Pradesh. It is a center of economic and industrial activity in the state. The city is home to the Bina Refinery, as well as the Jaypee Group's 500 MW Jaypee Bina Thermal plant . This region is also known for its high-quality wheat, which is reportedly exported internationally.

== Geography ==
Five rivers flow through the surrounding area. In addition to Bina River, they include:

- Motichur – location of the city's Katra temple
- Betwa – forms the border of the Bina and Ashoknagar districts
- Narayani – flows between Bina and Lalitpur
- Silar

Bina is close to the ancient city of Eran. Eran was the capital of Airikina Pradesha, an administrative division of the Gupta Empire. Bina sits between Bhopal and Jhansi, Uttar Pradesh. It is among the oldest cities in the region and the oldest in the state.

The Bina and Betwa Rivers are the major water sources.

== History ==
Bina was formerly known as Etawa, the name of an earlier village in the area. In 1923, the Bina Railway Junction was established, deriving it name from the river. The first Member of the Legislative Assembly of the Bina Assembly constituency was Ram Lal Nayak, elected in 1957. The name Bina-Etawa was unofficially used to remove any ambiguity between Itawah (located in Uttar Pradesh) and Etawa. Later, the city was officially renamed as Bina.

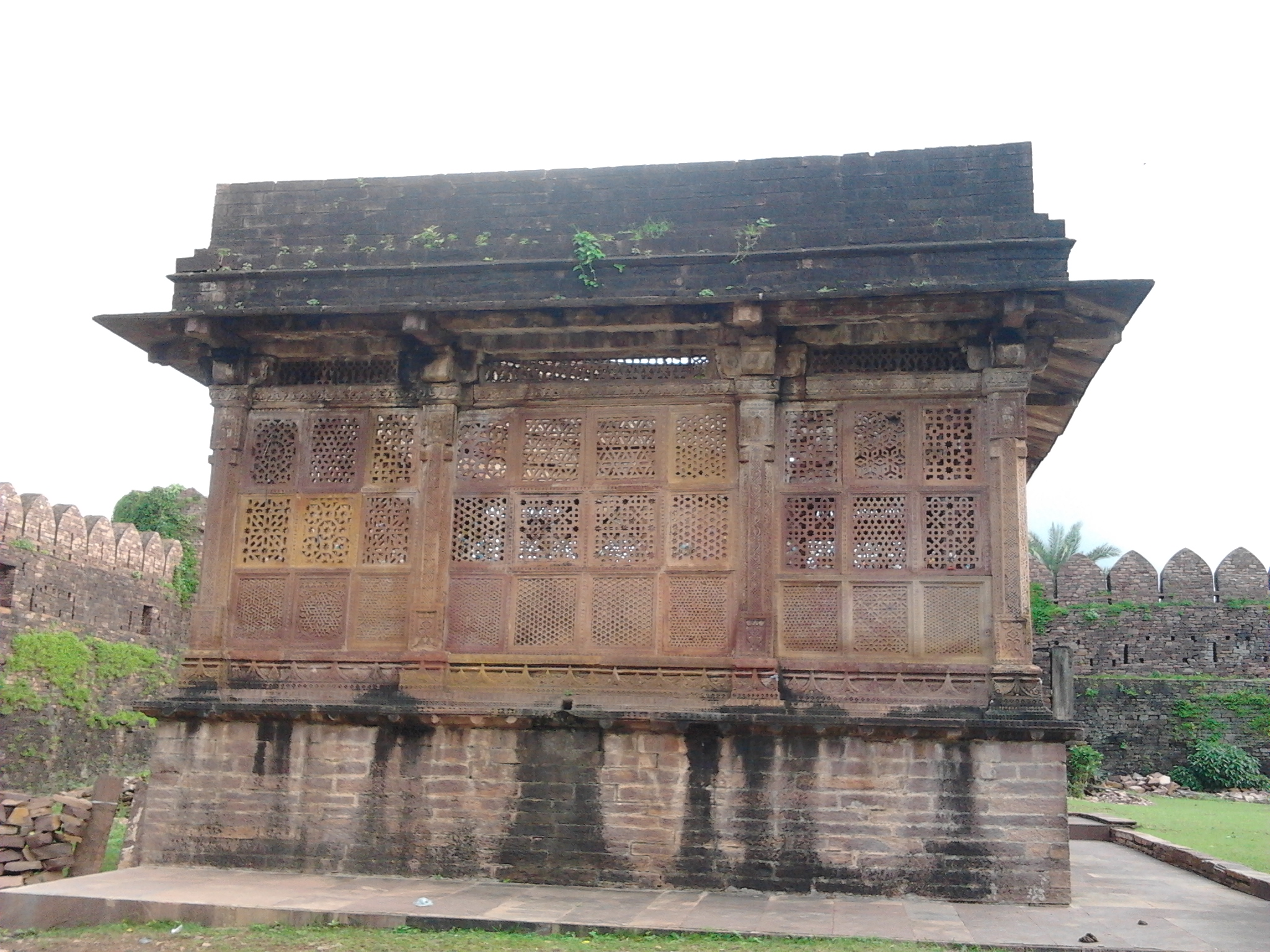
Khimlasa Bina

Located near the city, Khimlasa Fort is of historical interest. The fort is said to have been founded by a Mughal noble and was the Mahal (palace) in the Sarkar of Raisen of Malwa Subah. The town of Khimlasa is enclosed within a fortified wall built of stone rubble.

== Industry and economy ==
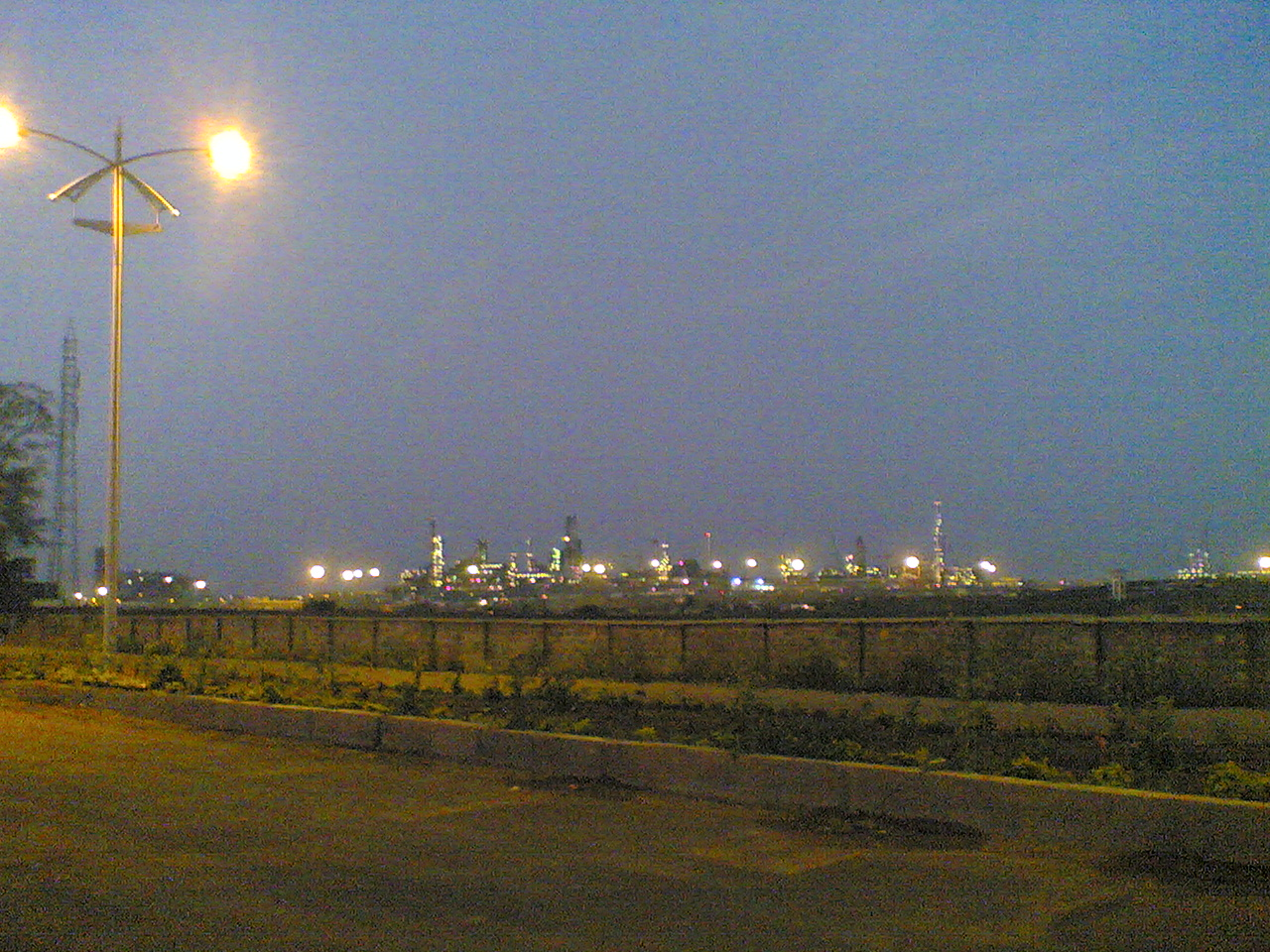
Bina Refinery

Bharat Oman Refinery Limited owns a major oil refinery near Bina, "the only petroleum refinery in Central India" with a capacity of 7.8 [billion tonnes per year. Bina Refinery is designed to process Arab crude oil (65% Arab light and 35% Arab heavy). It can process other crude oil. The project includes a coke-based cogeneration power plant of 99 MW (33 x 3).

Bina Thermal Power Plant (a.k.a JayPee Bina Thermal Power Plant) has two thermal units of 250 MW capacity one each of which were launched in 2012 and 2013. A section of the power plant currently operates with a capacity of 500 MW, although this will scale to 1200 MW when the plant reaches capacity. The Bina Thermal Power Plant is presently owned by Jaiprakash Power Ventures (JP Power), which company also plans to establish a 50 MW solar PV plant in the same premises, with an estimated investment of ₹300 crore. Also, the Power Grid Corporation of India (PGCIL) owns a 1200-KV test station in Bina that went operational in 2016.

The Madhya Pradesh regional government planned to build an investment corridor between Bina and Bhopal, naming it the Bina-Bhopal Investment Corridor. The project was expected to catalyze investment of around $1 billion to upgrade local industry, aiding the production of electrical equipment, fabricated metal, machinery, and equipment. Along with it, integrated township projects were proposed near the city. In a move toward achieving "Carbon Neutral" status by 2030, Bina's first solar power plant, was launched in 2020. It primarily powers trains and lighting at Bina Junction station. Presently generating 1.7 MW, it can be expanded to 20 GW capacity. A MEMU (mainline electric multiple unit) car shed for operating local and high-speed MEMU trains in Madhya Pradesh and neighbouring states was established in 2021 by the Bhopal railway division.

The region has agricultural produce processing units and agricultural machinery manufacturing plants and wheat cultivation. The agricultural land consists primarily of black soil.

Seven railway overbridges (ROBs) were to be constructed; four ROBs have been completed. Work is ongoing on the remaining three ROBs, as well as a 36 km long ring road. During the COVID-19 pandemic, a 1000-bed hospital was established in Bina near the refinery. Prime Minister Narendra Modi laid the foundation stone for the redevelopment of Bina Refinery with an investment of 50,000 crore rupees.

World's First Direct-to-Traction Plant: The Bina Solar Plant in Madhya Pradesh became the first solar facility globally to link directly to overhead railway lines, sending clean energy straight into the grid to move the trains themselves.

== Climate ==
The winter season lasts from November to February, and the summer season lasts from March to mid-June. The minimum recorded temperature is 1 °C in January. The maximum temperature is 48 °C. Average precipitation is around 1235 mm annually. In the monsoon season, the wind direction is from the southwest; in winter, the wind direction is from the northeast.

== Education ==
Bina has an average literacy rate of 73%, higher than the national average. It has two centers for higher education: a government college for post-graduate and graduate courses and a government girls' college providing graduate courses. A government law college was inaugurated near the city. Many private colleges for Bachelor of Education degrees and ITIs are operated in the city for students. A government ITI and a private nursing college in the city, and one private MBA college (GNIMR – Gomti Nandan Institute of Management and Research) offers courses in the city. Kendriya Vidyalaya and Nirmal Jyoti Senior Secondary School are two high schools in the region. Bina Public Higher Secondary School operates there. Three state government schools are there. Apart from that, one government model higher secondary school. Many private English-medium schools are there and a DAV higher secondary school is located at the refinery. The CBSE-affiliated Sardar Patel Higher Secondary School and a private ITI are located in the Jaypee Bina thermal plant premises and run by Jaypee Group.

== Religious sites ==
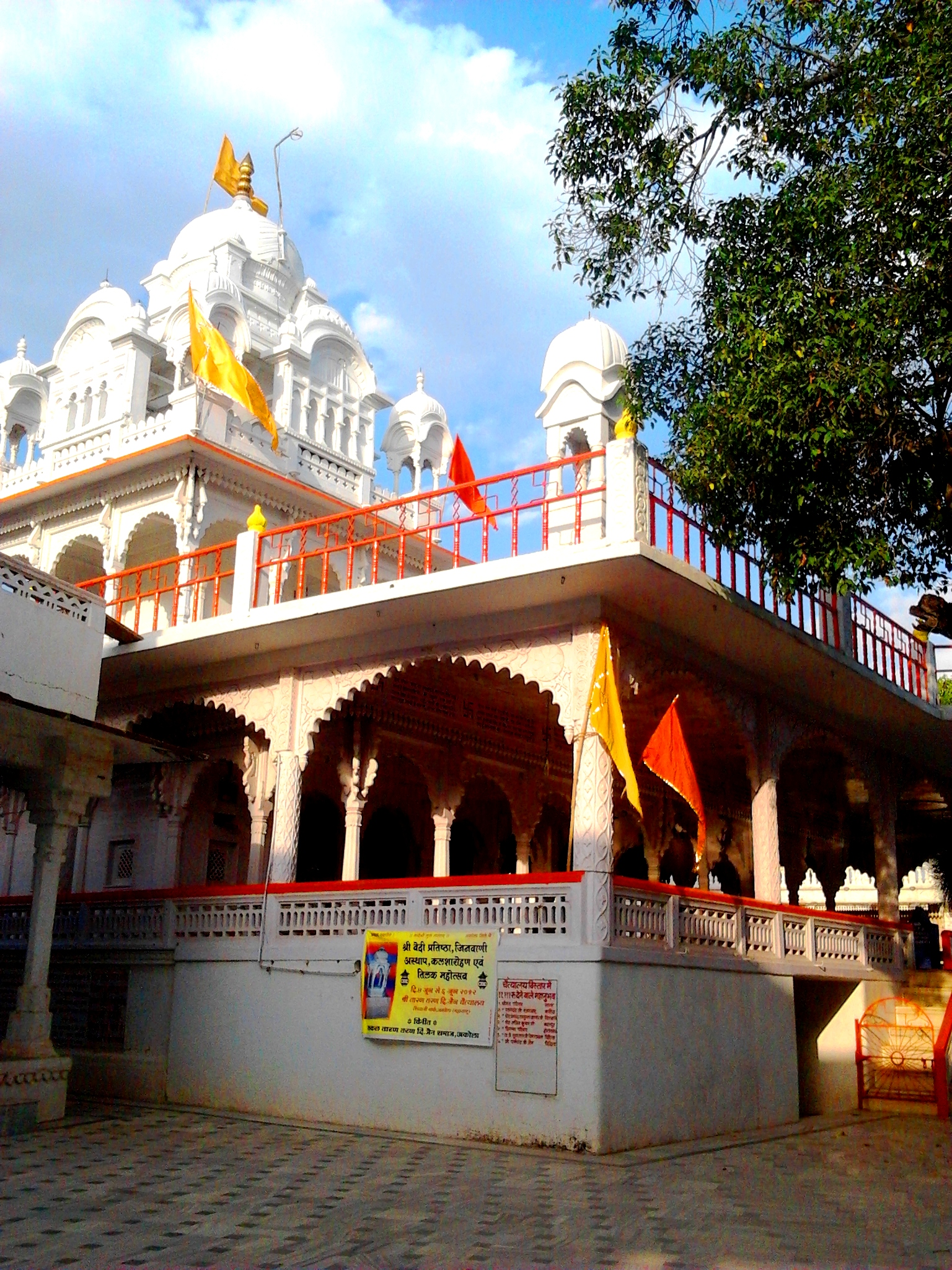
Nisai Ji

The main religious site is the Shri Katara Swami, a temple of Hanuman.

The city is home to several temples and other historical sites. Hindu temples, include Jatashankar temple, Gayatri temple, Moti Maharaj temple, Shani Dev temple, Hare Ram temple, Maruti Hanuman temple, and Panchmukhi temple (Nai basti) and Galaus Sankatmochan temple are located in the outskirts of the city.

Jain temples in the city include the Nabhinandan Digambar Jain temple (as much as 1000 years old) it is also known as bada mandir of jainsim, Mandir Shantinath Digambar Jain temple, Taaran Taran Digambar Jain temple, and Kund-kund Digambar Jain temple. Nisai Ji, a Digambar Jain temple, is located near the Betwa river. The samadhi state of Taran Svami, founder of the Taran Panth sect of Jainism, is located there.

Anekant Gyan Mandir, a Jain center, preserves some of the oldest manuscripts related to Jainism. Shrutdham Jain temple is a Jain attraction it have some old books of jainism [about 2500 years old ]books and 500 years old idol of jainism.

== Popular culture ==
Some scenes of Raj Kapoor's Bollywood movie Teesri Kasam (1966) were filmed in and nearby the city, and the song "Sajan re jhooth mat bolo" sung by Mukesh was filmed near Khimlasa, 25 km from Bina.

== See also ==
- Bina Junction railway station
- Sagar District
