= Sohar Aluminium =

Coordinates: 24.417°N 56.5496°E

Sohar Aluminium Company is the first Aluminium smelter in the Sultanate of Oman. Established in 2004, it is under the ownership of Oman Oil Company, Abu Dhabi National Energy Company PJSC – TAQA and Rio Tinto, a leading aluminium mining and production company. The company's annual production of primary aluminium is 375,000 tonnes per annum and it has a port facility for receiving and exporting aluminium and can support vessels with a capacity of at least 75,000 metric tonnes.

== History ==
Formed in September 2004, Sohar Aluminium LLC is a joint venture between Oman Oil Company S.A.O.G (40%), Abu Dhabi Water and Electricity Authority (40%), and Rio Tinto Alcan (20%). Tony Kinsman was appointed CEO of Sohar Aluminium in September 2004.

== See also ==
- List of aluminium smelters
- Sohar
