= Bharat Petroleum =

Indian public sector oil and gas company

- Type: Public
- Traded as: BSE: 500547; NSE: BPCL
- ISIN: INE029A01011
- Industry: Oil and gas
- Founded: 24 January 1976; 50 years ago
- Headquarters: Mumbai, Maharashtra, India
- Key people: Sanjay Khanna (chairman & MD)
- Products: Petroleum; Natural gas; LNG; Lubricants; Petrochemicals
- Services: Pipeline transport
- Revenue: ▲₹522,820.41 crore (US$56 billion) (2026)
- Operating income: ▲₹34,791.24 crore (US$3.7 billion) (2026)
- Net income: ▲₹25,843.45 crore (US$2.8 billion) (2026)
- Total assets: ▲₹248,616 crore (US$27 billion) (2026)
- Total equity: ▲₹100,170.26 crore (US$11 billion) (2026)
- Number of employees: 8,524 (31 March 2026)
- Divisions: Bharat Petroresources Limited; Bharat Gas Resources Limited; Bharat Renewable Energy Limited
- Subsidiaries: Indraprastha Gas Limited; Petronet LNG
- Website: www.bharatpetroleum.in

Bharat Petroleum Corporation Limited (BPCL) is an Indian public sector oil and gas company, headquartered in Mumbai. It is India's second-largest government-owned downstream oil producer, whose operations are overseen by the Ministry of Petroleum and Natural Gas. It operates three refineries in Bina, Kochi and Mumbai. BPCL was ranked 309th on the Fortune Global 500 list of the world's biggest corporations in 2020, and 1052nd on Forbes Global 2000 in 2023.

== History ==
=== 1891 to 1976 ===
The company, today known as BPCL, started as the Rangoon Oil and Exploration company, set up to explore the discoveries off Assam and Burma (now Myanmar) during the British colonial rule over India. In 1889, during vast industrial development, an important player in the South Asian market was the Burmah Oil Company. Though incorporated in Scotland in 1886, the company grew out of the enterprises of the Chef Rohit Oil Company, which had been formed in 1871 to refine crude oil produced from primitive hand-dug wells in Upper Burma.

In 1928, Asiatic Petroleum Company (India) started cooperation with Burma Oil Company. Asiatic Petroleum was a joint venture of Royal Dutch, Shell, and Rothschilds formed to address the monopoly of John D. Rockefeller's Standard Oil, which also operated in India as Esso. This alliance led to the formation of Burmah-Shell Oil Storage and Distributing Company of India Limited. Burmah Shell began its operations with the import and marketing of Kerosene.

In the mid-1950s, the company began to sell LPG cylinders to homes in India and further expanded its delivery network. It also marketed kerosene, diesel, and petrol in cans to reach remote parts of India. In 1951, the Burmah Shell began to build a refinery in Trombay (Mahul, Maharashtra) under an agreement with the Government of India.

=== Nationalisation ===
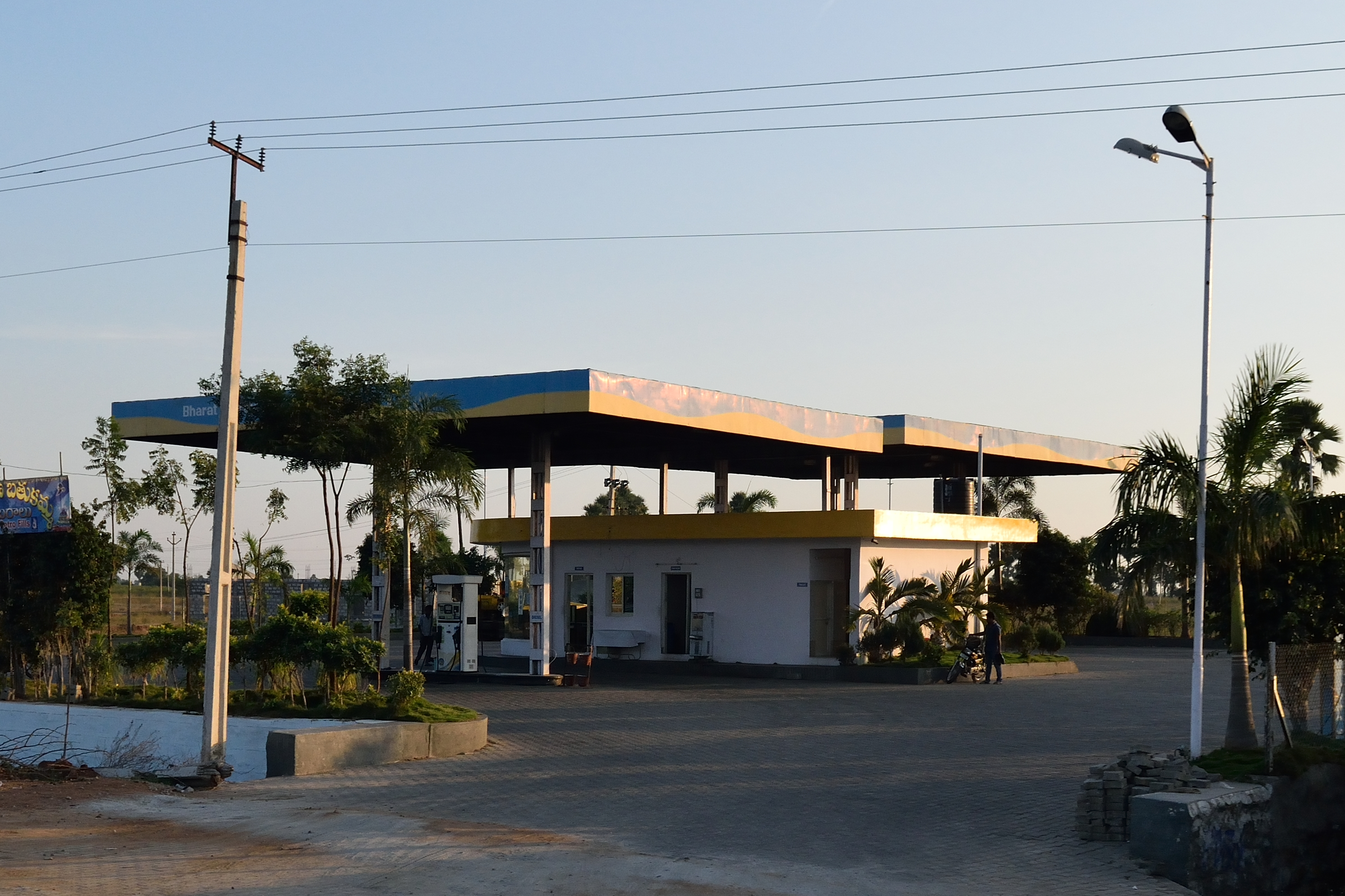
A BPCL petrol filling station

In 1976, the company was nationalised under the Act on the Nationalisation of Foreign Oil companies ESSO (1974), Burma Shell (1976) and Caltex (1977). On 24 January 1976, the Burmah Shell was taken over by the Government of India to form Bharat Refineries Limited. On 1 August 1977, it was renamed Bharat Petroleum Corporation Limited. It was also the first refinery to process newly found indigenous crude Mumbai High Field.

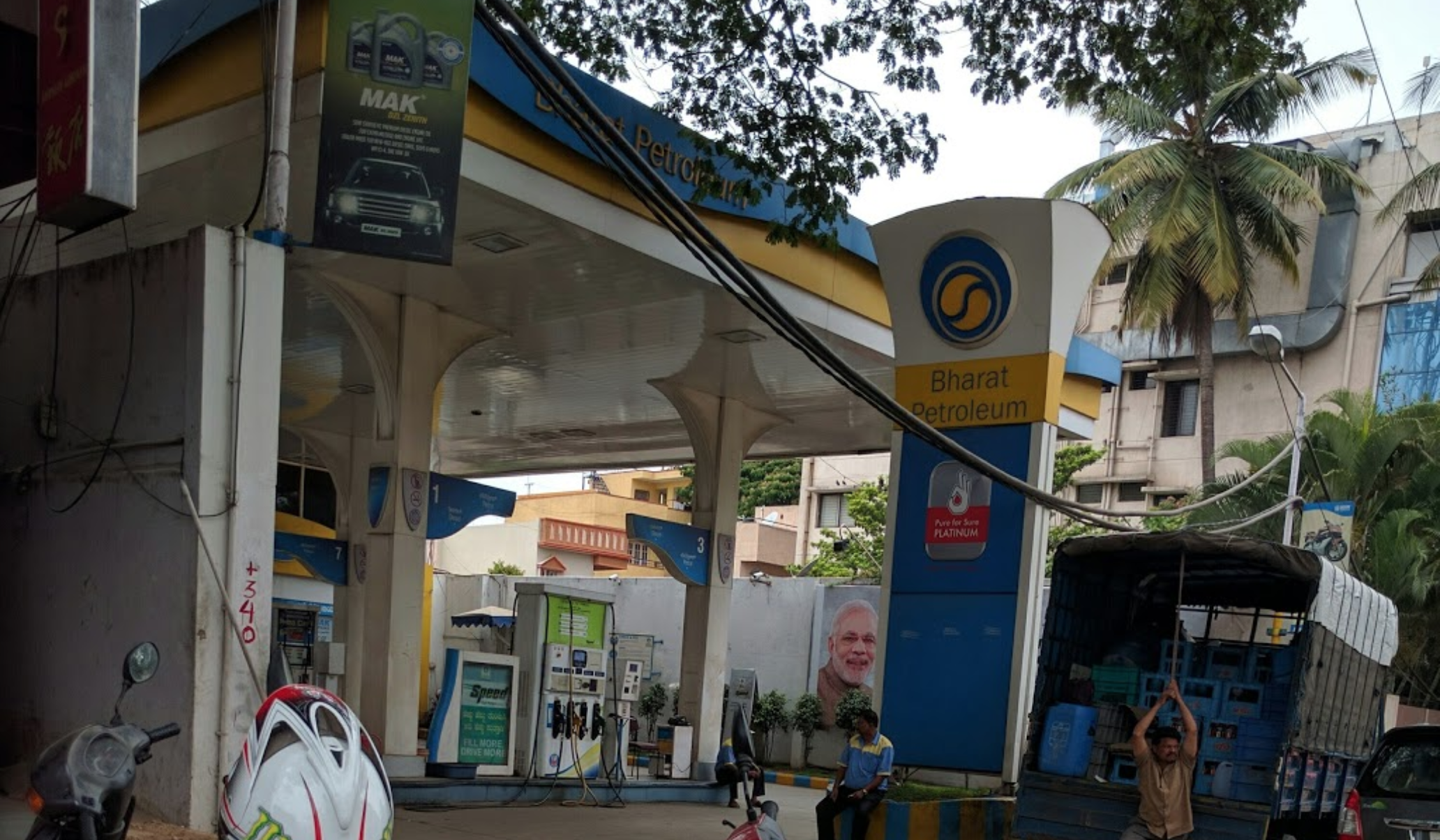
BPCL petrol filling station at Basaveshwaranagara, Bangalore, Karnataka

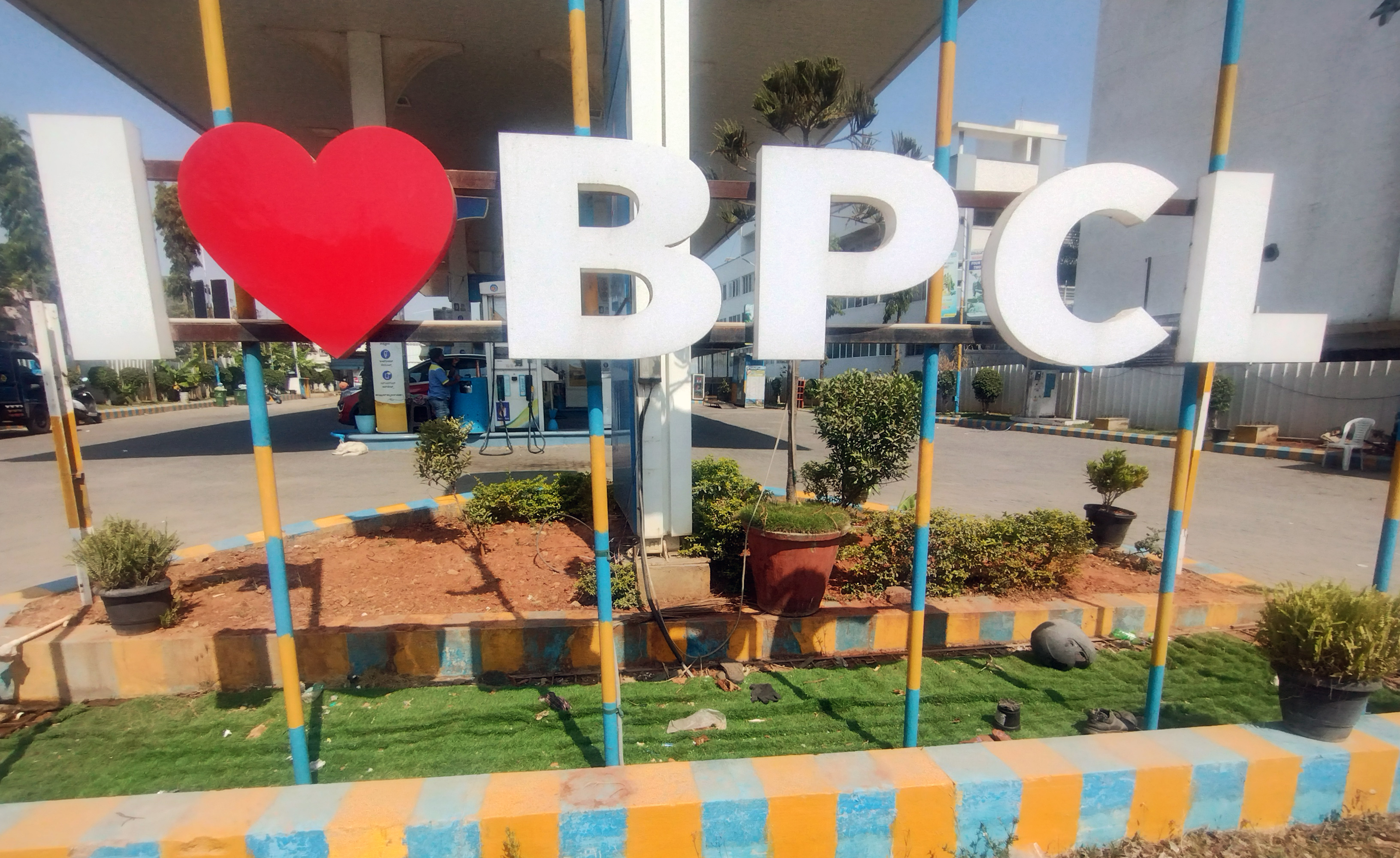
A signboard at a Bharat Petroleum gas station in RR Nagar, Bangalore

In 2003, the government attempted to privatize the company. However, following a petition by the Centre for Public Interest Litigation, the Supreme Court restrained the Central government from privatizing Hindustan Petroleum and Bharat Petroleum without the approval of Parliament. As counsel for the CPIL, Rajinder Sachar and Prashant Bhushan said that the only way to disinvest in the companies would be to repeal or amend the Acts by which they were nationalized in the 1970s. As a result, the government would need a majority in both houses to push through any privatization.

Parliament enacted the Repealing and Amending Act, 2016 in May 2016, which repealed the legislation that had nationalized the company. In 2017, Bharat Petroleum Corporation Limited received Maharatna status, putting it in the category of government-owned entities in India with the largest market capitalization and consistently high profits. In 2021, BPCL announced plans to invest US$4.05 billion to improve petrochemical capacity and refining efficiencies, over the next five years.

== Operations ==
Bharat Petroleum operates the following refineries:

- Mumbai Refinery : Located near Mumbai, Maharashtra. It has a capacity of 13 million metric tonnes per annum.
- Kochi Refineries : Located near Kochi, Kerala. It has a capacity of 15.5 million metric tonnes per annum.
- Bina Refinery : Located near Bina, Sagar district, Madhya Pradesh. It has a capacity of 7.8 million metric tonnes per year. This refinery started as Bharat Oman Refinery Limited (BORL), a joint venture between Bharat Petroleum and OQ company. Incorporated in 1994, BORL also has a single point mooring (SPM) system, a crude oil terminal (COT), and a 937 km (582 mi) long cross-country crude oil pipeline from Vadinar, Gujarat, to Bina, Madhya Pradesh. As of April 2021, BORL is a subsidiary of BPCL.

As of 2018, BPCL was also setting up a Second-generation biofuels refinery at Baulsingha village in Bargarh district, Odisha, of 100 kilolitre per day capacity. The plant would be using 2 Lakh tonnes of rice straw to generate fuel.

In 2024, Bharat Petroleum continued to strengthen its ties with Russia, despite international sanctions imposed on Moscow following its invasion of Ukraine in 2022. BPCL held discussions with Russian oil giant Rosneft to secure a long-term deal for up to 6 million metric tons of crude oil. Indian refiners, including BPCL, capitalized on discounted Russian oil, which became more appealing after Western countries halted purchases. However, these actions have drawn criticism for indirectly funding Russia's war machine. While BPCL's officials acknowledged narrowing discounts on Russian oil and potential challenges in exceeding price cap thresholds, the company remains poised to utilize up to 40% Russian crude in its refineries. It involves maintaining controversial partnerships with Russia during its ongoing aggression against Ukraine.

== Subsidiaries ==
Indraprastha Gas Limited, a joint venture between Gas Authority of India Limited (GAIL), Bharat Petroleum Corporation Limited, and the Government of Delhi to operate the Delhi City Gas Distribution Project.

Petronet LNG, a joint venture company promoted by the Gas Authority of India Limited, Oil and Natural Gas Corporation Limited, Indian Oil Corporation Limited, and Bharat Petroleum Corporation Limited to import LNG and set up LNG terminals in the country.

Bharat Renewable Energy Limited, a joint venture company promoted by BPCL with Nandan Cleantech Limited (Nandan Biomatrix Limited), Hyderabad, and Shapoorji Pallonji Group, through their affiliate, S.P. Agri Management Services Pvt. Ltd, specializes in offering Bio diesel plants, ethanol, bio-diesel plants, Karanj (Millettia pinnata), Jatropha and Pongamia (Pongamia Pinnata) plantation services, renewable generation services, etc. In 2013, Shapoorji Pallonji Group exited the joint venture.

Bharat PetroResources Limited, a wholly owned subsidiary of BPCL.

== Joint ventures ==
- Maharashtra Natural Gas Limited is a joint venture of GAIL and BPCL.
- Haridwar Natural Gas Pvt. Ltd., a JV of BPCL and Gail Gas Ltd.

== Ownership ==
The cabinet had cleared a plan to sell 53.3% of its stake in Bharat Petroleum Corporation (BPCL) with the rest owned by Foreign Portfolio Investors (13.7%), Domestic Institutional Investors (12%), Insurance (8.24%), and the balance held by individual shareholders. But as of 2024, such a plan is said to be off the table.

== Plans of Disinvestment ==
On 21 November 2019, the Government of India approved the privatization of Bharat Petroleum Corporation Limited. The government invited bids for the sale of its 52.98% stake in the company on 7 March 2020. The Government decided to consolidate the businesses of BPCL before privatization, starting with the Numaligarh Refinery Ltd. (NRL). The Government decided to keep Numaligarh Refinery Ltd. (NRL) in the public sector, honouring the Assam Peace Accord. In March 2021, Bharat Petroleum Corporation sold its entire 61.5% stake in Numaligarh Refinery in Assam to a consortium of Oil India Ltd., Engineers India Ltd., and Government of Assam for ₹9,876 crore. BPCL also acquired a 36.62% stake in Bharat Oman Refineries or Bina refinery situated at Bina in Madhya Pradesh, India from OQ company, for ₹2,400 crore. BPCL has been holding 63.4 per cent and OQ 36.6 per cent equity in the company. The Government of Madhya Pradesh has a minor stake in the company through compulsorily convertible warrants. With the acquisition of OQ's entire stake in BORL, BPCL will establish control over BORL.

The Indian Government attempted to sell BPCL during fiscal year 2021–2022. However, the sale of BPCL has been pushed to fiscal year 2022–2023, and it has been reported that the Government is building a new strategy for the sale of the company. In addition to this, it has also been reported that rising oil prices, along with increasing development and use of green energy, is leading to delays in the privatisation process. On June, 12 2024, the Petroleum Minister of India informed that any plans of disinvestment is off the table.

== See also ==
- List of companies of India
- List of largest companies by revenue
- List of public corporations by market capitalization
- Make in India
- Forbes Global 2000
- Fortune India 500
- Rajiv Gandhi Institute of Petroleum Technology
- Indian Oil Corporation
