= Petronet LNG =

Indian natural gas company

Petronet LNG Limited

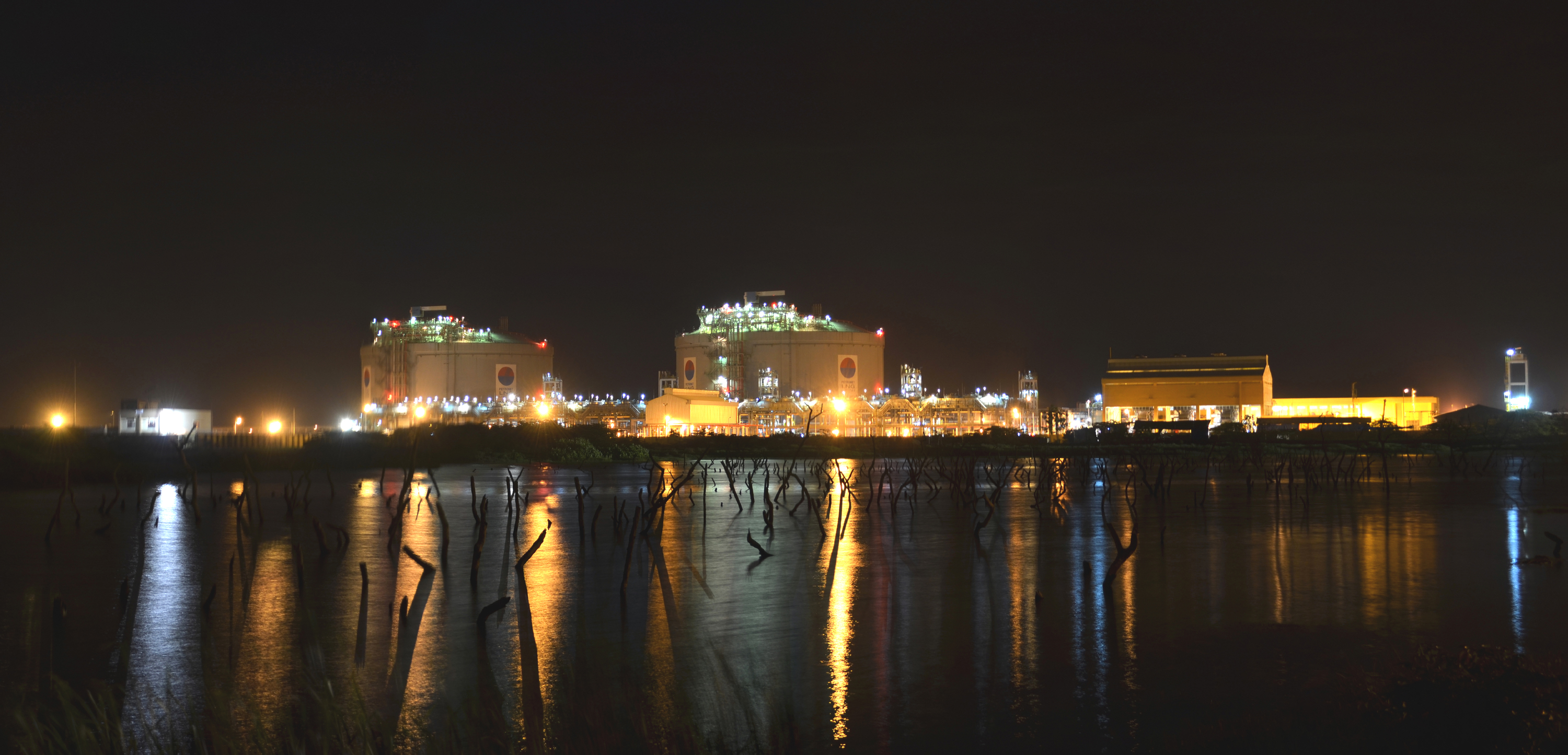
- Kochi LNG Terminal of Petronet LNG
- Type: Public
- Traded as: BSE: 532522; NSE: PETRONET
- Industry: Oil and gas
- Founded: 1998; 28 years ago
- Headquarters: New Delhi, India
- Key people: Pankaj Jain (non-executive chairman); Akshay Kumar Singh (MD & CEO)
- Products: Liquefied natural gas
- Revenue: ▼₹52,729 crore (US$5.5 billion)(FY24)
- Operating income: ▲₹4,947 crore (US$510 million)(FY24)
- Net income: ▲₹3,527 crore (US$370 million)(FY24)
- Total assets: ▲₹25,523 crore (US$2.7 billion) (FY24)
- Total equity: ▲₹17,410 crore (US$1.8 billion) (FY24)
- Owner: Government of India
- Number of employees: 508 (2020)
- Website: www.petronetlng.in

Kochi Terminal View from Fort Kochi

Petronet LNG Limited is an Indian oil and gas company formed by the Government of India to import liquefied natural gas (LNG) and set up LNG terminals in the country. It is a joint venture company promoted by the Gas Authority of India Limited (GAIL), Oil and Natural Gas Corporation Limited (ONGC), Indian Oil Corporation Limited (IOC) and Bharat Petroleum Corporation Limited (BPCL). Petronet LNG Limited, one of the companies in the Indian energy sector, has set up the country's first LNG receiving and regasification terminal in Dahej, Gujarat, and another terminal in Kochi, Kerala. While the Dahej terminal has a nominal capacity of 17.5 million tonnes per year (equivalent to 70 million cubic metre per day of natural gas at standard conditions), the Kochi terminal has a capacity of 5 million tonnes per year (equivalent to 20 million cubic metre per day of natural gas). Plans to build a third LNG terminal in Gangavaram, Andhra Pradesh were dropped in October 2019.

The company Gaz de France has selected Petronet as its strategic partner. The company has also signed an LNG sale and purchase agreements with QatarEnergy LNG for the supply of 8.5 MTPA LNG to India.

Petronet LNG Ltd has set up its first LNG terminal in Dahej in Gujarat with the capacity of 15 million metric tons per year. Capacity of Dahej Terminal will expand to 17.5 million tons per year till 2019. Another terminal with capacity 5 million tons per year is commissioned in Kochi (Kerala) and started its operations in August 2013. Petronet LNG is planning to set up its third LNG terminal with capacity 5 million tons per year probably in Andhra Pradesh.

Kochi LNG Terminal is situated in the Special Economic Zone (SEZ) of Puthuvypeen near the entrance to Cochin Port, Kerala. The jetty facility at Kochi terminal is designed to receive LNG tankers of capacity from 65,000 m^{3} up to 216,000 m^{3}, with possibility of receiving suitable smaller ships.

There are various services offered by Petronet LNG Limited, like regasification, storage and reloading, bunkering, gassing-up and cooling-down facilities and LNG truck loading facilities.

In September 2019, PetroNet signed an MoU with United States–based Tellurian Inc to purchase a stake in the latter's Driftwood project in Louisiana and to import 5 million tonnes of LNG annually. The deal was initially expected to be finalized by 31 March 2020, but the non-binding agreement was instead terminated in November 2020 due to low LNG prices adversely affecting the investment case.

On 6 February 2024, Petronet LNG signed a supply deal with QatarEnergy for 7.5 million metric tons a year of LNG from 2028 to 2048. The agreement was to renew an existing deal with QatarEnergy that expires in 2028 for the same amount of yearly LNG deliveries.

On 20 August 2024, MoU was signed between Sri Lanka's LTL Holdings Limited and India's Petronet LNG Limited for the infrastructure development of the Sobadhanavi Combined Cycle Power Plant at Kerawalapitiya, north Colombo.

Petronet LNG continued to have increases in profits into the fourth quarter of 2025, by May there was a 45% increase even with a 10% decline in revenue.

In order to finance its petrochemicals project, Petronet LNG secured a ₹12,000 crore term loan in December 2025.

== Listings and shareholding ==
Shareholder	Shareholding
Public and FIIs	50.00%
Indian Oil Corporation Limited (IOCL)	12.50%
Bharat Petroleum Corporation Limited (BPCL)	12.50%
Gas Authority of India Limited (GAIL)	12.50%
Oil and Natural Gas Corporation Limited (ONGC)	12.50%
