= Bina Refinery =

Oil refinery

Bina Refinery बीना रिफाइनरी
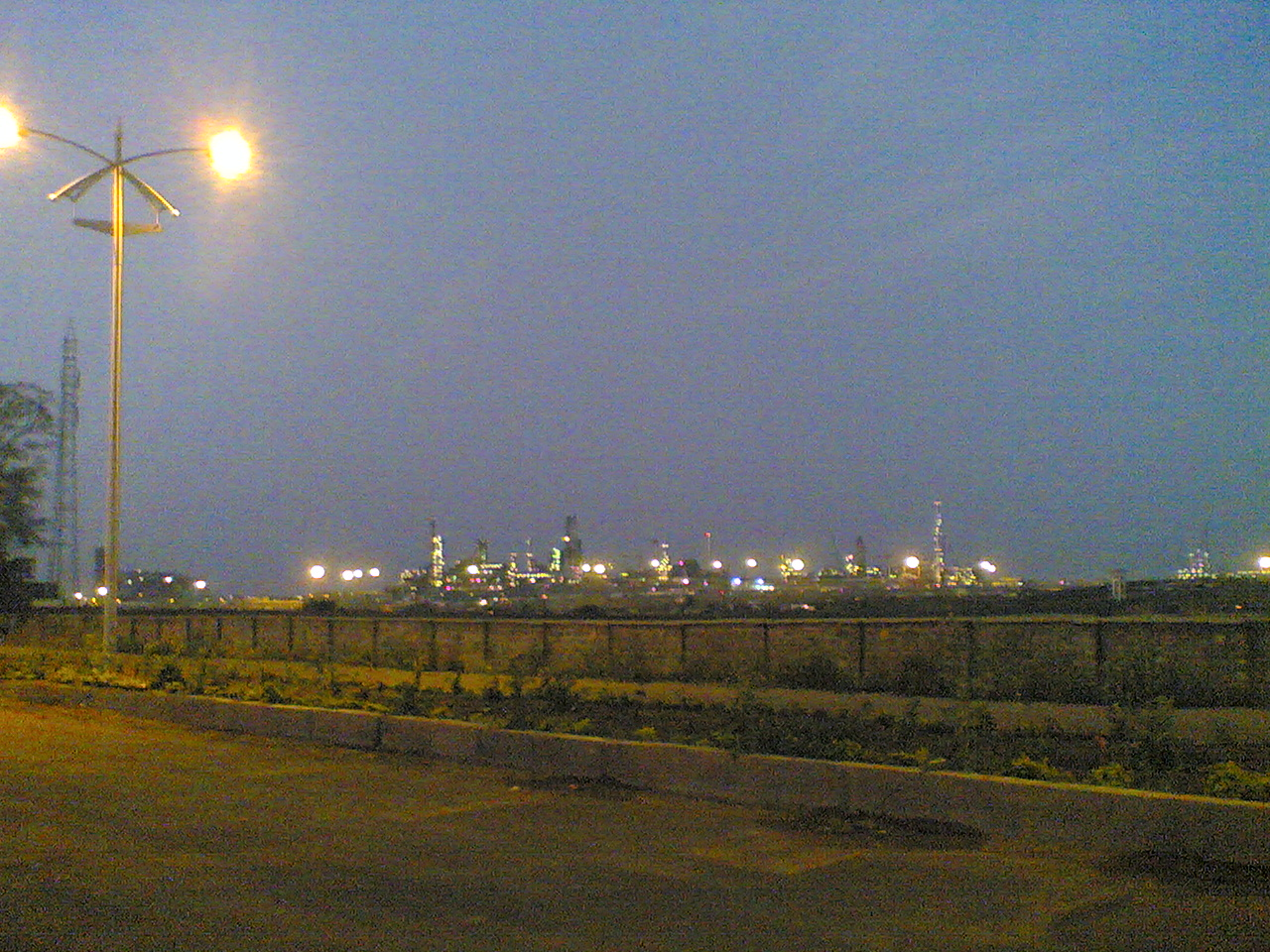
- Interactive map of Bina Refinery बीना रिफाइनरी
- Location: Bina, Madhya Pradesh, India; 24.2515°N 78.1587°E

Refinery details
- Operator: Bharat Petroleum Corporation Limited
- Owners: Ministry of Petroleum and Natural Gas, Government of India
- Opened: May 2011
- Capacity: 120,489.307 barrels per day (19,156.2690 m^{3}/d)

Bina Refinery is an oil refinery located at Bina in the Sagar district of Madhya Pradesh, India. It is owned and operated by BPCL, a wholly owned subsidiary of Bharat Petroleum Corporation Limited. As of 2013, the capacity of the refinery was 6 million metric tonnes per annum or 43,978,597.06 barrels per annum.

== Capacity ==
The refinery is designed to process 6 MTPA of Arab mix crude (65% Arab light and 35% Arab heavy). It has the flexibility to process other types of Middle East crude oil. It can process crude from an API range of 28 to 40.

Unit	Capacity (in MTPA)
Crude / vacuum distillation unit	7.8
Full conversion hydrocracker	1.95
Diesel hydrotreater	1.63
Delayed coker unit	1.36
Hydrogen unit	0.07
Naphtha hydrotreater	1.0
CCR reformer unit	0.5
Isomerization unit	0.3
