= List of industrial estates in Odisha =

This is a list of industrial estates in Odisha, India. These estates are primarily developed and managed by the Odisha Industrial Infrastructure Development Corporation to promote industrialisation, particularly in the micro, small and medium enterprises (MSME) sector. The list includes notified industrial estates and growth centres across different regions of the state.

== List ==
=== Bhubaneswar region ===
- Mancheswar Industrial Estate, Bhubaneswar
- Chandaka Industrial Estate, Bhubaneswar
- Rasulgarh Industrial Estate, Bhubaneswar
- Patia Industrial Estate, Bhubaneswar

=== Cuttack region ===
- Jagatpur Industrial Estate, Cuttack
- Ramdaspur Industrial Estate, Cuttack
- Khapuria Industrial Estate, Cuttack

=== Khordha district ===
- Khurda Industrial Estate
- Barunei Industrial Estate, Khordha

=== Coastal Odisha ===
- Paradip Industrial Estate, Paradip
- Gopalpur Industrial Estate, Gopalpur
- Balasore Industrial Estate, Balasore

=== Western Odisha ===
- Rourkela Industrial Estate, Rourkela
- Jharsuguda Industrial Estate, Jharsuguda
- Sambalpur Industrial Estate, Sambalpur
- Bargarh Industrial Estate, Bargarh

=== Southern Odisha ===
- Rayagada Industrial Estate, Rayagada
- Jeypore Industrial Estate, Jeypore
- Berhampur Industrial Estate, Berhampur

== See also ==
- Economy of Odisha
- Industrial park
