= Indane (disambiguation) =

Indane is a hydrocarbon petrochemical compound, with formula C_{9}H_{10}.

Indane may also refer to:

== Business ==
- Indane (LPG), LPG brand developed and owned by Indian Oil Corporation in India

== Chemistry ==
- Indium trihydride, also called indane
- Indane-5-sulfonamide, base structure of indanesulfonamides
