= Chandaka Industrial Estate =

Industrial area located in the Chandaka region

Chandaka Industrial Estate is an industrial area located in the Chandaka region near Bhubaneswar in the state of Odisha. Developed by the IDCO, it forms part of the broader industrial infrastructure supporting small and medium-scale enterprises in and around the state capital. The estate accommodates a range of industries, including manufacturing, fabrication, and service-oriented units, benefiting from its proximity to major transport corridors and urban markets. The estate has contributed to regional economic activity and employment generation, and is often considered alongside other industrial clusters in the Bhubaneswar–Cuttack region.

== See also ==
- Khurda Industrial Estate
- Ramdaspur Industrial Estate
- Khurda Industrial Estate
