= Gujarat Refinery =

Oil refinery in Gujarat, India

- Location of the Gujarat Refinery in Gujarat Gujarat Refinery (India)
- Location: Koyali, Vadodara, Gujarat, India; 22.3705°N 73.1255°E

Refinery details
- Owner: Indian Oil Corporation Limited
- Opened: 1965
- Capacity: 13.7×10^{6} tonnes/a

The Gujarat Refinery is an oil refinery located at Koyali, Vadodara District in Gujarat, Western India. It is the third largest refinery owned by Indian Oil Corporation after Paradip and Panipat Refinery. The refinery is currently under projected expansion to 18 million tonnes per year.

== History ==
Following the conclusion of the Indo-Soviet Treaty of Friendship and Cooperation in February 1961, a site for the establishment of a 2 million tonnes per year oil refinery was selected on 17 April 1961. Soviet and Indian engineers signed a contract in October 1961 for the preparation of the project. Prime Minister Jawaharlal Nehru laid the foundation stone of the refinery on 10 May 1963.

The refinery was commissioned with Soviet assistance at a cost of Rs.26 crores began production in October 1965. The first crude distillation unit with a capacity of 1 million tonnes per year was commissioned for trial production on 11 October 1965 and achieved its rated capacity on 6 December 1965. Throughput reached 20% beyond its designed capacity in January 1966.

President Sarvepalli Radhakrishnan dedicated the refinery to the nation with the commissioning of second crude distillation unit and catalytic reforming unit on 18 October 1966.

The third 1 million tonnes per year distillation unit was commissioned in September 1967 to process Ankleshwar and North Gujarat crudes. In December 1968, Udex plant was commissioned for production of benzene and toluene using feedstock from CRU. By 1974–75 with in-house modifications, the capacity of the refinery increased by 40% to a level of 4.2 million tonnes per year. To process imported crude the refinery was expanded during 1978-79 by adding another 3 million tonnes per year crude distillation unit along with downstream processing units including vacuum distillation, visbreaker and bitumen blowing units. By 1980-81 this unit started processing Bombay High crude in addition to imported crudes. It was the first time that Indian engineers independently handled a project of that scale.

To recover products from the residue, secondary processing facilities consisting of fluidized catalytic cracking unit of 1 million tonnes per year capacity along with a feed preparation unit of 1 million tonnes per year capacities, were commissioned in December 1982. The refinery set up pilot distillation facilities for the production of n-Heptane and light aluminum rolling oils. To enable absorption of increased indigenous crudes the refinery's capacity was further increased to 9.5 million tonnes per year.

In 1993–1994, Gujarat commissioned the country's first hydrocracker unit of 1.2 million tonnes per year along with feed preparation unit-2 and hydrogen generation unit-1 (GHC Complex), for conversion of heavier ends of crude oil to high value superior products.

India's first diesel hydrodesulfurisation unit to reduce sulfur content in diesel was commissioned in June 1999. A methyl tertiary butyl ether unit was commissioned in September 1999 to eliminate lead from motor fuels. The facility conceptualised and commissioned South Asia's largest centralised effluent treatment plant (ETP) by dismantling the four old ETPs in June 1999. By September 1999 with the commissioning of an atmospheric distillation unit, Gujarat Refinery further augmented its capacity to 13.7 million tonnes per year making it the largest public sector undertaking refinery of the country.

A project for production of linear alkyl benzene from kerosene streams was implemented in August 2004. It is the largest grassroots single train Kerosene-to-LAB unit in the world, with an installed capacity of 1.2 million tonnes per year. To meet future fuel quality requirements, motor gasoline (MS) quality improvement facilities were commissioned in 2006. The Residue Upgraation Project undertaken by the Gujarat Refinery was completed by 2011 which increased the high sulfur processing capacity of Gujarat refinery, improved the distillate yield as well produce BS III & IV quality of MS and high-speed diesel (HSD). The Residue Upgradation Project came in two parts namely, the south block which consisted of hydrogen generation unit (HGU)-III, solvent recovery unit (SRU)-III, diesel hydrotreatment (DHDT) and isomerization units and the north block which consisted of vacuum gasoil hydrotreating (VGO)-HDT and delayed coker units. To support the new units a new co-generation plant (CGP) and heat recovery steam generator (HRSG) were also commissioned.

== Description ==
The refinery's facilities include five atmospheric crude distillation units. The major secondary units include catalytic reforming unit (CRU), fluidized catalytic cracking unit (FCCU) and the first hydrocracking unit of the country. Through a pipeline to Ahmedabad and a pipeline connecting to the Barauni-Kanpur pipeline (BKPL) and also by rail and truck, the refinery primarily serves the demand for petroleum products in western and northern India.

When commissioned, the refinery had an installed capacity of 2 million tonnes per year and was designed to process crude from Ankleshwar, Kalol and Nawagam oilfields of ONGC in Gujarat. The refinery was modified to handle imported and Bombay High crude. The refinery also produces a wide range of specialty products such as benzene, toluene, mineral turpentine oil, food grade hexane, solvents and kerosene.

The Gujarat Refinery is the first refinery in India to have completed the diesel hydrodesulfurization project in June 1999, when the refinery started production of HSD with low sulfur content of 0.25% wt (max).

== See also ==
- Indian Oil Corporation
