= Chala LPG tanker disaster =

Road accident in India

Coordinates: 11.848°N 75.429°E

Chala LPG road tanker BLEVE
- Chala LPG tanker disaster (Kerala)
- Date: 27 August 2012
- Venue: Indian National Highway 17 (now NH 66)
- Location: Chala, Kannur, Kannur district, Kerala, India
- Type: LPG road tanker boiling liquid expanding vapour explosion (BLEVE)
- Cause: Collision with road divider
- Deaths: 20
- Injuries: 21

The Chala LPG tanker disaster was a road transport accident that occurred on August 27, 2012, on Indian National Highway 17 (now NH 66) at Chala in the Kannur District of India's Kerala State. The accident occurred when an Indian Oil Corporation Limited (IOCL) LPG road tanker hit a road lane divider, overturned and exploded, starting several building fires between 9:30 p.m. and 11 p.m. The accident killed 20 people.

== Background ==
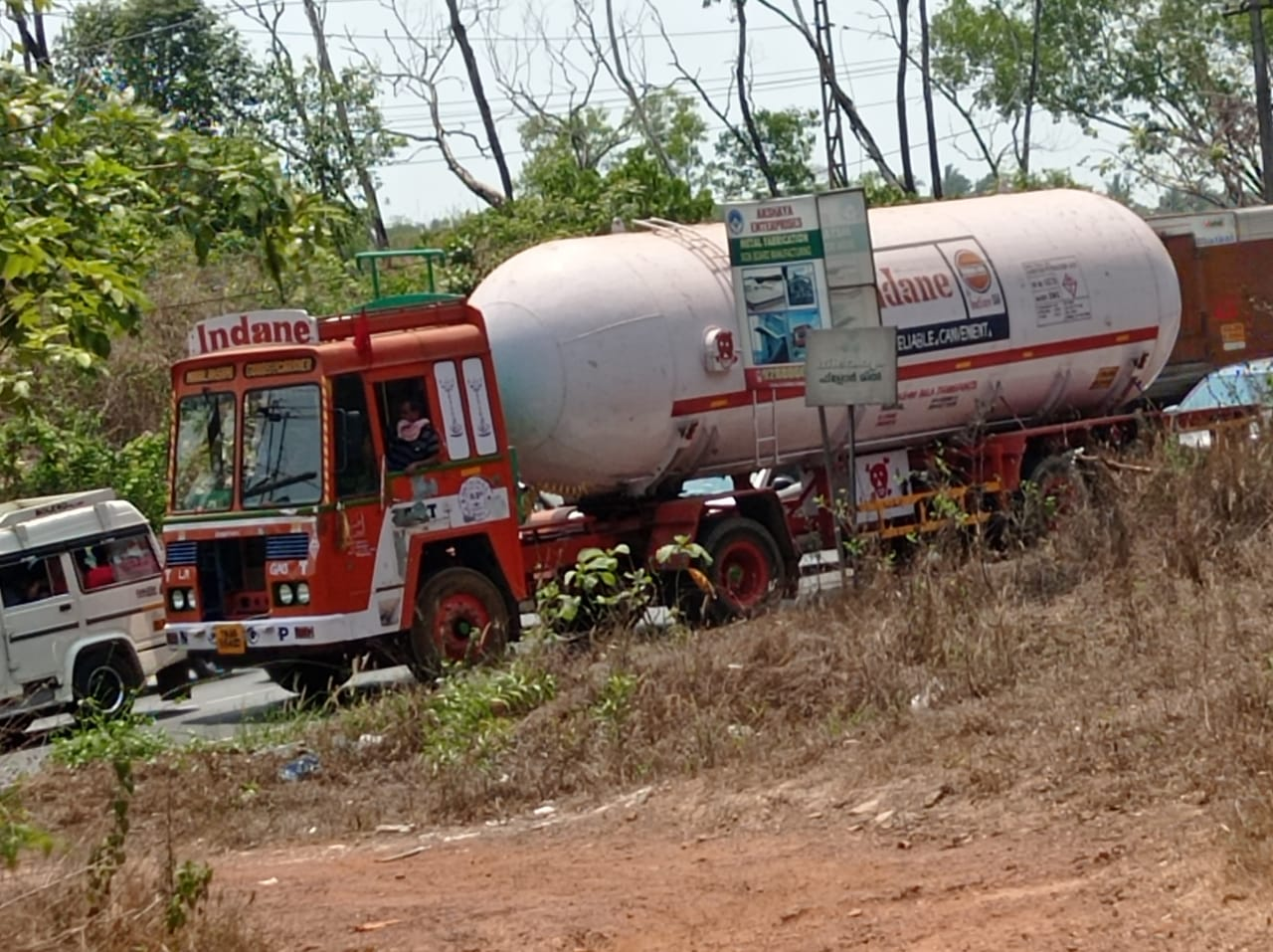
LPG tanker operated by Indane (an IOCL subsidiary) with a 17 tonnes bullet-shaped tank

Government-owned Indian Oil Corporation Limited (IOCL) is an integrated energy major with presence in all the streams of oil, gas and petrochemicals. Among its activities, IOCL transports liquefied petroleum gas (LPG) produced in its refineries to cylinder filling facilities through terrestrial pipelines, railway tank trains and road tankers. IOCL, through its subsidiary Indane, owned the cylinder bottling plant in Chelari, Kozhikode district, Kerala, which receives LPG by road tankers from the Mangalore LPG Import Facility (MLIF), also owned by IOCL and situated 264 km away in Karnataka.

Bullet-shaped LPG tanks mounted on trailer tankers normally have a capacity in excess of 17-tonnes in three compartments.

National Highways in India are constructed and maintained by the National Highway Authority of India (NHAI) and the individual states' public works departments (in this case the Kerala Public Works Department).

== Accident ==
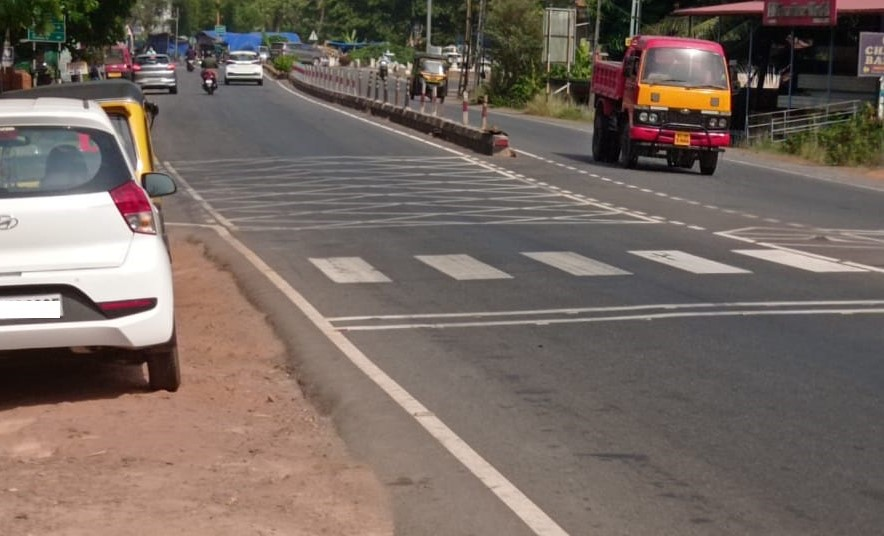
Renovated lane division in 2021

On August 12, 2012 the LPG road tanker involved in the accident was loaded with 17.82 tonnes of LPG in Mangalore, Karnataka, from where it left at 8:18 a.m. It was directed to the Indane (an IOCL subsidiary) LPG bottling plant in Chelari, Kozhikode district, Kerala. In this state LPG tankers are not allowed to travel in public roads between 6:00 a.m. and 6:00 p.m., so the tanker had to stop and wait at the state border for several hours. Around 10:30 p.m., while crossing the town of Chala, between Kannur and Thalasseri, the driver tried to overtake a vehicle and, in so doing, hit a concrete road divider near the Bhagavati temple bus stop.

The lane division was installed to segregate traffic in opposite directions. The concrete divider started at the temple bus stop –where the slope from the adjacent hill levelled off– and extended 200 metres up to the next junction. The divider was constructed by fixing 50 cm-high concrete blocks along the centre line. The blocks, originally painted in white and black stripes, were blackened with vehicle exhausts. There was no sign warning of the obstruction at the beginning of the division. Several traffic accidents had been reported at this spot in the year prior to the accident, with one of them involving an empty LPG tanker collision with the divider and occurring just one week before the disaster. There were a few one- and two-storied commercial buildings on the north side of the highway and several houses on both sides. The nearest house was within 15 m of the highway.

Upon contact, the tractor unit detached from the tank trailer. The valve manifold of the tank broke and LPG started leaking. Where the accident occurred, the terrain slopes down by 1 to 3 metres below the road level on both sides of the highway. The leaked liquid LPG and its heavy vapors descended there and flowed for 170 metres through an irrigation water canal running north to south and crossing the highway roughly at the spot where the accident occurred.

The driver was able to exit the cabin and alert nearby residences before the fire started. Residents called the Kerala State Electricity Board, which immediately isolated the power supply grid. Most of the persons living around the accident spot evacuated their homes, moved away for some distance and stood on the street along the water canal.

Ignition, whose origin is unclear, occurred around 20 minutes after the collision and resulted in a flash fire of the gas spread around the overturned tanker, in the water canal and in the low-lying area on the south. The gas settled in the canal is said to have burnt for 1 to 2 minutes. Persons who had evacuated their houses but stood on the streets on the south and north side of the highway suffered burn injuries. Once the flash fire subsided, a jet fire remained at the leaking area of the overturned bullet tank. During search and rescue attempts were made in fire-impacted houses.

Ten minutes after the onset of the fire, the LPG bullet tank, heated and weakened by the jet fire, ruptured and a severe boiling-liquid expanding-vapor explosion (BLEVE) ensued. A huge fireball formed, and half of the burning tank rocketed upwards, flew over the coconut groves and fell about 400 metres away. The fireball diameter is estimated to have been around 150 metres and its duration in the order of 9–11 seconds.

== Damage and casualties ==
Fire engines of Kerala Fire and Rescue Services approached the accident, with some of them arriving before the BLEVE onset. Five fire engines from Kannur (7 km away) and Thalassery (15 km away) fire stations attended the incident.

Victims, who were those who evacuated their homes but were standing along the highway and the canal, suffered burns from the first flash fire and the BLEVE. There was no injury due to consequent building fires. Twenty people died due to burn injuries in various hospitals in a period between 24 hours to 30 days from the time of the incident. Another 21 received treatment for burns. The fire damaged 20 houses and 23 shops, although reports on this subject differ. Seven houses suffered severe fire and explosion damage necessitating demolition. Eleven vehicles were gutted in the fire.

== Aftermath ==
The tanker driver was arrested by the police at a later date.

The tragedy caused local uproar and protest against government officials who visited the accident site. Kerala Chief Minister Oommen Chandy, his ministerial colleagues and the leader of the opposition V.S. Achuthanandan visited the accident spot, the hospitalized victims and the houses of those who died. Achuthanandan demanded that a murder case be filed against IOCL. The road divider involved in the accident was demolished by the Public Works Department on Chandy's orders.

M. Ponnambalam, president of the Southern Region Bulk LPG Transport Owners’ Association (SRBLPGTOA) said that the accident happened due to poor road conditions and that "driving through Kannur’s bad roads is a nightmare." Protests and blockade of LPG tankers occurred in several parts of the district for a few months. People demanded that LPG transport on roads in the state be stopped and manhandled tanker drivers. In response, SRBLPGTOA called a strike in September 2012.

Several voluntary social organizations worked in the following months in the area to help with restoration of the houses and the rehabilitation of traumatized families.

== Investigation ==
Twenty-two people gave statements in a magisterial inquiry conducted by Kannur District Collector Rathan Kelkar. The owner of a shop near the accident site stated that there was no reflector on the road divider and that the divider was not visible at night due to poor lighting. However, in the same inquiry a Kerala Public Works Department (PWD) official stated that the divider blocks were painted in black and white reflector stripes and a warning sign was present.

The Oil Industry Safety Directorate (OISD), under the Ministry of Petroleum and Natural Gas, published a short report in 2013, which states that the driver's license to carry dangerous goods was expired and the tanker was travelling without a back-up driver, although one was present at the start of the journey. The report concludes that the root causes of the accident were: Issues associated with the stretch of road where the crash occurred, including the lack of traffic signs and in particular of one warning of the obstruction caused by the divider; driver fatigue; and absence of a back-up driver. It further recommended that authorities should ensure strict enforcement of the provisions of the Motor Vehicles Act requiring the use of back-up drivers for certain type of journeys and services. It also recommended design improvements to LPG road tankers, including mechanical protection of the valve manifold, and fitting of an excess flow check valve inside the tank, to make it so that external damage on the valve manifold would not result in catastrophic loss of containment.

The OISD findings are consistent with declarations released by the authorities and on public media. In press conferences after the accident, Chief Minister Chandy stated that improper design of the concrete lane divider was a significant cause of the disaster. Asianet News reported the fatigue of the lone driver and absence of illumination as potential causes.

IOCL announced that their LPG tankers would indeed be fitted with an excess flow check valve inside the tank and also committed to enforce the requirement for two drivers manning their LPG road tankers. The company paid the victims a compensation of ₹26 million (ca. US$430,000).

In November 2013 the crime branch exonerated IOCL and blamed the tanker driver for negligence.

== Later LPG tanker overturning ==
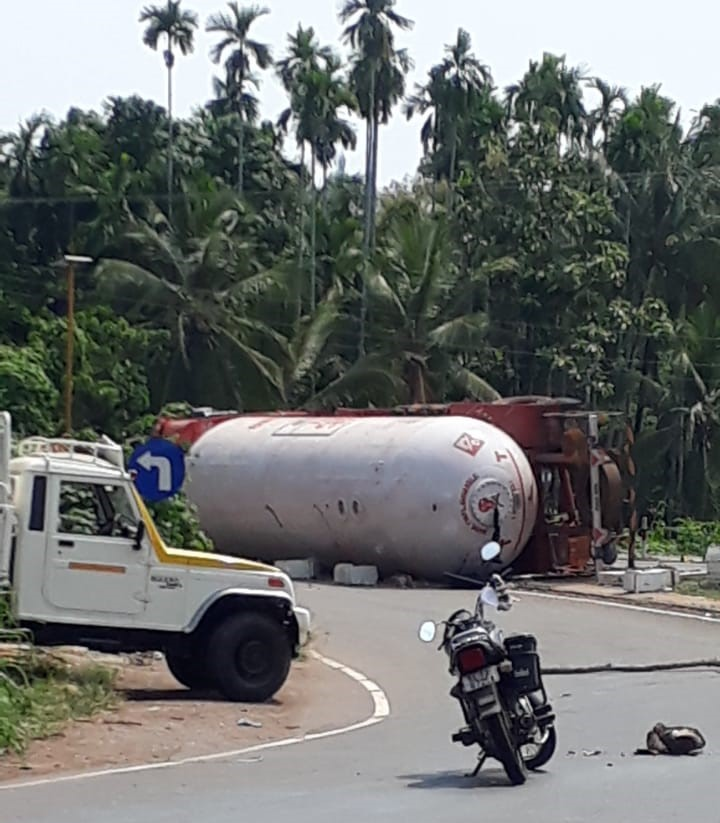
May 2021 accident

In the afternoon of May 6, 2021, an LPG road tanker operated by IOCL overturned 200 metres away from the site of the 2012 accident. The tanker capsized whilst maneuvering at a 90-degree turn. This time the leak was small, in the vapor phase, and did not ignite. Residences were evacuated in a 500 metre radius, and the highway was closed for 12 hours until a IOCL emergency recovery tanker removed the inventory from the overturned vehicle.
