= Jagatpur Industrial Estate =

Industrial estate situated in Jagatpur area of Cuttack

Coordinates: 20°29′28″N 85°55′57″E

Jagatpur Industrial Estate is an industrial estate situated in Jagatpur area of Cuttack in the Indian state of Odisha. The estate, which has been developed and managed by the Industrial Development Corporation of Odisha, is part of a network of industrial estates established to boost small and medium scale industries (MSMEs) and ancillary units in the region. It has an area of approximately 153.66 hectares and houses a variety of manufacturing and resource based industries like auto components, textiles, pharmaceuticals and food processing. The property helps in local employment and industrial diversification. The property is conveniently linked through National Highway 16, nearby Cuttack railway station, and Biju Patnaik International Airport.

== See also ==
- Ramdaspur Industrial Estate
- Kalunga Industrial Estate
- Khurda Industrial Estate
