= Paradip Industrial Estate =

Cluster of industrial sites in Paradip, Odisha, India

Paradip Industrial Estate is a term for the cluster of industrial sites and port-based industrial infrastructure that are in and around Paradip (also spelled Paradeep), a major industrial port town in the Jagatsinghpur district of Odisha, India. The estate is part of an industrial ecosystem centered on Paradip Port, which is one of India's biggest deep-water ports on the Bay of Bengal. Heavy industries, petrochemicals, fertilizers, logistics infrastructure, and downstream manufacturing units are all part of the industrial estate. It is close to the port and transportation networks, which makes it feasible for businesses to get to work.

== See also ==
- Paradip
- Jagatsinghpur district
- Mancheswar Industrial Estate
