= Manas Choudhury =

Indian politician and trade union leader from Odisha

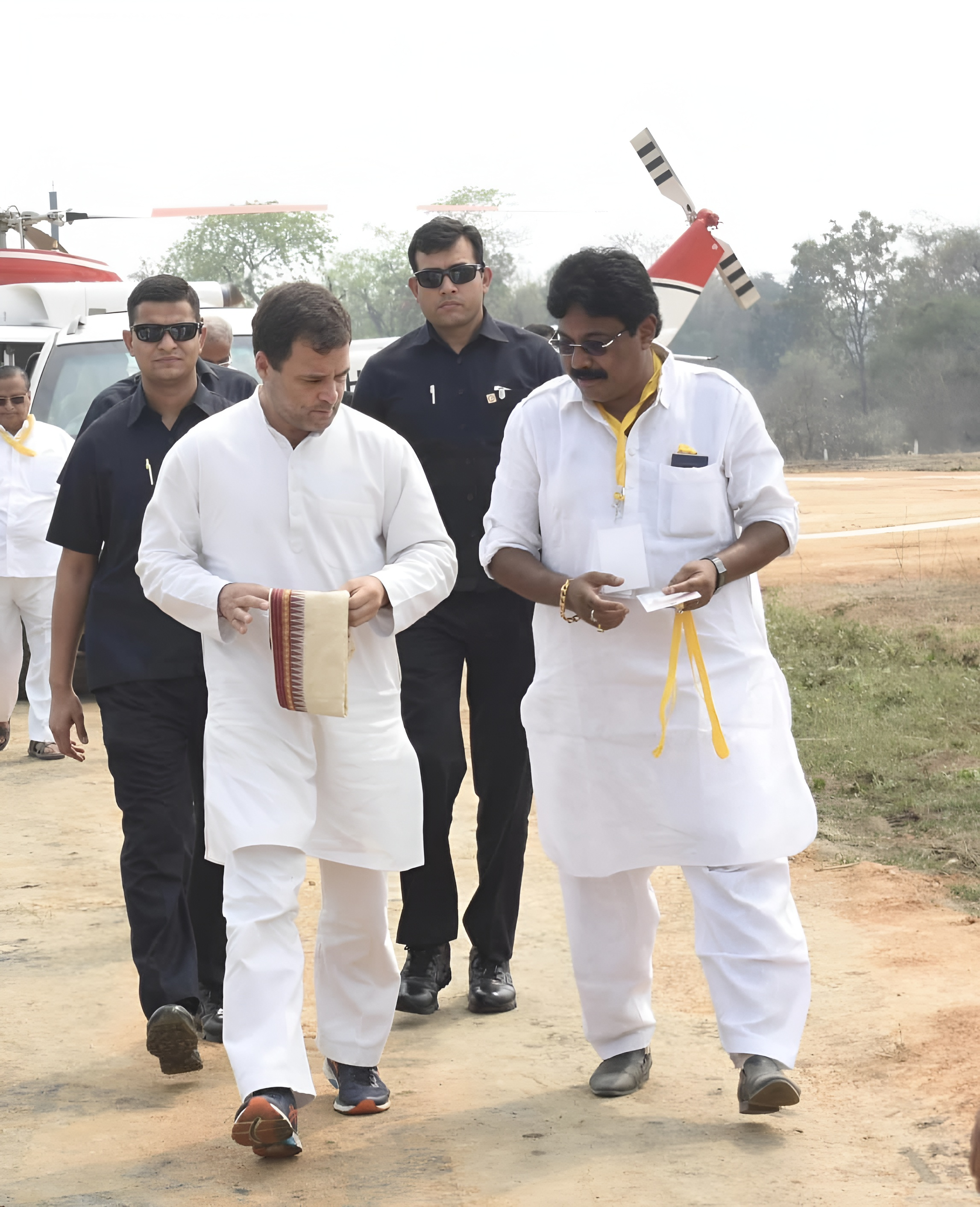
- Choudhury along with Rahul Gandhi in 2024

National Secretary, INTUC
- Incumbent
- Assumed office December 2024

President, Cuttack District Congress Committee
- In office 2020 – June 2024

President, Bhubaneswar District Congress Committee
- In office July 2018 – 2020

Personal details
- Born: August 19 Cuttack, Odisha, India
- Party: Indian National Congress
- Occupation: Politician · Trade-unionist · Entrepreneur

Manas Choudhury (born 19 August) is an Indian politician from Odisha affiliated with the Indian National Congress (INC). He is a member of the All India Congress Committee (AICC) and has served in various organisational roles within the party. He served as President of the Cuttack District Congress Committee from 2020 to June 2024, and was appointed National Secretary of the Indian National Trade Union Congress (INTUC) in December 2024.

== Political career ==
Choudhury began his involvement with the INC in 1998, initially serving as General Secretary of the District Youth Congress in Bhubaneswar, and later as its Vice-President from 2000 to 2003. In 2004, he contested the Odisha Legislative Assembly election from the Cuttack-Sadar constituency as a Congress candidate.

He served as a member of CAPART (Eastern Zone) under the Ministry of Rural Development from 2004 to 2007, and as a trustee of the Paradip Port Trust from 2010 to 2012. He also served as a director of the Urban Cooperative Bank in Bhubaneswar from 2002 to 2008.

Within the Odisha Pradesh Congress Committee (OPCC), Choudhury served as President of the Bhubaneswar District Congress Committee before being appointed President of the Cuttack District Congress Committee in October 2020.

=== Activism as Cuttack DCC President ===
As Cuttack DCC president, Choudhury led several public agitations that drew media attention. In September 2022, he led a protest against the Cuttack Municipal Corporation by presenting a bathroom door to the CMC Commissioner for the Mayor's office, mocking the Mayor's claims of financial difficulties while alleging large-scale spending on official renovations. In December 2022, he met AICC President Mallikarjun Kharge to discuss the Congress party's organisational situation in Odisha.

In July 2023, he led a protest at the office of the Superintendent Engineer of Prachi Division, alleging that an official was demanding bribes in exchange for completing a road in Cuttack Sadar. That same month, he publicly accused the Cuttack District Collector of misusing administrative powers to register government land in his own name.

In April 2024, he was named a member of the Odisha PCC Election Management Committee for the 2024 general elections.

=== Expulsion and reinstatement ===
In June 2024, Congress expelled Choudhury as Cuttack district president for what the party described as "indiscipline and anti-party activities", alleging he had conspired against party candidates during the elections. Following his expulsion, Choudhury held a press conference at Congress Bhawan, accusing OPCC chief Sarat Pattanayak and Odisha in-charge Ajoy Kumar of collecting money for distributing party tickets, and blaming the state leadership for the party's poor performance in the elections. The expulsion triggered protests by the Student and Youth Congress in Cuttack. Choudhury contested the action, maintaining that as an AICC member the state unit lacked jurisdiction over him. His party membership was fully restored in December 2024 following organisational changes within the OPCC.

In December 2024, he was appointed National Secretary of the Indian National Trade Union Congress (INTUC).

In March 2025, Choudhury was arrested in connection with a Congress party protest. In July 2025, an FIR was filed against him and 25 others following a separate protest incident in which a police inspector was garlanded.

== Business activities ==
Choudhury is the managing director of K1 Security Services Pvt Ltd, a private security company based in Odisha.
