= Chennai Petroleum Corporation =

Subsidiary of Indian Oil Corporation

Chennai Petroleum Corporation Limited
- Native name: CPCL
- Formerly: Madras Refineries Limited
- Type: Subsidiary
- Traded as: BSE: 500110; NSE: CHENNPETRO
- ISIN: INE178A01016
- Industry: Oil and gas
- Founded: 18 November 1965
- Headquarters: Chennai, India
- Key people: Arvinder Singh Sahney (Chairman); H Shankar (Managing Director)
- Products: Diesel; Kerosene; LPG; Petrochemicals; Petrol
- Revenue: ▲₹60,474 crore (US$6.5 billion) (2022)
- Operating income: ▲₹1,825 crore (US$190 million) (2022)
- Net income: ▲₹1,336 crore (US$140 million) (2022)
- Total assets: ▲₹17,595 crore (US$1.9 billion) (2022)
- Total equity: ▲₹2,986 crore (US$320 million) (2022)
- Number of employees: 1,684 (2020)
- Parent: Indian Oil Corporation Limited
- Website: www.cpcl.co.in

Chennai Petroleum Corporation Limited (CPCL), formerly known as Madras Refineries Limited (MRL), is a subsidiary of Indian Oil Corporation Limited which is under the ownership of Ministry of Petroleum and Natural Gas of the Government of India. It is headquartered in Chennai, India. It was formed as a joint venture in 1965 between the Government of India (GOI), Amoco and National Iranian Oil Company (NIOC), having a shareholding in the ratio 74%: 13%: 13% respectively. From the grassroots stage CPCL Refinery was set up with an installed capacity of 2.5 million tonnes per year in a record time of 27 months at a cost of ₹430 million (US$4.6 million) without any time or cost overrun. CPCL operates the Manali Refinery in Chennai and formerly operated the Nagapattinam Refinery in Nagapattinam, Tamil Nadu, which was decommissioned with effect from 1 April 2019. A new 9 million tonnes per annum (MMTPA) refinery and petrochemical complex has been proposed at the site of the former refinery.

== History ==
In 1985, Amoco disinvested in favour of GOI and the shareholding percentage of GOI and NIOC stood revised at 62% and 15.38% respectively. Later GOI disinvested 16.92% of the paid up capital in favor of Unit Trust of India, mutual funds, insurance companies and banks on 19 May 1992, thereby reducing its holding to 67.7%. The public issue of CPCL shares at a premium of ₹ 70 (₹ 90 to FIIs) in 1994 was oversubscribed to an extent of 27 times and added a large shareholder base of over 90000. As a part of the restructuring steps taken up by the Government of India, Indian Oil Corporation Limited (IOCL) acquired equity from GOI in 2000–01. Currently IOC holds 51.88% while NIOC continued its holding at wax and petrochemical feedstocks production facilities.

CPCL has two refineries with a combined refining capacity of 11.5 million tonnes per year. The Manali Refinery in Chennai has a capacity of 10.5 million tonnes per year and is one of the most complex refineries in India with fuel, lube, wax and petrochemical feedstocks production facilities. CPCL's second refinery is Nagapattnam Refinery located at Cauvery basin at Nagapattinam in Panagudi. This unit was set up in Nagapattinam with a capacity of 0.5 million tonnes per year in 1993 and later enhanced to 1.0 million tonnes per year. Now this 1.0 million tonnes per year refinery is being dismantled to increase its capacity to 9.0 million tonne per year with cost of ₹27,000 crore (US$2.9 billion) this new project will be completed by 2022 and will boost the company growth further. The main products of the company are LPG, Motor Spirit, superior kerosene, aviation turbine fuel, high speed diesel, naphtha, bitumen, lube base stocks, paraffin wax, fuel oil, hexane and petrochemical feed stocks. The wax plant at CPCL has an installed capacity of 30,000 tonnes per annum, which is designed to produce paraffin wax for manufacture of candle wax, waterproof formulations and match wax. A propylene plant with a capacity of 17,000 tonnes per annum was commissioned in 1988 to supply petrochemical feedstock to neighbouring downstream industries. The unit was revamped to enhance the propylene production capacity to 30,000 tonnes per annum in 2004. CPCL also supplies LABFS to a downstream unit for the manufacture of liner alkyl benzene.

CPCL plays the role of a mother industry supplying feedstocks to the neighbouring industries in Manali. CPCL's products are marketed through IOCL. CPCL's products are mostly consumed domestically except naphtha, fuel oil and lubes which are partly exported.

CPCL has also made pioneering efforts in the field of energy and water conservation by setting up a wind farm and sewage reclamation and sea water desalination plants.

For the entire financial year 2021-22 (FY22), CPCL consolidated net profit was Rs 1,352 crore. Total Revenue for FY 2021-22 was Rs 60,074 crore.

CPCL's equity shares are listed on the Bombay Stock Exchange and National Stock Exchange of India.

The production line has been affected multiple times due to nature's adversities in form of drought and excessive rains.

It is categorized as a Navratna company by the government.

== Controversies ==
It has been reported by affected people & environmentalists that CPCL is releasing Hydrogen Sulphide gas, potent neurotoxins that can damage children’s brains, directly into atmosphere. While CPCL denied it, TNPCB Technical committee report on Manali gas leak confirmed CPCL as the source & recommended CPCL to carry out several capacity building measures including reducing use of bad quality high sulphur crude oil, among other steps.

After the Dec 4th 2023 Chennai floods, CPCL Manali LPG had oil leaks but cleanup didn't start until 7th Dec. As golden period was missed, spill extended to 20 sq. km. impacting more people, property, animals & river. NGT was forced to issue 3-day ultimantum to cleanup & file report on 18th Dec.

== See also ==
- List of public sector undertakings in India
