= Goa Carbon Limited =

Indian petrochemical company

- Company type: Public
- Traded as: BSE: 509567; NSE: GOACARBON
- ISIN: INE426D01013
- Industry: Petrochemicals
- Founded: 1967
- Headquarters: Panaji, Goa
- Key people: Shrinivas Dempo (Chairman)
- Revenue: USD 29.3 million (2015)
- Total assets: USD 37.8 million (2015)
- Number of employees: 216 (as of 31 March 2017)
- Parent: Dempo
- Website: www.goacarbon.com

Goa Carbon Limited is an Indian petrochemical company and is engaged in the manufacture and sale of Calcined Petroleum Coke. It is a public company listed on the Bombay Stock Exchange and National Stock Exchange and is the second largest producer of Calcined Petroleum Coke in India. Other specialty consumer segments include titanium dioxide and other chemicals. The company's calcination plant is located approximately 40 kilometers from the Mormugoa Port. It was incorporated and established on 22 June 1967. It has manufacturing facilities in Goa, Paradip and Bilaspur. Total capacity is 1,65,000 MT per annum.

== Products ==
- Calcined Petroleum Coke
- Recarburiser
- Laddle additive
- Carbon raiser

== Achievements ==
Goa Carbon's plant is ISO 9001:2008 by Bureau Veritas. It is also ISO 14001:2004 certified.
