= Paradeep =

Industrial Port City in Odisha, India

Paradeep Paradip
- Smart Port City Of Odisha
- Paradweep
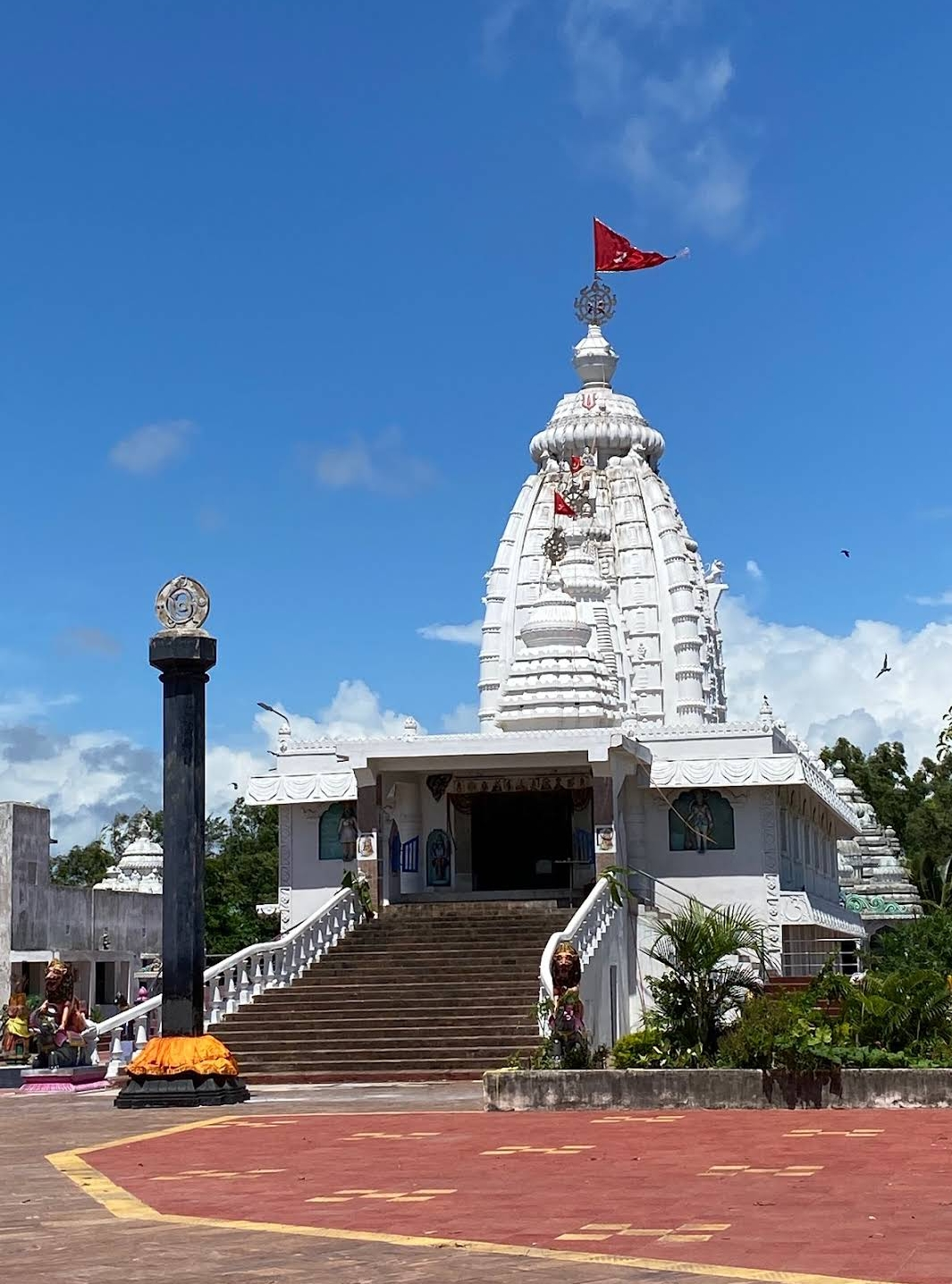
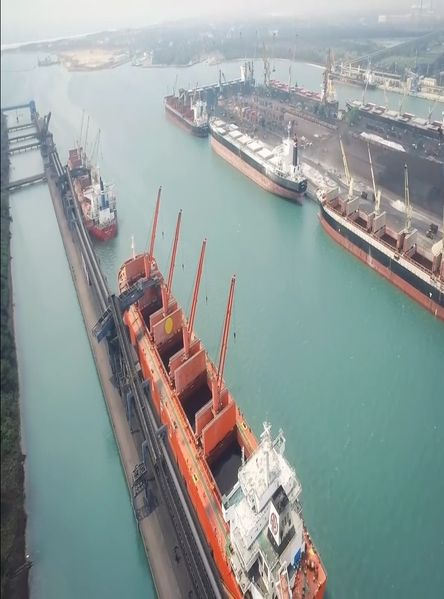
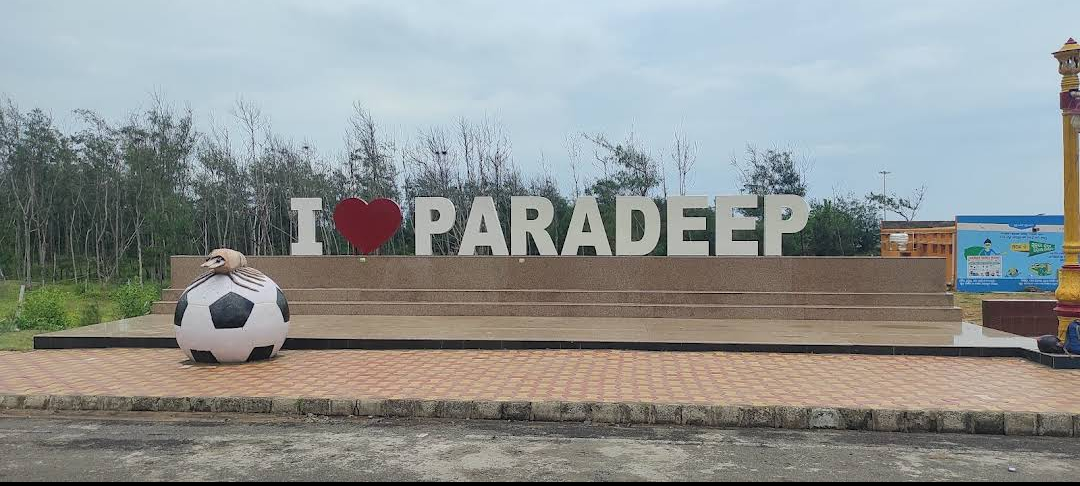
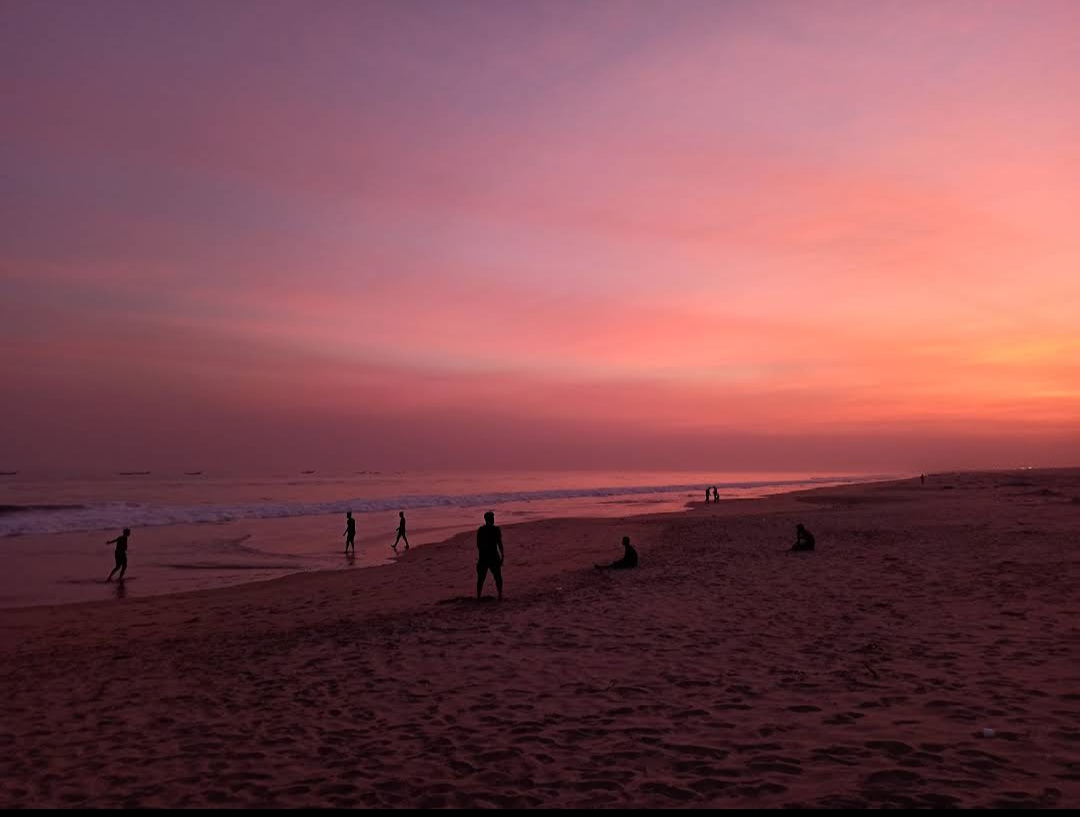
- Clockwise from top left: Shri Jagannath Temple, Paradip Port, Paradip Sea Beach, 'I LOVE PARADEEP' sign at Paradip Beach

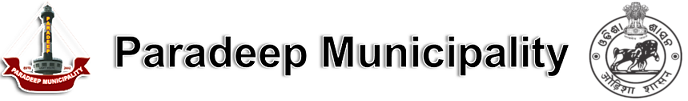
- Nicknames: Smart Industrial Port City
- Location in Odisha, India Paradeep (India) Paradeep (Asia)
- Coordinates: 20.316°N 86.610°E
- Country: India
- State: Odisha
- District: Jagatsinghpur
- Established: 3 January 1962
- Founder: Pandit Jawaharlal Nehru

Government
  - Type: Municipality
  - Body: Paradeep Municipality
  - Chairman: Sri Basanta Biswal

Area
  - Total: 105 km^{2} (41 sq mi)
- Elevation: 1 m (3.3 ft)

Population (2011)
  - Total: 68,585
  - Density: 653/km^{2} (1,690/sq mi)
- Demonym: Paradipians

Languages
  - Official: Odia
- Time zone: UTC+5:30 (IST)
- Postal code: 754142
- Vehicle registration: OD-21 (JAGATSINGHPUR)

Paradeep, also spelled Paradip (originally Paradweep, also spelled Paradwip), is an industrial seaport city and municipality, nearly 90 km from Cuttack city, in Jagatsinghpur district of Odisha, India. Paradeep was constituted as an NAC on 27 September 1979 and converted into a municipality on 12 December 2002. The nearest commercial airport is Biju Patnaik International Airport.

The municipality comprises five Revenue Villages, namely Udachandrapur, Chauliapalanda, Sandhakuda, Bijayachandrapur, and Bhitaragarh. Given the increasing population and industrialisation, a proposal to include 15 villages (Paradeep, Garh, Niharuni, Niharuni Kandha, Chouki Matha, Udayabata, Nimidiha, Kotakula, Rangiagarh, Nua Sandhakud, Musadiha, Musadiha Jangle, Boitarkuda, Kaudia, Aganaasi, and Nuagarh) was sent to the state H. & U.D. Department in 2007.

Companies established in Paradeep include IFFCO, Paradeep Phosphates Limited, Indian Oil Corporation, Bharat Petroleum, Hindustan Petroleum, Numaligarh Refinery Limited and Goa Carbon Limited.

== History ==
During the early 17th century, Paradip and its adjoining areas were connected to Cuttack through the Mahanadi river and its branches. Goods were transported to Cuttack from rural areas via the Brahmani and Dhamra rivers, although this was gradually discontinued due to silting of the river bed.

In 1819, the British constructed a harbour called False Point, north of the present site of Paradip. In 1862, the East India Irrigation Company explored the potential of Paradip for the transportation of rice from the area. The importance of Paradip grew during the great famine of 1866 when it was used as the main entry point for importing food materials into the famine-struck area.

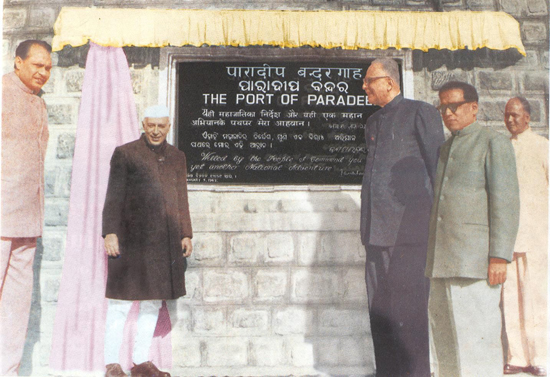
Inauguration of Paradip Port

During the early post-independence period, a minor port came into existence at Paradip in 1958 through the efforts of the State Government. Subsequently, the Government decided to construct a major port there. The foundation stone for Paradip Port was laid on 3 January 1962 by Pandit Jawaharlal Nehru, then Prime Minister of India. On completion in 1965, the port was taken over by the Government of India and was declared open on 12 March 1966. Paradip Port was declared the eighth major port of India and the first major deep sea port on the east coast commissioned after independence. The Paradip Port Trust came into being in 1967 for the development and management of the Port.

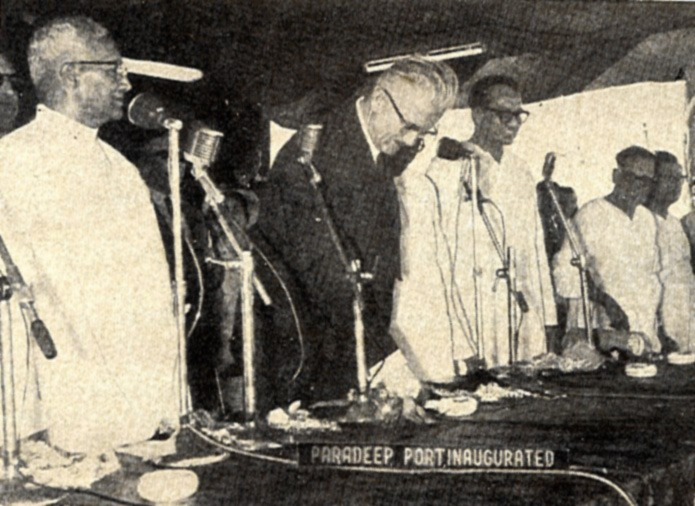

== Geography ==
Paradip is located at 20.16°N 86.40°E. It has an average elevation of 1 m (3.3 ft).

== Climate ==
Climate data for Paradeep (1991–2020, extremes 1969–2012)
Month	Jan	Feb	Mar	Apr	May	Jun	Jul	Aug	Sep	Oct	Nov	Dec	Year
Record high °C (°F)	33.2 (91.8)	36.2 (97.2)	39.3 (102.7)	40.7 (105.3)	41.4 (106.5)	42.4 (108.3)	38.0 (100.4)	39.2 (102.6)	36.4 (97.5)	36.0 (96.8)	34.0 (93.2)	32.6 (90.7)	42.4 (108.3)
Mean daily maximum °C (°F)	26.9 (80.4)	29.1 (84.4)	31.1 (88.0)	32.1 (89.8)	32.9 (91.2)	32.5 (90.5)	31.5 (88.7)	31.5 (88.7)	32.0 (89.6)	31.9 (89.4)	30.1 (86.2)	27.9 (82.2)	30.8 (87.4)
Mean daily minimum °C (°F)	16.6 (61.9)	20.1 (68.2)	24.0 (75.2)	26.1 (79.0)	27.2 (81.0)	27.4 (81.3)	26.6 (79.9)	26.6 (79.9)	26.6 (79.9)	24.9 (76.8)	20.8 (69.4)	17.1 (62.8)	23.6 (74.5)
Record low °C (°F)	9.6 (49.3)	12.0 (53.6)	13.4 (56.1)	16.0 (60.8)	17.5 (63.5)	18.5 (65.3)	18.1 (64.6)	17.8 (64.0)	19.6 (67.3)	16.0 (60.8)	12.0 (53.6)	10.4 (50.7)	9.6 (49.3)
Average rainfall mm (inches)	11.1 (0.44)	11.4 (0.45)	26.2 (1.03)	30.5 (1.20)	104.2 (4.10)	204.8 (8.06)	322.5 (12.70)	380.1 (14.96)	320.2 (12.61)	233.0 (9.17)	75.6 (2.98)	11.9 (0.47)	1,731.4 (68.17)
Average rainy days	0.7	0.9	1.1	2.1	4.0	8.9	13.3	13.8	11.4	7.7	2.4	0.7	66.9
Average relative humidity (%) (at 17:30 IST)	70	74	78	83	82	82	84	84	83	78	71	68	78
Source: India Meteorological Department

== Transport ==
Paradeep is on National Highway 53 and State Highway No. 12, and is also served by the broad-gauge electrified railway system of the East coast. Bus routes connect it to Rourkela, Kolkata, Puri, and Konark. It is also connected to Cuttack by bus and train.

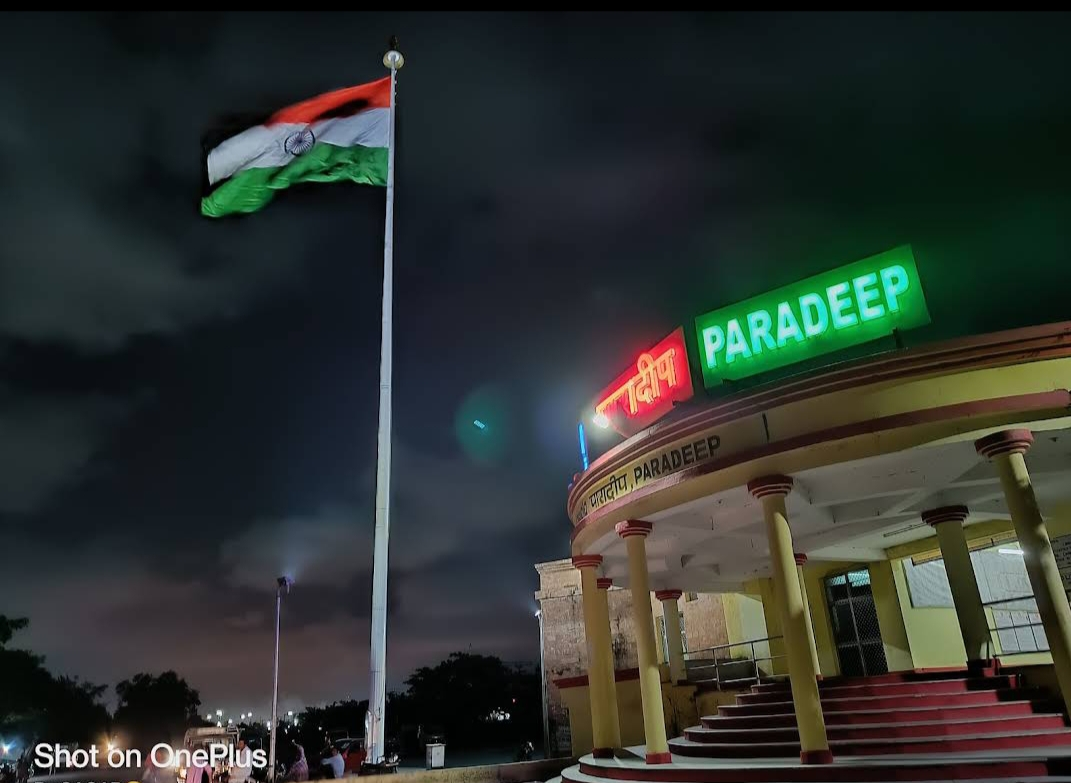
Paradeep Railway Station

== Paradip Port ==
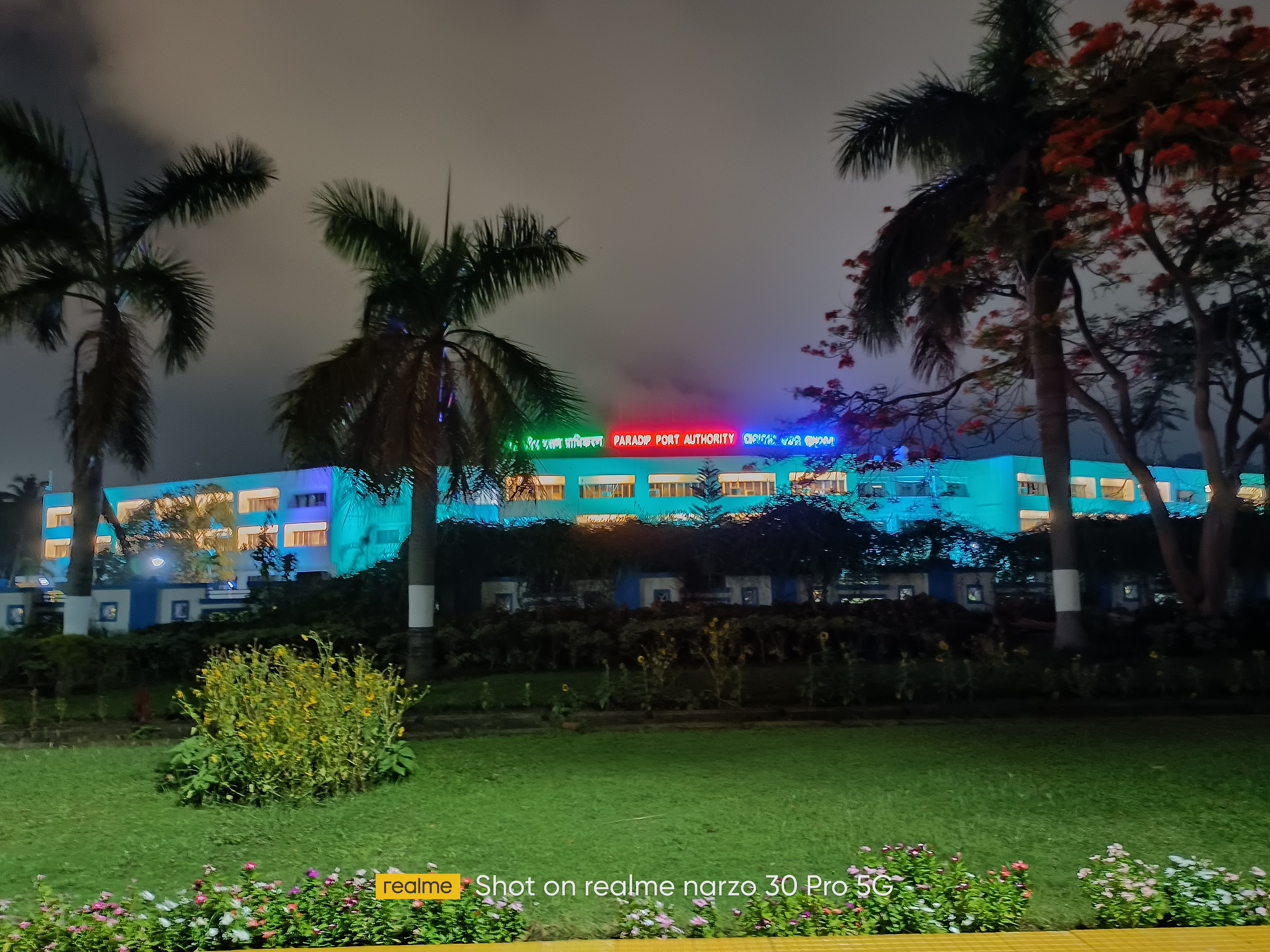
Paradip Port Administrative Building

The Port of Paradip is the primary port in Odisha, and one of the largest on India's east coast. Located on the Bay of Bengal at a latitude of 20° 55.44' N and a longitude of 86°34.62' E, the port is built on an artificial harbour, with ships accessing the port via human-made lagoons. The port handled over 100 million tonnes of cargo in 2017–2018, notably thermal coal and iron ore.

The port's 55,000 m^{2} (590,000 sq ft) of paved concrete storage area can hold about 1000 TEUs (20 ft). It has three mobile cranes, an in-house stuffing/destuffing facility, a siding facility, an RO-RO jetty, and single-point mooring.

== Industry ==
Major industries in Paradip include:

- Paradip Refinery, which is under Indian Oil Corporation Limited, is a major oil refinery in Paradip with a capacity of 15 million tonnes per year
- Paradeep Phosphates Limited, a fertilizer company
- Multi Modal Logistics Park, Container Corporation of India Limited
- Paradeep Plastic Park Limited
- Goa Carbon Ltd.'s petroleum coke calcination plant, with a capacity of 1,68,000 TPA
- IFFCO's fertilizer plant
- Essar Steel's pellet plant
- IOCL marketing terminal
- BPCL marketing terminal
- HPCL marketing terminal.
- Cargill's edible oil plant
- Skol Breweries Ltd.'s East Coast Brewery

Paradeep has several upcoming steel plants, including a US$12 billion plant being developed by POSCO of South Korea. In addition, aluminium refineries, thermal power plants, and a petrochemical complex are under development.

Paradeep has been identified for development as one of the six major Petroleum, Chemicals and Petrochemicals Investment Regions (PCPIRs) in India. The Paradeep PCPIR has identified an investment potential of US$68.84 billion, spread over 284 square kilometres (110 mi^{2}) in the area.

== Demographics ==
As of the 2001 Indian census, Paradip had a population of 73,633. The population was 58% male and 42% female, due to rapid migration of young industrial workers to the area. Paradeep has an average literacy rate of 73%, higher than the national average of 59.5%; male literacy is 79%, and female literacy is 65%. 12% of the population is under 6 years of age.

=== Languages ===
Languages spoken in Paradip Town (2011)
1. Odia (71.1%)
2. Bengali (13.7%)
3. Telugu (9.00%)
4. Hindi (1.97%)
5. Santali (1.68%)
6. Others (2.55%)

== See also ==
- Paradip Industrial Estate
