= Kandla–Bhatinda Oil Pipeline =

Oil pipeline in India

Location
- Country: India
- Start: Kandla
- Passes through: Panipat
- To: Bhatinda

General information
- Type: Oil products
- Operator: Indian Oil Corporation
- Commissioned: 1996

Technical information
- Length: 1,443 km (897 mi)
- Maximum discharge: 6 million metric tons per annum

Kandla–Bhatinda Oil Pipeline (KBPL) was started in 1993 and it was commissioned in 1996. It is the largest oil pipeline in India. However, the first engineering firm to work on the project, Škoda Export, did not complete the job and fresh bids had to be taken in 1996. The total length is 1443 km with a capacity of 6.0 million tonnes per year. It was recommissioned later the same year. The pipeline transports oil brought into India to consumers of North India which is land locked. The pipeline is owned by Indian Oil Corporation. Initially, it was a product pipeline. Now it is a crude oil pipeline from Kandla to Panipat and subsequently it is a product pipeline up to Bhatinda.

Due to increasing demand for petroleum products in the North-West region of the country in the late 1990s, the pipeline capacity was scheduled to be increased to 8.8 MMT by May 2000. now, Kandla-Bhatinda pipeline is known as Mundra panipath pipeline The 1194 km long Mundra Panipat Pipeline was commissioned to transport crude oil from Mundra on the Gujarat coast to IndianOil's refinery at Panipat in Haryana. The pipeline consists of a 74 km long pipeline from Mundra to Kandla which was hooked up to the existing system of Kandla-Panipat section of Kandla-Bhatinda Pipeline at Churwa near Gandhidham. The pipeline utilizes Gujarat Adani Port's Single Point Mooring (SPM) offshore crude oil terminal facilities and associated offshore and onshore pipelines. The crude oil tank farm consists of 12 crude oil storage tanks with total capacity of 0.499 MMT at Mundra.
