= Paradip Refinery =

Oil refinery in Odisha, India

- Location of the Paradip Refinery in Odisha Paradip Refinery (India)
- Location: Paradip, Odisha, India; 20°14′51.5″N 86°35′53.5″E

Refinery details
- Owner: Indian Oil Corporation Limited
- Opened: 2016
- Capacity: 300,000 barrels per day (48,000 m^{3}/d)

Paradip Refinery is an oil refinery set up by Indian Oil Corporation in Paradip town in the state of Odisha. It was commissioned in 2016 with an installed capacity of 15 million tonnes per year. This refinery is spread over approximately 3,345 acres of land and is situated approximately 5 km southwest from the Paradip Port.

== History ==
The project of this refinery was put forward in 1995 and was approved by the government in 1998. The foundation stone for this refinery was laid by former Prime Minister Atal Bihari Vajpayee in May 2000. The project suffered several delays because of withdrawal of tax and a fall in the oil market. Final approval for this project was given by the board of IOCL in February 2009. The project for this refinery was actually expected to be established by March 2012 and become completely functional by November 2012, but the operation of this project got delayed due to financial limitation, and finally the refinery was inaugurated in February 2016.

Paradip Refinery is IndianOil's 11th Refinery. It was dedicated in the service of the nation by PM Shri Narendra Modi on February 7, 2016. Envisioned as the Energy Gateway to Eastern India, the 15 million tonnes per year Refinery has been set up at an estimated cost of Rs. 52,555 crore.

== Commissioning ==
The refinery expected to start production in the third quarter of 2013. Due to delays the cost of refinery project has increased by 2.5%. It was finally inaugurated by Prime Minister Narendra Modi on February 7, 2016.

The refinery is built at a cost of Rs 34,555 crore and can process dirty and heavy crude oil from Latin America.

This refinery can produce a lot of petroleum products including, petrol, diesel, liquified petroleum gas, aviation turbine fuel, kerosene, sulphur, and petroleum coke.

The refinery sent out its first consignment of products comprising diesel, kerosene, LPG on November 22, 2015.

At present the refinery is fully operational and is producing BS-VI complaint Fuel. A petrochemical complex comprising PP units, ERU-MEG Unit and PX-PTA Units are also coming up under the Petchem Complex

A Polypropylene Plant is also commissioned in FY 2019–20 in the refinery Premises and PP product is also being Produced.

ERU-MEG Unit is planned for commissioning in FY:2021-22. PX-PTA PROJECT is slated for commissioning in FY 2023-24

This refinery is the first refinery of IndianOil with single Atmospheric Column to process 15 Million Metric Tonnes Per Annum.

Safety concerns about the environment is taken by this refinery like, this refinery discharges zero effluent and with strictly controlled and monitored stack emissions which are uplinked to the server of Central Pollution Control Board.

The South Oil Jetty, situated within Paradip Port, is used by IOCL for importing crude oil and exporting petroleum products from the refinery.

== State support ==
The Government of Odisha has announced nil sales tax on the refinery products for the period of 11 years.

== IOCL Paradip Refinery Township ==
It is a private residential area spread over an area of 197 acres, composed of bungalows and housing quarters for the employees of Paradip Refinery. Facilities like estate complex, hospital, clubs, community center, bank, school, swimming pool, guest house, horticultural nursery, market complex, temple, children parks, stadium, well maintained parks, lawns etc. are available here.

External videos
- YouTube
- Paradip Refinery Township
