= Lanka IOC =

Sri Lankan subsidiary of Indian Oil Corporation

Lanka IOC PLC
- The logo of Lanka IOC
- Type: Public
- Traded as: CSE: LIOC.N0000
- ISIN: LK0345N00005
- Industry: Energy
- Founded: 2002; 24 years ago
- Headquarters: Colombo, Sri Lanka
- Key people: Anuj Jain (Chairman); Dipak Das (Managing Director)
- Products: Fuels; Lubricants; Bitumen; other petrochemicals
- Revenue: ▲LKR281.49 billion (FY 2022-23)
- Operating income: ▲LKR44.1 billion (FY 2022-23)
- Net income: ▲LKR37.6 billion (FY 2022-23)
- Total assets: ▲LKR82.2 billion (FY 2022-23)
- Total equity: ▲LKR61.2 billion (FY 2022-23)
- Owner: Indian Oil Corporation Limited (75.12%); J B Cocoshell (Pvt) Ltd (3.00%); Ceybank Unit Trust (1.13%)
- Number of employees: 159 (FY 2022-23)
- Parent: Indian Oil Corporation Limited
- Website: lankaioc.com

Lanka IOC PLC is a subsidiary of Indian Oil Corporation which operates retail petrol and diesel stations in Sri Lanka. LIOC was Sri Lanka's first private sector organisation retailing fuels. As of 2017 LIOC operated an island-wide distribution network of 213 retail outlets. Its headquartered in the Colombo City, Colombo.

== History ==
The company was incorporated in 2003 as LIOC. Indian parent company Indian Oil Company owned the majority of LIOC's stock, and N.K Nayyar served as its first chairman. Before 2002, petroleum fuel retailing in the country was at the rudimentary level, limited to mere sales of auto fuel only. After the 2002 Sri Lankan Government's decision to liberalise the petroleum sector where the CPC will compete with the private sector. Indian Oil Corporation, will invest Rs. 10 billion (US$62 million for the first phase, US$38 million would be invested in the second phase) in Sri Lanka and will operate 100 fuel stations which it has purchased from the Ceylon Petroleum Corporation In 2003, Sri Lankan Government give to 15 Trincomalee oil tanks, on a 35 years lease for an annual payment of US$100,000. In 2022 Sri Lankan cabinet approved to implementation of a development project by a company named Trinco Petroleum Terminal for the remaining 61 tanks, of which 51% will be owned by CEYPTCO and 49% by LIOC. Trincomalee oil tanks farm is estimated to be valued at US$500 million. The event became known as the 2022 Sri Lankan economic crisis Sri Lanka has faced energy crisis. With no foreign exchange to pay for fuel, Sri Lanka Government was dependent on an Indian line of credit of US$700 million which expired in June. The LIOC to date was enjoying a 16% market share for petrol and diesel in the local market. For lubricants, bitumen and oil bunkering its market share is over 35%. The fuel shortfalls have also led to long lines at petrol and diesel stations over the past months. IOC supply is supported by an Indian Line of Credit of US$500 million. In August 2022 Sri Lanka's Ministry of Power and Energy has authorised the establishment of 50 new fuel stations by Lanka IOC.

== Listing and shareholding ==
Lanka IOC's equity shares are listed on the Colombo Stock Exchange.

== Finances ==
Year	Revenue (mil. LKR)	Net income (mil. LKR)	Total assets (mil. LKR)	Employees
2003	1,306	78		202
2004	14,533	588		214
2005	27,586	2,331		201
2006	37,493	−1,18		202
2007	32,796	−636		170
2008	44,173	2,516	23,959	170
2009	47,617	−1,104	20,453	171
2010	50,214	−397	17,423	172
2011	51,743	893	18,988	173
2012	60,436	930	22,122	171
2013	75,111	2,909	24,700	175
2014	81,793	4,813	26,984	177
2015	79,901	1,886	23,541	174
2016	71,307	2,239	25,068	172
2017	81,039	3,065	25,494	172
2018	91,343	−744	32,959	172
2019	86,322	403	28,245	172
2020	81,947	422	39,760	164
2021	66,686	883	46,407	151
2022	89,951	4,818	65,070	153
