= Manali Refinery =

Oil refinery in Tamil Nadu, India

- The location of the Manali Refinery in Tamil Nadu Manali Refinery (India)
- Location: Manali, Chennai, Tamil Nadu, India; 13°09′37.6″N 80°16′39.1″E

Refinery details
- Owner: Chennai Petroleum Corporation Limited
- Opened: 1969
- Capacity: 10.5 MMTPA

Manali Refinery is an oil refinery operated by Chennai Petroleum Corporation, it operates in Manali, Chennai in the state of Tamil Nadu since 1969. It is said to be one of the oldest refineries in southern India. It has a capacity of 10.5 million tonnes per year and is capable to produce fuel, lube, wax, petrochemical feedstocks, Liquefied Petroleum Gas, Motor Spirit, High Speed Diesel, Superior Kerosene Oil, Aviation Turbine Fuel.
