= Panipat Refinery =

Oil refinery in Haryana, India

Panipat Refinery & Petrochemical Complex
- Interactive map of Panipat Refinery & Petrochemical Complex
- Location: Baholi, Panipat, Haryana, India; 29°28′15.4″N 76°52′20.1″E

Refinery details
- Owner: Indian Oil Corporation Limited
- Opened: 1998
- Capacity: 15 million tonnes/year

Panipat Refinery is an oil refinery located in Baholi, Panipat, Haryana, India. It was set up in 1998. Panipat Refinery is the seventh refinery belonging to Indian Oil Corporation Limited. It is one of South Asia's largest integrated petrochemicals plants. Panipat Refinery meets the demand of petroleum products of Haryana and of the entire North-West Region including Punjab, J&K, Himachal, Chandigarh, Uttaranchal state and part of Rajasthan & Delhi. Bedgsing younger of the Indian Oil refineries it houses refining technologies from Axens; France, Haldor-Topsoe; Denmark, UOP; USA, Stone & Webster; USA and Delta Hudson-Canada, Dupont, USA and ABB Luumas. The original cost of the refinery's construction was Rs 3868 Crores. It commenced with a capacity of 6 million tonnes per year and has been recently augmented to 12 million tonnes per year at a cost of Rs 4165 Crores. The refinery is designed to handle both indigenous and imported crudes. It receives crude through the Salaya Mathura Pipeline which also supplies crude to Mathura and Baroda refineries.

== Refining units ==
In addition to crude and vacuum distillation units, the major refining units are catalytic reforming unit, once-through Hydrocracker unit, Resid Fluidised Catalytic Cracking unit, visbreaker unit, delayed coking unit, bitumen blowing unit, hydrogen generation unit, sulphur block and associated auxiliary facilities. In order to produce low sulphur diesel, a Diesel Hydro Desulphurisation Unit (DHDS) was commissioned in 1999.

== Petrochemical units ==
The refinery also houses PX-PTA units which were commissioned in June 2006. They produce paraxylene and PTA. PTA is a useful raw material for producing other commercial polymers. It produces Benzene as one of the by products.

Expanding its presence in petrochemical space, Indian Oil has commissioned a Naphtha Cracker Complex adjacent to Panipat refinery complex at a project cost of Rs 14439 Crores. It produces ethylene and propylene, which are further used to produce polymers like polypropylene, low/high-density polyethylene and monoethylene glycol

Panipat Refinery has been further augmented with an additional capacity of 3 million tonnes per year, taking the total capacity to 15 million tonnes per year. With Euro VI/BS 6 norms in place, Panipat Refinery is a large contributor of ultra low sulphur diesel for Indian Oil.

== Highlights ==
The refinery's highlights include:

- Zero discharge of effluent gases
- The presence of four ambient air monitoring stations that were in place well before the refinery was in use
- It is an eco-friendly refinery, as indicated by a green belt outside it
- The establishment of a totally electronic-based communication system within the refinery
- It has the lowest manpower of all refineries in the region with similar capacities
