= Indane-5-sulfonamide =

Names
- Preferred IUPAC name 2,3-Dihydro-1H-indene-5-sulfonamide

Identifiers
CAS Number	35203-93-1
3D model (JSmol)	Interactive image
ChEMBL	ChEMBL364869
ChemSpider	87470
DrugBank	DB08165
ECHA InfoCard	100.047.651
EC Number	252-432-6
PubChem CID	96876
UNII	XJL3C99615
CompTox Dashboard (EPA)	DTXSID40188710
- InChI: InChI=1S/C9H11NO2S/c10-13(11,12)9-5-4-7-2-1-3-8(7)6-9/h4-6H,1-3H2,(H2,10,11,12) Key: XVQJTFMKKZBBSX-UHFFFAOYSA-N
- SMILES: c1cc2c(cc1S(=O)(=O)N)CCC2

Properties
Chemical formula	C_{9}H_{11}NO_{2}S
Molar mass	197.25 g·mol^{−1}

Hazards
- GHS labelling
Pictograms	(GHS07: Exclamation mark)
Signal word	Warning
Hazard statements	H302, H315, H319, H335
Precautionary statements	P261, P264, P270, P271, P280, P301+P312, P302+P352, P304+P340, P305+P351+P338, P312, P321, P330, P332+P313, P337+P313, P362, P403+P233, P405, P501
- Except where otherwise noted, data are given for materials in their standard state (at 25 °C [77 °F], 100 kPa). Infobox references

Indane-5-sulfonamide is the base structure of indanesulfonamides. Indane-5-sulfonamide is a carbonic anhydrase inhibitor.

== Notes ==
Carbonic anhydrase inhibitors: binding of indanesulfonamides to the human isoform II
