= Nagapattnam Refinery =

Decommissioned oil refinery in Tamil Nadu, India

The Nagapattnam Refinery, also known as Cauvery Basin Refinery, was the second oil refinery constructed by Chennai Petroleum Corporation Limited. It is situated at Kaveri Basin at Nagapattinam. The initial unit was set up in Nagapattinam with a capacity of 0.5 million metric tonnes per annum in 1993 but later on in 2002 this was boosted to 1 million metric tonnes per annum. LPG is separated out in a gas treating unit built in 1996. It was decommissioned on 1 April 2019 due to limitations in meeting the required product specifications with its existing configuration and a new 9 million tonnes per annum (MMTPA) refinery and petrochemical complex has been proposed at the site of the former refinery.
