= Mancheswar Industrial Estate =

Industrial and commercial area located

Coordinates: 20°18′26″N 85°51′14″E

Mancheswar Industrial Estate is an industrial and commercial area located in Bhubaneswar, in the Khordha district of Odisha, India. It was developed and is administered by the Odisha Industrial Infrastructure Development Corporation (IDCO), a statutory body established in 1981 for the development of industrial infrastructure in the state. The estate is connected to major transport routes, including National Highway 16 and Mancheswar railway station. It accommodates various industrial and commercial units, such as engineering and fabrication industries, warehousing facilities, and logistics offices. The area also includes institutions related to vocational training, including the National Skill Training Institute (NSTI), which functions under a Government of India programme. In addition to industrial activities, the estate contains supporting infrastructure such as residential facilities, retail establishments, and healthcare services.
