= Indian Oil Corporation =

Indian multinational oil and gas company

Indian Oil Corporation Limited
- Trade name: IndianOil
- Type: Public
- Traded as: BSE: 530965; NSE: IOC
- ISIN: INE242A01010
- Industry: Oil and gas
- Predecessor: Indian Refineries Ltd. (1958); Indian Oil Corporation (1959)
- Founded: 30 June 1959; 67 years ago
- Headquarters: New Delhi, India (headquarters); Mumbai, Maharashtra, India (registered office)
- Area served: India, Sri Lanka, Middle East, Mauritius
- Key people: Arvindar Singh Sahney, Chairman
- Products: LNG; Lubricants; Natural gas; Petrochemicals; Petroleum
- Services: Petroleum refining, Pipeline transport, Petroleum marketing & distribution, Petrochemicals, Natural gas, Exploration & production, Renewable & alternative energy, Research & development, Lubricants
- Revenue: ▲₹901,453 crore (US$96 billion) (2026)
- Operating income: ▲₹57,472 crore (US$6.1 billion) (2026)
- Net income: ▲₹43,677 crore (US$4.7 billion) (2026)
- Total assets: ▲₹528,956 crore (US$57 billion) (2026)
- Total equity: ▲₹204,544 crore (US$22 billion) (2026)
- Number of employees: 29,650 (2026)
- Divisions: IndianOil (Mauritius) Limited; Lanka IOC PLC; IOC Middle East FZE
- Subsidiaries: Indane (LPG); Chennai Petroleum Corporation Limited; Petronet LNG
- Website: www.iocl.com

Indian Oil Corporation Limited (IOCL), (d/b/a IndianOil) is an Indian multinational oil and gas company under the ownership of the Government of India and administrative control of the Ministry of Petroleum and Natural Gas. It is a public sector undertaking which is registered in Mumbai and headquartered in New Delhi. It is the largest government-owned oil producer in the country both in terms of capacity and revenue. It has consolidated refining capacity of 80.55MMTPA.

Indian Oil's business interests overlap the entire hydrocarbon value chain, including refining, pipeline, marketing of petroleum products, exploration and production of Petroleum, natural gas and petrochemicals. Indian Oil has ventured into renewable energy and globalisation of downstream operations. It has subsidiaries in Sri Lanka (Lanka IOC), Mauritius (IndianOil (Mauritius) Ltd), and the Middle East (IOC Middle East FZE).

Indian Oil is ranked 94th on the Fortune Global 500 list of the world's biggest corporations as of 2022. As of 31 March 2021, Indian Oil has 31,648 employees, out of which 17,762 are executives and 13,876 non-executives, while 2,776 are women.

== History ==
In May 2018, IOCL became India's most profitable government corporation for the second consecutive year, with a record profit of ₹21,346 crores in 2017–18. In February 2020, the company signed a deal with the Russian oil company Rosneft to buy 140,000 barrels per day of crude in year 2020. By 1 April 2020, IndianOil was in absolute readiness to launch BS-VI (Bharat Stage VI) fuels in all its retail outlets in Telangana and adopt world-class emission norms.

In January 2021, sales were registered at an all-time high of 410,000 barrels of oil per day till 26 January 2021. Delek, QatarEnergy, and Saudi Aramco are its largest business partners, with Abu Dhabi National Oil Company and National Iranian Oil Company signing deals to deliver high production output by the end of 2020.

In March 2022, Apollo Hospitals replaced Indian Oil Corporation in Nifty 50 benchmark index.

In November 2026, Indian Oil's 30,000-tonnes-per-annum sustainable aviation fuel plant at its Panipat refinery in Haryana, the first commercial-scale SAF plant in India, produced its first batch of fuel from used cooking oil and received the approvals needed to start commercial production, including India's first ISCC CORSIA certification for SAF production. The plant was expected to meet nearly the entire SAF requirement for India in 2027 under the government's indicative blending targets of 1 per cent in 2027, 2 per cent in 2028 and 5 per cent in 2030 for international flights.

== Operations ==
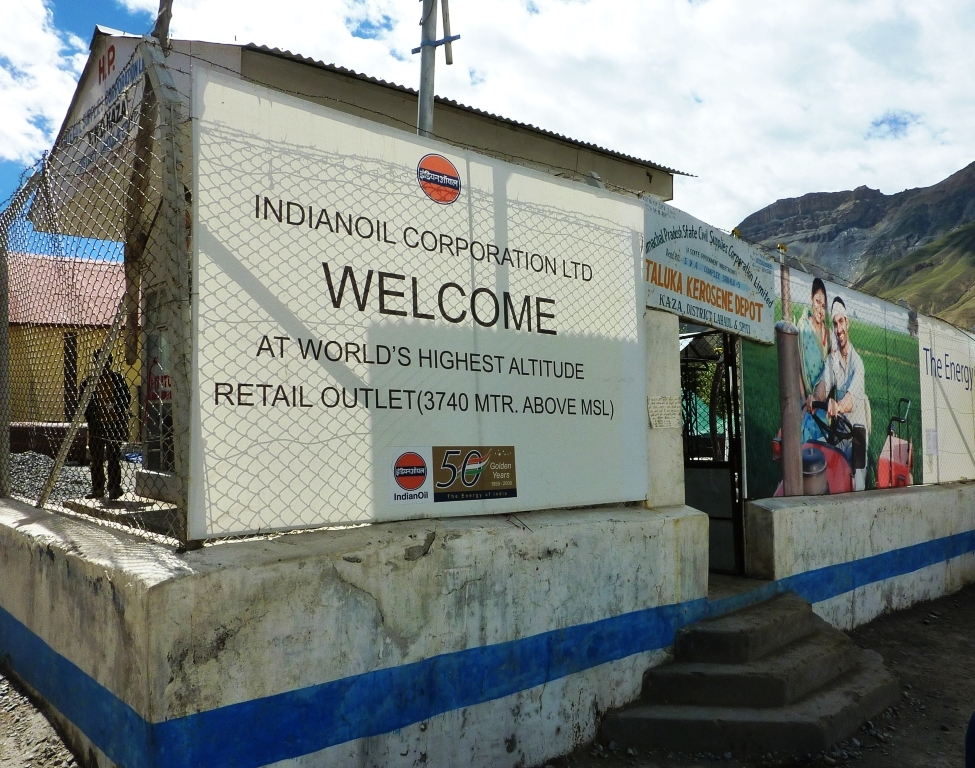
The world's highest retail outlet (at an altitude of 3,740 mtr. above mean sea level) under IOCL, in Kaza, Himachal Pradesh

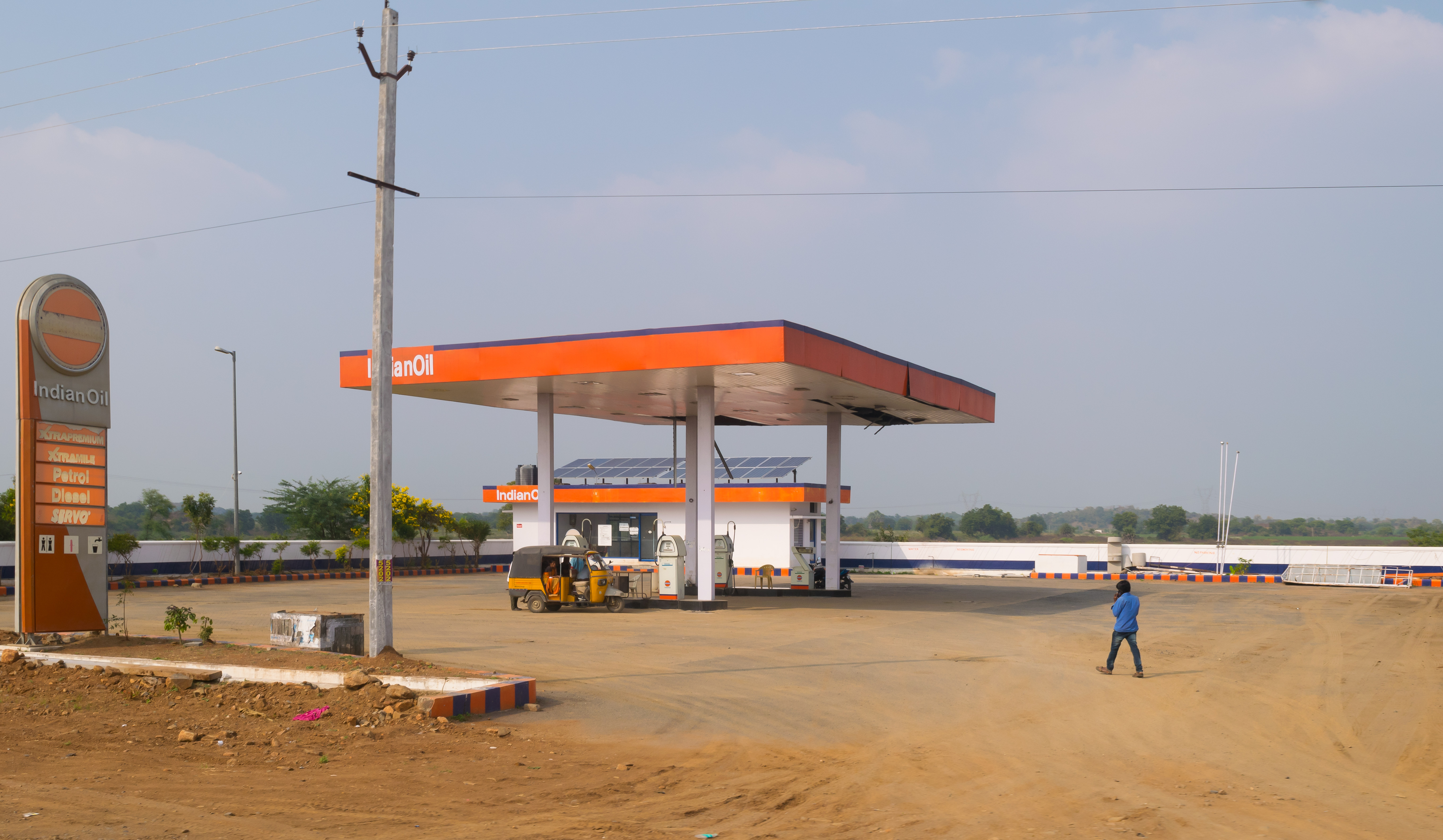
IOCL Petrol Pump under construction in Khammam

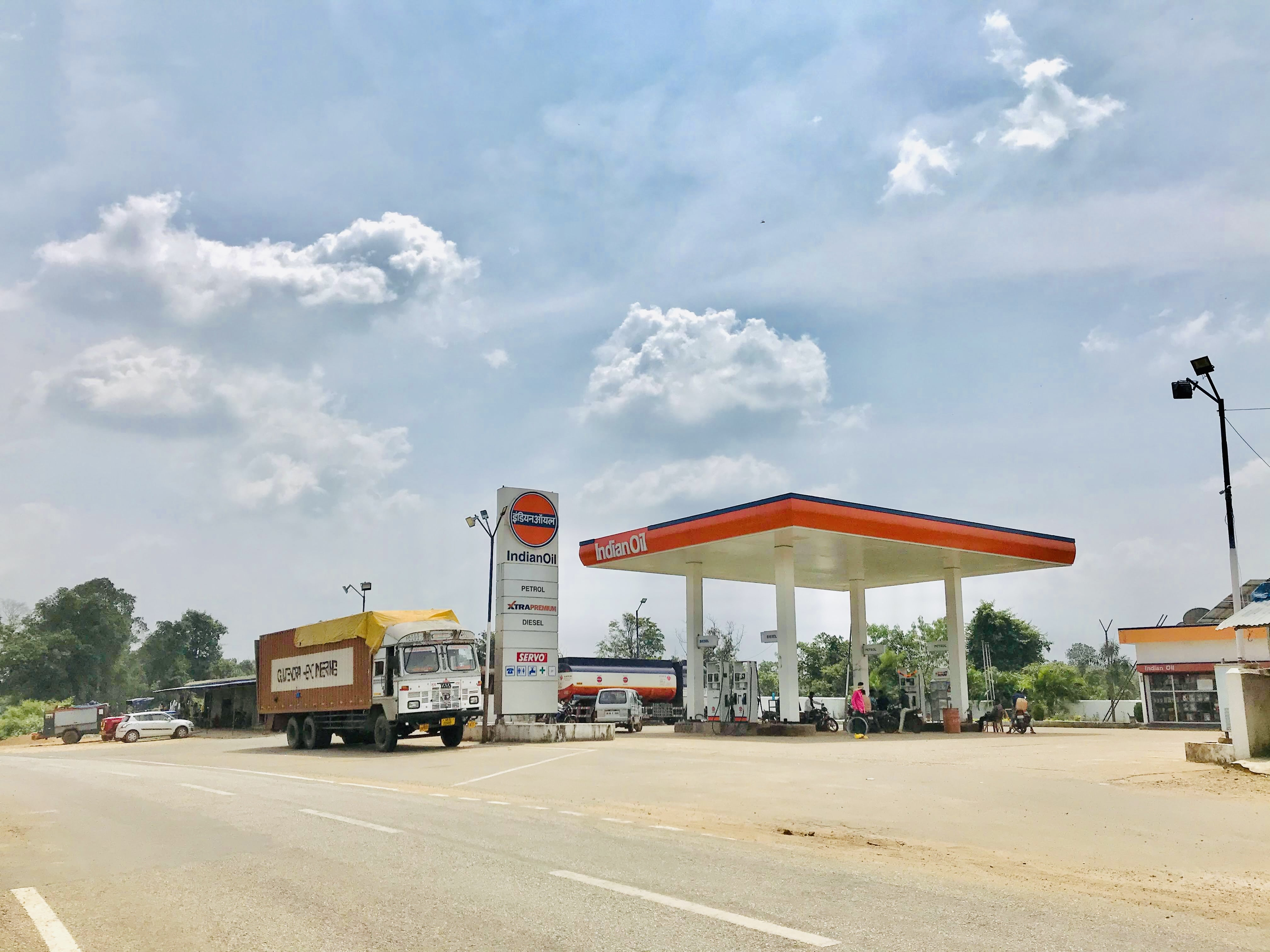
An Indian Oil Fueling Station in Kapsi, Chhattisgarh

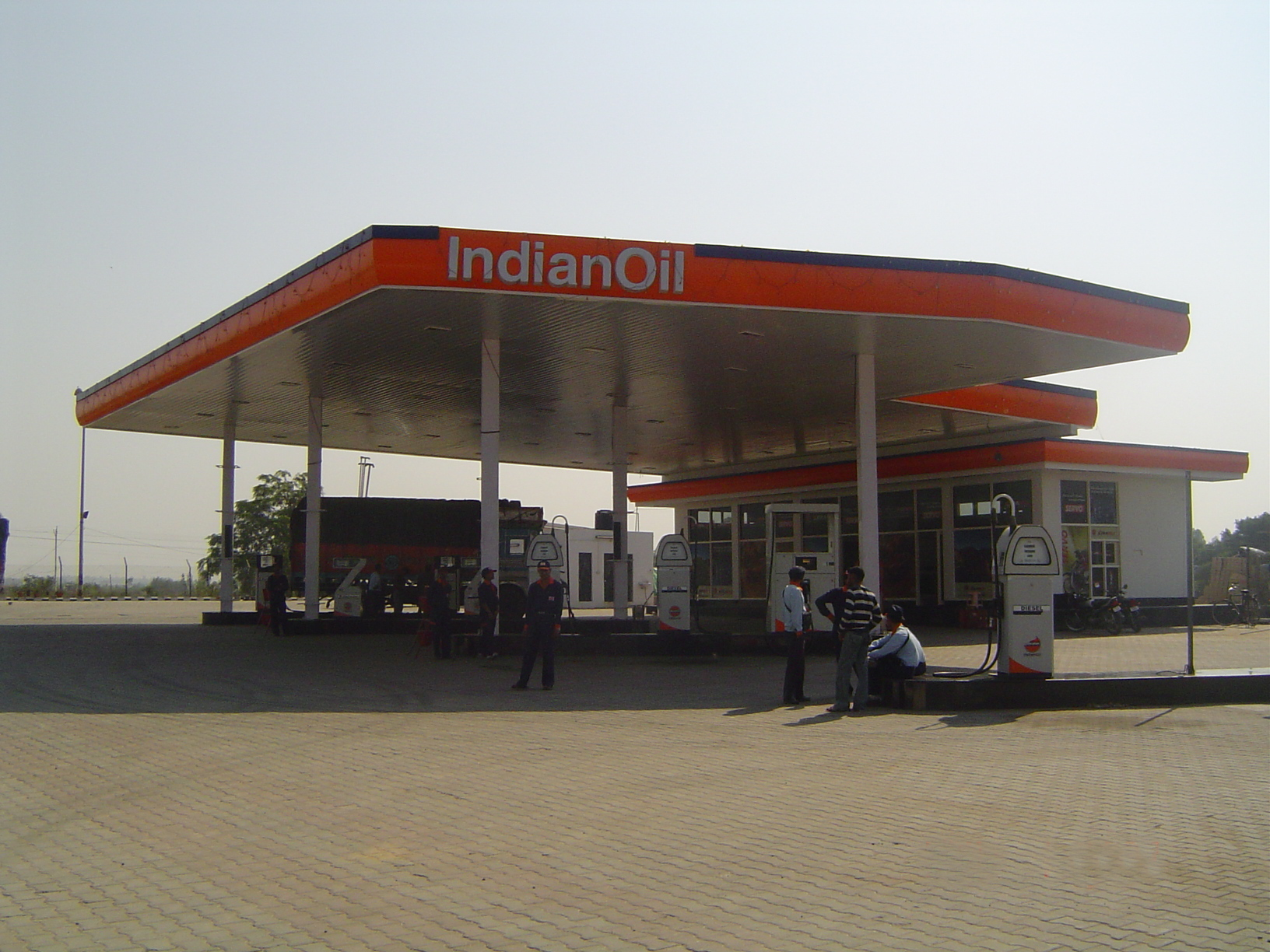
An Indian Oil Petrol pump near Dera Bassi in Punjab, India

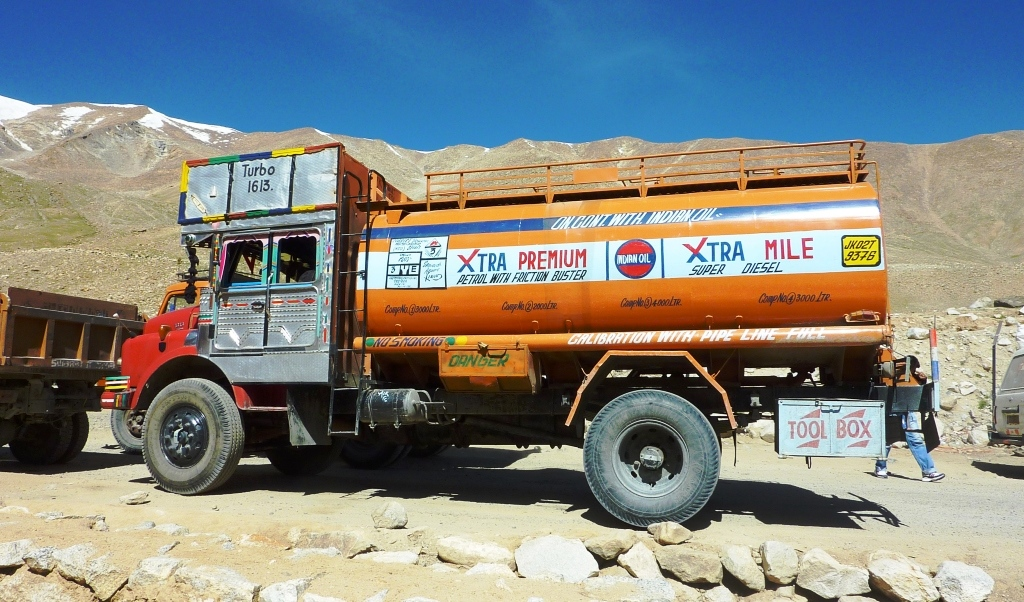
An Indian Oil fuel truck on the way to Ladakh

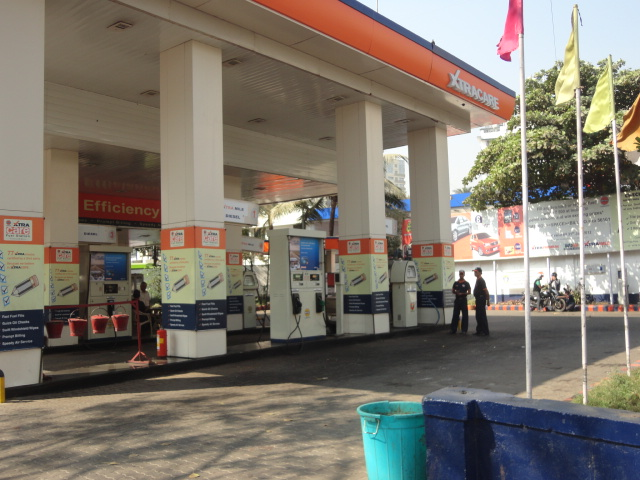
A typical IOCL petrol pump in cities of India - Chembur, Mumbai

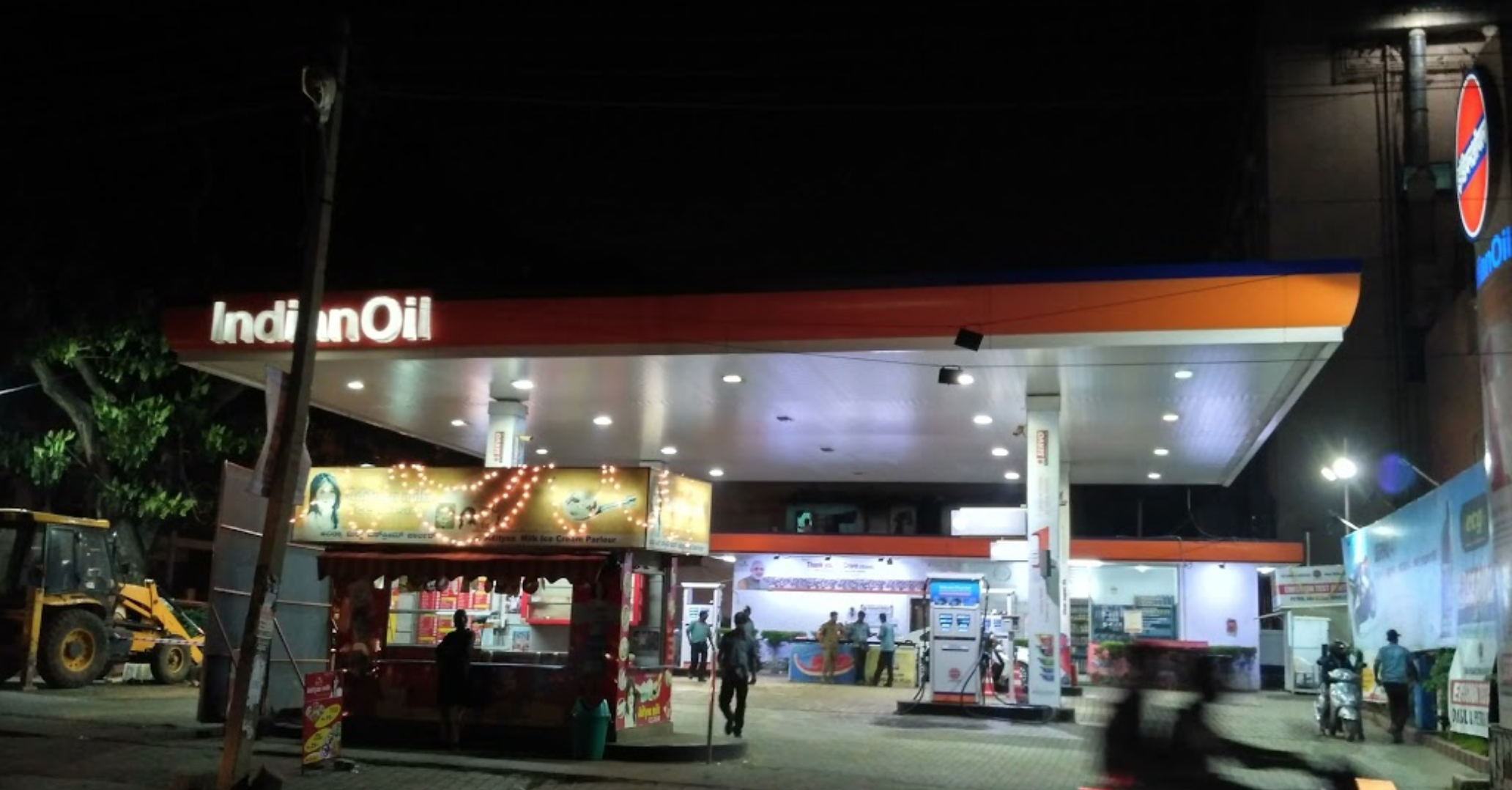
Indian Oil Petrol Bunk in Basaveshwaranagar, Bangalore at night

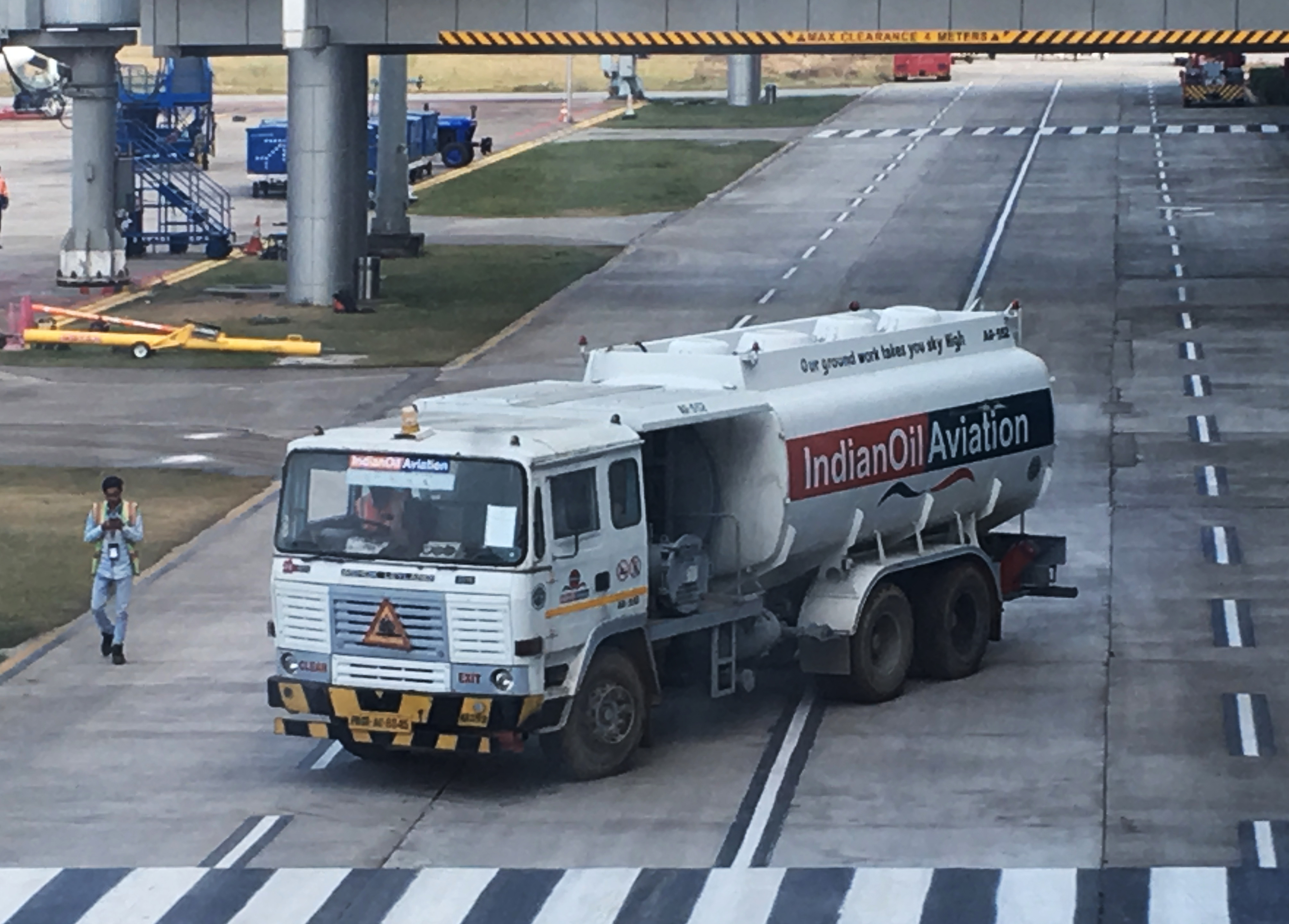
IndianOil aviation fuel tanker in front of Terminal 1D at Indira Gandhi International Airport

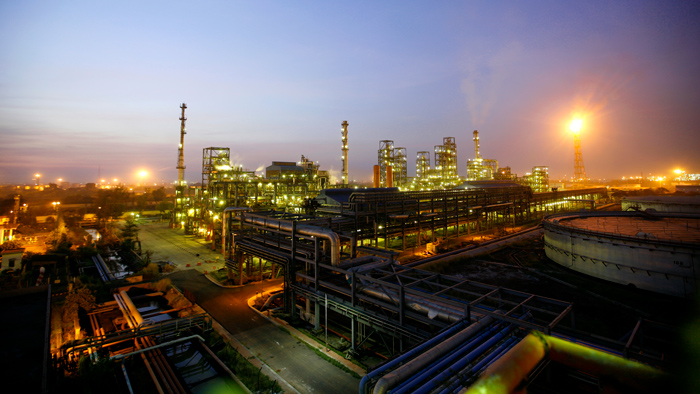
An oil refinery under IOCL in Haldia, West Bengal

=== Business divisions ===
There are seven major business divisions in the organisation:

1. Refineries Division
2. Pipelines Division
3. Marketing Division
4. R&D Division
5. Petrochemicals Division
6. Exploration & Production (E&P) Division
7. Explosives and Cryogenics Division

=== Products and services ===
Indian Oil accounts for nearly half of India's petroleum products market share, 35% national refining capacity (together with its subsidiary Chennai Petroleum Corporation Ltd. or CPCL), and 71% downstream sector pipelines through capacity. The Indian Oil Group owns and operates 11 of India's 23 refineries with a combined refining capacity of 80.7 million tonnes per year. Indian Oil's cross-country pipeline network, for the transport of crude oil to refineries and finished products to high-demand centres, spans over 13,000 km. The company has a throughput capacity of 80.49 million tonnes per year for crude oil and petroleum products and 9.5 million cubic metres per day at standard conditions for gas. On 19 November 2017, IOCL, in collaboration with Ola, launched India's first electric charging station at one of its petrol-diesel stations in Nagpur. Indian governments' National Electric Mobility Mission Plan launched in 2013 aims at gradually ensuring a vehicle population of 6 to 8 million electric and hybrid vehicles in India by 2020.

Servo is the lubricants brand under which IOCL operates its lubricant business. Servo is the largest selling lubricant brand in both automotive and industrial segments.

It is said that deals with Royal Dutch Shell and Surgutneftegas and Chevron Corporation have been signed for exclusive business plans for supply in Asia with the Indian Oil Company, which are worth 20 billion dollars per year.

=== Oil refinery locations ===
- Barauni Refinery
- Bongaigaon Refinery
- CPCL, Chennai
- CPCL, Narimanam
- Digboi Refinery
- Guwahati Refinery
- Haldia Refinery
- Koyali Refinery
- Mathura Refinery
- Panipat Refinery
- Paradip Refinery
- Gujarat Refinery

=== Pipelines ===
- Salaya - Mathura crude oil pipeline
- Mundra - Panipat crude oil pipeline
- Paradip-Haldia-Barauni crude oil pipeline
- Kandla–Bhatinda Oil Pipeline
- Koyali - Mohanpura product pipeline
- Koyali - Ahmedabad product pipeline
- Guwahati - Siliguri product pipeline
- Barauni - Kanpur product pipeline
- Patna-Motihari-Baitalpur Product pipeline
- Haldia - Mourigram - Rajbandh product pipeline
- Haldia - Barauni product pipeline
- Panipat - Jalandhar LPG pipeline
- Dadri - Panipat R-LNG pipeline
- Koyali - Ratlam product pipeline
- Koyali - Dahej/ Hazira product pipeline
- Panipat - Bhatinda product pipeline
- Panipat - Rewari product pipeline
- Panipat - Ambala - Jalandhar product pipeline
- Mathura - Delhi product pipeline
- Mathura - Bharatpur product pipeline
- Mathura - Tundla product pipeline
- Chennai - Trichy - Madurai product pipeline
- Chennai - Bangalore product pipeline
- Chennai ATF pipeline
- Bangalore ATF pipeline
- Kolkata ATF pipeline
- Paradip - Raipur - Ranchi product pipeline
- Jaipur Panipat Naphtha Pipeline
- Paradip - Hyderabad product pipeline
- Paradip-Haldia-Barauni-Motihari LPG Pipeline
- Paradip-Somnathpur-Haldia Product Pipeline

== Foreign subsidiaries ==
Subsidiaries include:

- IndianOil (Mauritius) Limited
- IOC Middle East FZE, UAE
- Lanka IOC PLC, Sri Lanka
- IOC Sweden AB, Sweden
- IOCL (USA) Inc., USA
- IndOil Global B.V. Netherlands
- IOCL Singapore Pte. Ltd.

== Employees ==
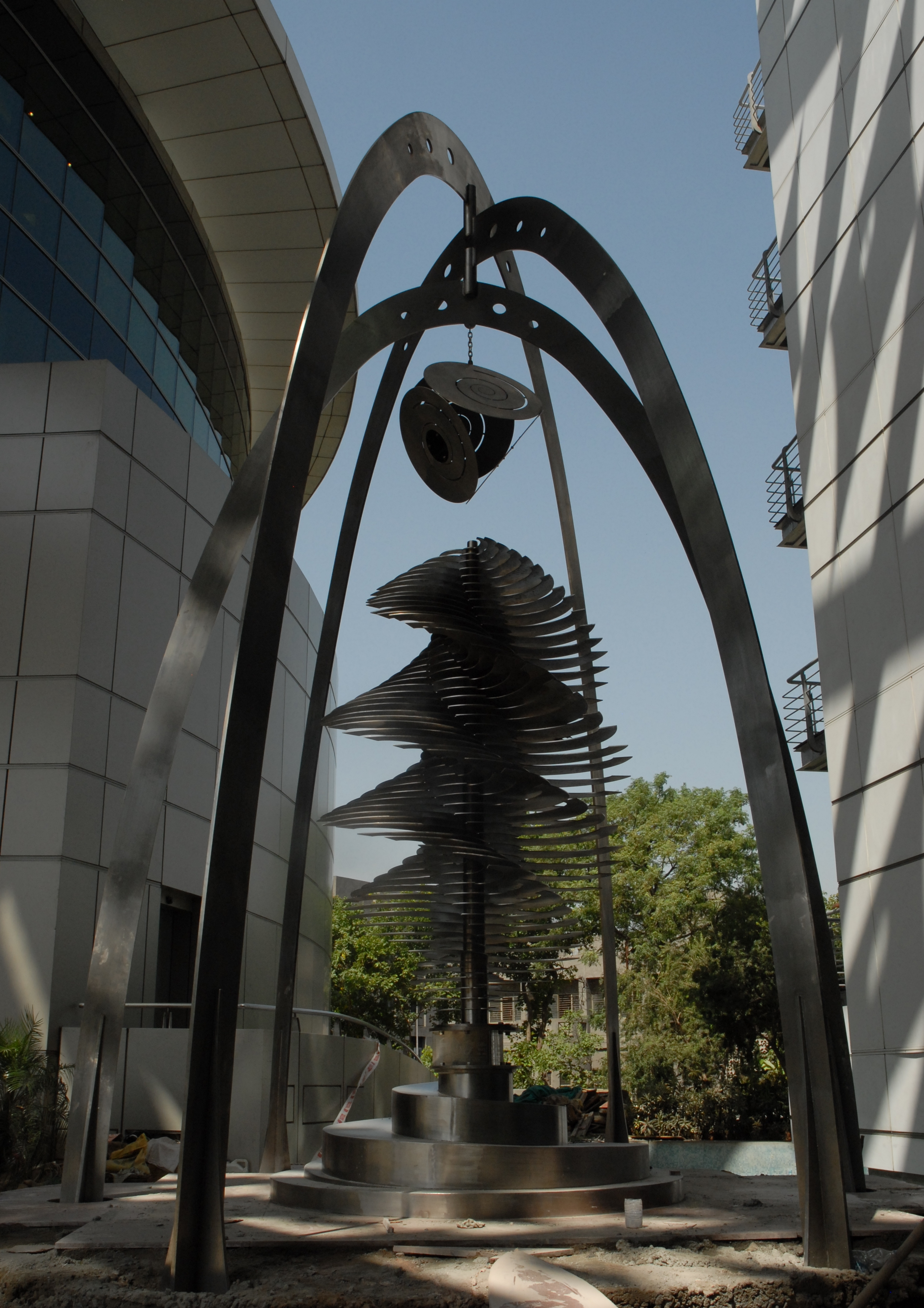
A sculpture on the premises of IOCL Corporate Office, New Delhi, India

As On 31 March 2024, IOC's Regular Employee Strength Stands At 30,321. Executives Account For 18,570, non-Executives Account For 11,751. The attrition rate in Indian Oil is around 1.5%. The company spent ₹96.57 billion on employee benefits during the FY 2016–17.

== Listing and shareholding ==
Indian Oil's equity shares are listed on the Bombay Stock Exchange and National Stock Exchange of India.

As of September 2018, it was owned 51% by the Government of India (through the President of India), and 43% by other entities. The latter included corporate bodies (20%), ONGC (14%), LIC (6%), Foreign portfolio investors (6%), Oil India Limited (5%) and Indian Mutual funds (4%).

This was similar to its shareholding in 2017. As of 31 December 2017, the Promoters Government of India held approx. 56.98% of the shares in Indian Oil Corporation. The public held the rest of the shares – 43.02%. This includes Mutual Fund Companies, Foreign Portfolio Investors, Financial Institutions/ Banks, Insurance Companies, Individual Shareholders and Trusts. IOCL's Market cap as of December 2022 was Rs. 1,10,075.05 crore.

Shareholders (as on 31 March 2020)	Shareholding
Promoter Group (President of India)	51.50%
Central Government	0.11%
Foreign Institutional Investors	5.81%
Mutual Funds	4.66%
General Public	6.01%
Financial Institutions	8.32%
Others	23.59%
Total	100.0%

== Strategic partnerships ==
=== IOC Phinergy Pvt Ltd ===
Indian Oil Corporation (IOC) buys a stake in Phinergy (Israel) for manufacturing, development, and sale of aluminum-air batteries (Al-Air batteries) for electric vehicles. This joint venture is ready to facilitate the development of Al-Air technology by intending to set up a factory in India.

== Competition ==
Indian Oil Corporation has two major domestic competitors – Bharat Petroleum and Hindustan Petroleum – and both are state-controlled, like Indian Oil Corporation. Major private competitors include – Reliance Petroleum, Nayara Energy and Shell.

== Oil Industry Development Board ==
India has begun the development of a strategic crude oil reserve sized at 37.4 million barrels (5,950,000 m^{3}), enough for three weeks of consumption. Petroleum stocks have been transferred from the Indian Oil Corporation to the Oil Industry Development Board (OIDB). The OIDB then created the Indian Strategic Petroleum Reserves Ltd (ISPRL) to serve as the controlling government agency for the strategic reserve.

== See also ==
- Oil India
- Oil and gas industry in India
- List of companies of India
- List of largest companies by revenue
- List of corporations by market capitalisation
- Make in India
- Forbes Global 2000
- Fortune India 500
- Rajiv Gandhi Institute of Petroleum Technology
- Indane (LPG)
- Durand Cup
