= Indane (LPG) =

Household name in India

- Product type: LPG
- Current owner: Indian Oil Corporation, Ministry of Petroleum and Natural Gas, Government of India
- Country: India
- Introduced: 1965
- Markets: India
- Tagline: Safe. Reliable. Convenient.
- Website: Indane website

Indane is a subsidiary of Indian Oil Corporation which is under the ownership of Ministry of Petroleum and Natural Gas of the government of India. It is the world's second largest government-owned subsidiary responsible for manufacturing LPG. The brand was conceived in 1964 to bring modern cooking to Indian kitchens. The first Indane LPG connection was released on 22 October 1965 at Kolkata. Indane serves more than 130 million families through a network of 12,500 distributors. 27% of its customers reside in semi-urban or rural markets and every second LPG cooking gas connection in India is that of Indane. The sales network is backed by 47 Indane area offices. The brand has been awarded the title of "Superbrand" by Superbrand India.

== History ==
The marketing operations for LPG commenced in India in 1955 at Mumbai, under the Burmah Shell Oil Company. It was not until Indian Oil took charge that it actually became a flourishing and recognizable industry. Brand Indane was conceived in 1964 and had very modest beginnings. The first Indane LPG connection was released on 22 October 1965 at Kolkata. Indane began operations in October 1965, with two dealerships in Kolkata and Patna, and a consumer base of around 2,000. At that time the concept of a cooking gas was new to the customers and they were apprehensive of keeping a gas cylinder in their kitchens, perceiving it as unsafe and a potential hazard.

More than 50 years later, Indane now has a customer base of more than 130 million and its distribution network delivers more than 2 million LPG cylinders in a day.

== Plants and Distribution Network ==
Bulk LPG is packed in LPG cylinders in bottling plants. IOCL currently has 91 bottling plants in the country to do such bottling. In a bottling plant, bulk LPG is received from the sources through pipelines, by road or by rail. This is then stored in the vessels and then filled in cylinders using sophisticated filling machines called Carousals. The world's highest LPG bottling plant – situated 3500 metres above sea level – is the Indane plant at Leh.

Indane has a network of more than 12,500 distributors across India with presence in more than 6,250 towns. The sales network is backed by 45 Indane area offices.

== See More ==
- Pradhan Mantri Ujjwala Yojana
