= Paradip Port =

Paradip Port Authority (PPA)
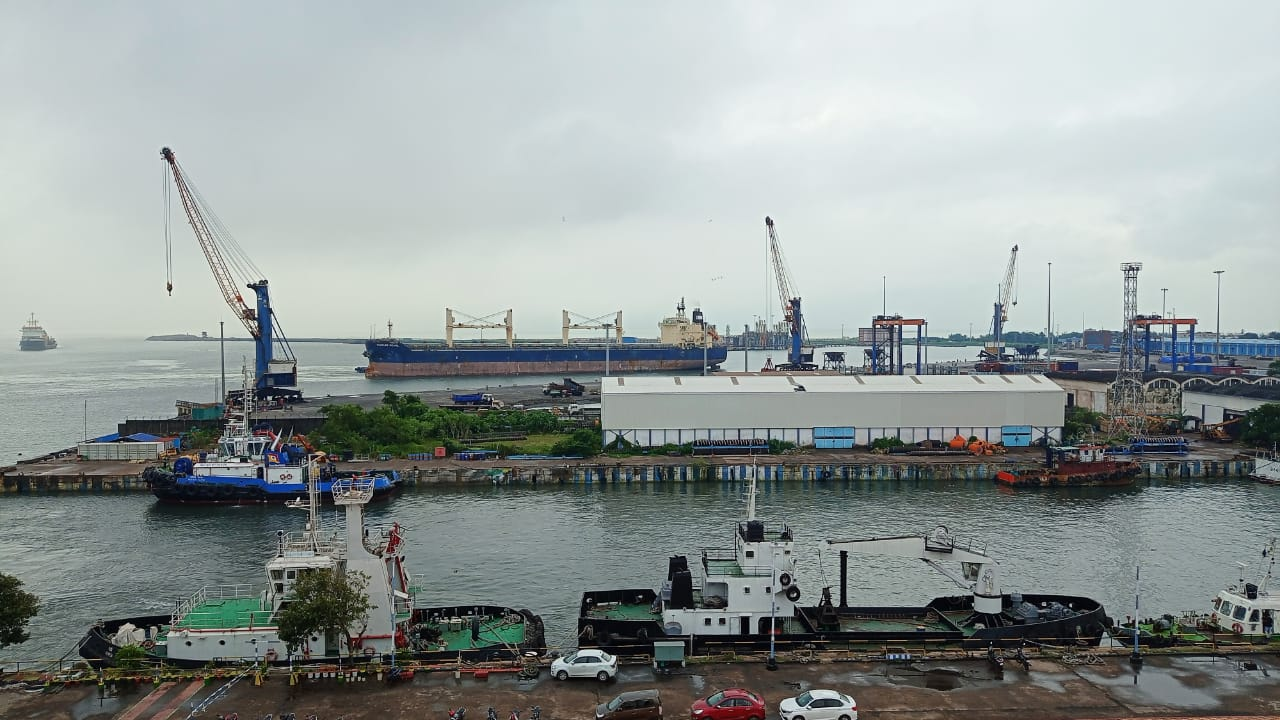
- Paradip Mega Port
- Interactive map of Paradip Port Authority (PPA)

Location
- Country: India
- Location: Paradip, Jagatsinghpur district, Odisha, India
- Coordinates: 20°15′55.44″N 86°40′34.62″E

Details
- Opened: 12 March 1966
- Operated by: Paradip Port Authority (PPA)
- Owned by: Government of India
- Type of Harbor: Artificial harbour
- No. of berths: 21
- Draft depth: 16 metres (52 ft)
- Length of approach channel: 2.2 kilometres (1.4 mi)
- Employees: 750
- Chairman: P.L. Haranadh, IRTS

Statistics
- Annual cargo tonnage: 150.41 million metric tons (165.80×10^{6} short tons) (2024–25)
- Website paradipport.gov.in

Paradip Port is a natural, deep-water port on the East coast of India in Paradip, just 53 km (33 mi) from Jagatsinghpur city in Jagatsinghpur district of Odisha, India. It is at the confluence of the Mahanadi river and the Bay of Bengal, 210 nmi (390 km; 240 mi) south of Kolkata and 260 nmi (480 km; 300 mi) north of Visakhapatnam.

The port have dry and breakbulk cargo handling terminal, oil jetty, and Single point mooring terminals. It primarily handles Panamax-sized–carriers of 60,000–80,000 deadweight tonnage (DWT)–vessels; however, the port has the ability to handle vessels of over 100,000 deadweight tonnage. It has a maximum draft depth of 16 metres (52 ft), and enabled to handle Capesize vessels up to 300 metres (980 ft) long (Beam 48 metres (157 ft) and 1,18,000 DWT) with a maximum draft of 14.5 metres (48 ft). This Port has single point moorings, which are located in deep water about 20 kilometres (12 mi) from the coast.

The Paradip Port support the hinterland of Central and East India. It mainly transports bulk cargoes and crude oil; handled 150.41 million metric tonnes of cargoes in the 2024–25 financial year. The port is administered by the Paradip Port Authority (PPA), formerly the Paradip Port Trust, an autonomous corporation wholly owned by the Government of India.

== History ==
Paradip is one of the major ports of India and the only major port in Odisha. Biju Patnaik, the then Chief Minister of Odisha, is the founding father of Paradip Port. It is situated 210 nautical miles south of Kolkata and 260 nautical miles north of Vishakhapatnam on the east coast on the shore of Bay of Bengal.

Jawaharlal Nehru, the then Prime Minister of India, laid the foundation stone of the port on 3 January 1962 near the confluence of the river Mahanadi and the Bay of Bengal.

Government of India took over the management of the port from the Government of Odisha on 1 June 1965. Maiden berthing was by INS Investigator on 12 March 1966. The port was declared open by Peter Stambolic, the Prime Minister of Yugoslavia on the same day. Government of India declared Paradip Port as the eighth major port of India on 18 April 1966 making it the first major port in the East Coast commissioned after independence.

The Port of Paradip, an autonomous body under the Major Port Trusts Act, 1963 functioning under Ministry of Shipping is administered by a board of trustees set up by the Government of India headed by the chairman. The Trustees of the Trust Board are nominated by Government of India from various users of the port such as shippers, ship owners, Government Departments concerned and also port labour. The day-to-day administration is carried out under general supervision and control of the chairman, assisted by the Deputy Chairman and other departmental heads.

== Port layout and infrastructure ==
=== Harbour ===
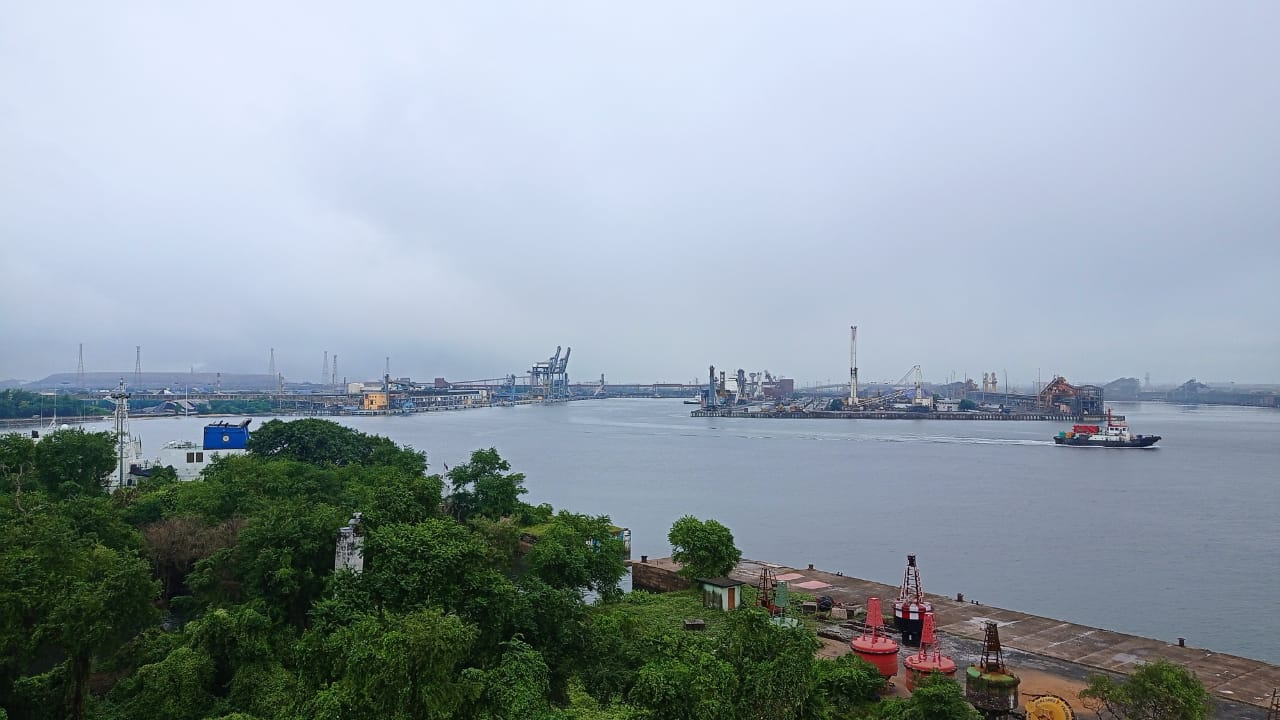
View of the lagoon-type harbour (or dock) of Paradip Port.

The Paradip Port has an artificial lagoon-type harbour protected by two rubble mound breakwaters—north breakwater and south breakwater. The north breakwater is 538 metres (1,765 ft) long on the north-eastern side of the port and the south breakwater is 1,217 metres (3,993 ft) long on the south-eastern side. The artificial harbour is constructed by dredging the land along the seashore. The prescribed water depth for the harbour basin and the turning basin within the harbour is 17.1 metres (56 ft), and the approach channel is 18.7 metres (61 ft) metres deep; which allows for the movement of large vessels with a maximum draft of 16 metres (52 ft) at high tide.

=== Approach channel ===
Depth of water in the channel
Depth		Measure (meters)	
Condition	Value	Approach	Entrance
Natural depth	Range	5–18.7 metres (16–61 ft)	
Natural depth	Dredged	18.7 metres (61 ft)	17.1 metres (56 ft)
Tidal depth	CD + MHWS	21.28 metres (69.8 ft)	19.68 metres (64.6 ft)
Tidal depth	CD + MHWN	20.72 metres (68.0 ft)	19.12 metres (62.7 ft)
Tidal depth	CD + LLWL	19.10 metres (62.7 ft)	17.5 metres (57 ft)

An 2.2 kilometres (1.4 mi) long approach channel at open sea used for the movement of ships to the port's harbour. The approach channel has a depth of 18.7 metres (61 ft) below chart datum (CD) and a minimum width of 190 metres (620 ft), allowing vessels with a draft of 15 metres (49 ft) to enter and leave the port without tidal assistance. However, the Mean High Water Springs (MHWS), Mean High Water Neaps (MHWN) and Lowest Low Water Level (LLWL) observed in the port area are 2.58 metres (8.5 ft), 2.02 metres (6.6 ft) and 0.40 metres (1.3 ft) respectively, which increases the water depth of the approach channel. With tidal assistance, the channel is capable of handling large ships with a draft of up to 16 metres (52 ft).

=== Single Point Mooring Terminals ===
The port has three Single Point Moorings (SPM). These Single Point Moorings are known as SPM Terminal-1, SPM Terminal-2, and SPM Terminal-3. The SMP terminals have berthing facilities for tankers up to 370 m long, while SMP terminals have the capacity to berth tankers of different drafts and wide beams, namely, in the case of SMP Terminal-1, the capacity is 60 metres (200 ft) wide beam with 21 metres (69 ft) draft, in the case of SMP Terminal-2, 60 metres (200 ft) wide beam with 23 metres (75 ft) draft, and in the case of SMP Terminal-3, 65 metres (213 ft) wide beam with 23 metres (75 ft) draft. As per the construction design and infrastructure, SMP terminals are capable of handling tankers up to a maximum of 3,20,000 DWT and a maximum of 80,000 DWT. The SPMs are located towards the southern side of the existing port in about 30 meters water depth, about 20 kilometers from shore, and are connected to the shore via submarine pipelines. They handle captive crude oil for Indian Oil Corporation (IOCL), and have a combined annual handling capacity of 37 MTPA.

== Gallery ==
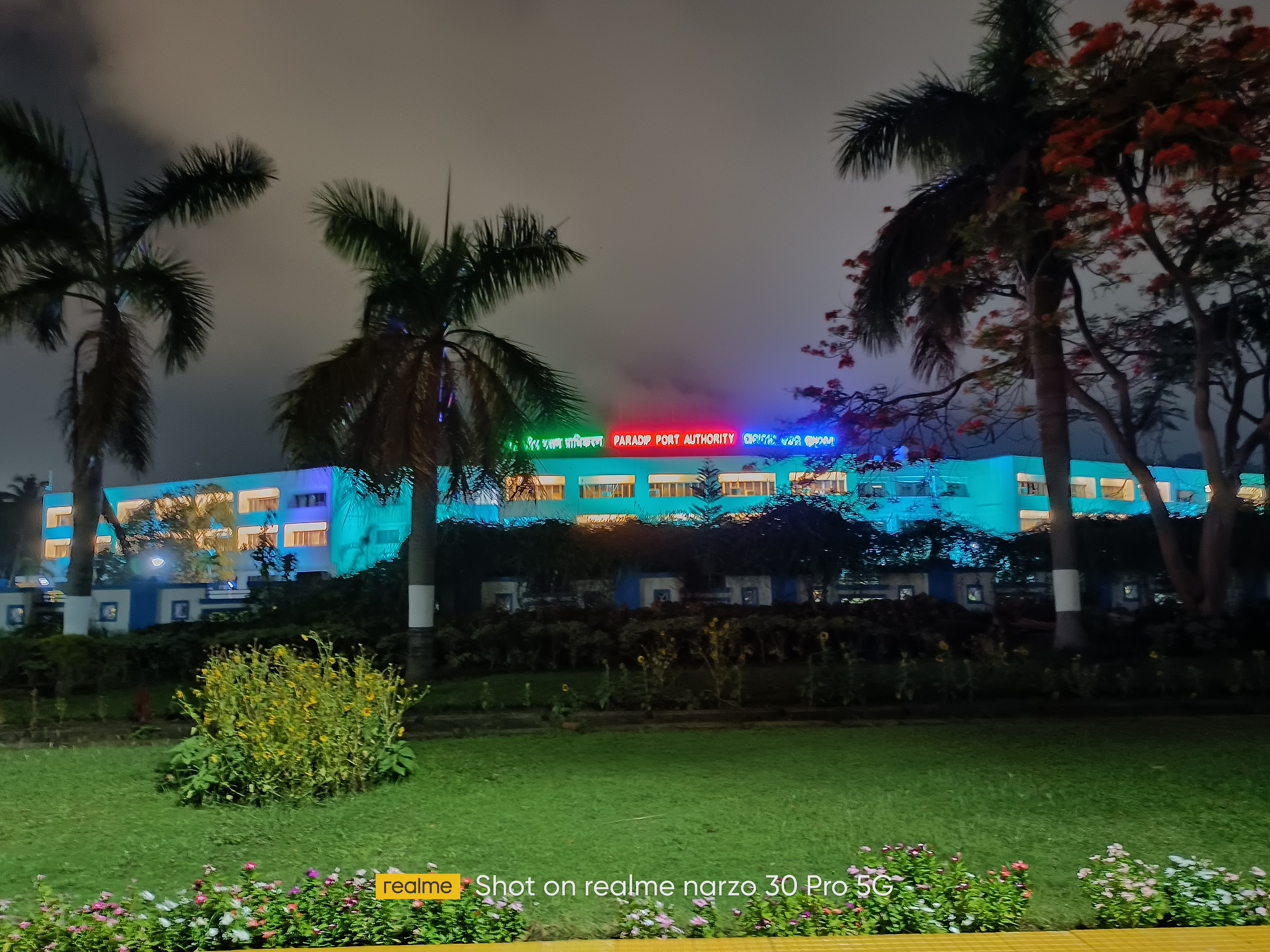
Paradip Port Authority Administrative Building, Odisha, India

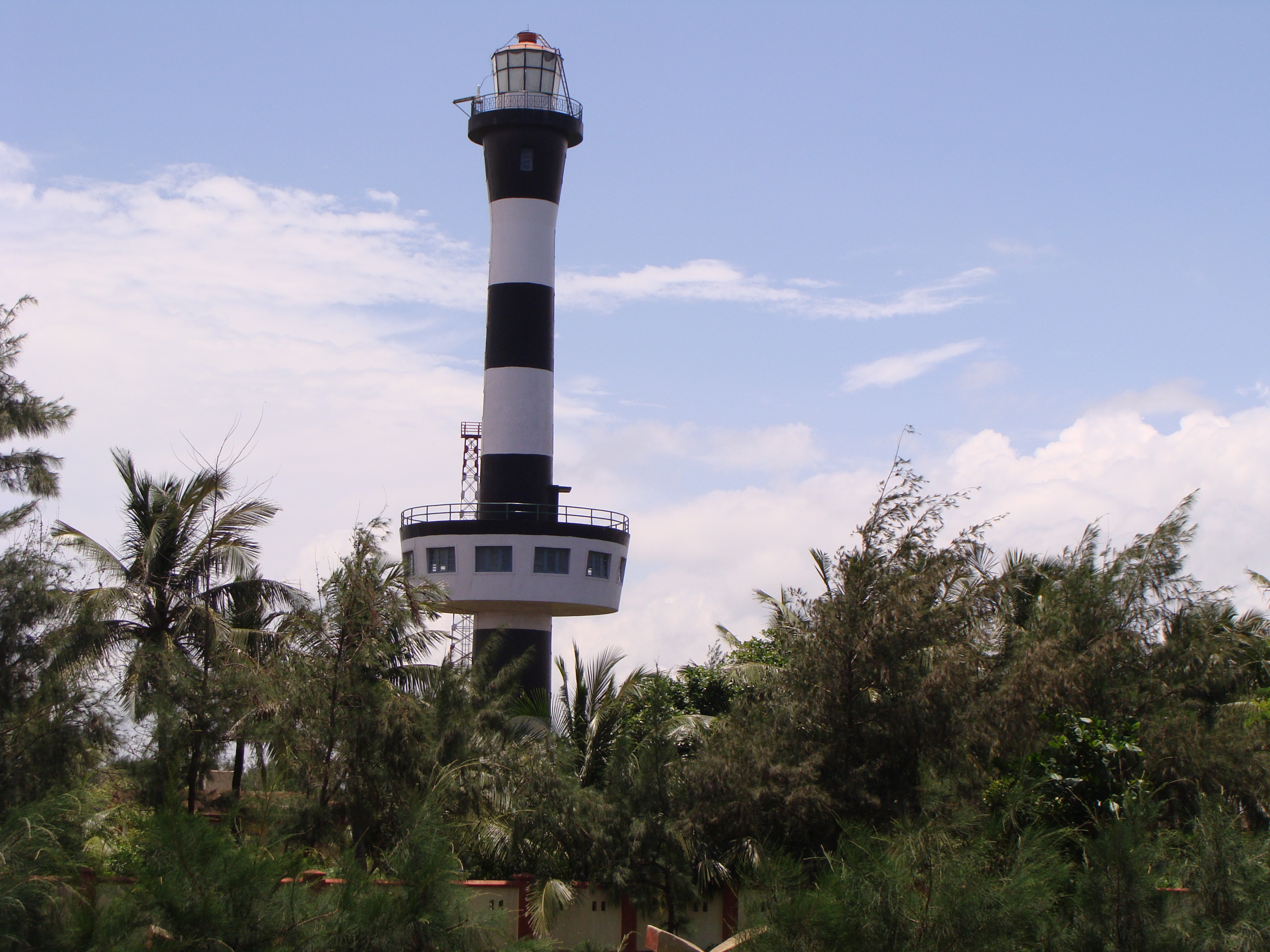
Paradip Lighthouse
