= Khurda Industrial Estate =

Coordinates: 20°10′20″N 85°38′44″E

Khordha Industrial Estate is an industrial area located in Khordha, in the Indian state of Odisha. Spread across 35 hectares, it has been developed to support small and medium-scale industries and forms part of the broader industrial infrastructure network promoted by the Odisha Industrial Infrastructure Development Corporation. The estate accommodates a range of manufacturing and ancillary units, contributing to local economic activity and employment generation in the region. Its development reflects state-level efforts to decentralise industrial growth beyond major hubs and to facilitate industrialisation in semi-urban areas. The estate benefits from its proximity to Bhubaneswar and connectivity through regional road and rail networks, which supports logistics and access to markets. Over time, it has served as a base for diverse industrial activities, although detailed data on the number of units and scale of operations is limited in publicly available sources.
