= Ramdaspur Industrial Estate =

Ramdaspur Industrial Estate is an industrial area located in the state of Odisha, India. Developed to promote small and medium-scale industries, the estate provides basic infrastructure and facilities for manufacturing and service units, contributing to regional economic development and employment generation. It is administered by state agencies responsible for industrial infrastructure, and forms part of the broader network of industrial estates established across Odisha to support decentralised industrial growth.
