= Odisha Industrial Infrastructure Development Corporation =

- Company type: Government
- Industry: Industries and Infrastructure
- Founded: 1981
- Headquarters: IDCO Towers, Bhubaneswar, Odisha, India
- Area served: Odisha
- Key people: Shri Sanjay Kumar Singh; IAS, CMD
- Website: www.idco.in

The Odisha Industrial Infrastructure Development Corporation or IDCO was established in the year 1981 under the Orissa Industrial Infrastructure Development Corporation Act, 1980 for developing infrastructure facilities in the identified Industrial Estate/Areas for rapid and orderly establishment and growth of industries, trade and commerce. The Odisha Industrial Infrastructure Development Corporation (IDCO) is the nodal agency for providing industrial infrastructure in the State of Odisha.

This IS0 9001 & IS0 14001 certified Corporation has achieved the unique distinction of being the only State level organization to be confined the 'Golden Peacock' award by the Institute of Directors, New Delhi for adopting and maintaining quality management standards in all its operations.

== Objectives ==
- Industrial Promotion
- Infrastructure Development
- Land Acquisition
- Project Construction

== Accolades ==
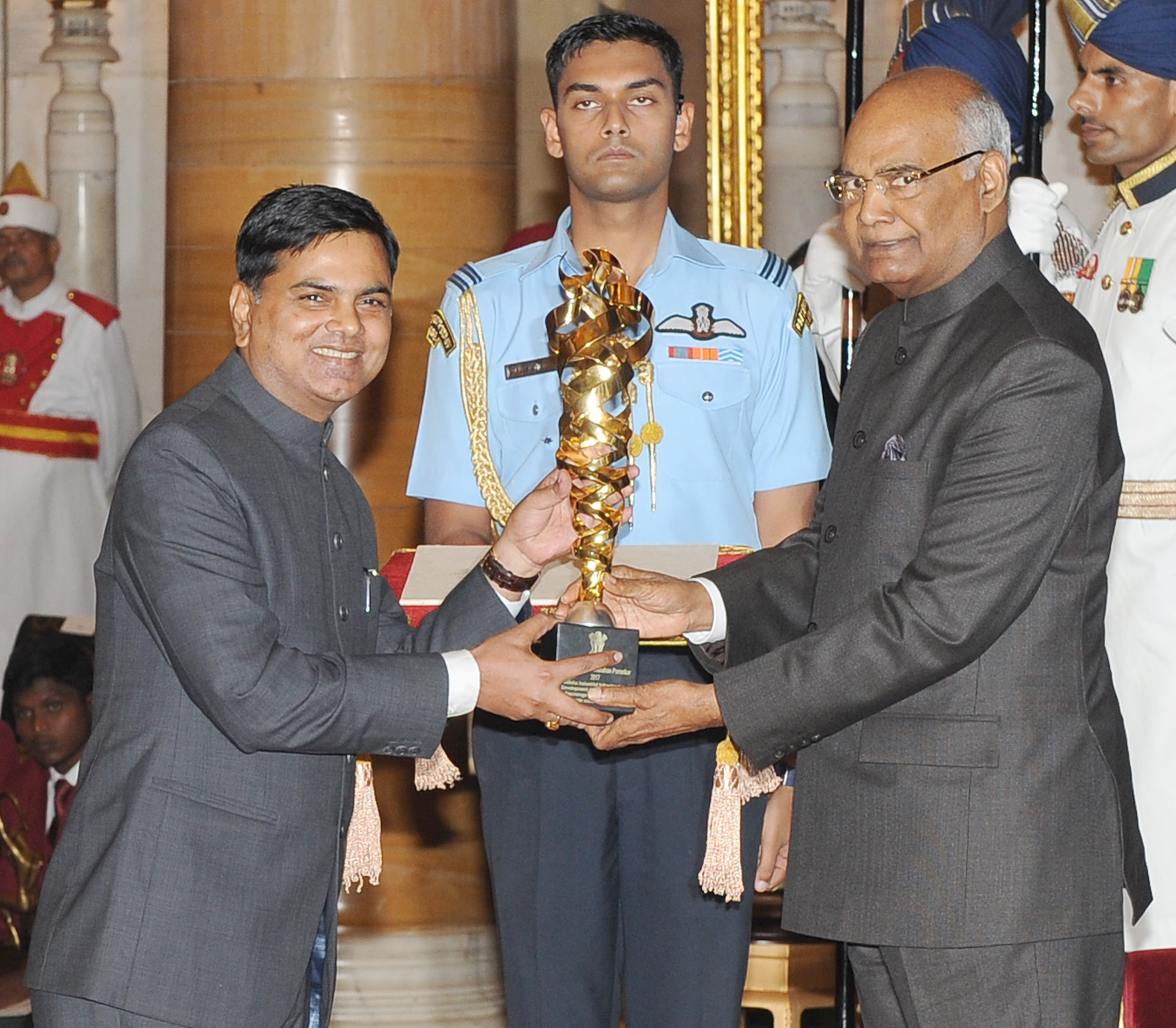
Ram Nath Kovind presenting the Rashtriya Khel Protsahan Puruskar, 2017 to the Encourage to sports through corporate social responsibility - Odisha Industrial Infrastructure Development Corporation (IDCO)

- Golden Peacock Innovative Product/Service Award 2018 for Automated Post Allotment Application (APAA)
- Highest Cess Deposit Award
- Rashtriya Khel Protsahan Purskar Awards 2017 for Development in Sports
- Vishwakarma Award 2018 for Best Archived Project of Dr. APJ Abdul Kalam Planetarium and Science and Evolution Park, Sambalpur
- Vishwakarma Award 2018 for Best Archived Project of Odisha Crafts Museum, Bhubaneswar
- Vishwakarma Award 2018 for Best Archived Project of Krushi Bhawan, Bhubaneswar
- Vishwakarma Award 2018 for Best Maintained Structure of Fortune Towers, Bhubaneswar
