= Oman LNG =

Liquefied natural gas plant in Qalhat, Oman

Coordinates: 22°39′40″N 59°24′19″E

Oman LNG الشركة العمانية للغاز الطبيعي المسال
- Company type: LLC
- Industry: Energy
- Founded: 1994; 32 years ago
- Headquarters: Muscat, Oman
- Key people: Talal Hamid Al Awfi (Chairman); Hamed Al Naamany (CEO)
- Products: Liquefied natural gas
- Owner: Oman Oil Company (51%); Royal Dutch Shell (30%); Total S.A. (5.54%); Korea Gas Corporation (5%); Mitsubishi Corporation (2.77%); Mitsui & Co. (2.77%); Partex (Oman) Corp (2%); Itochu Corporation (0.92%)
- Website: omanlng.co.om

Oman LNG is a LNG plant in Qalhat near Sur, Oman. The company was established by the Royal decree of Sultan Qaboos of Oman in 1994. The construction was launched in November 1996, and the plant was commissioned in September 2000. Oman LNG operates three LNG trains with a total capacity of 10.4 million tonnes per year. The company's production facilities are located on the coast at Qalhat near Sur in the South Sharqiyah Governorate, Oman.

== History ==
From 1989 to 1991, large non-associated natural gas fields were discovered in central Oman. In January 1992 the government of Oman accepted a preliminary feasibility study by Royal Dutch Shell and signed a memorandum of understanding for the establishment of a first LNG project.

In June 1993 a shareholders' agreement between the Government of Oman (51%), Royal Dutch Shell (30%), Total S.A. (5.54%), Korea Gas Corporation (5%), Partex (2%), Mitsubishi (2.77%), Mitsui (2.77%) and Itochu (0.92%) was signed. In February 1994 the company was established by Royal Decree of Sultan Qaboos bin Said and Oman LNG LLC registered as Omani company in July of the same year.

Oman LNG was structured and set up to manage and operate the "Downstream" of Oman's gas operations, involving mainly the liquefaction, transportation and respective sales of the produced liquefied natural gas (LNG). Whilst the "Upstream" is fully government owned and operated by Petroleum Development Oman. The upstream processes involve the field appraisal and development, gas processing and transport by pipeline to the liquefaction plant.

As location for the LNG plant Qalhat, near Sur, was chosen in 1995, being bolstered by the signing of the first Sales and Purchase Agreement (SPA) with Korea Gas Corporation in October 1996. The agreement detailed an amount of 4.1 million tonnes per year over the period of 25 years with shipments beginning in early 2000.

In November 1996 constructions of the LNG plant began. In the same month an Engineering, Procurement and Construction (EPC) contract between Oman LNG and Chiyoda/Foster Wheeler and a gas supply agreement with the government of Oman were signed. In 1997, the first Annual Oman LNG Day was celebrated.

Other long-term agreements were completed with Japan's Osaka Gas in October 1998, agreeing over the delivery of 0.7 million tonnes per year for 25 years, and with India's Dabhol Power Company in December 1999, over 1.6 million tonnes per year for 20 years – effectively selling the entire plant's output on a long-term basis. The first shipment was sent to South Korea in April 2001. Additional short-term SPA's were signed with Total, Coral Energy and Enagás.

In December 1999 the LNG plant's first production train was ready for start-up and the plant began production in February 2000. The first LNG was exported two month later (April) and the plant was officially inaugurated in October 2000.

In January 2002 the company was granted a US$1.3 billion loan from a consortium of banks in order to refinance the original debt.

Following the first two LNG trains of the plant a third train, named Qalhat LNG, with a production capacity of 3.7 million tonnes per year began construction in 2004. The project's commercial inauguration followed in the same year, when Mohammed Al Rumhi, Oman's oil and gas minister and chairman of Qalhat LNG, signed a long-term LNG supply agreement with the Japan's Mitsubishi Corporation. The plant was finished in late 2005, inaugurated in March 2006 and the first shipments commenced in early 2006. Also in 2005 the 500th cargo was shipped to KOGAS in Korea and the 1000th cargo to Osaka in Japan in 2009.

In 2008, Oman LNG received the Arabia Corporate Social Responsibility Award and the GCC Award for compliance with environmental regulations, which the company won again in 2010. Oman LNG also signed a 16-year contractual service agreement (CSA), in 2008, with GE Oil and Gas for the 12 GE gas turbines which are operated at the Qalhat complex. The deal was valued at $200 million.

In 2008 and 2009, the train utilization averaged at around 80% for the first time since the plant had struggled to find enough supply due to increased domestic demand caused by the industrial expansions and strong population growth. This shortage continued, and LNG exports also averaged around 8 million tonnes a year from 2010–2012, leaving around 20–25% of the plants capacity idle. These circumstances were expected to change with either a successful deal with Iran to import additional gas (in case the international sanctions against Iran were to be lifted) or with a possible decommissioning of one or more LNG trains at the plant.

In 2010, Oman LNG had to shut down all operations for a short period due to problems resulting from Cyclone Phet. The plant and workers remained unharmed.

In 2012, Oman LNG signed a five-year agreement with the Environment Society of Oman (ESO) to provide funding for ESO to increase the plants environmental conservation outreach and effectiveness.

On September 1, 2013, Oman LNG merged with Qalhat LNG to further increase operational effectiveness and lower costs. Oman's two major LNG companies continued operations as Oman LNG and remained headquartered in Muscat, Oman.

In August 2013, a Memorandum of Understanding (MoU) was signed between Iran and Oman, to export gas to Oman. Following a year-long process of negotiations and complex international involvement, Oman signed the final 25-year gas export deal with Iran only months later. The agreed 10 billion cubic meters of gas per year were scheduled to begin in 2017 and also entailed the construction of a 260 km (162 mile) cross-Gulf pipeline at the cost of around $1 billion. The deals total is valued at around $60 billion.

In 2015, again due to problematic increases in domestic demand and resulting in a gas shortage for the liquefaction plant, Oman LNG had to reschedule five to ten percent of all exports.

In 2017, with enhanced upstream capacity coming in from BP, Oman's large Khazzan gas project came online and Oman LNG began operating all three of its LNG trains at full capacity for the first time. The trains had been running at around 75–80% for a decade. The forecast for 2018 included a 23.5% increase on exports compared to those in 2016.

That same year, Petroleum Development Oman (PDO) and Oman LNG signed a three-year partnership agreement to enhance technical and commercial cooperation to which modifications at the plants were scheduled and agreements with international firms were reached.

In 2018, Oman LNG signed a SPA with BP Singapore, detailing a seven-year delivery of 1.1. million tonnes per year, beginning in January 2018.

The company's current CEO is Harib Al Kitani and the main shareholder is the Oman Oil Company (51%) in cooperation with Royal Dutch Shell (30%), Total S.A. (5.54%), Korea LNG (5%), Partex Oil & Gas (2%), Mitsubishi Corporation (2.77%), Mitsui & Co. (2.77%), and Itochu Corporation (0.92%).

As of 2020, the shares were divided up between the Government of the Sultanate of Oman (51%), Shell Gas B.V (30%), Total S.A (5.54%), Korea LNG (5%), Mitsubishi Corporation (2.77%), Mitsui & Co. Ltd. (2.77%), Partex (Oman) Corporation (2%), and Itochu Corporation (0.92%).

The LNG plant is supplied from the gas gathering plant at Saih Rowl in the central Oman gas field complex through 360 kilometres (224 mi) long 48 inches (1,200 mm) pipeline with a capacity of 12 billion cubic meters per annum of gas, operated by Petroleum Development Oman. The gas origins from Barik, Saih Nihayda and Saih Rawl gas fields.

The LNG plant consists two 3.3 million tons per annum liquefaction trains, which were constructed by Chiyoda-Foster Wheeler. In addition, the plant employs Air Products' AP-C3MR technology and has two storage facilities capable of holding 240,000 cubic metres (8,500,000 cu ft) of LNG. The total construction costs were US$2 billion.

In October 2013, it was announced that Oman LNG and Qalhat LNG would merge to become a single entity. This would increase the nameplate capacity of the combined entity to 10.3 million tons per annum.

In 2017, OLNG was awarded the Sultan Qaboos Award for Voluntary work for the second time. In 2019, OLNG celebrated 35 million working hours without a Lost Time Injury (LTI). OLNG hosted the IGRC 2020, which was a first ever in the region.
