= 2017 Sri Lankan fuel crisis =

Week long petrol shortage faced by Sri Lanka

Sri Lanka, from 3 November 2017 until 11 November 2017, faced a fuel shortage when a substandard fuel shipment was rejected which caused a depletion in reserves due to the general public fearing of a prolonged duration of crisis. However, there was only a shortage of petrol, not diesel fuel or kerosene.

== Events ==
The Sri Lanka fuel crisis began on 3 November 2017 when rumours started spreading that a fuel shipment belonging to Lanka IOC (Indian Oil Company) was rejected. Later on the rumour was confirmed as legitimate and the reason given was that the fuel in the rejected shipment was not up to standards. Arjuna Ranatunga the Minister of Petroleum Resources Development on the next day addressed the situation to the media. However the Ministry of Petroleum Resources Development announced that there was 10,000 metric tonnes fuel in the reserves to last till 9 November 2017 but the leader of the Ceylon Petroleum Union, Asanka Ranawala said the contrary to this. Due to development of the tense situation the general public started panic buying causing the reserves to deplete faster than expected. However the crisis was brought to a stop after the ship Nevaska Lady on 11 November 2017 with 40,000 metric tonnes of fuel which was reported as being sufficient for twenty days.

== Other causes ==
Other than the substandard fuel rejected being the main reason for the crisis there were several other events that worsened the crisis during this time period.

- Delay of other fuel ship - the rejected fuel shipment arrived in Sri Lanka on 15 October 2017 and on 17 October 2017 was rejected however this did not cause any panic as "Nevaska Lady" the fuel ship which was supposed to arrive on 4 November 2017 for the CPC but even this ship had to extend its arrival date to 11 November 2017. This is what led to the rumors regarding the fuel shortage originated from which made the public panic
- Sapugaskanda Oil Refinery Shutdown - another issue faced in this crisis was the power loss which caused the Sapugaskanda Oil Refinery to be shut down for almost three days. The Sapugaskanda Oil Refinery is the only Oil Refinery in the whole island which caused an outrage among general public after what happened.
- No replacement for rejected stock - The Lanka IOC informed that they were unable to replace the rejected stock and continued to harbor the rejected stock in the Trincomalee harbor. This was the initial problem which fused the shortage and caused the crisis.

== Implemented solutions ==
Many steps were taken by the Ministry of Petroleum Resources Development to overcome the problem until any fuel shipments arrived

- Purchasing from Spot Market - Fuel was purchased from the Spot Market to immediately recover from the shortage. An amount of 8,500 barrels were purchased from the spot market whereas the price have been concealed from the public.
- Releasing petrol station reserves - After the demand for petrol went high the Ministry of Petroleum ordered fuel stations to give put from their reserves without any hesitation.

== Aftermath ==
A cabinet sub committee was appointed by the President of Sri Lanka Maithripala Sirisena in order to investigate the crisis on the 7 November 2017. According to the report submitted by the committee on 17 November 2017 the main reason for the crisis was the failure to maintain proper fuel stocks according to the average use and another reason was the failure to report the dire situation to higher authorities on time causing the whole situation to go out of hand. However, according to the officials the report is inconclusive and the sub committee has also requested recruiting technical officers to get a more detailed report.

== See also ==
- Energy crisis
