= Sapugaskanda Refinery =

Oil refinery in Sapugaskanda, Sri Lanka

- Location within Sri Lanka
- Location: Sapugaskanda, Western Province, Sri Lanka; 06°57′57″N 79°57′30″E

Refinery details
- Owner: CEYPETCO
- Opened: October 12, 1969; 57 years ago
- Capacity: 50,000 barrels (7,900 m^{3}) per stream day
- No. of employees: 1,100
- No. of oil tanks: 65

The Sapugaskanda Refinery (also referred to as Sapugaskanda Oil Refinery) is the single largest oil refinery of Sri Lanka. The refinery was built in August 1969 by the Ceylon Petroleum Corporation under the guidance of Iran, initially designed to process 38,000 barrels (6,000 m^{3}) per stream day of Dubai crude oil, and Arabian light crude oil. (Medium sour crude oil) It was commissioned on 12 October 1969. The facility, which covers an area of 165 acres (67 ha), currently has a capacity of 50,000 barrels (7,900 m^{3}) per stream day.

As with most refineries, the Sapugaskanda Refinery has an in-house utilities section which supplies electricity, water, steam, instrument air, and other necessities for operations. In total, 65 storage tanks are located at the premises for storage of crude oil, finished, and other products, five of which has a capacity of 40,000 tonnes (39,000 long tons). A further four crude oil tanks located in the separate Orugodawatta tank farm.

== History ==
- The initial survey for the refinery was conducted in 1963.
- On 9 May 1967, the foundation stone was laid for the refinery. Construction was handled by Snamprogetti, while the facility supervision was handled by UOP LLC.
- On 12 October 1969, the refinery was commissioned.
- In 1971, the naphtha merox unit was modified to commence production of liquefied natural gas (LNG), while SBPS production was also commenced with existing infrastructure. The crude distiller was also modified to increase capacity from 38,000 to 50,000 barrels (6,000 to 7,900 m^{3}) per stream day during this period.
- In 1981, a kerosene merox was installed to process A-1 jet fuel, while the energy-intensive Kerosene unifiner was decommissioned.
- In 1992, the crude distiller unit was again modified to support far Eastern crude oils such as Miri light crude oil, and Naphtha unifiner capacity was increased to 1100 tonne per day.
- In 1999, platformer unit was modified to increase capacity to 650 tonne per day, to meet increasing gasoline demand, and to phase out lead in gasoline.
- In 2003, the kerosene unifiner was modified to process diesel, and the existing gas oil unifiner was rehabilitated to meet the sulphur specification of 0.3%wt in diesel.
- On 19 February 2018, the entire facility was shut down for 35 days due to a planned refurbishment project. 1,200 engineers and mechanics handled the 24×7 maintenance covering the processing units, utilities, and tank farm. The production shortage during the period was covered by importing the requirements by the Ceylon Petroleum Corporation.

== Power stations ==
Three oil-fired power stations are built at the vicinity of the refinery for ease of fuel logistics:

1. Sapugaskanda Power Station (160 MW) - Owned by the Ceylon Electricity Board
2. Lakdhanavi Power Station (24 MW) - Owned by Lakdhanavi (Private) Limited
3. Asia Power Sapugaskanda Power Station (51 MW) - Owned by Asia Power (Private) Limited

== See also ==
- Energy in Sri Lanka
- Hambantota Refinery
