= Hambantota Refinery =

Oil refinery project in Sri Lanka

- Location within Sri Lanka
- Location: Hambantota, Southern Province, Sri Lanka; 06°07′17″N 81°04′21″E

Refinery details
- Owners: Silver Park International (Pte) Ltd; Ministry of Oil and Gas of Oman
- Capacity: 200,000 barrels (32,000 m^{3}) per stream day
- No. of employees: 1,500 (est.)

The Hambantota Refinery (also called Greenfield Oil Refinery) is an oil refinery to be developed in Mirijjawila, Hambantota, in the Southern Province of Sri Lanka. The 585-acre (237 ha) refinery will be built and owned by Singapore's Silver Park International (Private) Limited (70%) and Oman's Ministry of Oil and Gas (30%). Silver Park International is an investment vehicle owned by India's Accord Group. It will have a refining capacity of 200,000 barrels (32,000 m^{3}) per stream day, ten times the capacity of the Sapugaskanda Refinery, the country's only other refinery which was built in 1969 by Iran.

At a cost of US$ 3.85 billion (Rs. 687 billion) (2019), the refinery development is the single largest foreign direct investment in Sri Lanka's history. Construction of the first phase will commence on 24 March 2019 at a groundbreaking ceremony in the Mirijjawila Export Processing Zone, with Prime Minister Ranil Wickremesinghe attending as chief guest, with the project slated for completion in 44 months.

Almost the entire output from the refinery will be exported, generating an estimated annual revenue of US$ 7 billion (Rs. 1.25 trillion) (2019). However, CEYPETCO and Lanka IOC could bid for refined petroleum products at competitive prices to supply to local consumers.

== Storage and export ==
Under construction first phase, US$ 1.8 billion (Rs. 321 billion) (2019) will be assigned to construct the oil terminal, pipeline, and other infrastructure. The oil terminal will be able to store 1,000,000 metric tons (980,000 long tons; 1,100,000 short tons) of crude oil, and around 700,000 metric tons (690,000 long tons; 770,000 short tons) of refined petroleum products.

Exports from the refinery will be channelled through the now Chinese-owned Hambantota Port, which has been mostly idle for nearly a decade since being built. The port, initially state-owned, has been leased to China in 2017 for 99 years, after Sri Lanka was unable to service a loan from Beijing.

== History ==
- Before 2017, a 100,000 barrels (16,000 m^{3}) per stream day refinery was agreed to be built at Trincomalee by Indian Oil Corporation, although no progress has been made since.
- In September 2017, Sri Lanka engaged in talks with two Chinese companies for a $3 billion refinery in Hambantota.
- During President Maithripala Sirisena's official visit to Tehran, cabinet spokesman Rajitha Senaratne stated that Iran has agreed to build a refinery and will send a team for assessments.
- 19 March 2019, Sri Lanka confirms US$ 3.85 billion refinery with Singapore's Silver Park International (Private) Limited and Oman's Ministry of Oil and Gas.
- 21 March 2019, Oman denies ever being aware of the US$ 3.85 billion refinery deal. Director General of Sri Lanka's state-run Board of Investment, Champika Malalgoda, then stated that the project would still go ahead, although without clarification on this situation or how the missing investment would be covered.

== See also ==
- Energy in Sri Lanka
