= Asia Power Sapugaskanda Power Station =

Power station in Gampaha District, Sri Lanka

- Country: Sri Lanka
- Location: Sapugaskanda
- Coordinates: 6°57′22″N 79°56′54″E
- Status: Operational
- Construction began: 1996
- Commission date: June 1998
- Operator: Asia Power

Thermal power station
- Primary fuel: Fuel oil
- PUCSL License: EL/GI/14-10

Power generation
- Units operational: 8 × 6.4 MW
- Make and model: Deutz AG 16VBVM640 (8)
- Nameplate capacity: 50 MW

The Asia Power Sapugaskanda Power Station (also sometimes referred to as Asia Power Station) is a 51 MW thermal power station in Sapugaskanda, Sri Lanka. Planning for the fuel oil-run power station dated back to 1994, when the Ceylon Electricity Board issued a tender for an IPP project for 50 megawatts. Construction of the plant began in 1996 and was commissioned in June 1998, with a PPA of 20-years. The power station utilizes eight Deutz 16V BVM 640 generating units.

== See also ==
- Sapugaskanda Power Station
- Lakdhanavi Power Station
- List of power stations in Sri Lanka
