= Nationalisation in Sri Lanka =

Government policy in Sri Lanka

From 1956 to 1977, the Government of Sri Lanka Nationalised key sectors of the economy, driven by socialist ideology. These include print media, transport, education, plantations, banking, and industry; shaping Sri Lanka’s post-colonial economic model and state structure.

== History ==
=== Mahajana Eksath Peramuna Government (1956–1959) ===
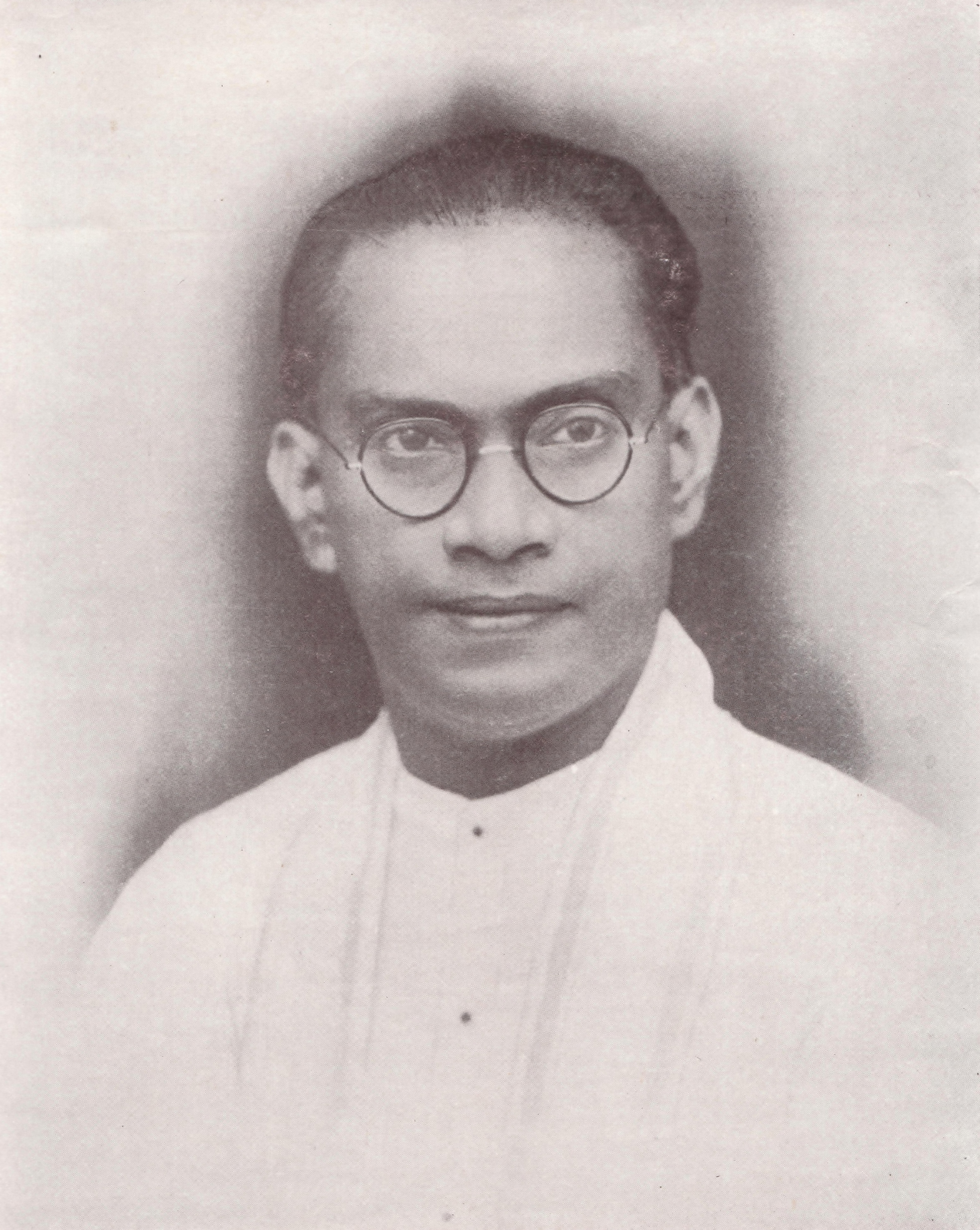
S.W.R.D.Bandaranayaka, Prime Minister of Ceylon (1956–1959).

Prime Minister S. W. R. D. Bandaranaike's Mahajana Eksath Peramuna initiated nationalisation, having voted in to power in 1956 on a platform of Sinhala nationalism and economic reform. Private Motor omnibus companies were nationalised in 1958 and the Ceylon Transport Board (CTB) was established to develop rural transport and eliminate private monopolies.

=== Sri Lanka Freedom Party Government (1960–1965) ===
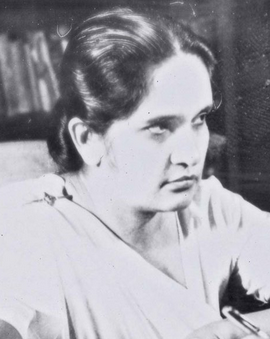
Sirimavo Bandaranaike, Prime Minister of Ceylon (1960–1965; 1970–1977; 1994–2000).

=== Takeover of schools ===
Private schools were nationalised under the Assisted Schools and Training Colleges (Special Provisions) Act No. 5 of 1960, passed by Sirimavo Bandaranaike’s Sri Lanka Freedom Party government, by taking over private schools receiving state funding. With the takeover, religious instruction was curtailed and the education standardized under the Department of Education.

==== Nationalisation of industry and banking ====
The largest bank in the island, the Bank of Ceylon was nationalized and the People’s Bank was established to function as the two state banks to assist in national development The petroleum sector was nationalised establishing the Ceylon Petroleum Corporation in 1961 and expropriated the properties belonging to Shell, Esso and Caltex. Colombo Harbour was nationalized in 1958, followed by the Galle Harbour in 1964 and the Trincomalee Harbour in 1967.

=== United Front Government (1970–1977) ===
==== Economic nationalisation ====
The Sirimavo Bandaranaike second term as head of the United Front government carried out extensive nationalisation with the supported by the Lanka Sama Samaja Party and the Communist Party of Sri Lanka, implemented a socialist-oriented agenda, with the aim of achieving economic self-sufficiency and reduce dependence on foreign investment and imports. However, many state-owned enterprises became inefficient, overstaffed, and politicised.

==== Land and plantation reform ====
The United Front government introduced the Land Reform Law of 1972 imposed a 50-acre ceiling on private land ownership. Over one million acres of land—including foreign-owned tea, rubber, and coconut plantations—were expropriated and redistributed through the Land Reform Commission.

==== Nationalisation of the press ====
In 1964, Bandaranaike's SLFP-led coalition attempted to nationalised the country’s largest newspaper group, Associated Newspapers of Ceylon Limited (ANCL), commonly known as the "Lake House", triggering strong opposition from both the United National Party and elements within the ruling coalition. On 3 December 1964, 13 members of the SLFP, led by C. P. de Silva, crossed over and voted with the opposition against the press takeover bill. As a result, the government was defeated in Parliament by one vote, forcing Bandaranaike to dissolve Parliament and call early elections. The incident marked the fall of the first Bandaranaike administration and was one of the earliest examples of press nationalisation becoming a flashpoint for political instability in post-independence Sri Lanka.

In her second term, Bandaranaike's United Front government passed the "Associated Newspapers of Ceylon Limited (Special Provisions) Law No. 28 of 1973" taking over Lake House on the claim that to prevent media monopolies and ensure that information served the national interest. It brought NCL newspapers—including the Daily News, Silumina, and Dinamina— under state control. Critics argued that the nationalisation led to the erosion of editorial independence and turned major publications into government propaganda tools. Journalistic dissent was curtailed, and media became a platform for advancing the United Front’s political messaging.

== See also ==
- Land Reform Commission (Sri Lanka)
- Ceylon Transport Board
- Land Reform Law, 1972
- C. W. W. Kannangara
- Sirimavo Bandaranaike
- J. R. Jayewardene
- Sri Lanka Freedom Party
- United National Party
