= Gampaha (disambiguation) =

Gampaha may refer to:

- Gampaha, a city in western Sri Lanka in Gampaha District, Western Province
- Gampaha, Uva, a town in south eastern Sri Lanka in Badulla District, Uva Province
- Gampaha District, an administrative district of Sri Lanka
- Gampaha Electoral District, a multi-member electoral district of Sri Lanka
