= Lanka Metro Transit =

Bus service provider in Sri Lanka

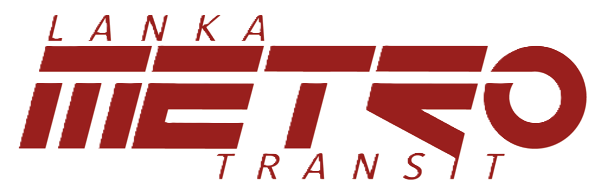

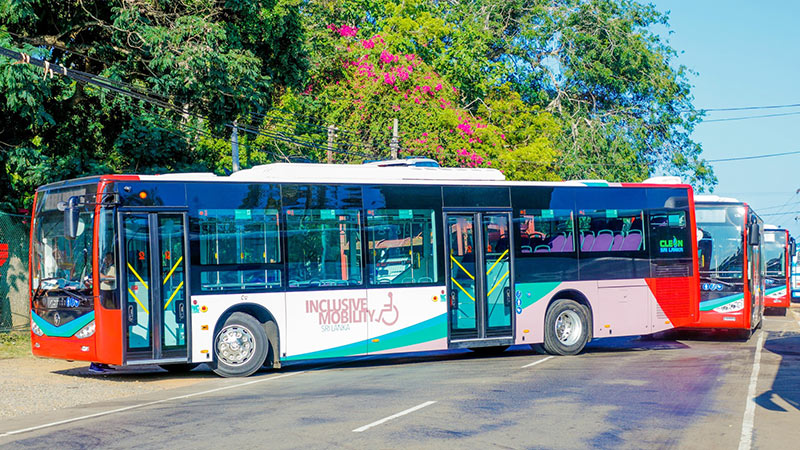
- A Foton C12 "Lanka Metro Transit" Bus in "Inclusive Mobility" livery.
- Parent: Ministry of Transport, Highways and Urban Development
- Founded: 8 October 2025
- Headquarters: Wing C, 7th Floor, Sethsiripaya Stage II, Battaramulla, Sri Lanka
- Locale: Greater Colombo Metropolitan Region
- Service area: Colombo, Sri Lanka
- Service type: Bus rapid transit / Urban Express
- Routes: 7
- Stops: 90 - 100
- Hubs: Makumbura MMC Kottawa, Pettah Central Bus Stand, Kadawatha KMC, Dematagoda Railway Station, Panadura Base Hospital, Kollupitiya Railway Station, Ekala LMT Depot
- Fleet: 122
- Fuel type: Auto Diesel
- Operator: Lanka Metro Transit (Pvt) Ltd
- Chief executive: B.M. Piyathilake
- Website: lankametro.lk

Lanka Metro Transit (Pvt) Ltd, abbreviated as LMT, is a state-affiliated transport company in Sri Lanka established to operate a modernised urban bus network. Launched under the Ministry of Transport, Highways and Urban Development, the service is designed to provide a high-quality "Metro Bus" alternative to private vehicle use, specifically targeting traffic congestion in the Colombo Metropolitan Region.

== History ==
The establishment of Lanka Metro Transit was approved by the Cabinet of Ministers in June 2025 as part of a national strategy to modernise public transport. The administrative operations for the company officially commenced in October 2025, headquartered at Sethsiripaya, Battaramulla.

In February 2026, President Anura Kumara Dissanayake announced that the service would begin passenger operations in August 2026. The project was introduced to address the "unplanned growth" of Sri Lankan cities by implementing a "bus cluster" system, where a formal company manages the deployment of high-standard vehicles.

On 21 April 2026, the pilot project operations of LMT began from Makumbura Multimodal Center, and were launched to Fort and Kadawatha.

== Operations ==
The transit system focuses on several key pillars including the digitalisation of public transportation, to create a safe and environmentally friendly public transport system, that is reliable and that can be used by all, and to foster economic development.

=== Infrastructure and Fleet ===
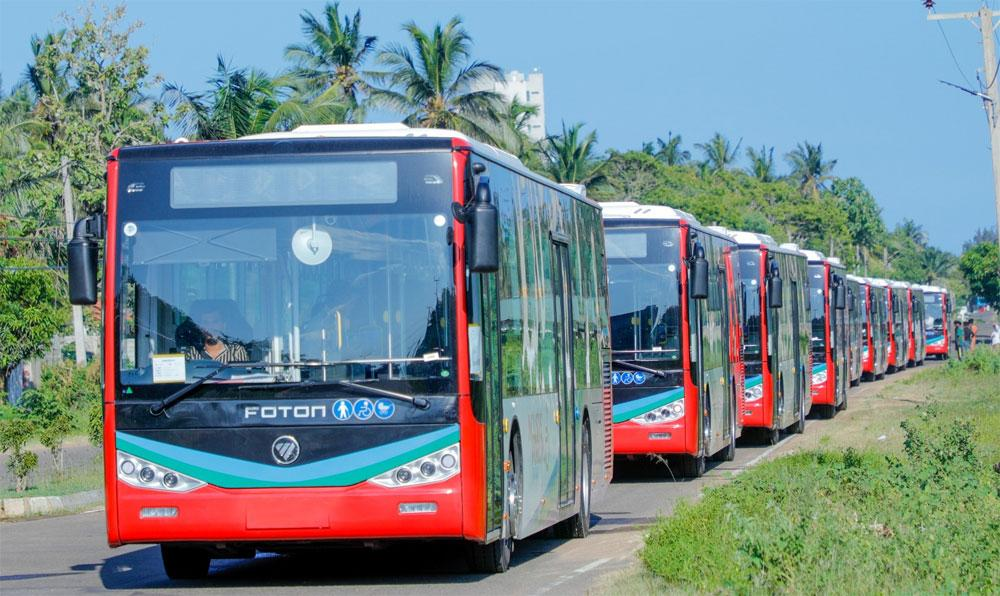
Newly introduced LMT buses

On 11 March 2026, 10 specialised, air-conditioned low-floor buses designed for passengers with special needs arrived from China under 'Clean Sri Lanka' initiative.

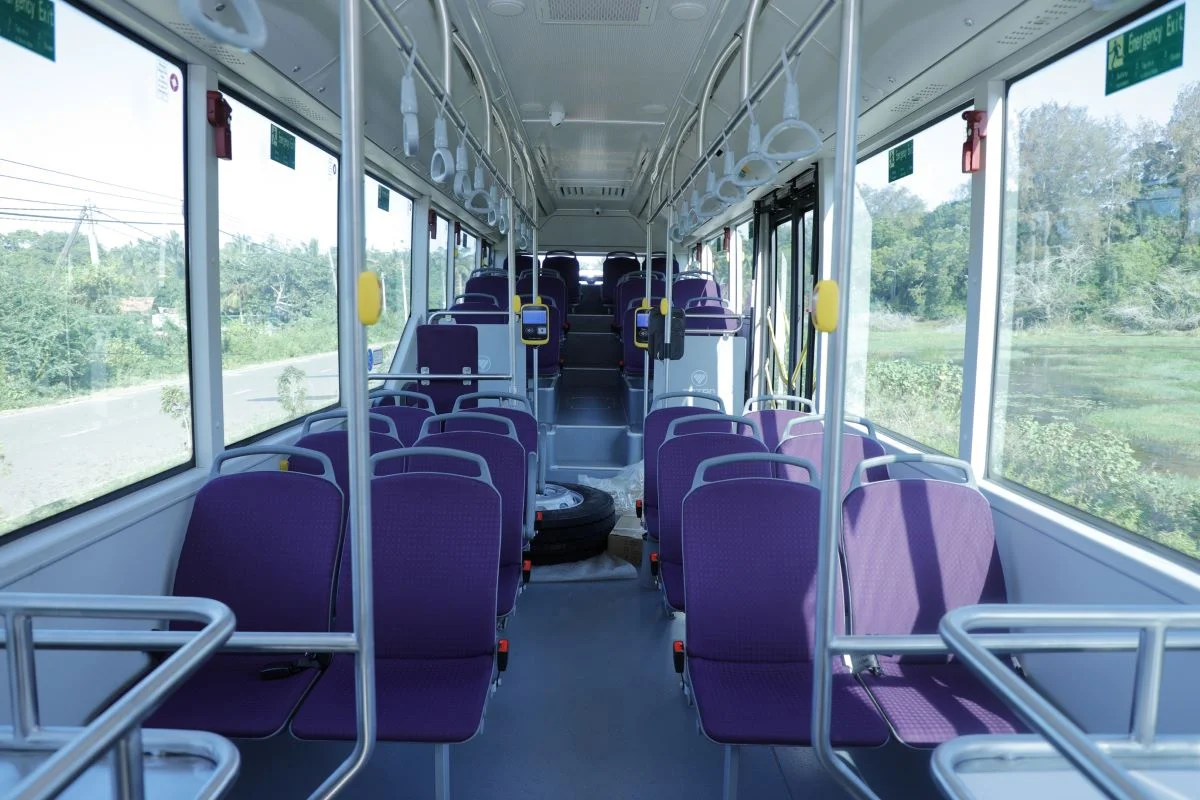
Metro Bus interior

These buses are Foton C12s, and can accommodate a total passenger capacity of around 80+ passengers, these buses are air conditioned and feature QR/card-based fare collection systems, allowing users to pay either with their phones utilising the LMT-GO application to scan a QR code or by paying with either cash or card with the conducter. The service includes specialised wheelchair systems, which can be deployed manually. The drivers and Conducters of LMT will undergo special training provided by the Ministry of Social Services, covering bus technology, passenger safety, professional ethics, passenger care, and basic sign language for communicating with passengers with disabilities.

The main incentive is to increase public ridership and to curtail the traffic congestion while also providing a high quality service for all in major parts of Sri Lanka, such as Colombo, Galle, Kandy and various other districts throughout the country.

On the 23rd of July 2026, 07 new Refurbished low floor buses arrived from Japan, these buses are Nissan Diesel Space Runner RA PKG-RA274KANs, previously operated by the Yokohoma Municipal Bus organisation, they primarily served from 2005/2007 to 2018/2023 before being withdrawn from service. These buses will be deployed in the coming months to the LMT fleet following retrofits.

On the 29th of July, 2026, A shipment of 104 Foton C12 low floor buses arrived at Colombo port, these buses were fitted with card‑based fare collection systems and, following installation and testing, were placed into service on the 29th of September, these buses will also be deployed on 9 routes connecting Colombo and it's suburbs. With plans to expedite the launch of the second phase of the project in the city of Kandy and other major cities.

On the 4th of August, 2026 the Cabinet of Sri Lanka approved the purchase of 50 more additional low floor buses for LMT, these buses will be deployed by the end of the year.

Lanka Metro Transit fleet
Image	Model	No. of buses	On order	Notes	Ref.
	Foton C12	114	50	10 buses were granted under the 'Clean Sri Lanka' program.	
Refurbished Mitsubishi Fuso Aero Star buses for LMT received under a grant scheme	Nissan Diesel Space Runner A (Space Runner RA/PKG-RA274KAN)	8	–	Refurbished low-floor buses imported under a Grant by Japan.	
Total		122	50		

=== Depots ===
After the launch of the pilot project, plans were underway to construct depots across the Western Province of Sri Lanka to maintain these new buses, The first depot commenced construction in Kadawatha on the 4th of May 2026. New depots are planned in Ekala, Ratmalana, Homagama and Thalangama, bringing the total number of Metro depots in the Western Province to five. In addition the Ekala Depot will serve as the main central service centre for major fleet repairs and heavy maintenance.

On the 4th of September, 2026. The Talangama Metro Bus Depot was opened to the public. This Metro depot is known as the "MetroLake", various unique names have been given to various depots for the easy identification of such depots. Subsequently, on the 7th of September, 2026, The Kadawatha Metro Bus Depot was also vested to the public. This Metro depot is known as the "MetroLink". On the 9th of September 2026, The Ekala Metro Bus Depot commenced operations as "MetroCore". "MetroCoast" depot in Ratmalana also officially commenced operations on 21 September 2026.

Lanka Metro Transit Depots
Depot Name	Codename	Opening Date	Primary Region Served
Thalangama	MetroLake	September 4, 2026	Battaramulla / Kotte sector
Kadawatha	MetroLink	September 7, 2026	Gampaha District
Ekala	MetroCore	September 9, 2026	Ja-Ela / Ekala zone
Ratmalana	MetroCoast	September 21, 2026	Colombo South coastal corridor
-	MetroDrive	Planned	-
-	MetroBase	Planned	-

=== Routes ===
The current fleet of around 122 buses run mainly on seven main routes in Greater Colombo Metropolitan region. The plans for the second phase include expansion into the Jaffna, Kandy and Galle districts, with a long-term goal of serving eight major cities within three years.

Lanka Metro Transit routes
Route	Terminals		Via	Days of operation	Distance
Route	From	To	Via	Days of operation	Distance
CM01	Makumbura; Makumbura Multimodal Centre (MMC)	Pettah / Fort; Central Bus Stand, Pettah	Pannipitiya → Battaramulla → Borella		23.3 km
CM02	Millennium City	Fort; Central Bus Stand, Pettah	Athurugiriya → Malabe → Battaramulla		22.3 km
CM03	Makumbura; Makumbura Multimodal Centre (MMC)	Kadawatha; Kadawatha Multimodal Center (KMC)	National Cancer Institute	Daily	34.8 km
CM04	Dematagoda; Dematagoda Railway Station	Panadura; Panadura Base Hospital	Dehiwala-Mount Lavinia → Moratuwa		14 km
CM05	Battaramulla; Thalangama LMT Depot	Ekala; Ekala LMT Depot	Rajagiriya → Wattala → Ja-Ela		29.9 km
CM06	Kollupitiya; Kollupitiya Railway Station	Bambalapitiya	Liberty Plaza → Town Hall → Havelock City		23.3 km
CM08	Kesbewa; Makumbura Multimodal Centre (MMC)	Pettah; Central Bus Stand, Pettah			35.7 km

== See also ==
- Transport in Sri Lanka
- Sri Lanka Transport Board
