= Asset purchase agreement =

Contract between a buyer and seller

An asset purchase agreement (APA) is an agreement between a buyer and a seller that finalizes terms and conditions related to the purchase and sale of a company's assets. In an APA transaction, it is not necessary for the buyer to purchase all of the assets of the company. In fact, it is common for a buyer to exclude certain assets in an APA. Provisions of an APA may include payment of purchase price, monthly installments, liens and encumbrances on the assets, condition precedent for the closing, etc. An APA differs from a stock purchase agreement (SPA) under which company shares, title to assets, and title to liabilities are also sold. In an APA, the buyer must select specific assets and avoid redundant assets. These assets are itemized in a schedule to the APA. The buyer in a SPA is purchasing shares of the company. In this case, itemization is not necessary due to transfer of company's ownership occurs as is. The APA is the legal mechanism for executing a corporate merger or acquisition.

The oil and gas industry does not distinguish between an asset and stock purchase in naming its related purchase agreement. In this industry, whether purchasing assets or stock, the definitive agreement is referred to as the purchase and sale agreement (PSA).

== Purpose ==
Defining and controlling behavior is a major objective of the APA. The buyer must represent its authority to purchase the asset. The seller must represent its authority to sell the asset. Additionally, the seller represents that the purchase price of the asset is equal to its value, and that the seller is not in financial or legal trouble.

In the context of a merger or acquisition transaction, asset purchase agreements have a distinct set of advantages and disadvantages compared to using an equity (or stock) purchase agreement or a merger agreement. In an equity or merger acquisition, the purchaser is guaranteed to receive all of the target's assets without exception, but also automatically assumes all of the target's liabilities. An asset purchase agreement, alternatively, allows not only for a transaction in which only some of the assets are transferred (which is sometimes desired) but also allows the parties to negotiate which liabilities of the target are expressly assumed by the purchaser, and allows the purchaser to leave behind those liabilities it does not wish to accept (or does not know about). A disadvantage of an asset purchase agreement is that it can often result in a greater number of change of control issues. For example, contracts held by a target, and acquired by a purchaser, will often require the consent of the counterparty in the context of an asset deal, whereas it is less common that such consent will be needed in connection with an equity sale or merger agreement.

Other than having the flexibility to sell only certain assets, rather than the entire company, asset purchase agreements typically also include detailed provisions regarding the transfer of liabilities from the seller.

== See also ==
- Tender offer
