= Transport in Sri Lanka =

Transport in Sri Lanka is based on its road network, which is centred on the country's commercial capital Colombo. A rail network handles a portion of Sri Lanka's transport needs. There are navigable waterways, harbours and three international airports: in Katunayake, 35 kilometres (22 mi) north of Colombo, in Hambantota, and in Jaffna.

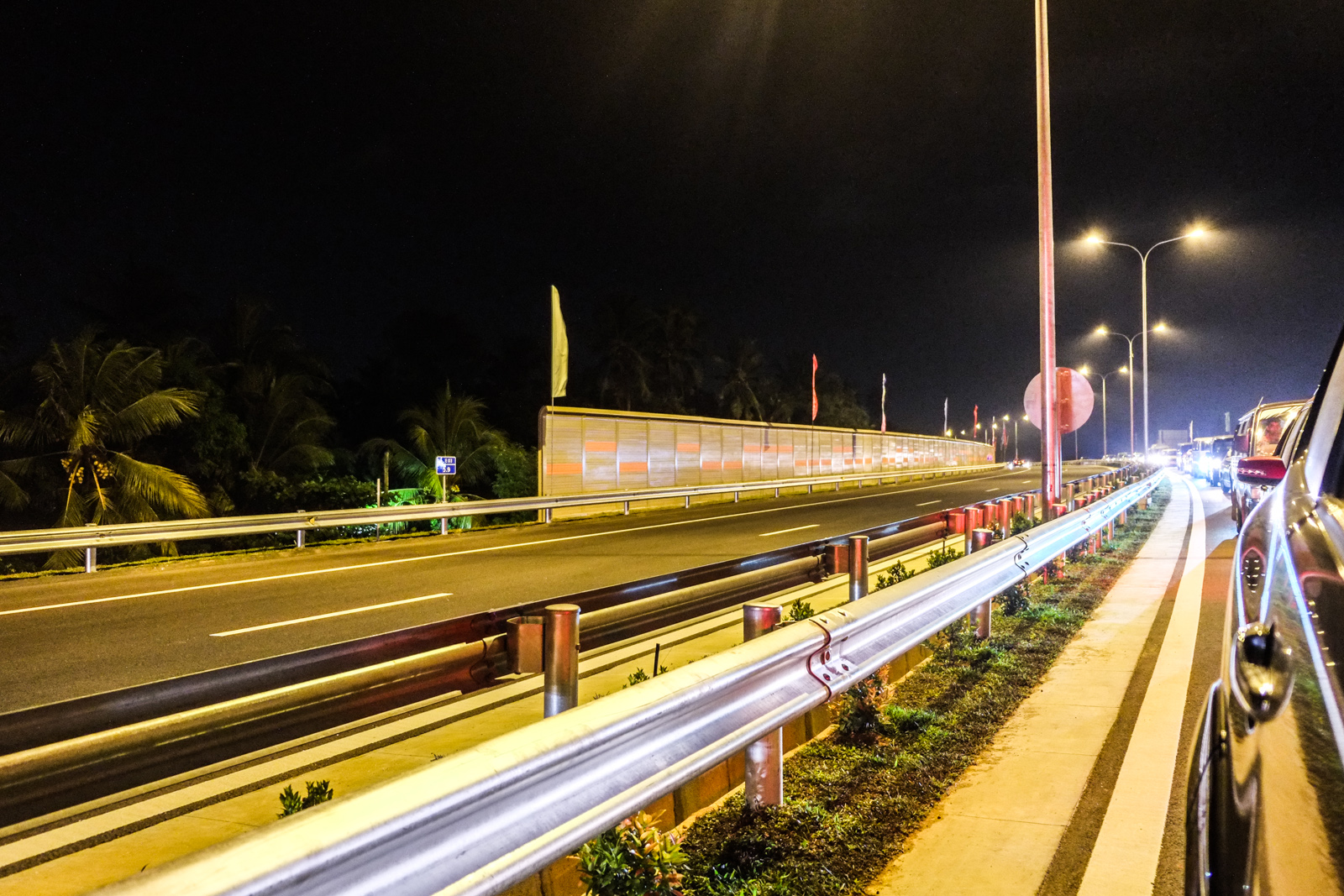
Colombo–Katunayake Expressway at night

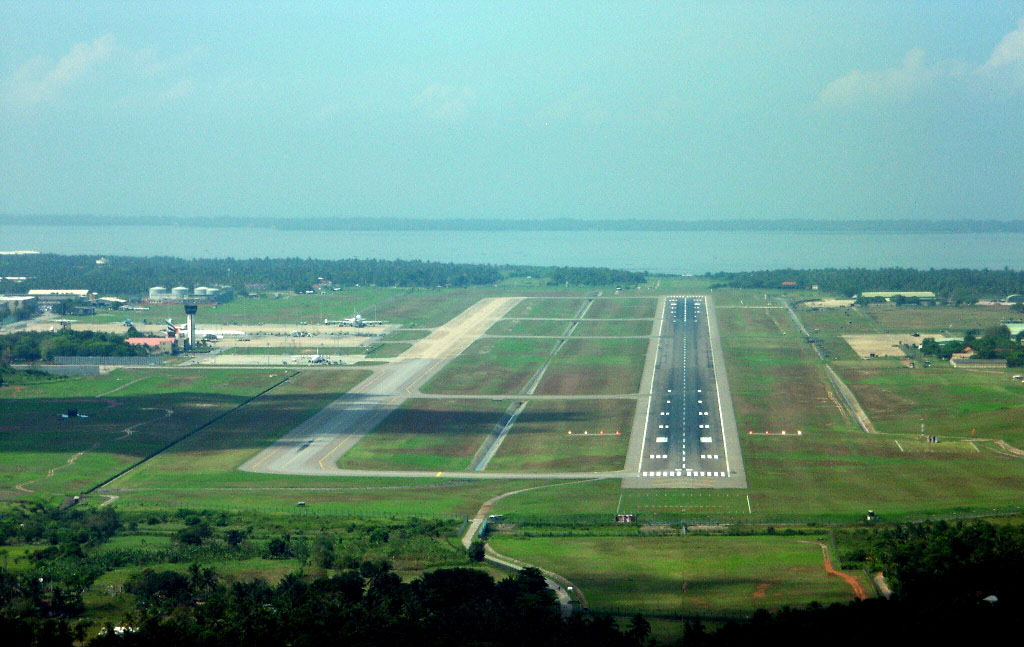
Colombo Airport

== Road ==
Roads account for about 93 percent of Sri Lanka's land transport. In 2022, there were 12,255.401 kilometres (7,615.153 mi) of A- and B-class roads and 312.586 kilometres (194.232 mi) of expressways. The main modes of transportation in Sri Lanka are buses, motorcycles and passenger cars (including taxi service).

=== Classification ===
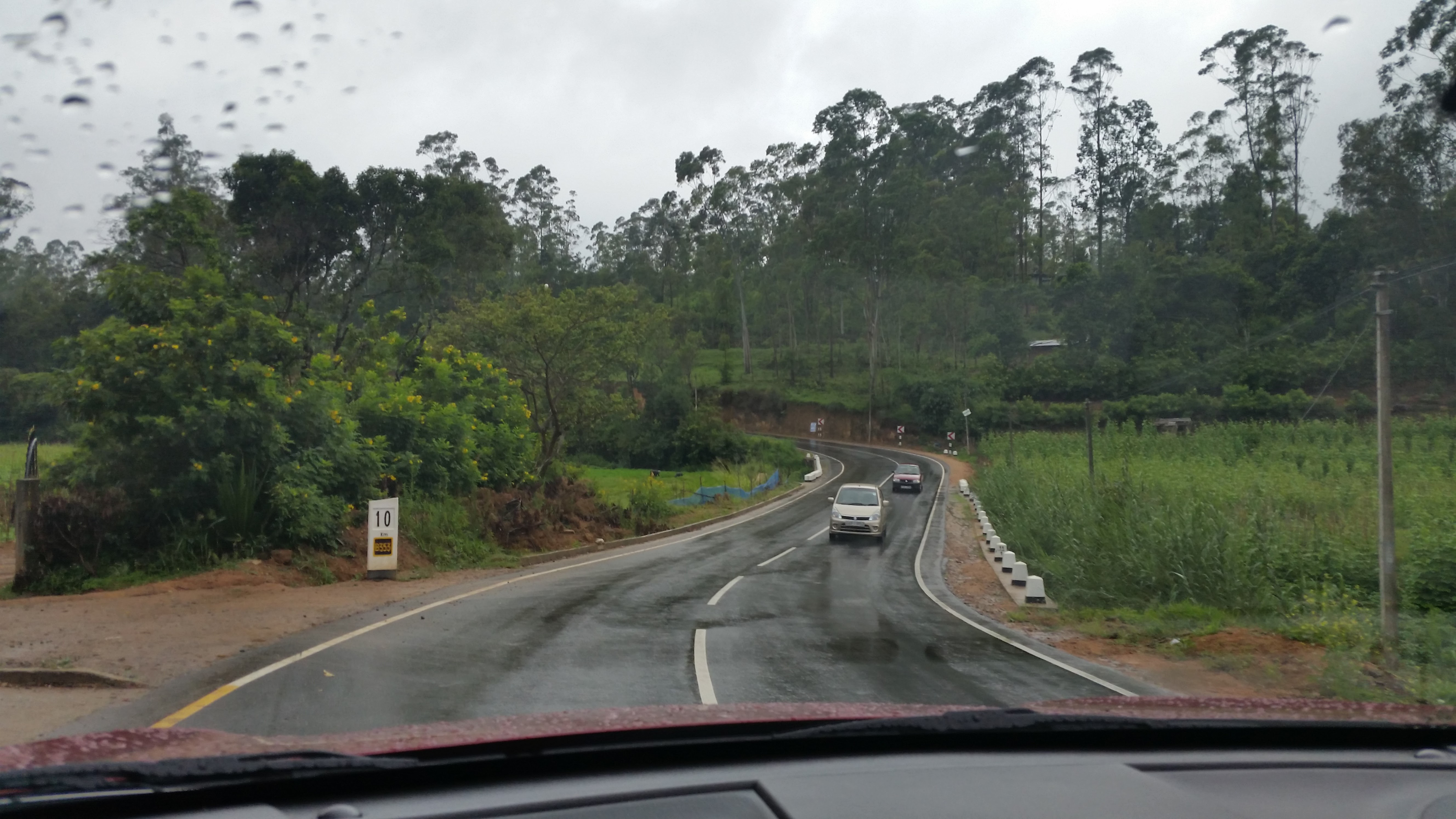
Single-carriage B-Grade road

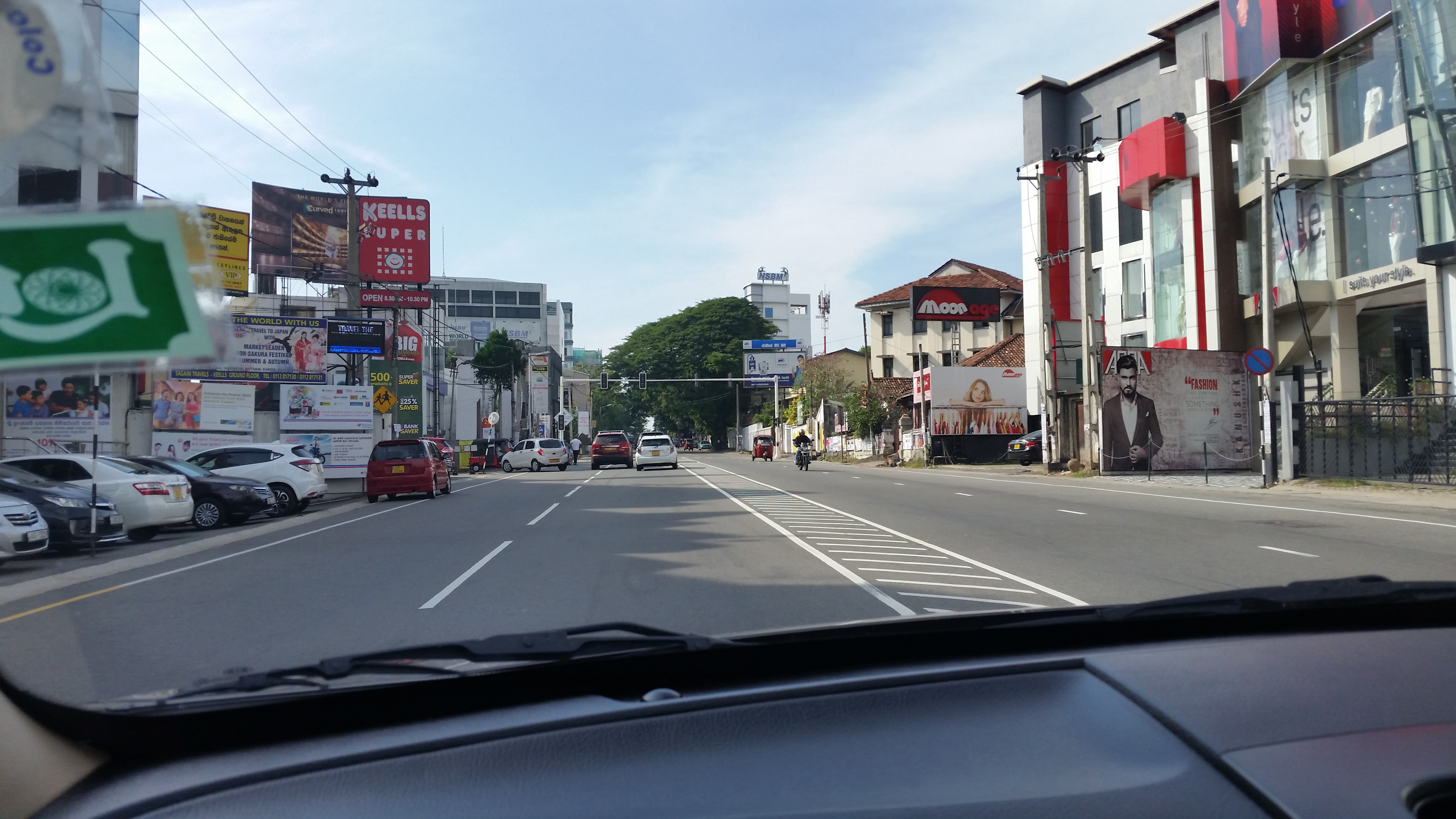
Dual-carriage A-Grade road

Sri Lanka's roads are graded E, A, B and C.

Grade	Description	Speed limit
E	High-speed, high-traffic expressways duplicating heavily travelled A-Grade routes	100 km/h (62 mph)
A	The national highway network	70 km/h (43 mph)
B	Major provincial roads used as feeders for A- and E-Grade roads	60 km/h (37 mph)
C	Local residential roads	50 km/h (31 mph)

=== Expressways ===
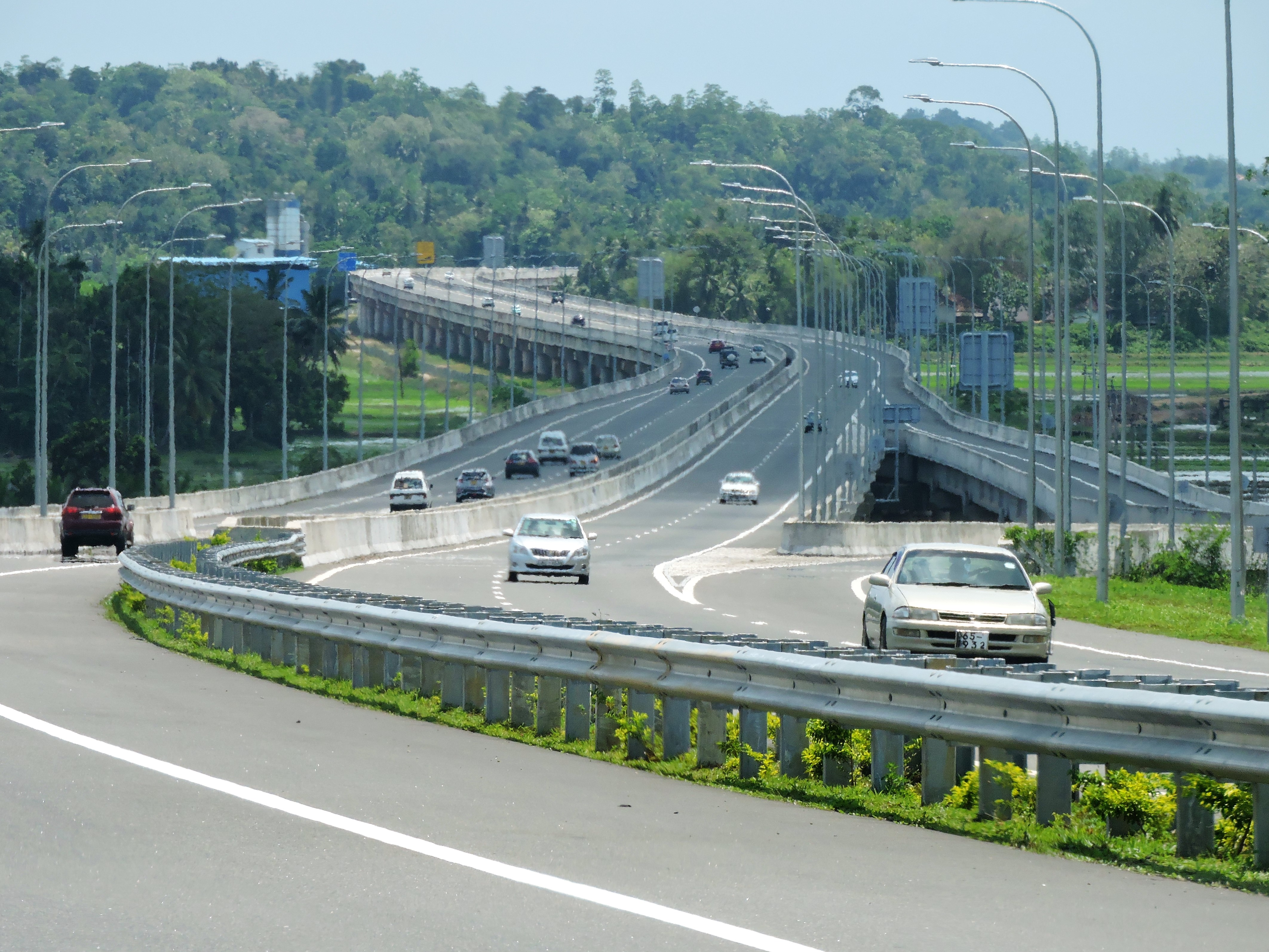
Dual-carriageway E-Grade road

The Colombo–Matara Expressway is a 126-kilometre-long (78 mi) motorway linking Colombo, Galle and Matara which was built in 2011 to develop the economy of the Southern Province. The Colombo–Katunayake Expressway, Colombo-Kandy Expressway and Outer Circular Expressway (Colombo bypass road) are under construction, and a Colombo–Padeniya expressway has been proposed. The Sri Lankan government has proposed three elevated highways connecting the three main expressways:

- From Kirulapone to Kadawatha (about 19 km), connecting the Outer Circular Expressway at Kadawatha and the Colombo–Katunayake Expressway at Peliyagoda
- From Colombo Fort to Kottawa (about 21 km), connecting the Colombo–Matara and Outer Circular Expressways at Kottawa
- From Colombo Fort to the Peliyagoda interchange on the Colombo–Katunayake Expressway (about 5 km)

Number	Name	Start	End	Length (km)	Lanes	Cost (USD)	Cost/km (USD)
E01	Colombo–Matara Expressway	Kottawa	Matara	126	4 (provision for 6)	765.4 million	6.07 million
E02	Outer Circular Expressway	Kottawa	Kerawalapitiya	29	6	1.12 billion	38.6 million
E03	Colombo–Katunayake Expressway	New Kelani Bridge	Katunayake	25.8	6,4 (provision for 6)	291 million	11.28 million
E04	Colombo–Kandy Expressway	Kadawatha	Katugastota	98.9	4,6	4.5 Billion	Under construction

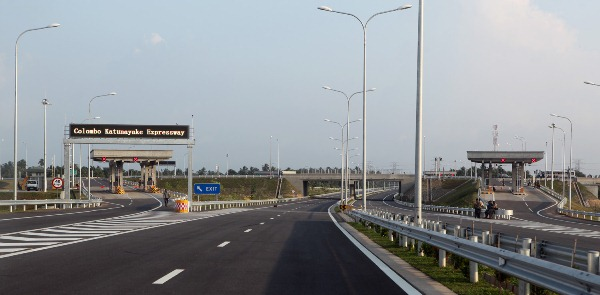
The-Expressway at Ja-ela

=== National highways ===
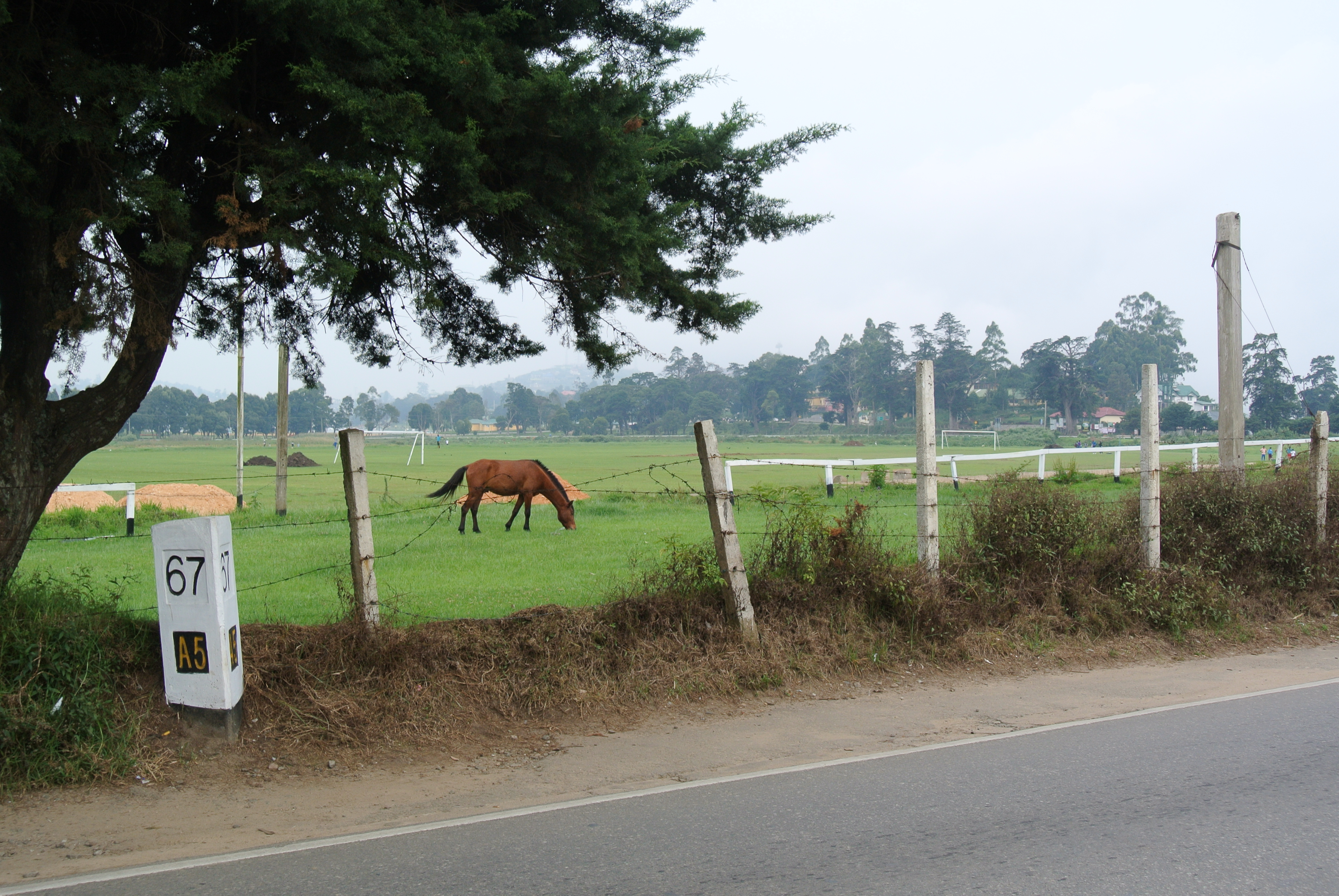
Marker on the A5 highway in Nuwara Eliya

Sri Lanka's national highways are graded A or B. A-Grade roads are subdivided as AA, AB or AC.

Road grade	Length
A	4,221.37 kilometres (2,623.04 mi)
AA	3,724.26 kilometres (2,314.15 mi)
AB	466.92 kilometres (290.13 mi)
AC	30.19 kilometres (18.76 mi)
B	7,943.65 kilometres (4,935.96 mi)
Total of A- and B-grade roads	12,165.02 kilometres (7,558.99 mi)

Road density is highest in the southwest, particularly the area around Colombo. Highways are in good condition, with a smooth bitumen surface and road markings; however, some rural roads are in poor condition. Heavily travelled roads are being upgraded and repaved. Public transport is widely available in many rural areas.

=== Buses ===
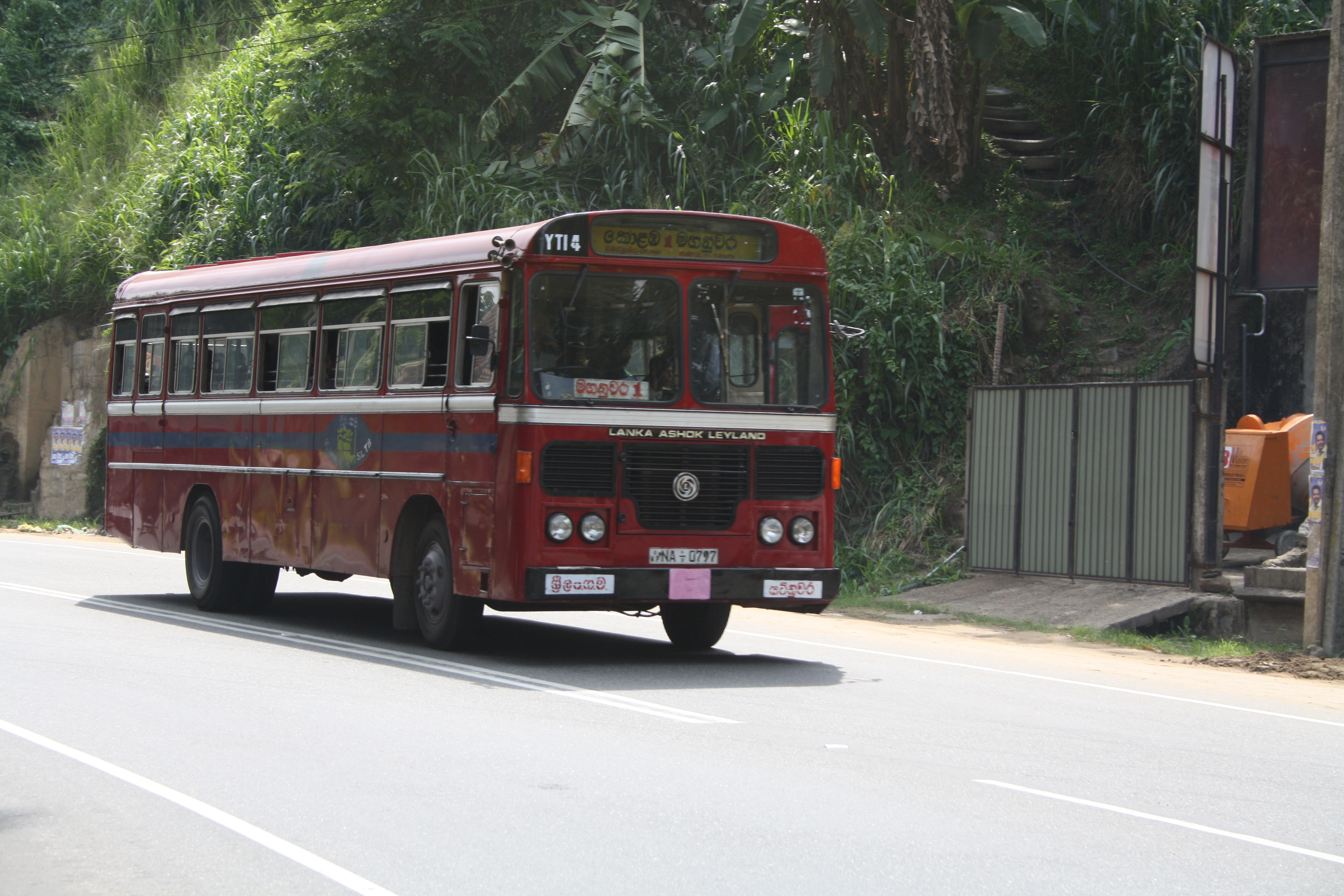
SLTB inter-city bus

Buses are the principal mode of public transport. Service is provided by the state-owned Sri Lanka Transport Board (SLTB) and privately owned buses. The SLTB has urban and rural routes.

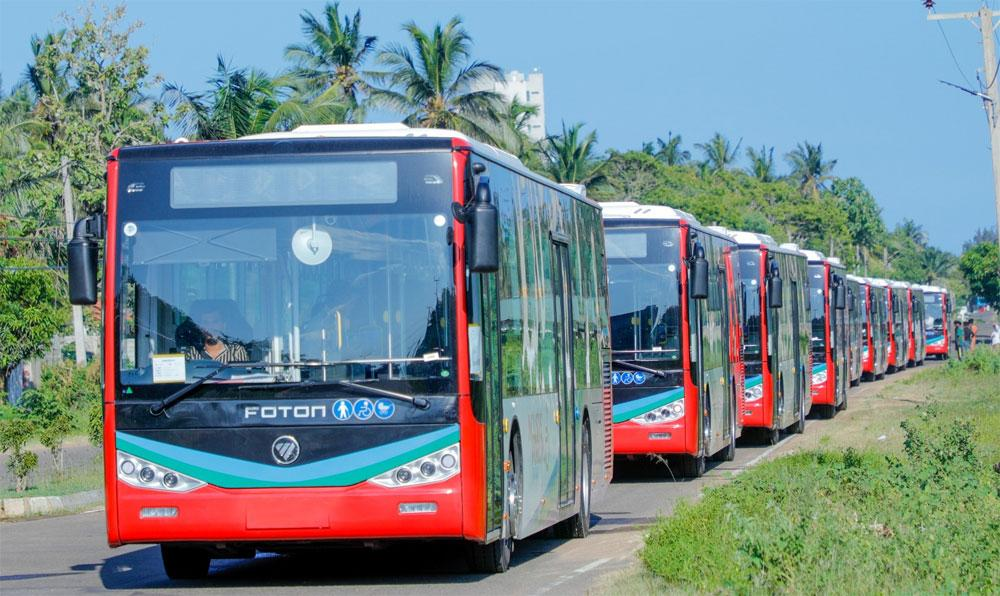
Lanka Metro Transit buses

Colombo has an extensive, bus-based public transport system, with the Central Bus Stand in Pettah as its hub. The city's road network consists of radial links (or arterial routes), which link the city and district centres, and orbital links intersecting the arterial routes. Most bus routes are on the radial links, without dedicated bus lanes due to high peak traffic volume. The newly introduced Lanka Metro Transit is a bus rapid transit service introduced in the capital's metropolitan region in April 2026 in order to provide transportation under the 'Clean Sri Lanka' program and operated as a subsidiary of the SLTB. The system is part of wider efforts to reduce traffic congestion and encourage a shift from private to public transport in Colombo.

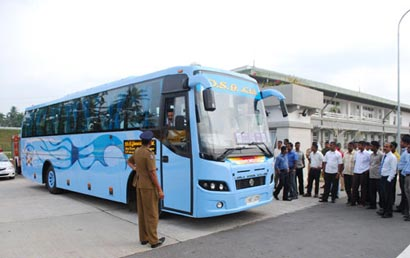
Privately-owned bus in Sri Lanka

Inter-city routes connect many of the country's major population centres. Some service is available on the E01 and E03 expressways, with modern King Long buses.

=== Automobiles ===
Sri Lanka modern transportation dates back 120 years, to 1902. When the first ever car entered Sri Lanka 8 HP single cylinder Rover brought down by Edgar Money, a local British businessman. Roads at the time were barely built and linked only a few key towns around the island. Prior to the 1960s, British and European car brands such as Ford, Mini, Rolls-Royce and Rover dominated the post-colonial Sri Lanka automobile market. Purchasing an automobile was once a luxury reserved for the upper crust of society, as vehicle imports was closely regulated, and taxes exorbitant. In the 1960s, there was an abrupt halt to the influx of vehicles to Sri Lanka when the Government banned all imports in order to fix a foreign exchange deficit. However, there have been various car assembly efforts since the 1980s. Upali Corporation assembled Fiat and Mazda vehicles. However, by the mid-1980s, it was finished.

== Rail ==
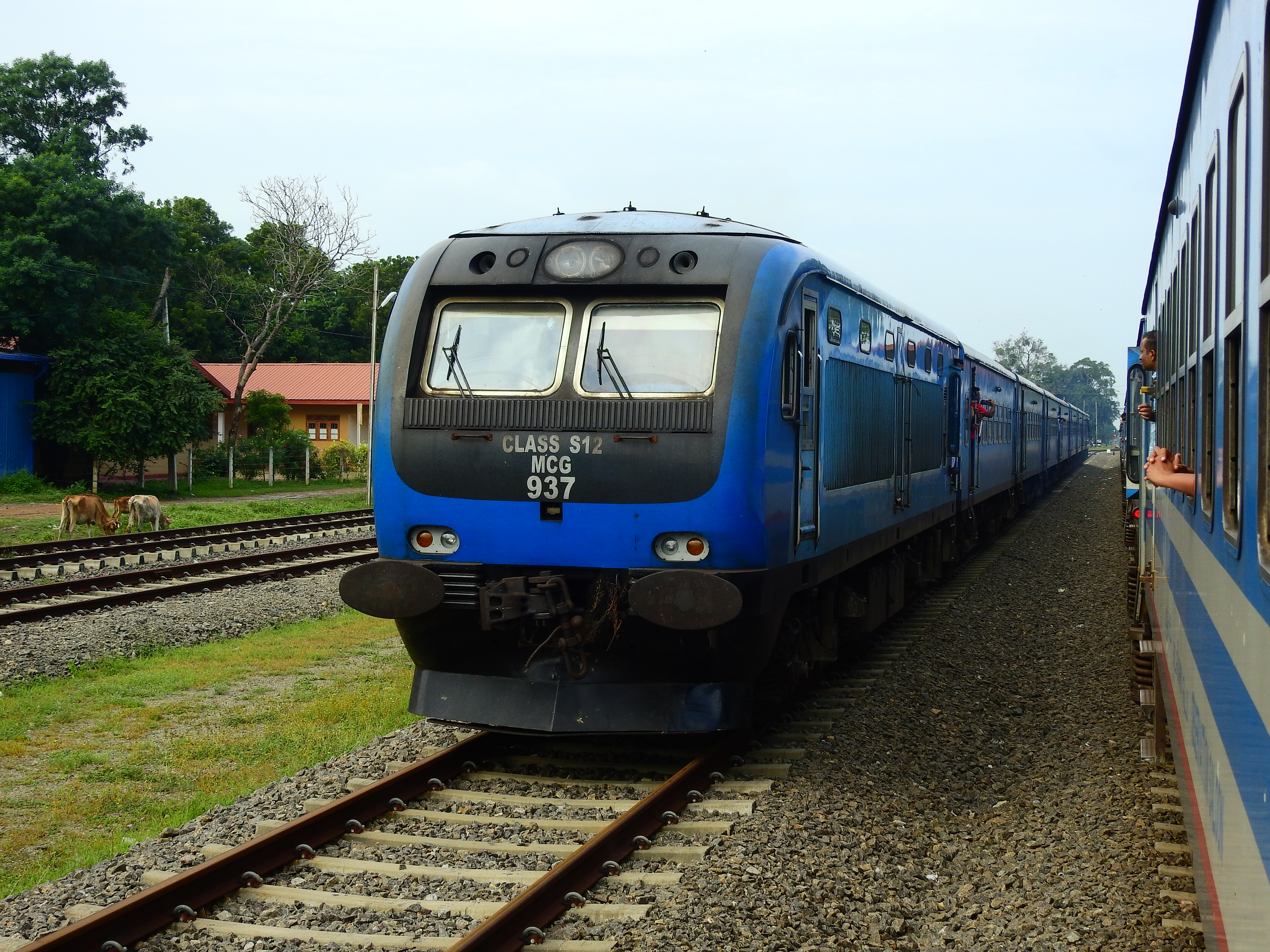
Class S12 DMU commuter train in Colombo

Sri Lanka's rail network

Sri Lanka Railways consists of an intercity network connecting major population centres and commuter rail serving Colombo commuters. Sri Lanka Railways operates the country's railway network, which includes about 1,450 km (901 mi) of track. Colombo is its hub. Trains connect the main cities of the country's nine provinces.

Most of the railways were developed during the British colonial period, with the first line (from Colombo to Kandy) opening on 26 April 1867. The railway was introduced as an economical means of transporting goods produced on the tea, rubber and coconut plantations to the main port in Colombo. After the 1950s, the Sri Lankan economy became focused on industry rather than plantation agriculture. The road network also grew; with the introduction of lorries, a faster means of transporting goods, the amount of goods transported by rail declined. Since their network is more focused on plantation areas than on population and service centres, the railways have generated large losses.

Their potential for expansion was demonstrated when Minister of Transport Leslie Goonewardene extended the coastal line from Puttalam to Aruvakalu in 1974 to serve the cement factory there. The railway is modernising and extending that line to facilitate faster trains and improved efficiency. Electrification of the network's busiest sections was proposed in 2010 to improve energy efficiency and sustainability, but no work was done. The railway is extending the coastal line from Matara to Kataragama via Hambantota.

The Sri Lankan rail network passes scenic landscapes—particularly the Colombo-Badulla main line, which hugs the country's steep highlands. The railways connect the cities of Gampaha, Kandy,Badulla, Matale, Galle, Matara, Jaffna, Kankesanturai, Mannar, Anuradhapura, Polonnaruwa, Negombo, Kurunegala, Avissawella, Kalutara, Batticaloa, Trincomalee, Gampola, Nawalapitiya, Vavuniya, Puttalam and Chilaw with Colombo.

The narrow-gauge Kelani Valley Line, from Colombo to Avissawella, was converted to 5 ft 6 in (1,676 mm) broad gauge. The other narrow-gauge lines, from Nanu Oya to Nuwara Eliya, Avissawella to Yatiyantota and Avissawella to Ratnapura and Opanayaka, were dismantled due to financial losses. In 2007, the Sri Lankan government announced plans for Matara-Kataragama (113 km), Padukka-Hambantota-Ratnapura (210 km), Kurunegala-Dambulla-Habarana (80 km) and Panadura-Horana (18 km) lines by 2014.

== Air ==
=== SriLankan Airlines ===
SriLankan Airlines is Sri Lanka's national airline. Founded in 1979 as Air Lanka, it changed its name to SriLankan Airlines when it received partial foreign ownership in 1998. It operates to Asia, Europe and Australia from its base at Bandaranaike International Airport in Colombo; the airline's main office is in the Airline Centre at the airport. The airline joined the Oneworld alliance in May 2014.

SriLankan Airlines flies to 33 destinations in 21 countries.

=== Airports ===
==== International flights ====
Sri Lanka has 3 international airports:

- Bandaranaike International Airport, the country's main international airport, located in Katunayake, 32.5 km north of Colombo.
- Mattala Rajapaksa International Airport, located 18 km north of Hambantota, primarily serving charter flights.
- Jaffna International Airport, located in Palaly, 13 km north of Jaffna. Handles flights to two cities in Tamil Nadu, India.

==== Domestic flights ====
Domestic operators are Cinnamon Air, FitsAir, Helitours, Senok, and Simplifly. Sri Lanka has 19 airports.

Airports with paved runways
Length	Number
Over 3,047 metres (9,997 ft)	2
1,524 to 2,437 metres (5,000 to 7,995 ft)	6
914 to 1,523 metres (2,999 to 4,997 ft)	7
Total	15

Airports with unpaved runways
Length	Number
1,524 to 2,437 metres (5,000 to 7,995 ft)	1
Under 914 metres (2,999 ft)	3
Total	4

== Water ==
Sri Lanka has 160 kilometres (99 mi) of inland waterways (primarily on rivers in the southwest), navigable by shallow-draught boats.

=== Ports and harbours ===
==== Colombo Port ====
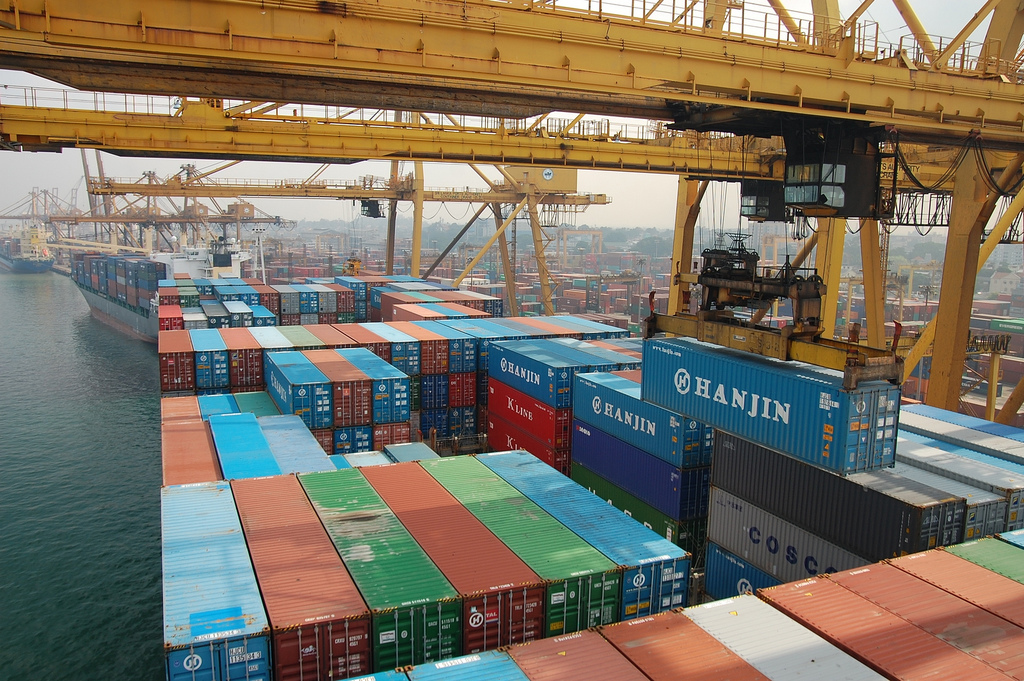
Container handling at the Port of Colombo

Sri Lanka has deep-water ports at Colombo, Hambantota, Galle and Trincomalee. Colombo has the highest cargo volume, with an estimated capacity of 5.7 million TEUs. The port began a large-scale expansion project at a cost of US$1.2 billion in 2008 to increase its capacity and capabilities. The project, headed by the Sri Lanka Ports Authority and built by the Hyundai Engineering and Construction Company, was expected to be completed by 11 April 2012. It consists of four new 1,200-metre-long (3,900 ft) terminals which can accommodate three berths each, alongside a depth of 18 m (59 ft) (which can be deepened to 23 m [75 ft]). The channel width of the harbour will be 560 metres (1,840 ft) and its depth 20 metres (66 ft), with a harbour-basin depth of 18 metres (59 ft) and a 600-metre (2,000 ft) turning circle. The project was expected to increase the annual container-handling capacity to about 12 million TEUs and accommodate 12,000-TEU container vessels.

==== Hambantota Port ====
Construction of Magampura Mahinda Rajapaksa Port (also known as the Port of Hambantota) began in January 2008. It will be Sri Lanka's second-largest port, after Colombo. The port will serve ships travelling along one of the world's busiest sea lanes: the east-west route running 6 to 10 nautical miles (11 to 19 km; 6.9 to 11.5 mi) south of Hambantota. The first phase of the port will consist of two 600-metre (2,000 ft) general-purpose berths, a 310-metre (1,020 ft) bunkering berth and a 120-metre (390 ft) small-craft berth. The port will also contain a bunkering facility and tank farm, which will include eight tanks for marine fuel and three tanks each for aviation fuel and liquefied petroleum gas (LPG). A 15-floor administrative complex will also be constructed as part of the project. Later phases will raise the port's annual capacity to 20 million TEUs, making it the largest port constructed on land in the 21st century.

==== Dikkowitta Fishery Harbour ====
The Dikkowitta Fishery Harbour, near Colombo in Wattala, Gampaha, Western Province, will cost an estimated $73 million and is projected to be Asia's largest fishing harbour. With unloading and packing facilities meeting the requirements of fish-importing countries (the EU, Japan and the US), it will be an alternative site for the Mutwal fishery harbour. Facilities will include a southern basin for export-oriented fishing vessels, a northern basin for local fishing vessels, a service facility for boat repairs, cleaning and lifting and a fish-processing facility with three cold rooms.

==== Kankesanthurai Port ====
The harbour at Kankesanturai, north of Jaffna, is navigable by ships of relatively shallow draught and was inactive during the civil war. The port is being restored and deepened with Indian aid.

=== Merchant marine ===
In 2010, Sri Lanka had 21 ships (1,000 gross tonnage (GT) or over), totalling 192,190 GT and 293,832 tonnes deadweight (DWT): four bulk carriers, 13 cargo ships, one chemical tanker, one container ship and two petroleum tankers.

== Pipelines ==
In 1987, Sri Lanka had 62 kilometres (39 mi) of pipelines for crude oil and petroleum products.

== See also ==
- Sri Lanka Railways
- Sri Lanka Transport Board
- Lanka Metro Transit
- Road signs in Sri Lanka
- Highway museum complex, Kiribathkumbura
- List of railway stations in Sri Lanka
- National railway museum, Kadugannawa
