= Lakdhanavi Power Station =

- Country: Sri Lanka
- Location: Sapugaskanda
- Coordinates: 6°57′28″N 79°57′03″E
- Status: Operational
- Commission date: 1997
- Owner: LTL Holdings
- Operator: Lakdhanavi Limited

Thermal power station
- Primary fuel: Fuel oil

Power generation
- Nameplate capacity: 24 MW

The Lakdhanavi Power Station (also sometimes referred to as the Lakdhanavi Sapugaskanda Power Station) is a 24 MW thermal power station built in Sapugaskanda, Sri Lanka. Operated by Lakdhanavi (Private) Limited, it is one of three power stations in the Sapugaskanda region, the other two being the government-owned 160 MW Sapugaskanda Power Station, and the 51 MW Asia Power Sapugaskanda Power Station.

== See also ==
- Asia Power Sapugaskanda Power Station
- Sapugaskanda Power Station
- List of power stations in Sri Lanka
