= Economic policy of the Sirimavo Bandaranaike Government =

The economic policy of the Sirimavo Bandaranaike Government was the economic policy of Sri Lanka between 1960 and 1965 and from 1970 to 1977. It was shaped by socialist principles, state intervention, economic self-sufficiency and the redistribution of wealth. Her government pursued a state-directed economic model, commonly associated with Dirigisme, in which the state played a central role in directing economic activity, controlling key industries and regulating foreign trade.

== Nationalisation and state control ==
To further her husband's policy of nationalising key sectors of the economy, Bandaranaike established a corporation with public-private shareholders, taking control of seven newspapers. She nationalised banking, foreign trade, and insurance, as well as the petroleum industry. In taking over the Bank of Ceylon and establishing branches of the newly created People's Bank, Bandaranaike aimed to provide services to communities with no previous banking facilities, spurring local business development. In December 1960, Bandaranaike nationalised all the parochial schools that were receiving state funding. In doing so she curtailed the influence of the Catholic minority, who tended to be members of the economic and political elite, and extended the influence of Buddhist groups. Beginning in 1961, trade unions began a series of strikes in protest of high inflation and taxes. One such strike immobilised the transport system, motivating Bandaranaike to nationalise the transport board.

Other cabinet ministers were reassigned in an attempt to stem the drift toward Soviet trade partnerships, which had gained ground after the creation of the Ceylon Petroleum Corporation. The Petroleum Corporation had been launched in 1961 to bypass the monopolistic pricing imposed on Middle Eastern oil imports, allowing Ceylon to import oil from the United Arab Republic and the Soviet Union. Some of the storage facilities of western oil operatives were co-opted with a compensation agreement, but continuing disputes over non-payment resulted in suspension of foreign aid from the United States in February 1963. In reaction to the suspension of aid, the Parliament passed the Ceylon Petroleum Corporation Amendment Act nationalising all distribution, import-export, sales and supply of most oil products in the country, with the changes taking effect in January 1964.

In December 1970, the Business Undertaking Acquisition Act was passed, allowing the state to nationalise any business with more than 100 employees. Ostensibly, the move aimed to reduce foreign control of key tea and rubber production, but it stunted both domestic and foreign investment in industry and development.

== Economic management ==
Lack of support for austerity measures, specifically the inability to import adequate rice – the main dietary staple – caused the resignation of Minister Felix Dias Bandaranaike during her first term.

During her second term, Bandaranaike faced budget deficits of $195 million – caused by rising energy and food-importation costs and declining revenue from coconut, rubber and tea exports – Bandaranaike attempted to centralise the economy and implement price controls. Pressed by the leftist members of her coalition to nationalise the foreign banks of British, Indian and Pakistani origin, she realised that doing so would impact the need for credit. As she had in her previous regime, she tried to balance the flow of foreign assistance from both capitalist and communist partners.

The 1973 oil crisis had a traumatic effect on the Sri Lankan economy. Still dependent on foreign assistance, goods and monetary aid from Australia, Canada, China, Denmark, Hungary, and the World Bank, Bandaranaike eased the austerity programmes that limited importation of consumer goods. The United States terminated aid grants, which required no repayment, and changed to a policy of providing foreign loans. Devaluation of the Sri Lankan currency, coupled with inflation and high taxes, slowed economic growth, consequently creating cyclical pressure to address deficits with even higher taxes and austerity measures. Uncontrolled inflation between 1973 and 1974 led to economic uncertainty and public dissatisfaction.

== Later assessments ==
In a later assessment of Bandaranaike’s economic policies, President Maithripala Sirisena argued that continued support for domestic industries could have strengthened Sri Lanka’s manufacturing sector. He criticised the open-economy policies introduced in 1977 during the premiership of J. R. Jayewardene, arguing that increased imports weakened local industries. Other commentators contended that nationalisation had failed to deliver its expected economic benefits, citing losses among state-owned enterprises, bureaucratic inefficiency, political interference and shortages of capital, technology and managerial expertise. After 1977, the United National Party government moved towards economic liberalisation and privatisation.
