= Road signs in Sri Lanka =

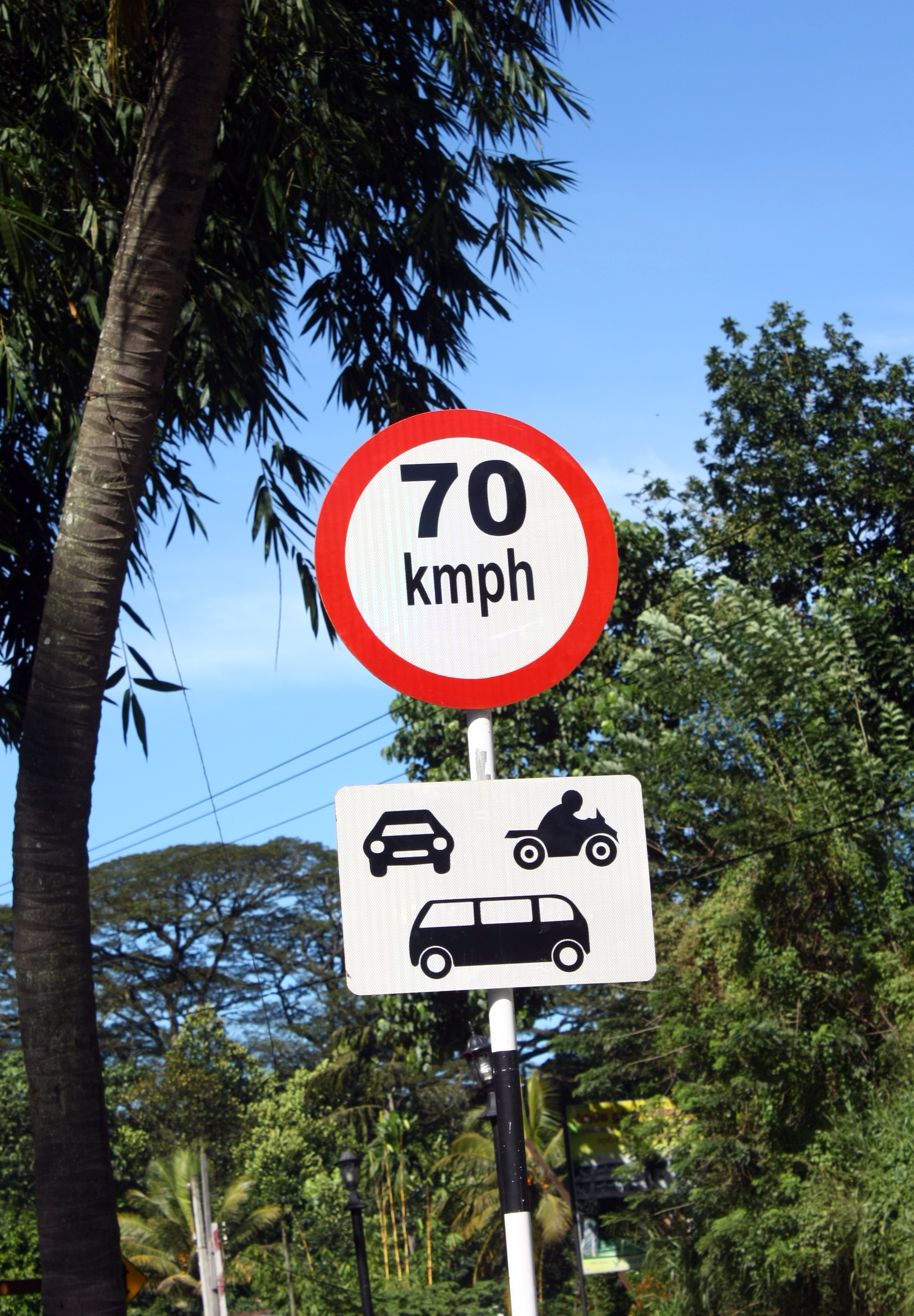
70 km/h speed limit for light vehicles outside built-up areas. Vehicle categories are motor cars, dual-purpose vehicles and motorcycles

Road signs in Sri Lanka are legally prescribed in the Motor Traffic Act (Chapter 203). They are also laid out in a supplementary guide, the Manual on Traffic Control Devices, published by the Ministry of Transport and Highways and the Road Development Authority.

Sri Lankan road signs display text in Sinhala, Tamil and English.

== Warning signs ==
Curve to the left

Curve to the right

Double curve, first to the left

Double curve, first to the right

Hairpin curve to the left

Hairpin curve to the right

Dual Carriageway ends

Dual Carriageway starts

Road narrows

Road narrows on the left

Road narrows on the right

Crossroads

Staggered junctions

Staggered junctions

T-junction

Y-junction

Merging traffic from the left

Joining a side road at right angles to the left

Merging traffic from the right

Joining a side road at right angles to the right

Narrow bridge

Two-way traffic ahead

Stop sign ahead

Give way sign ahead

Roundabout ahead

Traffic lights ahead

Steep descent

Steep ascent

Slippery road

Loose gravel

Falling rocks

Pedestrian crossing ahead

Children

Blind pedestrians crossing

Roadworks

Level crossing with barriers ahead

Level crossing without barriers ahead

Bus lane ahead

Cycle lane ahead

Cyclists

Domestic animals

Quayside or riverbank

Dangerous cliff

Uneven road

Bump ahead

Dip

Hump bridge

Tunnel

Low-flying aircraft

== Regulatory signs ==
=== Prohibitory signs ===
No entry

No left turn

No right turn

No U-turn

No overtaking

End of overtaking prohibition

No overtaking by trucks

End of overtaking prohibition by trucks

No horns

All vehicles prohibited

No motor vehicles

No buses

No trucks

No trailers

No tractors

No hand tractors

No three-wheeled vehicles

No motorcycles

No bicycles

No animal-drawn vehicles

No handcarts

No pedestrians

No parking

No parking and standing

No parking on odd-numbered days

No parking on even-numbered days

=== Restrictive signs ===
Width limit

Height Limit

Weight Limit

Weight Limit on One Axle

Maximum speed limit (for vehicles within built-up areas except for 3 wheelers and land vehicles)

Maximum speed limit (light vehicles outside built-up areas)

Maximum speed limit (heavy vehicles in non built-up areas)

Maximum speed limit (3 wheelers and land vehicles in built-up and non built-up areas)

Maximum speed limit (all vehicles within school areas and hospitals)

Maximum speed limit ends

=== Mandatory signs ===
Proceed straight

Turn left ahead

Turn right ahead

Turn left

Turn right

Pass onto left

Pass onto right

Roundabout

=== Priority signs ===
Stop

Give way (without inscription)

Give way (with inscription)

Priority road

End of priority road

Priority to oncoming traffic

Priority over oncoming traffic

=== Additional panels ===
Additional panels to be used with regulatory signs

School (supplementing a regulatory sign)

5.00 am - 9.00 pm (supplementing a regulatory sign)

To be affixed to signs PHS-1, PHS-2 or PHS-3 at the entry to an expressway

== Directional informative signs ==
=== National highways ===
Beginning of an administrative area

Confirming distances

=== Provincial roads ===
Direction sign

=== Expressways ===
Exit ramp

=== Other signs useful for drivers ===
Pedestrian crossing

One-way street

Hospital

Parking

Parking for disabled persons

Bus stop

Bus lane

End of bus lane

Expressway

End of expressway

Telephone

Information

Industrial zone

Restaurant

Light refreshment

Hotel or motel

Petrol station

Breakdown service

== Road markings ==
Overtaking line

Warning line

Pedestrian crossing

Cycle crossing

== Traffic light signals ==
Red traffic light

Red & yellow traffic light

Green traffic light

Yellow traffic light

=== Light signals for pedestrians ===
Light signals for pedestrians

== See also ==
- Transport in Sri Lanka
