= Sri Lanka Transport Board =

State-owned bus service provider in Sri Lanka

Sri Lanka Transport Board (SLTB)
- SLTB Logo

- Flag of SLTB
- Formerly: Ceylon Transport Board (CTB)
- Founded: 1 January 1958; 68 years ago, as Ceylon Transport Board
- Headquarters: Narahenpita, Colombo, Sri Lanka
- Service area: Sri Lanka
- Service type: Public transport
- Hubs: Central Bus Stand, Pettah, Colombo
- Fleet: 6,178 (2016)

The Sri Lanka Transport Board (Sinhalese: ශ්‍රී ලංකා ගමනාගමන මණ්ඩලය Sri Lanka Gamanágamana Mandalé, Tamil: இலங்கை போக்குவரத்து சபை Ilaṅkai Pōkkuvarattu Capai), abberviated as SLTB, is a bus service provider in Sri Lanka.

Between 1958 and 1978, the Ceylon Transport Board (CTB) was the nationalised enterprise which handled all public bus transport in Sri Lanka. At its peak, it was the largest omnibus company in the world — with about 7,000 buses and over 50,000 employees. With privatization in 1979, it underwent a period of decline.

First broken up into several regional boards, then into several companies, it was finally reconstituted as the Sri Lanka Transport Board in 2005.

In 2016, the number of buses in the fleet was 7769, of which 6178 were in operation. In the same year, SLTB had a total of 32,640 employees.

== History ==
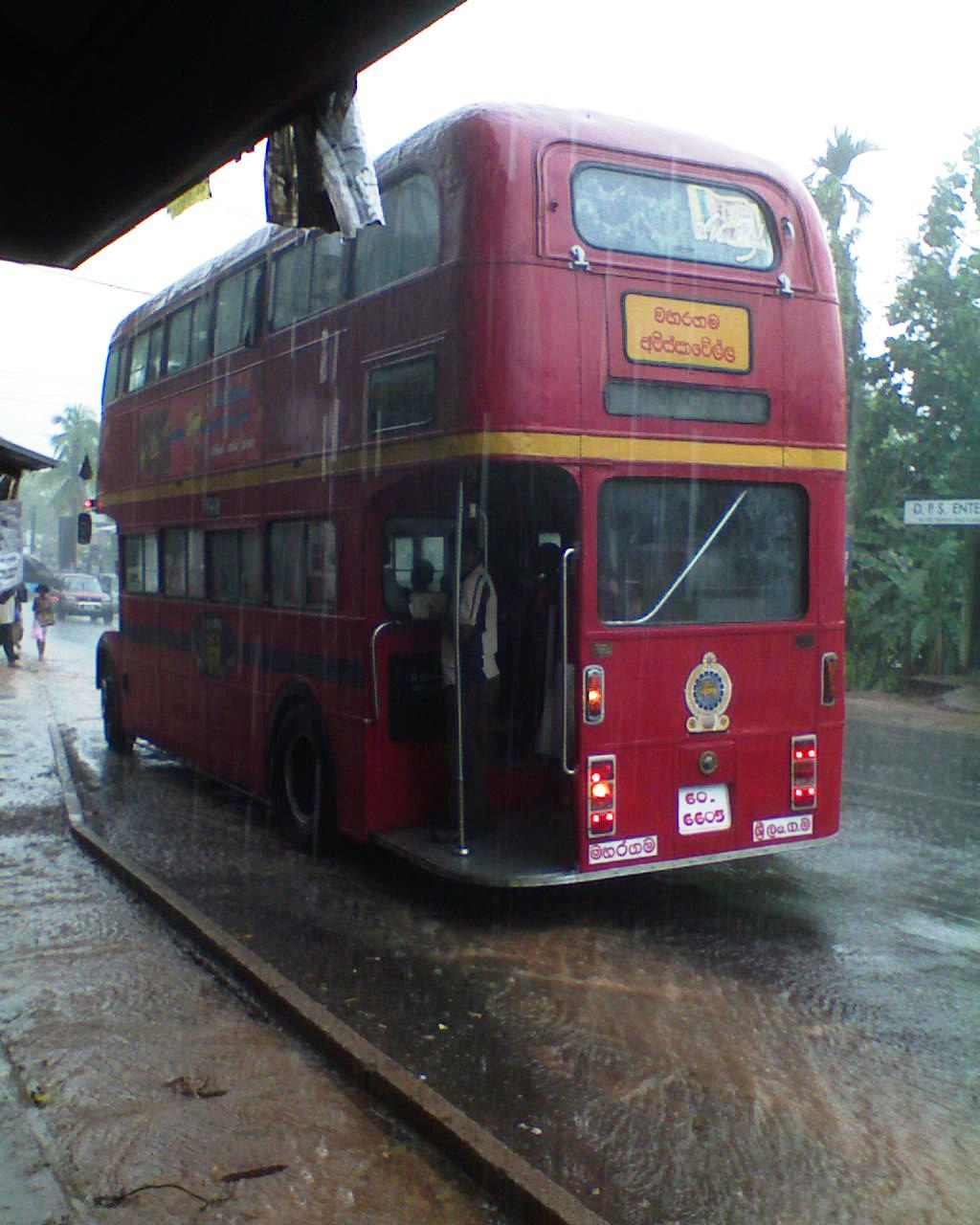
An AEC Routemaster at Godagama junction in Homagama

The first motor omnibus in Sri Lanka was imported in 1907 and bus transport began in Sri Lanka as an owner-operated service. There was no regulation, so when more than one bus operated on a single route, there was a scramble for the load. By the mid-1930s, malpractices in pursuit of maximum profit began to compromise safety and comfort. The setting up of the limited liability omnibus companies by the British around 1940 was the first meaningful step in regularising public passenger transport in the country.

The Ratnam Survey in 1948, the Sansoni Survey in 1954 and the Jayaratna Perera Survey in 1956 studied the bus services in Sri Lanka and all recommended that the companies should be nationalised.

The history of Sri Lanka Transport Board goes back to 1 January 1958; at the time known as the Ceylon Transport Board (CTB). The inaugural trip of the CTB took the Prime Minister and the Transport and Works Minister Maithripala Senanayake on a maroon luxury Mercedes-Benz bus imported from Germany. The bus is still owned by the Nittambuwa Bus Depot.

At its peak, it was the largest omnibus company in the world — with about 7,000 buses and over 50,000 employees. With privatization in 1979, it underwent a period of decline. The creation of a single nationalised entity made possible long-distance operations and running buses on a large number of rural routes.

First broken up into several regional boards, then into several companies, it was finally reconstituted as the Sri Lanka Transport Board in 2005. The move received bipartisan support in Parliament. It was hailed by the Joint Business Forum (J-Biz), which welcomed the revival of the CTB: this was one of the rare occasions on which the business community said a state bus service was better than privatised ventures.

== Services ==
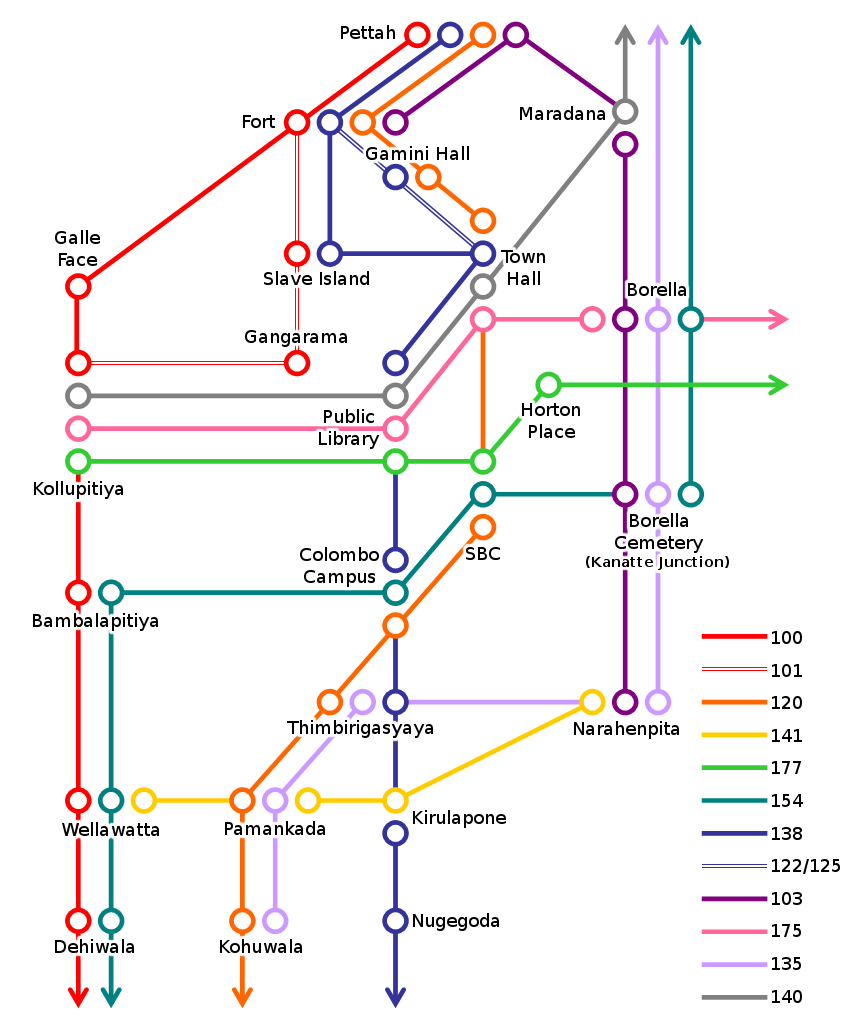
A topological map of bus routes in Colombo, many of which are operated by SLTB

SLTB serves both urban and rural routes. In many rural areas, it provides services in unprofitable areas that would be unattractive to private operators.

=== Urban routes ===
Colombo has an extensive public transport system based on buses, some of which is operated by SLTB. The Central Bus Stand in Pettah functions as the primary hub for bus transport in Colombo.

The road network in Colombo consists of radial links (or arterial routes), which link the city centre and district centres, and orbital links, which intersect the arterial routes; most bus routes run along the radial links without the benefit of dedicated bus lanes owing to the high volume of traffic at peak times. The newly introduced Lanka Metro Transit is a bus rapid transit service introduced in the capital's metropolitan region in April 2026 in order to provide transportation under the 'Clean Sri Lanka' program and operated as a subsidiary of the SLTB. The system is part of wider efforts to reduce traffic congestion and encourage a shift from private to public transport in Colombo.

=== Intercity routes ===
SLTB also serves many intercity routes. As of January 2012, SLTB is the only bus operator on the Southern Expressway. It uses modern Lanka Ashok Leyland buses on the expressway to connect Galle with Maharagama every two hours. As of 2013, the SLTB has started operating on the Katunayake Expressway providing access for people from Negombo, Katunayake, Puttalam, etc.

These intercity routes can be classified into two main categories:

Inter-provincial services

Inter-provincial services are mainly concentrated in the commercial capital of Colombo. Secondly, it is mostly active in Kandy, Kurunegala and other district cities. In addition, more inter-provincial services are concentrated in several other suburbs such as Panadura, Kataragama and Maharagama.

Inter-provincial bus services often start in one city and extend to another urban or rural destination. Most inter-provincial services are Over 100 km intercity or rural long-distance services. However, inter-provincial services are also available along suburban and rural provincial boundaries with shorter destinations. 100 km More than inter-provincial general services often run as limited stops. The SLTB has the longest inter-provincial service in Kataragama - Jaffna. The Kataragama (administrative boundary belongs to the Uva Province) depot in the Southern Province can also be pointed out as the only SLTB depot covering all the provinces of Sri Lanka.

Intra-provincial services

The commercial capital of Colombo is mainly centered on the internal services of the Western Province. These include urban services that extend to other cities within the Colombo District, as well as medium-distance intercity services to other urban (rural) destinations in the province (Kalutara, Gampaha). Internal provincial services with the longest routes operate in the Eastern and the Northern Provinces. Internal provincial long-distance services also operate as limited stops.

== Fleet ==
Most of the fleet consists of buses from Ashok Leyland, Dennis, Volvo, Yutong, Tata Motors, Mitsubishi and Isuzu. As of 2011, SLTB is expanding its fleet, by ordering new buses from Volvo with a low-floor design and air-conditioning. In July 2011, trial runs began in Colombo to gauge passengers' response to the new buses.

=== Livery ===
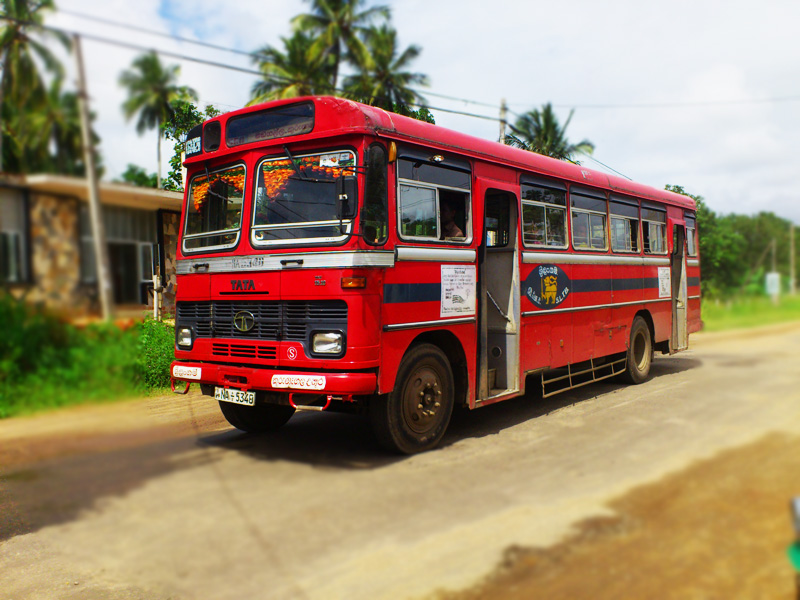
SLTB buses are red

Most SLTB buses have a red livery and are easily recognisable.

==== Past liveries ====
The CTB originally painted its buses red and blue. The second-hand London Transport buses, which were the backbone of the fleet, just needed to be half-painted in blue, saving money. When aluminium bus bodies became the norm, large areas of the surface were left unpainted, with just red front and back and blue strips down the side, in order to further save money.

==== Logo ====
Present SLTB logo

The Logo was originally a blue oval with CTB and its equivalents in Sinhala and Tamil painted on it in red. From 1970 this was replaced by an oval with a lion rampant or on field azure.

The present SLTB logo is the same, except has 'SLTB' instead of 'CTB' in Roman lettering, with 'Sri' added to the Sinhala script and no change in the Tamil script.

== Transit Competitors ==
SLTB buses compete with private buses throughout the country, as well as with rail services by Sri Lanka Railways.

=== Integration issues ===
Sri Lanka Transport Board has not integrated its services with other modes of transport. Unlike transport systems in some other countries, Sri Lanka does not have a streamlined ticket system between road and rail transport. There are no dedicated feeder-bus services to the railways, resulting in commuter rail and buses acting as isolated systems in relation to each other, which creates a loss in efficiency.

== See also ==
- Transport in Sri Lanka
- Nationalisation in Sri Lanka
