= Mohammed Al Rumhi =

Omani politician

Mohammed bin Hamad Al Rumhi

Minister of Energy and Minerals
- In office December 16, 1997 – 2022
- Monarchs: Qaboos bin Said; Haitham bin Tariq
- Prime Minister: Qaboos bin Said; Haitham bin Tariq
- Succeeded by: Salim bin Nasir bin Said Al Aufi

Dr Mohammed bin Hamad Al Rumhi was the Minister of Energy and Minerals in the Sultanate of Oman and the Chairman of the Board of Directors of Petroleum Development Oman. He has been the Minister of Energy and Minerals from December 16, 1997 till 2022, which is evidence of how highly regarded and respected he is in his role.
