= Farmout agreement =

Agreement in the oil and gas industry

In the oil and gas industry, a farmout agreement is an agreement entered into by the owner of one or more mineral leases, called the "farmor", and another company who wishes to obtain a percentage of ownership of that lease or leases in exchange for providing services, called the "farmee." The typical service described in farmout agreements is the drilling of one or more oil and/or gas wells. A farmout agreement differs from a conventional transaction between two oil and gas lessees, because the primary consideration is the rendering of services, rather than the simple exchange of money.

Farmout agreements typically provide that the farmor will assign the defined quantum of interest in the lease(s) to the farmee upon the farmee finishing: (1) the drilling of an oil and/or gas well to the defined depth or formation, or (2) drilling of an oil and/or gas well and the obtaining of commercially viable production levels. Farmout Agreements are the second most commonly negotiated agreements in the oil and gas industry, behind the oil and gas lease. For the farmor, the reasons for entering into a farmout agreement include obtaining production, sharing risk, and obtaining geological information. Farmees often enter into farmout agreements to obtain an acreage position, or because they need to use underutilized personnel or share risks, or because they desire to obtain geological information.

A farmout agreement differs from its sister agreement, the purchase and sale agreement (PSA), in that the PSA addresses an exchange of money or debt for immediate transfer of assets, whereas the farmout agreement addresses an exchange of services for a transfer of assets. Further, the transfer often occurs on a later date, such as the date when the 'earning barrier' has been met.
