= Salim Al Aufi =

Omani politician

Salim bin Nasser bin Said Al Aufi
- سالم بن ناصر بن سعيد العوفي
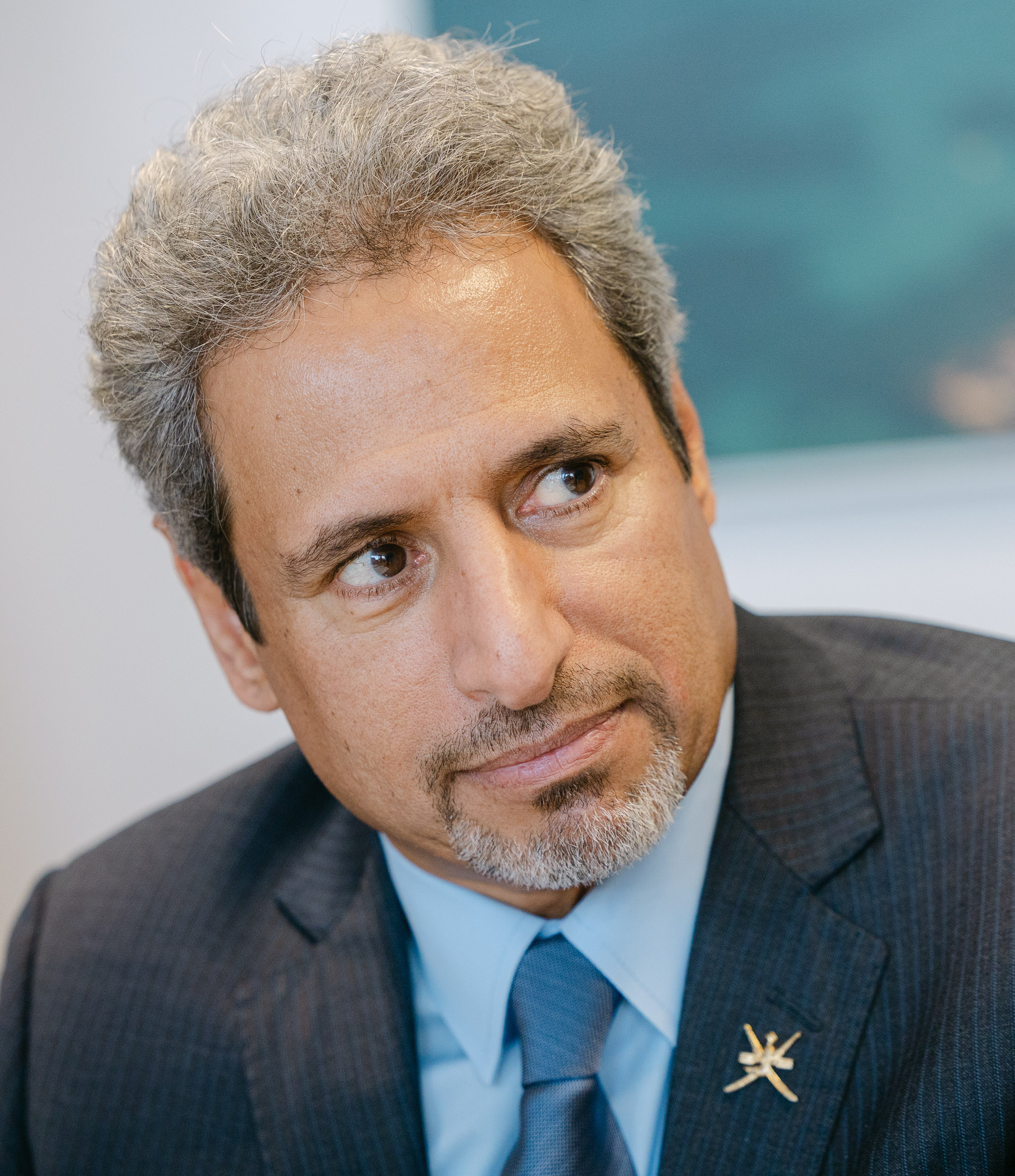
- Al Aufi in 2025

Minister of Energy and Minerals
- Incumbent
- Assumed office 16 June 2022
- Monarch: Haitham bin Tariq
- Prime Minister: Haitham bin Tariq
- Preceded by: Mohammed Al Rumhi

Personal details
- Education: Heriot-Watt University (M.Sc.)

Salim bin Nasser bin Said Al Aufi (Arabic: سالم بن ناصر بن سعيد العوفي) is the Omani Minister of Energy and Minerals. He was appointed as Minister on 16 June 2022.

== Education ==
Al Aufi holds a master’s degree in Petroleum Engineering from Heriot-Watt University.

== Career ==
In 2010, Al Aufi was appointed Director of North Oman at Petroleum Development Oman (PDO), where he had been working since 1992.

Al Aufi was appointed CEO of the Public Authority for Civial Aviation (PACA) in 2012.

In 2013, Al Aufi was appointed Undersecretary of the Ministry of Oil and Gas.

In 2020, he became Undersecretary of the Ministry of Energy and Minerals.

Al Aufi is the Chairman of the Board of Directors of Petroleum Development Oman.

Since 16 June 2022, Al Aufi has been Minister of Energy and Minerals.
