= Gampaha, Uva =

Town in Uva, Sri Lanka

Coordinates: 06°43′00″N 81°02′00″E

Gampaha is a town in Uva province, Sri Lanka.

== Transport ==
The nearest railway station is at Bandarawela on the branch railway to Badulla.

== See also ==
- Transport in Sri Lanka
