= Ministry of Petroleum Resources Development =

Government ministry of Sri Lanka

Ministry of Energy
- බලශක්ති අමාත්‍යාංශය பெற்றோலிய வள அபிவிருத்தி அமைச்சு

Ministry overview
- Formed: April 30, 2010; 16 years ago (as Ministry of Petroleum Industries)
- Jurisdiction: Democratic Socialist Republic of Sri Lanka
- Headquarters: 80 Sir Ernest De Silva Mawatha, Colombo 07; 6.906293°N 79.858462°E
- Minister responsible: Udaya Gammanpila, Minister of Energy
- Ministry executive: KDR Olga, Ministry Secretary
- Child agencies: Ceylon Petroleum Corporation; Ceylon Petroleum Storage Terminals Limited; Petroleum Resources Development Secretariat; Polypto Lanka
- Website: petroleummin.gov.lk

The Ministry of Energy (Sinhala: බලශක්ති අමාත්‍යාංශය Balashakthi Amathyanshaya; Tamil: பெற்றோலிய வள அபிவிருத்தி அமைச்சு) is the cabinet ministry of the Government of Sri Lanka responsible for oversight of the country's energy supply via crude oil import, storage and refining (carried out at the nation's sole refinery at Sapugaskanda), as well as sale (through the Ceylon Petroleum Corporation) of processed petroleum products. It is thus responsible for the maintenance of (and upgrades to) petroleum and petroleum product storage and transport facilities as well as for developing the country's natural gas and crude oil reserves.

In 2020 the minister was Udaya Gammanpila. The ministry's secretary is KDR Olga.

Minister of Energy
- Incumbent; Udaya Gammanpila since 12 August 2020
- Appointer: Gotabaya Rajapaksa
- Website: petroleummin.gov.lk
