= Central Bus Stand, Pettah =

Central Bus station in Colombo, Sri Lanka

Central Bus Stand මධ්‍යම බස් නැවතුම්පොළ

General information
- Location: Olcott Mawatha, Pettah, Colombo 11; Sri Lanka
- System: Bus station
- Owner: Sri Lanka Transport Board
- Operator: Sri Lanka Transport Board
- Platforms: Multiple

History
- Opened: 1964
- Rebuilt: 2026

The Central Bus Stand (CBS) is the main long-distance bus station in Colombo, Sri Lanka. Located in Pettah, it is owned and run by the Sri Lanka Transport Board (SLTB). It connects Colombo to all nine provinces of the country.

== History ==
The station opened in 1964 to bring all of the city's different bus services together in one place.

=== Bombing in 1987 ===
On 21 April 1987, during the Sri Lankan Civil War, a car bomb exploded at the station. The attack killed over 113 people and injured many others.

=== Renovations in 2025–26 ===
On 15 September 2025, President Anura Kumara Dissanayake started a major renovation project as part of the "Clean Sri Lanka" programme. The upgrade cost around Rs. 550 million and was carried out by the Sri Lanka Air Force. The project modernized the old buildings and improved facilities for passengers. The station reopened on 8 April 2026.

== Facilities ==
The station has two main buildings:

- First Building: The ground floor handles bus arrivals and departures. The first floor has rest areas for drivers and conductors. The second floor holds administrative offices, a conference hall, and storage rooms.
- Second Building: The ground floor has shops. The first floor has public toilets and waiting areas. The second floor includes separate rest areas for visiting schoolboys and schoolgirls. It also has an information center for bus, train, and flight updates.

== Operations ==
The station is open 24 hours a day and mainly runs state-owned (SLTB) buses. Private long-distance buses use the nearby Bastian Mawatha Bus Station. The station operates standard routes, as well as student services ("Sisu Seriya"), rural services ("Gemi Seriya"), and night services ("Nisi Sariya").

Main routes from the station include:

- Northern Route: Jaffna, Vavuniya, and Kilinochchi.
- Central Route: Kandy, Nuwara Eliya, and Badulla.
- Southern Route: Galle, Matara, and Kataragama.
- Eastern Route: Trincomalee, Batticaloa, and Ampara.

== Connectivity ==
The station is on Olcott Mawatha, right next to the Colombo Fort Railway Station, making it easy to change between trains and buses. It is also close to the Gunasinghepura and Bastian Mawatha bus terminals for private bus transfers.
