= Sapugaskanda Power Station =

Power station in Gampaha District, Sri Lanka

- Country: Sri Lanka
- Location: Sapugaskanda
- Coordinates: 6°57′40″N 79°57′39″E
- Status: Operational
- Commission date: May 1984
- Owner: EGL

Thermal power station
- Primary fuel: Heavy fuel oil

Power generation
- Units operational: 8 × 10 MW; 4 × 20 MW
- Make and model: Alstom (4); SAG (8)
- Nameplate capacity: 160 MW

The Sapugaskanda Power Station is a 160-megawatt base load thermal power station located in Heiyanthuduwa, adjacent to the Sapugaskanda Refinery, in the Western Province of Sri Lanka. Originally built and operated by the CEB, the facility was transferred to the state-owned EGL following the unbundling of the national power sector in 2026.

== History ==
The power station was established to provide grid stabilization and intermediate generation capacity for the Colombo metropolitan area. Due to its proximity to the country's main oil refinery, it was strategically positioned to easily procure fuel. The facility was developed in multiple phases, beginning with the commissioning of "Station A" in 1984, followed by two major expansions forming "Station B" in the late 1990s.

On 9 March 2026, following the enactment of the Sri Lanka Electricity Act No. 36 of 2024, the CEB was dissolved. The ownership, assets, and operational responsibilities of the Sapugaskanda Power Station were officially transferred to the newly incorporated generation entity, Electricity Generation Lanka.

== Infrastructure and specifications ==
The facility has a total installed capacity of 160 MW and is structurally divided into two primary generating divisions: Station A and Station B.

=== Station A ===
Commissioned between May and October 1984, Station A has a total capacity of 80 MW. It is equipped with four V-type 20 MW PC 4.2 diesel engines manufactured by SEMT Pielstick. Each of these engines is coupled with a 25.6 MVA generator manufactured by Alsthom Atlantique. To manage engine temperatures, Station A utilizes a dedicated cooling tower.

=== Station B ===
Station B also has a total capacity of 80 MW, comprising eight 10MW diesel engines (model 8L 58/64) manufactured by MAN B&W. Each engine is coupled with a 12.9MVA generator manufactured by Siemens. Unlike Station A, Station B utilizes a radiator bank for its cooling water system.

The development of Station B was executed in two phases:

- Station B1: Consists of four 10 MW units, commissioned in September 1997.
- Station B2: Consists of an additional four 10 MW units, commissioned in October 1999.

== Operations ==
The power station relies primarily on HFO for steady power generation. Standard diesel fuel is utilized for the startup and shutdown procedures of the engines. The fuel is delivered directly from the adjacent Sapugaskanda Oil Refinery and stored in the power station's tank farm.

To maintain the correct viscosity of the heavy fuel oil, exhaust gases from the engines are captured and used to produce hot water, which subsequently heats the HFO prior to combustion. Both fuel and lubricating oils are purified on-site using Alfa Laval centrifuges.

The generators in both stations produce electricity at 11 kV. This voltage is stepped up to 132 kV through five step-up transformers. The power is then exported to the national grid via two 132 kV overhead transmission lines, which connect to the nearby Heiyanthuduwa Substation.

== See also ==
- List of power stations in Sri Lanka
- Electricity sector in Sri Lanka
