= Purchase and sale agreement =

Type of contract

A purchase and sale agreement (PSA), also called a sales and purchase agreement (SPA) or an agreement for purchase and sale (APS), is an agreement between a buyer and a seller of real estate property, company stock, or other assets.

The person, company, or other legal entity acquiring, receiving, and purchasing the property, stock, or other assets is typically referred to as the buyer. The entity disposing, conveying, and selling the assets is referred to as the seller or vendor. A PSA sets out the various rights and obligations of both the buyer and seller, and might also require other documents be executed and recorded in the public records, such as an assignment, deed of trust, or farmout agreement.

In the oil and natural gas industries, a PSA is the primary legal contract by which companies exchange oil and gas assets (including stock in an oil and gas business entity) for cash, debt, stock, or other assets.
