= Ministry of Energy and Minerals (Oman) =

Coordinates: 23°35′54″N 58°25′31″E

Sultanate of Oman Ministry of Energy & Minerals
- وزارة الطاقة و المعادن
- National emblem of Oman

Agency overview
- Jurisdiction: Government of Oman
- Headquarters: Muscat (Oman)
- Agency executive: Salim bin Nasir bin Said Al Aufi, Minister
- Child agency: Oman Gas Company
- Website: Official website

The Ministry of Energy and Minerals (MEM) is the governmental body in the Sultanate of Oman responsible for developing and implementing the government policy for exploiting the oil and gas resources in Oman.

The current Minister of Energy and Minerals is Salim bin Nasser bin Said Al Aufi.

== History ==
MOG was originally established as the Ministry of Oil and Minerals and was renamed in the year 1997 as the Ministry of Oil and Gas. On 18 August 2020, it was renamed the Ministry of Energy and Minerals.

== Function ==
The competences of MOE are as follows:

1. Drawing and implementing studies, plans, and policies for ensuring the optimum exploitation of oil and gas wealths.
2. Managing and supervising the surveys necessary for the oil and gas resources and managing and supervising the economic studies necessary for any project relating to their exploitation.
3. Supervising all the activities relating to the exploration, excavation, and production of oil and gas by concession holding companies.
4. Studying international oil and gas markets to develop marketing policies for the production of oil and gas.
5. Concluding agreements with specialized companies and supervising the implementation of these agreements.
6. Safeguarding the interests of the Sultanate when dealing with companies working in the field of oil and gas production and ensuring that these companies abide by Omani laws.
7. Managing and supervising government investment in the Sultanate in the fields of oil and gas.
8. Preparing draft laws and regulations necessary for the fields of oil and gas.
9. Representing the Sultanate at international venues relating to oil and gas.
10. Training its staff to undertake the responsibilities of the ministry.
11. Implementation of the Joint Supplier Registration System (JSRS) to validate & certify all Suppliers to the 23 Omani Oil & Gas Operators in the country.

== Structure ==
The MOE has nine General Directorates:

1. The Directorate General of Planning and Studies (Reports directly to the Minister of Energy and Minerals)
2. The Directorate General of Exploration and Production of Oil and Gas
3. The Directorate General of Petroleum Industries
4. The Directorate General of Minerals
5. The Directorate General of Electricity
6. The Directorate General of Renewable Energy and Hydrogen
7. The Directorate General of Petroleum Investment Management
8. The Directorate General of Oil and Gas Marketing
9. The Directorate General of Administrative and Financial Affairs

== Former Senior Officers ==
- Said bin Ahmed Al Shanfari - appointed Minister of Agriculture, Fishers, Oil, and Minerals in the year 1974.
