= Peliyagoda =

Peliyagoda පෑලියගොඩ பேலியகொடை
- town
- Location in Sri Lanka
- Coordinates: 6°57′N 79°54′E
- Country: Sri Lanka
- Province: Western Province
- Time zone: +5.30

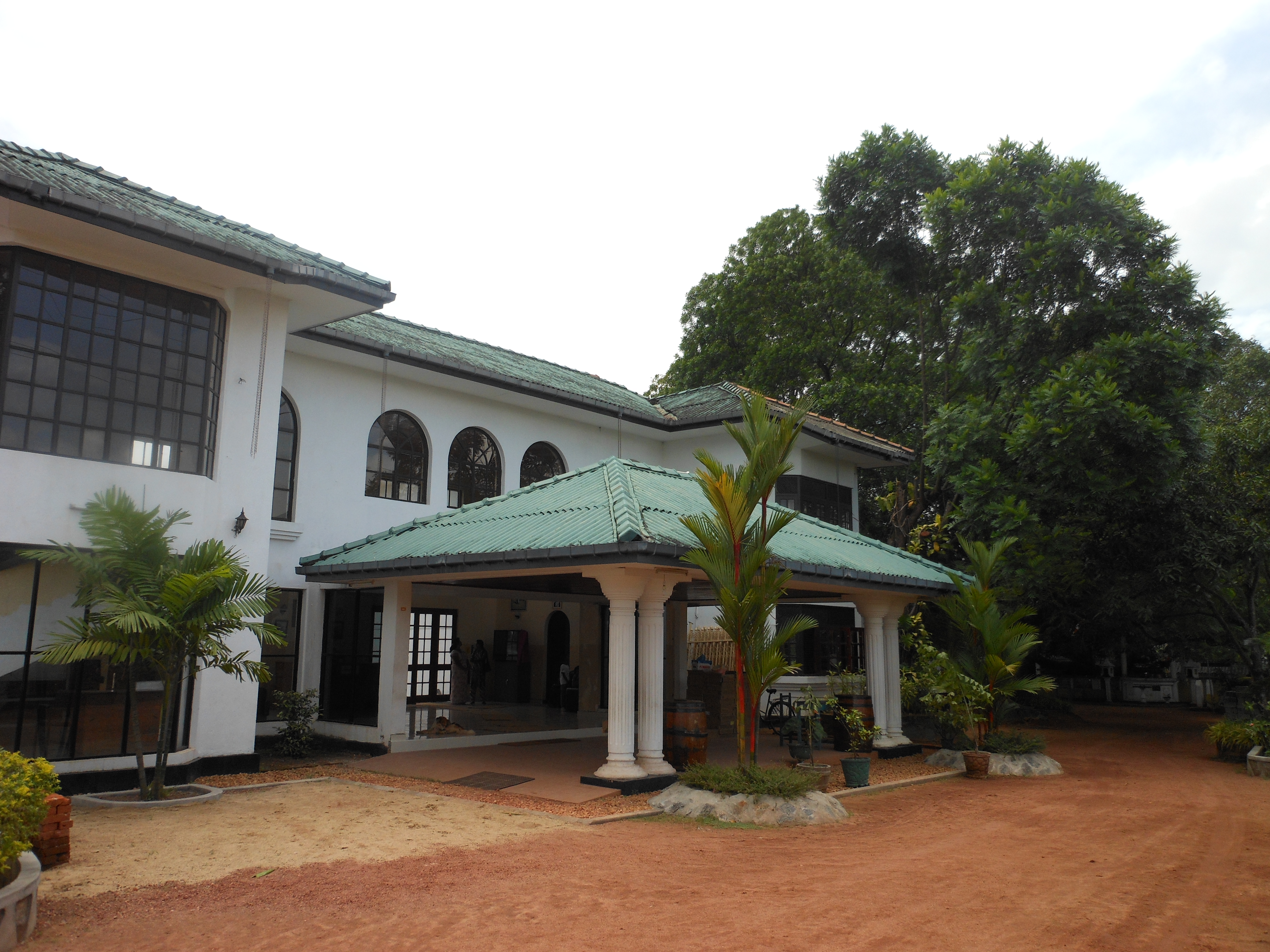
Yoshida School in Sapugaskanda/Peliyagoda

Peliyagoda is a town in the Western Province of Sri Lanka, lying mostly on the north shore of the Kelani River. As of 2020 it had an estimated population of 28,784. The Airport Expressway's entry point and the Toll Plaza starts from the Peliyagoda section of the highway.
