= Ceylon Petroleum Corporation =

Sri Lankan government owned oil company

- Type: Government-owned corporation
- Industry: Oil and gas
- Founded: 1962; 64 years ago
- Headquarters: CEYPETCO House, 609 Dr Danister De Silva mawatha, Colombo 9, Sri Lanka
- Number of locations: ▲1,302 (2019)
- Area served: Sri Lanka
- Key people: Mohamed Uvais Mohamed (Chairman)
- Products: Petroleum; Natural gas Motor fuel Aviation fuel Petrochemical; Lubricate
- Production output: ▲280,000 bbl/d (2021)
- Revenue: ▲ Rs 929.197 billion (2024)
- Operating income: ▲ Rs 21.159billion (2024)
- Net income: ▲ Rs 36.610 billion (2024)
- Total assets: ▼ Rs 279.745 billion (2024)
- Total equity: ▲ Rs 111.546 billion (2024)
- Owner: Government of Sri Lanka
- Number of employees: ▼2,616 (2019)
- Parent: Ministry of Petroleum Resources Development
- Subsidiaries: Litro Gas
- Website: ceypetco.gov.lk

Ceylon Petroleum Corporation, commonly known as CEYPETCO (CPC), is a Sri Lankan oil and gas company. Established in 1962 and wholly owned by the Government of Sri Lanka, it is the largest oil company in Sri Lanka. It was formed in 1961 by nationalisation and expropriation of all private oil companies in Sri Lanka at the time of its formation. It is under the ownership of Ministry of Petroleum Resources Development headquartered in Colombo. It is the largest government owned company in the country, with an operational profit of Rs. 33.9 billion for the financial year 2020.

CPC provides a substantial source of income for the Sri Lanka government, with 30% of the government's budget dependent on the company's dividend. In December 2018, CPC became Sri Lanka's most loss government corporation of the second consecutive years, with a record loss of Rs. 326 billion at the end of 2018.

== History ==
Even after independence in 1948, policy towards the country's petroleum and gas industry had remained unchanged until the end of the 1950s. The Ceylon Petroleum Corporation was created with the Ceylon Petroleum Corporation Act of May 29, 1961. Subsequent legislative acts in 1962, 1963 and 1964 expropriated the properties belonging to Shell, Esso and Caltex in the country, and gave the Ceylon Petroleum Corporation the exclusive right to import, sell, export or distribute most petroleum products in Sri Lanka.

In 1961, Prime Minister Sirimavo Bandaranaike (1960–65) launched in Act. No. 28 of 1961 to bypass the monopolistic pricing imposed on OPEC oil imports, allowing Sri Lanka to import oil from the UAE and the former Soviet Russia. After establishing CPC Bandaranaike nationalised the Anglo–Dutch operating companies (Shell and BP).

In 1968, the company built a new refinery, increasing production to 38,000 BPD.

From 1969, it became possible for foreign petroleum companies to do business in Sri Lanka within a partnership with National Iranian Oil Company. Sapugaskanda Refinery was built by Iran under the guidance of the CPC in August 1969 Sapugaskanda establishment of JET A1 producing unit in the late 1980s. It is the single largest oil refinery of Sri Lanka.

In the mid-1970s, the company began to sell LPG cylinders to homes in Colombo and further expanded its delivery network.

CPC accounts for more than half of Sri Lanka's petroleum products market share, 60% national refining capacity. CPC own and operate single refineries with a combined refining capacity of 50,000 barrels (7,900 m^{3}) per stream day.

Since the 1970s, CPC being the monopoly operator in the national market was able to enlarge the portfolio of its operation; importation of crude oil and refined oil, storage and distribution and retail trade. Besides, many products were added to the distribution and retail trade by CEYPETCO: agrochemicals, chemical fertiliser, LPG, Naphtha, synthetic fiber. With the refinery operation, bitumen for road construction was partly supplied by CPC. Further, the sale of lubricating oil and bunkering oil for sea vessels was found to be increasingly profitable for CPC by the late 1970s.

Between 1977 and 1994 the country came under UNP rule in which under President J.R Jayawardana Sri Lanka began to shift away from a socialist orientation in 1977. Since then, the government has been deregulating, privatizing, and opening the economy to international competition. Post-1977, private sector activity in lubricant, synthetic fiber and bunkering oil subsectors was allowed under privatisation on an initiative taken in the early 1980s. In addition, the operation of LPG importation and distribution was also allowed later in which retail sales have been undertaken by entities outside CEYPETCO. In late 1996 Shell purchased a 51 per cent stake in the CPC's LPG division for US$37 million. Ten years after government brought back majority stake for US$63 million as a part of its wider policy of President Mahinda Rajapaksa’s re-nationalization.

In 1978, the company expanded its business into manufacture of Nylon 6 yarn for textile, tires and fishing industries. In1979, capacity of the Refinery increased to 50,000 BPD by increasing the crude distiller capacity.

On October 20, 1995, suicide cadres of the LTTE attacked the oil storage complexes at Kolonnawa and Orugodawatta. They managed to blow themselves up destroying the tanks. 22 security personnel died during this attack, and petroleum oil worth over US$10 million was destroyed.

In 2003 to bring in another participant into the petroleum industry's key products market with a view to increase competition. Accordingly, the Lanka Indian Oil Company (LIOC) was set up and allowed importation and retail distribution of key petroleum products: diesel, petrol and bitumen.

CPC's has been providing electricity-generating entities with relevant categories of oil for electricity generation for decades. Electricity generation on oil occupies an increasing proportion since the 1990s, as the increase of demand for electricity has to be met from the thermal power. Ceylon Electricity Board (CEB) has a debt of up to Rs. 500 billion due to be paid to CPC.

In the wake of the Sri Lankan energy crisis power and energy minister decided to break the existing fuel market duopoly enjoyed by the company, which controlled 80% and by the Lanka Indian Oil Company controlling the rest 20%. As a result in March 2023 three corporations were allowed to enter Sti Lanka: United Petroleum, Sinopec, and RM Parks in a collaboration with Shell.

== Finances ==
CPC financial performance

Year	Revenue (mil. LKR)	Net income (mil. LKR)	Total assets (mil. LKR)	Employees
2005	161,851	7,710	69,106	2,866
2006	196,766	−1,721	74,233	2,930
2007	238,364	2,862	97,873	2,931
2008	341,670	−14,952	120,631	2,832
2009	237,662	−11,566	147,144	2,792
2010	256,329	−26,922	153,223	2,744
2011	356,442	−94,508	187,127	2,610
2012	512,910	−97,308	206,231	2,658
2013	518,152	−7,984	187,035	2,657
2014	558,324	1,741	182,550	2,668
2015	376,734	−21,735	199,107	2,579
2016	423,061	53,027	190,989	2,577
2017	446,502	1,469	218,701	2,573
2018	520,967	−105,050	329,271	2,461
2019	630,859	−11,856	326,340	2,366

== Financial fallout ==
Ceylon Petroleum was Sri Lanka's largest company by revenue. But now the company is reporting loss in several million rupees. In April 2020 Ceylon Petroleum Corporation lost Rs. 45.1 billion first quarter. Company total debt rising 1,158.7 billion.

Import expenditure on petroleum in 2021 was US$3.9 billion against US$1.7 billion in 2019. They represented 25 per cent and 20 per cent of the total import expenditure in the respective years. This is not different from the ratio that existed in the late 1970s which was around 25 per cent of the value of total imports. On November 14, 2021, Sri Lanka Government shut down the Sapugaskanda oil refinery because the paucity of dollars to import crude oil. The Sapugaskanda is 51 years old and it produces 37 per cent of Kerosene (Furnace oil), Naptha 19 per cent Jet fuel and 43 per cent Petrol and Diesel. Government received a US$1 billion loan from Central Bank of Qatar to buy fuel and boost foreign reserves, which dropped to US$2.27 billion at the end of October 2021. During the first nine months of 2021, CPC spends US$692 million on fuel imports.

CPC might lessen its oil import volumes in 2021 due to a decrease in demand of jet fuel and fuel oil.
