= List of public sector undertakings in India =

== Central public sector companies ==
Central public sector enterprises (CPSEs) are those companies in which the direct holding of the Central Government or other CPSEs is 51% or more.

As on 31.3.2015 there were 298 CPSEs wherein, 63 enterprises are yet to commence commercial operation. The remaining 235 are operating enterprises (covering 181 scheduled CPSEs & 54 CPSEs has been considered provisional).

There are 181 scheduled CPSEs, i.e. 64 Schedule 'A', 68 Schedule 'B', 45 Schedule 'C' and 4 Schedule 'D' CPSEs.

| PSU | Inc. | Ministry | Headquarters | Sector | Group | Ratna status |
|---|---|---|---|---|---|---|
| HMT LIMITED | 1953 | Ministry of Heavy Industries | Bangalore | Manufacturing | Machine Tools Manufacturer | |
| Agriculture Insurance Company of India | 2002 | Ministry of Finance | New Delhi | Services | Insurance Services | |
| AI Engineering Services | 2006 | Ministry of Civil Aviation | New Delhi | Services | Aircraft Maintenance | |
| Airline Allied Services Limited | 1996 | Ministry of Civil Aviation | New Delhi | Services | Transport Services | |
| Airports Authority of India | 1995 | Ministry of Civil Aviation | New Delhi | Services | Transport Services | Miniratna Category - I |
| Akaltara Power | 2006 | Ministry of Power | Chhattisgarh | | | |
| Andrew Yule & Co Ltd | 1919 | Ministry of Heavy Industries & Public Enterprises D/o Heavy Industries | Kolkata, West Bengal | Manufacturing | Medium & light engineering | |
| Antrix Corporation | 2010 | Department of Space | Bangalore, Karnataka | Manufacturing | Medium & light engineering | |
| Balmer Lawrie & Company | 1972 | Ministry of Petroleum and Natural Gas | Kolkata, West Bengal | Services & Manufacturing | Medium & light engineering | Miniratna Category - I |
| Balmer & Lawrie Investments | 2001 | Ministry of Petroleum and Natural Gas | Kolkata, West Bengal | Services | Financial services | |
| BEL Optoelectronic Devices (BEL) | 1990 | Ministry of Defence D/o Defence Production | Pune, Maharashtra | Manufacturing | Medium & light engineering | |
| Bengal Chemicals & Pharmaceuticals | 1981 | Ministry of Chemicals & Fertilizers D/o Pharmaceuticals | Kolkata, West Bengal | Manufacturing | Chemicals & pharmaceuticals | |
| Bharat Coking Coal | 1972 | Ministry of Coal | Dhanbad, Jharkhand | Mining | Coal & lignite | Miniratna Category - l |
| Bharat Dynamics | 1970 | Ministry of Defence D/o Defence Production | Hyderabad, Telangana | Manufacturing | Medium & light engineering | Miniratna Category - I |
| Bharat Earth Movers (BEML) | 1964 | Ministry of Defence D/o Defence Production | Bangalore, Karnataka | Manufacturing | Transportation equipment | Miniratna Category - I |
| Bharat Electronics Limited | 1954 | Ministry of Defence D/o Defence Production | Bangalore, Karnataka | Manufacturing | Medium & light engineering | Navratna |
| Bharat Heavy Electricals (BHEL) | 1964 | Ministry of Heavy Industries & Public Enterprises D/o Heavy Industries | New Delhi | Manufacturing | Heavy engineering | Maharatna |
| Bharat Immunologicals and Biologicals Corporation | 1989 | Ministry of Science & Technology D/o Biotechnology | Bulandshahr, Uttar Pradesh | Manufacturing | Chemicals & Pharmaceuticals | |
| Bharat Petroleum | 1952 | Ministry of Petroleum and Natural Gas | Mumbai, Maharashtra | Manufacturing | Petroleum (refinery & Marketing) | Maharatna |
| Bharat Sanchar Nigam Limited | 2000 | Ministry of Communications & Information Technology D/o Telecommunications | New Delhi | Services | Telecommunication Services | Miniratna Category - I |
| Bharatiya Nabhikiya Vidyut Nigam | 2003 | Department of Atomic Energy | Chennai, Tamil Nadu | Manufacturing | | |
| Bhartiya Rail Bijlee Corporation | 2007 | Ministry of Power | New Delhi | | Enterprises Under Construction | |
| Bihar Drugs & Organic Chemicals Limited | 1994 | Ministry of Chemicals & Fertilizers D/o Pharmaceuticals | Bihar | | Dormant company | |
| Bokaro Kodarma Maithon Transmission Company | 2007 | Ministry of Power | New Delhi | | Enterprises Under Construction | |
| Brahmaputra Cracker and Polymer Limited | 2006 | Ministry of Chemicals and Fertilizers | Lepetkata, Assam | | Enterprises Under Construction | |
| Brahmaputra Valley Fertilizer Corporation | 2002 | Ministry of Chemicals & Fertilizers D/o Fertilizer | Dibrugarh, Assam | Manufacturing | Fertilizers | |
| Braithwaite & Company | 1976 | Ministry of Heavy Industries & Public Enterprises D/o Heavy Industries | Kolkata, West Bengal | Manufacturing | Heavy Engineering | |
| Braithwaite, Burn & Jessop Construction Company | 1984 | Ministry of Heavy Industries & Public Enterprises D/o Heavy Industries | Kolkata, West Bengal | Services | Contract & Construction Services | |
| Bridge and Roof Company | 1972 | Ministry of Heavy Industries & Public Enterprises D/o Heavy Industries | Kolkata, West Bengal | Services | Contract & Construction Services | Miniratna Category-I |
| British India Corporation | 1981 | Ministry of Textiles | Kanpur, Uttar Pradesh | Manufacturing | Textiles | |
| Broadcast Engineering Consultants India | 1995 | Ministry of Information & Broadcasting | New Delhi | Services | Industrial Development & Tech. Consultancy Services | Miniratna Category - II |
| Cement Corporation of India | 1965 | Ministry of Heavy Industries & Public Enterprises D/o Heavy Industries | New Delhi | Manufacturing | Consumer goods | |
| Central Coalfields Limited | 1975 | Ministry of Coal | Jharkhand | Mining | Coal & Lignite | Miniratna Category - I |
| Central Cottage Industries Corporation of India Limited | 1976 | Ministry of Textiles | New Delhi | Services | Trading & Marketing | |
| Central Electronics Limited | 1974 | Ministry of Science & Technology D/o Scientific & Industrial Research | Uttar Pradesh | Manufacturing | Medium & light engineering | |
| Central Mine Planning and Design Institute | 1975 | Ministry of Coal | Jharkhand | Services | Industrial Development & Tech. Consultancy Services | Miniratna Category II |
| Central Railside Warehousing Company | 2007 | Ministry of Consumer Affairs, Food & Public Distribution D/o Food & Public Distribution | New Delhi | Services | Trading & Marketing | |
| Central Warehousing Corporation | 1957 | Ministry of Consumer Affairs, Food & Public Distribution D/o Food & Public Distribution | New Delhi | Services | Trading & Marketing | Miniratna Category - I |
| Certification Engineers International Limited | 1994 | Ministry of Petroleum and Natural Gas | New Delhi | Services | Industrial Development & Tech. Consultancy Services | Miniratna Category - I |
| Chennai Petroleum Corporation | 1965 | Ministry of Petroleum and Natural Gas | Chennai, Tamil Nadu | Manufacturing | Petroleum (refinery & Marketing) | Miniratna Category - I |
| Coal India | 1973 | Ministry of Coal | Kolkata, West Bengal | Mining | Coal & Lignite | Maharatna |
| Coastal Karnataka Power Limited | 2006 | Ministry of Power | Karnataka | | Enterprises Under Construction | |
| Coastal Maharashtra Mega Power Limited | 2006 | Ministry of Power | Maharashtra | | Enterprises Under Construction | |
| Coastal Tamil Nadu Power Limited | 2007 | Ministry of Power | New Delhi | | Enterprises Under Construction | |
| Cochin Shipyard | 1972 | Ministry of Shipping | Kochi, Kerala | Manufacturing | Transportation Equipment | Miniratna Category - I |
| Container Corporation of India Limited | 1988 | Ministry of Railways | New Delhi | Services | Transport Services | Navratna Category - I |
| Cotton Corporation of India | 1970 | Ministry of Textiles | Mumbai, Maharashtra | Services | Trading & Marketing | |
| Damodar Valley Corporation | 1948 | Ministry of Power | Kolkata, West Bengal | Electricity | | |
| Dedicated Freight Corridor Corporation of India | 2007 | Ministry of Railways | New Delhi | Enterprises Under Construction | | |
| Delhi Metro Rail Corporation Limited | 1995 | Ministry of Urban Development | Delhi | Services | Transport Services | |
| East North Interconnection Company | 2007 | Ministry of Power | New Delhi | Enterprises Under Construction | | |
| Eastern Coalfields Limited | 1975 | Ministry of Coal | Asansol, West Bengal | Mining | Coal & Lignite | |
| Educational Consultants India Limited | 1981 | Ministry of Human Resource Development D/o Secondary Education & Higher Education | Uttar Pradesh | Services | Industrial Development & Tech. Consultancy Services | Miniratna Category - I |
| Electronics Corporation of India | 1967 | Department of Atomic Energy | Hyderabad, Telangana | Medium & light engineering | | |
| Engineering Projects (India) Limited | 1970 | Ministry of Heavy Industries & Public Enterprises D/o Heavy Industries | New Delhi | Services | Industrial Development & Tech. Consultancy Services | Miniratna Category - II |
| Engineers India Limited | 1965 | Ministry of Petroleum and Natural Gas | New Delhi | Services | Industrial Development & Tech. Consultancy Services | Navratna |
| Export Credit Guarantee Corporationof India | 1957 | Ministry of Commerce & Industry D/o Commerce | Mumbai, Maharashtra | Services | Financial Services | |
| FCI Aravali Gypsum & Minerals India Limited | 2003 | Ministry of Chemicals & Fertilizers D/o Fertilizer | Jodhpur, Rajasthan | Mining | Other Minerals & Metals | Miniratna Category - II |
| Fertilisers and Chemicals Travancore | 1943 | Ministry of Chemicals & Fertilizers D/o Fertilizer | Kochi, Kerala | Manufacturing | Fertilizers | |
| Fertilizer Corporation of India Limited | 1961 | Ministry of Chemicals & Fertilizers D/o Fertilizer | Noida, Uttar Pradesh | Manufacturing | Fertilizers | |
| Food Corporation of India | 1965 | Ministry of Consumer Affairs, Food & Public Distribution D/o Food & Public Distribution | New Delhi | Services | Trading & Marketing | |
| Fresh & Healthy Enterprises | 2006 | Ministry of Railways | Sonepat, Haryana | Services | Transport Services | |
| GAIL (India) Limited | 1984 | Ministry of Petroleum and Natural Gas | New Delhi | Manufacturing & Trading | Petroleum (Refining & Marketing) | Maharatna |
| Garden Reach Shipbuilders & Engineers | 1960 | Ministry of Defence D/o Defence Production | Kolkata, West Bengal | Manufacturing | Transportation Equipment | Miniratna Category - I |
| General Insurance Corporation of India Limited (GIC) | 1972 | Ministry of Finance | Mumbai, Maharashtra | Services | | |
| Ghogarpalli Integrated Power Company Limited | 2009 | Ministry of Power | New Delhi | Enterprises Under Construction | | |
| Goa Shipyard | 1967 | Ministry of Defence D/o Defence Production | Vasco da Gama, Goa | Manufacturing | Transportation Equipment | Miniratna Category - I |
| Heavy Engineering Corporation | 1958 | Ministry of Heavy Industries & Public Enterprises D/o Heavy Industries | Jharkhand | Manufacturing | Heavy Engineering | |
| Hindustan Aeronautics Limited | 1963 | Ministry of Defence D/o Defence Production | Bangalore, Karnataka | Manufacturing | Transportation Equipment | Maharatna |
| Hindustan Antibiotics | 1954 | Ministry of Chemicals & Fertilizers D/o Pharmaceuticals | Pune, Maharashtra | Manufacturing | Chemicals & Pharmaceuticals | |
| Hindustan Copper Limited | 1967 | Ministry of Mines | Kolkata, West Bengal | Mining | Other Minerals & Metals | Miniratna Category - I |
| Hindustan Fertilizer Corporation Limited | 1978 | Ministry of Chemicals & Fertilizers D/o Fertilizer | New Delhi | Manufacturing | Fertilizers | |
| Hindustan Insecticides | 1954 | Ministry of Chemicals & Fertilizers D/o Chemicals & Petrochemicals | New Delhi | Manufacturing | Chemicals & Pharmaceuticals | |
| Hindustan Paper Corporation | 1970 | Ministry of Heavy Industries & Public Enterprises D/o Heavy Industries | Kolkata, West Bengal | Manufacturing | Consumer goods | Miniratna Category - I |
| Hindustan Salts Limited (Sambhar salt) | 1959 | Ministry of Heavy Industries & Public Enterprises D/o Heavy Industries | Jaipur, Rajasthan | Manufacturing | Chemicals & Pharmaceuticals | |
| Hindustan Shipyard | 1952 | Ministry of Shipping | Visakhapatnam, Andhra Pradesh | Manufacturing | Transportation Equipment | |
| HLL Lifecare | 1966 | Ministry of Health & Family Welfare D/o of Health And Family Welfare | Thiruvananthapuram, Kerala | Manufacturing | Contraceptives, Pharma, Medical Devices | Miniratna Category - I |
| Hooghly Dock & Port Engineers Limited | 1984 | Ministry of Shipping | Kolkata, West Bengal | Manufacturing | Transportation Equipment | |
| Hooghly Printing Company | 1979 | Ministry of Heavy Industries & Public Enterprises D/o Heavy Industries | Kolkata, West Bengal | Manufacturing | Consumer goods | |
| Housing and Urban Development Corporation | 1970 | Ministry of Housing and Urban Poverty Alleviation | New Delhi | Services | Financial Services | Miniratna Category - I |
| IFCI Limited | 1993 | Ministry of Finance | New Delhi | Services | Industrial financing | |
| Il Power Electronics Limited | 2000 | Ministry of Heavy Industries & Public Enterprises D/o Heavy Industries | Kota, Rajasthan | Enterprises Under Construction | | |
| India Infrastructure Finance Company | 2006 | Ministry of Finance D/o Economic Affairs | New Delhi | Services | Financial Services | |
| India Tourism Development Corporation | 1966 | Ministry of Tourism | | Services | Tourist services | Miniratna Category - I |
| India Trade Promotion Organisation | 1976 | Ministry of Commerce & Industry D/o Commerce | | Services | Trading & Marketing | Miniratna Category - I |
| Indian Oil Corporation | 1964 | Ministry of Petroleum and Natural Gas | New Delhi | Manufacturing | Petroleum (refinery & Marketing) | Maharatna |
| Indian Railway Catering and Tourism Corporation | 1999 | Ministry of Railways | | Services | Tourist services | Miniratna Category - I |
| Indian Railway Construction Limited (IRCON) | 1976 | Ministry of Railways | New Delhi | Services | Contract & Construction Services | |
| Indian Railway Finance Corporation | 1986 | Ministry of Railways | | Services | Financial Services | |
| Indian Rare Earths Limited | 1950 | Department of Atomic Energy | Mumbai, Maharashtra | Mining | Other Minerals & Metals | |
| Indian Renewable Energy Development Agency | 1987 | Ministry of New and Renewable Energy | New Delhi | Services | Financial Services | Miniratna Category-I |
| Indian Vaccine Corporation | 1988 | Ministry of Science & Technology D/o Biotechnology | New Delhi | | | |
| Instrumentation Control Valves | 2000 | Ministry of Heavy Industries & Public Enterprises D/o Heavy Industries | Rajasthan | | | |
| ITI | 1948 | Ministry of Communications & Information Technology D/o Telecommunications | Bangalore, Karnataka | Manufacturing | Medium & light engineering | |
| J & K Mineral Development Corporation | 1989 | Ministry of Steel | Jammu & Kashmir | Mining | Other minerals & metals | |
| Jagdishpur Paper Mills | 2008 | Ministry of Heavy Industries & Public Enterprises D/o Heavy Industries | Uttar Pradesh | Enterprises Under Construction | | |
| Jute Corporation of India | 1971 | Ministry of Textiles | Kolkata, West Bengal | Services | Trading & Marketing | |
| Karnataka Antibiotics & Pharmaceuticals | 1981 | Ministry of Chemicals & Fertilizers D/o Pharmaceuticals | Karnataka | Manufacturing | Chemicals & Pharmaceuticals | |
| Karnataka Trade Promotion Organisation | 2000 | Ministry of Commerce & Industry D/o Commerce | Karnataka | Services | Trading & Marketing | |
| KIOCL | 1976 | Ministry of Steel | Karnataka | Mining | Other Minerals & Metals | |
| Kochi Refineries | 1963 | Ministry of Petroleum and Natural Gas | Kochi, Kerala | Manufacturing | Petroleum (refinery & Marketing) | |
| Konkan Railway Corporation | 1990 | Ministry of Railways | Navi Mumbai, Maharashtra | Services | Contract & Construction Services | |
| Kumarakruppa Frontier Hotels | 2001 | Ministry of Tourism | | Services | Financial Services | Miniratna Category - I |
| Madras Fertilizers Limited | 1966 | Ministry of Chemicals & Fertilizers D/o Fertilizer | Chennai, Tamil Nadu | Manufacturing | Fertilizers | |
| Mahanadi Coalfields Limited | 1992 | Ministry of Coal | Sambalpur, Odisha | Mining | Coal & Lignite | Miniratna Category - I |
| Maharashtra Elektrosmelt | 1974 | Ministry of Steel | Mumbai, Maharashtra | Manufacturing | Steel | |
| Mangalore Refinery & Petrochemicals | 1988 | Ministry of Petroleum and Natural Gas | Mangalore, Karnataka | Manufacturing | Petroleum (Refining & Marketing) | Miniratna Category - I |
| Manganese Ore India | 1977 | Ministry of Steel | Nagpur, Maharashtra | Mining | Other Minerals & Metals | Miniratna Category - I |
| Mazagon Dock | 1934 | Ministry of Defence D/o Defence Production | Mumbai, Maharashtra | Manufacturing | Transportation Equipment | Miniratna Category - I |
| MECON Limited | 1973 | Ministry of Steel | Ranchi, Jharkhand | Services | Industrial Development & Tech. Consultancy Services | Miniratna Category - I |
| Millennium Telecom | 2000 | Ministry of Communications & Information Technology D/o Telecommunications | Mumbai, Maharashtra | Services | Telecommunication Services | |
| Mineral Exploration Corporation Limited | 1972 | Ministry of Mines | Nagpur, Maharashtra | Services | Contract & Construction Services | Miniratna Category - II |
| Mishra Dhatu Nigam | 1973 | Ministry of Defence D/o Defence Production | Hyderabad, Telangana | Manufacturing | Steel | Navratna |
| MMTC | 1963 | Ministry of Commerce & Industry D/o Commerce | New Delhi | Services | Trading, Manufacturing & Marketing | Miniratna Category - I |
| MSTC Limited | 1964 | Ministry of Steel | Kolkata, West Bengal | Services | Trading & Marketing | Miniratna Category - I |
| Mumbai Railway Vikas Corporation | 1999 | Ministry of Railways | Mumbai, Maharashtra | Services | Contract & Construction Services | |
| Nagaland Pulp & Paper Company | 1971 | Ministry of Heavy Industries & Public Enterprises D/o Heavy Industries | Kolkata | Manufacturing | Consumer goods | |
| NHPC Limited | 1975 | Ministry of Power | Faridabad, Haryana | Electricity | Power Generation | Navratna |
| National Aluminium Co Ltd | 1981 | Ministry of Mines | Bhubaneshwar, Odisha | Mining | Other Minerals & Metals | Navratna |
| National Backward Classes Finance and Development Corporation | 1992 | Ministry of Social Justice and Empowerment | | Services | Financial Services | |
| National Buildings Construction Corporation | 1960 | Ministry of Urban Development | New Delhi | Services | Contract & Construction Services | Navratna |
| National Fertilizers Limited | 1974 | Ministry of Chemicals & Fertilizers D/o Fertilizers | Noida, Uttar Pradesh | Manufacturing | Fertilizers | Miniratna Category - I |
| National Cooperative Development Corporation | 1963 | Ministry of Consumer Affairs, Food and Public Distribution | New Delhi | cooperative | | |
| National Film Development Corporation of India | 1975 | Ministry of Information & Broadcasting | Mumbai, Maharashtra | Services | Financial Services | Miniratna Category - II |
| National Handicapped Finance and Development Corporation | 1997 | Ministry of Social Justice and Empowerment | | Services | Financial Services | |
| National Handloom Development Corporation Limited | 1983 | Ministry of Textiles | Lucknow, Uttar Pradesh | Services | Trading & Marketing | |
| National Informatics Centre Services Incorporated | 1995 | Ministry of Communications & Information Technology D/o Information Technology | | Services | Industrial Development & Tech. Consultancy Services | |
| National Insurance Co Ltd | 1906 | Ministry of Finance, Dept of Economic Affairs, Banking & Insurance Division | Kolkata, West Bengal | Services | Insurance | |
| National Minorities Development and Finance Corporation | 1994 | Ministry of Minority Affairs | | Services | Financial Services | |
| National Projects Construction Corporation Limited | 1957 | Ministry of Water Resources, River Development & Ganga Rejuvenation | New Delhi | Services | Contract & Construction Services | |
| National Research Development Corporation | 1953 | Ministry of Science & Technology D/o Scientific & Industrial Research | | Services | Industrial Development & Tech. Consultancy Services | |
| National Safai Karamcharis Finance and Development Corporation | 1997 | Ministry of Social Justice and Empowerment | | Services | Financial Services | |
| National Scheduled Castes Finance and Development Corporation | 1989 | Ministry of Social Justice and Empowerment | | Services | Financial Services | |
| National Scheduled Tribes Finance and Development Corporation (NSTFDC) | 2001 | Ministry of Tribal Affairs | New Delhi | Services | Financial Services | |
| National Seeds Corporation Limited | 1963 | Ministry of Agriculture D/o Agriculture and Cooperation | New Delhi | Agriculture | Agro Based Industries | Mini Ratna Company Category -1 |
| National Small Industries Corporation | 1955 | Ministry of Micro, Small and Medium Enterprises | | Services | Industrial Development & Tech. Consultancy Services | |
| National Textile Corporation | 1968 | Ministry of Textiles | New Delhi | Manufacturing | Textiles | |
| Nepa Limited (Formally National Newsprint and Paper Mills Limited) | 1947 | Ministry of Heavy Industries & Public Enterprises D/o Heavy Industries | Madhya Pradesh | Manufacturing | Consumer goods | |
| New India Assurance Company | 1919 | Ministry of Finance, Dept of Economic Affairs, Banking & Insurance Division | Mumbai, Maharashtra | Services | Insurance | |
| NLC India Limited | 1956 | Ministry of Coal | Tamil Nadu | Mining | Coal & Lignite | Navratna Category |
| State Bank of India | 1956 | Ministry of Finance | | Services | Banking | |
| NLC Tamil Nadu Power | 2006 | Ministry of Coal | Tamil Nadu | Enterprises Under Construction | | |
| NMDC Limited | 1958 | Ministry of Steel | Hyderabad, Telangana | Mining | Other Minerals & Metals | Navratna |
| North Eastern Handicrafts & Handloom Development Corporation | 1977 | Ministry for Development of North Eastern Region | Shillong, Meghalaya | Services | Trading & Marketing | |
| North Eastern Regional Agricultural Marketing Corporation | 1982 | Ministry for Development of North Eastern Region | Assam | Agriculture | Agro Based Industries | |
| North Karanpura Transmission Company | 2007 | Ministry of Power | New Delhi | Enterprises Under Construction | | |
| Northern Coalfields | 1985 | Ministry of Coal | Singrauli, Madhya Pradesh | Mining | Coal & Lignite | Miniratna Category - I |
| NTPC | 1975 | Ministry of Power | New Delhi | Electricity | Power Generation | Maharatna |
| Nuclear Power Corporation of India (NPCIL) | 1987 | Department of Atomic Energy | Mumbai | Electricity | Generation | |
| Numaligarh Refinery Limited | 1993 | Ministry of Petroleum and Natural Gas | Assam | Manufacturing | Petroleum (refinery & Marketing) | Navratna |
| Oil & Natural Gas Corporation | 1956 | Ministry of Petroleum and Natural Gas | Dehradun, Uttarakhand | Mining | Crude Oil | Maharatna |
| Oil India Limited | 1981 | Ministry of Petroleum and Natural Gas | Duliajan, Assam | Mining | Crude Oil | Maharatna |
| ONGC Videsh | 1965 | Ministry of Petroleum and Natural Gas | | Mining | Crude Oil | |
| ONGC Mangalore Petrochemicals Limited | 2006 | Ministry of Petroleum and Natural Gas | Karnataka | Manufacturing | Petrochemicals | |
| Oriental Insurance Company | 1947 | Ministry of Finance, Dept of Economic Affairs, Banking & Insurance Division | New Delhi | Services | Insurance | |
| Orissa Drugs & Chemicals | 1979 | Ministry of Chemicals & Fertilizers D/o Pharmaceuticals | Bhubaneswar, Odisha | Manufacturing | Chemicals & Pharmaceuticals | |
| Orissa Integrated Power | 2006 | Ministry of Power | New Delhi | Enterprises Under Construction | | |
| Power Finance Corporation Limited | 1986 | Ministry of Power | | Services | Financial Services | Navratna |
| Power Grid Corporation of India Limited | 1989 | Ministry of Power | | Electricity | Transmission | Maharatna |
| Punjab Ashok Hotel Company | 1998 | Ministry of Tourism | | | | |
| Rail Vikas Nigam | 2003 | Ministry of Railways | | Services | Contract & Construction Services | |
| Railtel Corporation India | 2000 | Ministry of Railways | | Services | Telecommunication Services | Miniratna Category - I |
| Rajasthan Electronics and Instruments | 1981 | Ministry of Heavy Industries & Public Enterprises D/o Heavy Industries | Jaipur, Rajasthan | Manufacturing | Medium & light engineering | Miniratna Category - II |
| Ranchi Ashok Bihar Hotel Corporation | 1983 | Ministry of Tourism | Ranchi, Jharkhand | Services | Tourist services | |
| Rashtriya Chemicals & Fertilizers | 1978 | Ministry of Chemicals & Fertilizers D/o Fertilizer | Mumbai, Maharashtra | Manufacturing | Fertilizers | Miniratna Category - I |
| Richardson & Cruddas | 1972 | Ministry of Heavy Industries & Public Enterprises D/o Heavy Industries | Mumbai, Maharashtra | Manufacturing | Medium & light engineering | |
| Rites | 1974 | Ministry of Railways | Gurgaon, Haryana | Services | Industrial Development & Tech. Consultancy Services | Miniratna Category - II |
| SJVN Limited | 1988 | Ministry of Power | Shimla, Himachal Pradesh | Electricity | Generation | Miniratna Category - I |
| Security Printing and Minting Corporation of India Limited | 2006 | Ministry of Finance D/o Economic Affairs | | Manufacturing | Consumer goods | Miniratna Category - I |
| Shipping Corporation of India Limited | 1961 | Ministry of Shipping | Mumbai, Maharashtra | Services | Transport services | Navratna |
| South Eastern Coalfields | 1985 | Ministry of Coal | Chhattisgarh | Mining | Coal & Lignite | Miniratna Category - I |
| Sponge Iron India | 1978 | Ministry of Steel | Hyderabad, Telangana | Manufacturing | Steel | |
| State Farms Corporation of India | 1969 | Ministry of Agriculture D/o Agriculture And Cooperation | | Agriculture | Agro Based Industries | |
| State Trading Corporation of India | 1956 | Ministry of Commerce & Industry D/o Commerce | | Services | Trading & Marketing | Miniratna Category - I |
| Steel Authority of India Limited | 1973 | Ministry of Steel | | Manufacturing | Steel | Maharatna |
| Talcher-II Transmission Company | 2007 | Ministry of Power | New Delhi | | | |
| Tamil Nadu Trade Promotion Organisation | 2000 | Ministry of Commerce & Industry D/o Commerce | Chennai, Tamil Nadu | Services | Trading & marketing | |
| Telecommunications Consultants India | 1978 | Ministry of Communications & Information Technology D/o Telecommunications | | Services | Industrial Development & Tech. Consultancy Services | Miniratna Category - I |
| United India Insurance Company | 1938 | Ministry of Finance, Dept of Economic Affairs, Banking & Insurance Division | Chennai, Tamil Nadu | Services | Insurance | |
| Uranium Corporation of India | 1967 | Department of Atomic Energy | Jaduguda, Jharkhand | Mining | Other minerals & metals | |
| Utkal Ashok Hotel Corporation | 1983 | Ministry of Tourism | Puri, Odisha | Services | Tourist services | |
| Vignyan Industries | 1984 | Ministry of Defence D/o Defence Production | Karnataka | Manufacturing | Medium & light engineering | |
| WAPCOS Limited | 1969 | Ministry of Water Resources, River Development & Ganga Rejuvenation | New Delhi | Services | Industrial Development & Tech. Consultancy Services | Miniratna Category - I |
| Western Coalfields | 1975 | Ministry of Coal | Nagpur, Maharashtra | Mining | Coal & Lignite | Miniratna Category - I |
| Rashtriya Ispat Nigam | 1982 | Ministry of Steel | Visakhapatnam, Andhrapradesh | Manufacturing | Steel | Navratna Category |
| Utkarsha Aluminium Dhatu Nigam Limited (UADNL) | 2019 | Ministry of Defence D/o Defence Production | Nellore, Andhrapradesh | Manufacturing | Steel | Miniratna Category - II |

== Public Ports ==
- Chennai Port Authority
- Cochin Port Authority
- Deendayal Port Authority
- Jawaharlal Nehru Port Authority
- Paradip Port Authority
- Syama Prasad Mookerjee Port Authority
- Mormugao Port Authority
- Mumbai Port Authority
- New Mangalore Port Authority
- Visakhapatnam Port Authority
- V.O.Chidambarnar Port Authority
- Kamarajar Port Limited

== List of PSUs under RBI ==
- Unit Trust of India (UTI)
- EXIM Bank
- Bharatiya Reserve Bank Note Mudran Pvt. Ltd. (BRBNML)
- Deposit Insurance and Credit Guarantee Corporation (DICGC)
- Small Industries Development Bank of India
- Receivables Exchange of India

== List of Public Factories under Railways ==
- Modern Coach Factory, Raebareli
- Rail Coach Factory, Kapurthala
- Rail Wheel Factory
- Rail Wheel Plant, Bela
- Integral Coach Factory

== New Public Sector Companies ==
| Company name when it was a PSU | Founded (year) | Company type |
|---|---|---|
| Chenab Valley Power Projects | 2011 | JV of PSUs |
| Central Transmission Utility of India Limited (CTUIL) | 2020 | Subsidiary of PSU |
| DFCCIL | 2006 | SPV |
| Convergence Energy Services Limited (CESL) | 2020 | Subsidiary of PSU |
| India Ports Global Limited | 2015 | JV of Public Ports |
| Green Valley Renewable Energy Limited | 2022 | JV of PSUs |
| Solar Energy Corporation of India | 2011 | CPSE |
| Indian Highway Management Company Limited | 2011 | CPSE |
| National Internet Exchange of India(NIXI) | 2003 | Section 25 |
| Hindustan Urvarak and Rasayan Limited | 2016 | JV of PSUs |
| India Infrastructure Finance Co. Ltd (IIFCL) | 2006 | SPV |
| NewSpace India Ltd (NSIL) | 2019 | CPSE |
| NMDC Steel Limited | 2021 | CPSE |
| National Investment and Infrastructure Fund | 2015 | CPSE |
| National Capital Region Transport Corporation | 2013 | SPV |
| BHAVINI | 2003 | CPSE |
| Anushakti Vidhyut Nigam Limited | 2011 | JV of PSUs |
| Talcher Fertilizers | 2015 | JV of PSUs |
| TUSCO Ltd. | 2020 | Subsidiary of PSU |
| Government e Marketplace | 2016 | SPV |
| Hooghly Cochin Shipyard Limited | 2017 | Subsidiary of PSU |
| Digital India Corporation | 2013 | Section 8 |
| EESL | 2009 | JV of PSUs |
| Indian Port Rail Corporation Limited (IRPCL) | 2015 | Subsidiary of PSU |
| Ramagundam Fertilizers and Chemicals Limited | 2015 | JV of PSUs |
| Petronet LNG | 1998 | JV of PSUs |
| Konkan LNG Ltd. | 2015 | under GAIL |
| Reserve Bank Information Technology Pvt. Ltd. (ReBIT) | 2017 | Under RBI |
| IDFC First Bank | 2015 | Subsidiary of Public Financial Institution IDFC |
| National Highways and Infrastructure Development Corporation Limited (NHIDCL) | 2014 | CPSE |
| National Industrial Corridor Development Corporation Limited (NICDC) | 2008 | CPSE |
| National Highways Logistics Management Company | 2021 | Subsidiary of NHAI |
| National Payments Corporation of India | 2008 | JV of PSBs |
| National High Power Test Laboratory (NHTPL) | 2009 | JV of PSUs |

== List of PSUs under NHAI ==
- National Highways Logistics Management Limited (NHLML)
- National Highways Infra Investment Managers Private Limited
- DME Development Limited (DMEDL)

== Disinvested/Merged Public Sector Companies ==
| Company name when it was a PSU | Disinvested (year) | Present owner |
|---|---|---|
| Hindustan Steelworks Construction Limited | 2017 | NBCC |
| Donyi Polo Ashok Hotel | 2017 | Government of Arunachal Pradesh (joint venture, Government of India sold its stake to the Government of Arunachal Pradesh) |
| Madhya Pradesh Ashok Hotel Corporation | 2017 | Government of Madhya Pradesh (transferred ownership to the Government of Madhya Pradesh) |
| Bharatpur Ashok Hotel Corporation | 2017 | Government of Rajasthan (transferred ownership to the Government of Rajasthan) |
| Patliputra Ashok Hotel Corporation | 2018 | Government of Bihar (transferred ownership to the Government of Bihar) |
| Srinagar Centaur Hotel | 2017 | Government of Jammu and Kashmir (transferred ownership to the Government of Jammu and Kashmir) |
| Pondicherry Ashok Hotel Corporation | 2017 | Government of Puducherry (transferred ownership to the Government of Puducherry) |
| Mangalore Refinery & Petrochemicals | 2018 | merged with HPCL |
| Dredging Corporation of India | 2018 | Broken up among four ports: Vishakhapatnam Port Trust, Paradeep Port Trust, Jawaharlal Nehru Port Trust and Kandla Port Trust |
| HSCC | 2018 | acquired by NBCC |
| Rural Electrification Corporation Limited | 2018 | acquired by Power Finance Corporation |
| Hindustan Petroleum Corporation Limited | 2018 | acquired by Oil and Natural Gas Corporation (ONGC) |
| Kamarajar Port | 2019 | acquired by Chennai Port Trust |
| North Eastern Electric Power Corporation Limited (NEEPCO) | 2020 | acquired by NTPC Limited |
| Tehri Hydro Development Corporation | 2020 | acquired by NTPC Limited (74.23%), Government of Uttarakhand (25.77%) |
| Mahanagar Telephone Nigam Limited (MTNL) | 2020 | acquired by Bharat Sanchar Nigam Limited (BSNL) |
| Hindustan Newsprint | 2020 | Government of Kerala (transferred ownership to the Government of Kerala) |
| Ranchi Ashok Bihar Hotel Corporation | 2020 | Government of Jharkhand (transferred ownership to the Government of Jharkhand) |
| Jammu Ashok Hotel Corporation | 2020 | Government of Jammu and Kashmir (transferred ownership to the Government of Jammu and Kashmir) |

== Privatised Public Sector Companies ==
| Company name when it was a PSU | Privatised/Acquired/Merged (year) | Present owner |
|---|---|---|
| The Madras Aluminium Company Limited (MALCO) | 2004 | Vedanta Resources |
| Hindustan Teleprinters Limited | 2001 | HFCL |
| Bharat Aluminium Company | 2001 | Vedanta Resources |
| Hindustan Zinc | 2001 | Vedanta Resources (64.92%), Government of India (29.54%) |
| Modern Food Industries | 2000 | Grupo Bimbo |
| MMTC PAMP India Private Limited | 2008 | PAMP, SA Switzerland (71%), Government of India (29%) |
| Jessop & Company | 2003 | Ruia Group, bankrupted in 2013 |
| CMC Limited | 2001 | TCS |
| Maruti Suzuki | 2002 | Maruti Suzuki |
| Indian Petrochemicals Corporation Limited | 2002 | Reliance Industries |
| Hotel Janpath | 2018 | Bloom Hotel Group |
| Air India | 2022 | Tata Group |
| Air India Express Limited | 2022 | Tata Group |
| Air India-SATS (AISATS) | 2022 | Tata Group (50%), SATS Ltd (50%) |
| Neelachal Ispat Nigam Limited (NINL) | 2022 | Tata Steel |
| IDFC First Bank | 2024 | IDFC-IDFC Bank merger(transferred ownership of parent IDFC to its subsidiary IDFC First Bank) |
| Ferro Scrap Nigam Limited | 2025 | Konoike Transport Co., Ltd |
| IDBI Bank | 2026 | Fairfax Financial (60.72%), Government of India (17%), Life Insurance Corporation of India (19%) |
| Indian Medicines & Pharmaceutical Corporation | 2026 | M/s. Skymap Pharmaceuticals Private Limited |

== Liquidated public sector companies ==
| Company name when it was shut down | Year liquidated |
|---|---|
| Hindustan Cables Limited | 2016 |
| Hindustan Photo Films Manufacturing Company | 2015 |
| Tungabhadra Steel Products | 2015 |
| Tamil Nadu Goods Transport Corporation Limited | 2017 |
| Instrumentation Limited | 2016 |
| Andaman & Nicobar Islands Forest and Plantation Development Corporation | 2017 |
| Hindustan Organic Chemicals Limited ( 9 of 14 factories to be shuttered) | 2016 |
| Tyre Corporation of India | 2016 |
| Bharat Wagon & Engg. Company | 2017 |
| Hindustan Vegetable Oils Corporation Limited | 2016 |
| Triveni Structurals | 2016 |
| Birds Jute and Export | 2016 |
| Bharat Immunologicals & Biologicals Corporation Ltd. | 2024 |
| Central Inland Water Transport Corporation | 2016 |
| Creda HPCL Biofuel | 2016 |
| National Jute Manufactures Corporation | 2016 |
| PEC (Project & Equipment Corporation of India) | 2017 |
| STCL Ltd (Spice Trading Corporation of India) | 2016 |
| Elgin Mills | 2017 |
| Indian Airlines | 2011 (merged with Air India) |
| I A L Airport Services | 2010 |
| Air India Cargo | 2012 |
| Burn Standard Company | 2018 |
| Mining & Allied Machinery Corporation Limited | 2002 |
| Assam Ashok Hotel Corporation Ltd | 2017 |
| Biecco Lawrie | 2018 |
| Delhi Centaur Hotel | 2019 |
| Hindustan Prefab Limited | 2019 |
| Scooters India Limited | 2021 |
| Hindustan Fluorocarbons Limited | 2021 |
| Bharat Pumps & Compressors | 2021 |
| Cachar Paper Mill & Nagaon Paper Mill- The units of Hindustan Paper Corporation Limited | 2021 |
| Sugar Mill | 2021 |
| Handicrafts and Handlooms Export Corporation of India | 2021 |
| Indian Drugs & Pharmaceuticals | 2021 |
| Rajasthan Drugs & Pharmaceuticals | 2021 |

List of PSEs/Subsidiaries/Units of CPSE's Heavy Industries Department under liquidation
PSU Subsidiary/Unit
Bharat Ophthalmic Glass Limited
Bharat Leader Corporation Limited
Tannery and Footwear Corporation of India Limited
Rehabilitation Industries Corporation
Bharat Yantra Nigam Limited
National Bicycle Corporation of India Limited
National Industrial Development Corporation Limited
Mining and Allied Machinery Corporation Limited
Cycle Corporation of India Limited
Jessop and Company Limited
Lagan Jute Machinery Company Limited
Reyrolle Burn Limited
Weighbird (India) Limited
Bharat Brakes and Valves Limited
Bharat Process and Mechanical Engineers Limited
Mandaya Paper Mills Limited
Tyre Corporation of India Limited
Triveni Structurals Limited
HMT (Bearing) Limited
HMT (Watches) Limited
HMT (Chinar Watches) Limited
HMT Limited - Tractor Division, Pinjore
Tungabhadra Steel Plants Limited
Hindustan Cables Limited
Hindustan Photo Films Manufacturing Company Limited
Instrumentation Limited - Kota and Palakkad Units
