= Privatisation of public sector undertakings in India =

Privatization process

Privatization of public sector undertakings in India is a process of public asset sales done by the president of India on behalf of the Government of India. It can be directly offered for sale to the private sector or indirectly done through a bidding process whereas Disinvestment is partial sale of stake through IPO or market mechanisms but still controlling majority stake or controlling as a subsidiary of another PSU to make them more efficient. Many PSUs buy other PSUs from Government for their own expansion or better functioning. Many government departments, agencies and authorities are undergoing massive corporatization before disinvestment and privatization.

The Public Enterprises Survey (2015–16), brought out by the Department of Public Enterprises, Ministry of Heavy Industries, Government of India on the performance of Central Public Sector Enterprises (CPSEs) was placed in both the Houses of Parliament on 21 March 2017. There were 331 CPSEs in 2017–18, out of which 257 were in operation. The remaining 74 of the CPSEs were being established.

== Overview ==
Following the theories of economic liberalism and infrastructure-based development as referenced in the Union Budget of India, the total expenditure of the Government of India increased from ₹1,13,422 crore in 1991–92 to ₹ 21,46,735 Crore in 2017–18. To help raise the necessary capital for these expenditures and also to minimise the nation's fiscal deficit, the Government of India started privatisation of all government establishments which includes public sector undertakings. Conceding to the demands of privatisation, the Government of India slowly began the privatisation of government establishments such as PSU's despite stiff resistance from labour unions. The below table provides data regarding the disinvestment process which began in 1991 (barring two small units being CMC Limited and Patherele Concrete).

== History ==
=== Rise of Dirigisme after 1991 reforms ===
After liberalisation in 1991, India shifted from a mixed planned led Soviet type model to a more market-oriented dirigisme economy with indicative planning. The 1991 reforms led to formation of pseudo-state owned companies by Government of India such as NSE, NSDL, CRISIL, IL&FS, IDFC etc. which were joint-venture/subsidiary of Public Sector Undertakings(PSUs) or Public ownership disguised as Private and controlling stake(>25%) owned by PSUs as a protectionist policy to lead the market reforms instead of invisible free-hand of free market.The Eighth Five Year Plan (1992 - 1997) adopted Indicative Planning in India. The Eighth Five Year Plan (1992 - 1997) managed the transition from a centrally planned economy to a market led economy through indicative planning and public sector.

=== 1999–2004 ===
Major disinvestment steps were taken in the past by the BJP-led NDA government between 1999 and 2004. BJP privatised the central government establishments such as central public sector units which included Bharat Aluminium Company (BALCO), Hindustan Zinc (both to Sterlite Industries), Indian Petrochemicals Corporation Limited (to Reliance Industries) and VSNL (to the Tata group) and various state government establishments which included many state public sector units.

=== 2014–2024 ===
Between 2014 and 2018 the BJP-led NDA government divested a total of ₹1,94,646 crore, which included minority and majority stakes of the most profitable central government establishments such ONGC-HPCL deal which was worth ₹ 36,915 crore. In the budgetary announcements of the financial year 2017–18, the late Finance minister Arun Jaitley announced that the government will initiate privatisation of 24 CPSUs, including Air India Limited which turned from a profit making entity into a loss making entity during the INC-UPA government during the year 2007–2008. This would have been the first year in which the government was on track to hit the divestment target. However, this did not go through as planned since the COVID-19 crisis threw the entire world economy into disarray.

On 17 May 2020, as part of a package the Finance minister Nirmala Sitharaman announced that the government will privatise all government establishments which also includes Public sector enterprises in all the sectors. She also stated that in all the strategic sectors, the number of PSU's will be limited to 4. In strategic sectors with more than 4 PSU's, the government will privatise, merge or consolidate the PSU's under holding companies in order to reduce wasteful administrative costs. Nirmala Sitharaman stated that there is a need for a coherent policy where all sectors are open to private sector participation while PSU's play an important role in defined areas.

Since financial year 1991–92 to 2017–18 the Government of India sold public assets totalling ₹3,47,439 Crore. In recent years, certain public sector undertakings performed reasonably well and paid significant dividends to the government, whereas other PSU's such as Air India, BSNL, and MTNL made huge losses, costing the taxpayer massive amounts of money. Net Profit of all 257 operating CPSEs during 2016–17 stood at ₹ 1,27,602 crore compared to ₹ 1,14,239 crore during 2015–16 showing growth of 11.70%, while Loss of loss incurring CPSEs minimized to ₹ 25,045 crore in 2016–17 compared to ₹ 30,759 crore in 2015–16 showing a decrease in loss by 18.58%. According to government data, 96 new CPSEs were incorporated between 2014 and 2022.

==== List of entities privatized ====
- Rani Kamalapati railway station was privatized in 2017
- Air India – sold to Tata Group in 2021
- Neelachal Ispat Nigam Limited - sold to Tata Steel Long Products in 2022
- Protean eGov Technologies, formerly known as NSDL e-Gov Infrastructure Limited (a subsidiary of NSDL), Government of India to sell stakes via SUUTI (Specified Undertaking of The Unit Trust of India), IDBI Bank, Union Bank of India and State Bank of India through IPO in 2023.
- IDFC First Bank In 2024 the controlling parent IDFC, a Government of India entity merged into IDFC First Bank leading to privatization of the bank.
- NSDL, In 2025 SUUTI (Specified Undertaking of the Unit Trust of India) sold 34.15 lakh shares in the IPO, representing a government share sale since SUUTI holds shares on behalf of the Government of India, along with that PSBs such as IDBI Bank, Union Bank of India and State Bank of India sold their stakes partially through IPO.
- Ferro Scrap Nigam Limited was privatized and taken over by Konoike Transport Co. Ltd., Japan in 2025.
- Dugda Coal Washery, Bokaro of Bharat Coking Coal was handed over to JSW Steel in 2026.
- Indian Medicines Pharmaceutical Corporation Ltd (IMPCL) sold to Skymap Pharmaceutical Pvt Limited in 2026.
- National Stock Exchange of India, 10 PSUs to sell their entire stake in NSE via IPO.
- IDBI Bank, the bank was sold to Fairfax Financial in 2026.

==== List of entities undergone corporatization ====
- Damodar Valley Corporation in 2024.
- Indian Ordinance Factory in 2021.
- IDFC First Bank in 2015

== Disinvested Public Sector Companies ==
Company name when it was a PSU	Disinvested (year)	Present owner
Hindustan Steelworks Construction Limited	2017	NBCC
Donyi Polo Ashok Hotel	2017	Government of Arunachal Pradesh (joint venture, Government of India sold its stake to the Government of Arunachal Pradesh)
Madhya Pradesh Ashok Hotel Corporation	2017	Government of Madhya Pradesh (transferred ownership to the Government of Madhya Pradesh)
Bharatpur Ashok Hotel Corporation	2017	Government of Rajasthan (transferred ownership to the Government of Rajasthan)
Patliputra Ashok Hotel Corporation	2018	Government of Bihar (transferred ownership to the Government of Bihar)
Srinagar Centaur Hotel	2017	Government of Jammu and Kashmir (transferred ownership to the Government of Jammu and Kashmir)
Pondicherry Ashok Hotel Corporation	2017	Government of Puducherry (transferred ownership to the Government of Puducherry)
Mangalore Refinery & Petrochemicals	2018	merged with HPCL
Dredging Corporation of India	2018	Broken up among four ports: Vishakhapatnam Port Trust, Paradeep Port Trust, Jawaharlal Nehru Port Trust and Kandla Port Trust
HSCC	2018	acquired by NBCC
Rural Electrification Corporation Limited	2018	acquired by Power Finance Corporation
Hindustan Petroleum Corporation Limited	2018	acquired by Oil and Natural Gas Corporation (ONGC)
Kamarajar Port	2019	acquired by Chennai Port Trust
North Eastern Electric Power Corporation Limited (NEEPCO)	2020	acquired by NTPC Limited
Tehri Hydro Development Corporation	2020	acquired by NTPC Limited (74.23%), Government of Uttarakhand (25.77%)
Mahanagar Telephone Nigam Limited (MTNL)	2020	acquired by Bharat Sanchar Nigam Limited (BSNL)
Hindustan Newsprint	2020	Government of Kerala (transferred ownership to the Government of Kerala)
Ranchi Ashok Bihar Hotel Corporation	2020	Government of Jharkhand (transferred ownership to the Government of Jharkhand)
Jammu Ashok Hotel Corporation	2020	Government of Jammu and Kashmir (transferred ownership to the Government of Jammu and Kashmir)

== Table ==
Year .	Total Receipts (Rs. Crore)	Inflation Adjusted Total receipts (In 2019 Rupees)
1991–92	3,037	18,743
1992–93	1,912	10,926
1993–94	0	0
1994–95	4,843	23,271
1995–96	168	735
1996–97	379	1504
1997–98	910	3,397
1998–99	5,371	17,386
1999–00	1,860	5,993
2000–01	1,871	5,825
2001–02	5,657	16,750
2002–03	3,347	9,634
2003–04	15,547	43,006
2004–05	2,764	7,367
2005–06	1,569	3,961
2006–07	0	0
2007–08	4,181	9,392
2008–09	0	0
2009–10	23,552	41,948
2010–11	22,144	36,029
2011–12	13,894	21,229
2012–13	23,956	32,925
2013–14	15,819	19,987
2014–15	24,348	28,967
2015–16	23,996	26,851
2016–17	46,247	50,620
2017–18	1,00,056	1,05,303
2018–19	84,972	84,972
2019–20	50,299	45,804.9
2020–21	32,845	29,619
2021–22	13,531	12,220
2022–23	35,293	30,099
2023–24	16,507	13,337
2024–25	10,163	7,911
2025-26	16,885.6	12,786

Total Sum Till 2017–18 ₹ 3,47,439

== See also ==
- Dirigisme
- Public sector undertakings in India
- List of public sector undertakings in India
- Public sector banks in India
- Banking in India
- Five-Year Plans of India
