= U. C. Chaturvedi =

Indian virologist (1939–2021)

- Born: 2 March 1939; Unnao, Uttar Pradesh, India
- Died: 28 December 2021 (aged 82); Lucknow, India
- Education: Government Inter College, Etawah; King George's Medical University; National Institute of Virology
- Known for: Studies on Dengue virus infection
- Awards: ICMR Shakuntala Amirchand Prize (1969); ICMR J. B. Srivastava Award (1979); Shanti Swarup Bhatnagar Prize (1981); KGMU Best Teacher Award (1989); NII Senior Scientist Award (1990); Om Prakash Bhasin Award (1991)
- Scientific career
- Fields: Virology; Immunology; Medical microbiology
- Workplaces: King George's Medical University; Indian Institute of Toxicology Research; Bharat Immunologicals and Biologicals Corporation; Kuwait University
- Doctoral advisor: T. Ramchandra Rao; Thomas Henry Flewett; Peter Wildy; F. Lehmann-grube

Umesh Chandra Chaturvedi (2 March 1939 – 28 December 2021) was an Indian virologist, immunologist, medical microbiologist, CSIR Emeritus Scientist and a former chairman of the Bharat Immunologicals and Biologicals Corporation. The founder head of the department of microbiology at King George's Medical University, he is known for his studies on Dengue virus infection. Chaturvedi is an elected fellow of all the three major Indian science academies viz. Indian Academy of Sciences, National Academy of Sciences, India and the Indian National Science Academy (Note: Long link - please click on name to see details) as well as the Royal College of Pathologists and National Academy of Medical Sciences. The Council of Scientific and Industrial Research, the apex agency of the Government of India for scientific research, awarded him the Shanti Swarup Bhatnagar Prize for Science and Technology, one of the highest Indian science awards for his contributions to Medical Sciences in 1981. (Note: Long link - please select award year to see details)

== Biography ==
U. C. Chaturvedi, born on 2 March 1939 at the Unnao, an industrial city in the Indian state of Uttar Pradesh to Chandra and Satya Prakash Chaturvedi, completed his early college education at Government Inter College, Etawah in 1956, before graduating in medicine from King George's Medical University (then known as King George's Medical College) in 1961. Subsequently, he joined KGMU as a research assistant cum demonstrator and became a full faculty member in 1964. During this time, he pursued his higher studies at the institution and earned an MD in Pathology and Bacteriology in 1965. He spent the rest of his regular career at KGMU till his superannuation in 1999 during which time he rose through ranks holding the positions of a lecturer (1964–65 and 1967), reader (1967–84) and a professor (1984–99). In between, he took a sabbatical during 1965 to 1967 and worked as an ICMR Senior Research Fellow at National Institute of Virology under the guidance of T. Ramchandra Rao, as a Senior Medical Commonwealth Fellow with Thomas Henry Flewett and Peter Wildy at University of Birmingham and as an Alexander von Humboldt Fellow at the laboratory of F. Lehmann-Grube at University of Hamburg. Post-retirement, he served at the Faculty of Medicine of Kuwait University and on his return to India, became associated with Indian Institute of Toxicology Research (then known as Industrial Toxicology Research Centre) in Lucknow where he continued his researches as an emeritus scientist of the Council of Scientific and Industrial Research. Subsequently, he chaired Bharat Immunologicals and Biologicals Corporation, (BIBCOL) a Government of India undertaking involved in the manufacture of oral Polio vaccines, Zinc tablets and kits for the management of Diarrhea. He served BIBCOL till 2006 when he was succeeded by Virander Singh Chauhan.

Chaturvedi is married to Uma and the couple has two daughters, Preeti and Pratibha and a son, Jai Deep. The family lives in Lucknow in Uttar Pradesh.

== Legacy ==
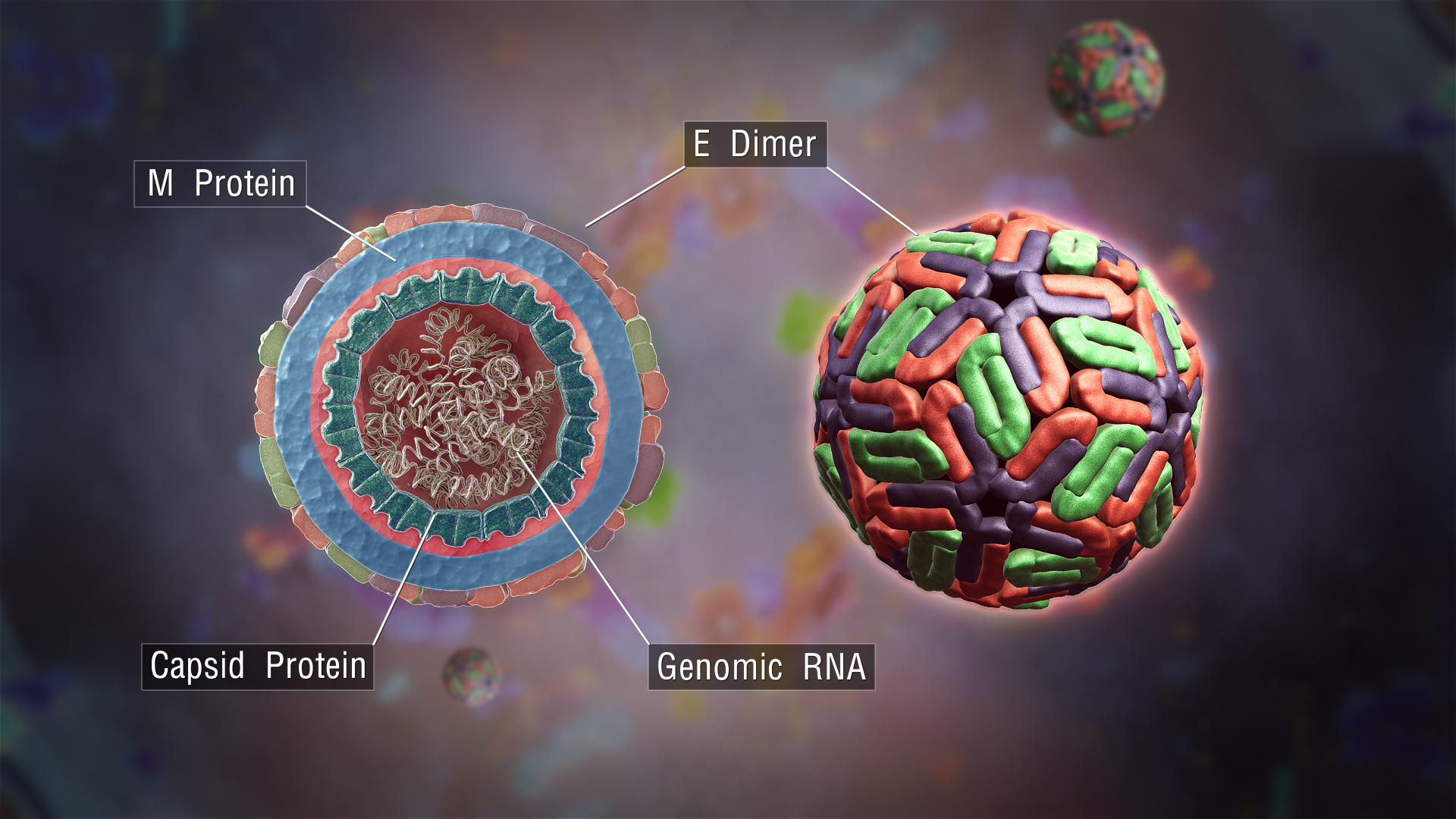
Dengue virus

Dengue fever symptoms

Chaturvedi's early researches spanned the pathogenesis of various diseases which he carried out using animal models and subsequently reconfirming them by clinical trials. The human disorders he covered included chromium toxicity, immunological cardiac injury and dengue haemorrhagic fever (DHF) and it was during this time, he demonstrated that T-lymphocytes could inflict damage on heart tissues thereby leading to post-myocardial infarction and the postpericardiotomy syndrome. When an epidemic of dengue broke out in Kanpur in 1968, the team led by him carried out extensive studies independently and were successful in isolating dengue virus from the patients for further investigations. With the help of his studies on the pathogenesis of Dengue fever, he demonstrated that T helper cell-Type II cytokine receptor causes severity of the disease and he termed the incidence as Cytokine Tsunami, as revealed in articles and an editorial written by him in Indian Journal of Medical Research.

Chaturvedi elucidated the pathogenesis of dengue fever by proposing how virus-infected macrophages incited cytotoxic factor (CF) production in CD4+ T cells which accelerated production of free radicals, nitrite, reactive oxygen and peroxynitrite. He developed an in-vitro model for testing metal toxicity and prescribed pre-treatment protocols using chromium picolinate which countered the incidence of thrombocytopenia induced by the virus. His studies have widened the understanding of Dengue Haemorrhagic Fever and associated Shock Syndrome. He has documented his researches by way of over 255 articles in per-reviewed journals (Note: Please see Selected bibliography section) and the online article repository of the Indian Academy of Sciences has listed 216 of them. Besides, he has contributed chapters to books published by others and his work has been cited by a number of authors and researchers. He has also delivered invited or keynote speeches and has guided a number of master's and doctoral scholars in their studies.

On the academic front, he was the founder head of the Department of Microbiology at King George Medical College and his contributions have been reported in the establishment of a viral diagnostic laboratory at Aligarh Muslim University. He has been associated with many Government of India agencies such as Indian Council of Medical Research, Department of Science and Technology, Department of Biotechnology and the Council of Scientific and Industrial Research and sat in the Scientific Advisory Committee of the National AIDS Research Institute during 2003–04. He has been a member of the Task Force on Infectious Disease Biology of the Department of Biotechnology and represented India in the General Assembly of the International Federation of Tropical Medicine during 1984–85. He sat in the council of the Indian Immunology Society (1992–94) and was the secretary of the Indian Association Medical Microbiologists for three terms (1983, 84 and 1985). He held the position of a treasurer of the Indian Association of Pathologists and Microbiologists from 1976 to 1980 and served as its president in 1988. He has also served as a member of the editorial boards of African Journal of Clinical and Experimental Immunology, Indian Journal of Medical Research and the Indian Journal of Medical Microbiology and has served as the peer reviewer of Dengue Bulletin, published by the South-East Asia Regional Office (SEARO) of the World Health Organization.

Chaturvedi died on 28 December 2021, at the age of 82.

== Awards and honors ==
Chaturvedi received the Shakuntala Amirchand Prize for the young scientists from the Indian Council of Medical Research in 1969; ICMR honored him again a decade later with the 1979 J. B. Srivastava Award. The Council of Scientific and Industrial Research awarded him Shanti Swarup Bhatnagar Prize, one of the highest Indian science awards in 1981. He received the Best Teacher Award of the King George Medical University in 1989 and the Senior Scientist Award of the National Institute of Immunology a year later, followed by the Om Prakash Bhasin Award in 1991.

The National Academy of Medical Sciences elected him as a fellow in 1983 and three years later, he became a fellow of the Indian Academy of Sciences. The year 1987 brought him two elected fellowships; that of the Indian National Science Academy and the National Academy of Sciences, India. He is also a fellow of the Royal College of Pathologists (1986), American Academy of Microbiologists (1988) and the International Medical Sciences Academy. The award orations delivered by him include B. K. Aikat Oration Award by Indian Association of Pathologists and Microbiologists in 1989 and T. S. Tirumurti Award lecture of the Indian National Science Academy in 2007.

== Selected bibliography ==
=== Chapters ===
- Indian Journal of Experimental Biology. Council of Scientific & Industrial Research. 1997.
- H. Hugh Fudenberg (6 December 2012). Immunomodulation: New Frontiers and Advances. Springer Science & Business Media. pp. 193–. ISBN 978-1-4615-9358-4.
- Sondra Schlesinger; Milton J. Schlesinger (9 March 2013). The Togaviridae and Flaviviridae. Springer Science & Business Media. pp. 426–. ISBN 978-1-4757-0785-4.
- Rafael Elias Marques; Rodrigo Guabiraba; Daniel Cisalpino, Mauro M. Teixeira (1 February 2014). Dengue. Biota Publishing. pp. 85–. ISBN 978-1-61504-575-4.

=== Articles ===
- Shrivastava, Richa; Upreti, R. K.; Seth, P. K.; Chaturvedi, U. C (2002). "Effects of chromium on the immune system". FEMS Immunology & Medical Microbiology. 34 (1): 1–7. doi:10.1111/j.1574-695X.2002.tb00596.x. PMID 12208600.
- Chaturvedi, Umesh C.; Shrivastava, Richa (2005). "Interaction of viral proteins with metal ions: role in maintaining the structure and functions of viruses". FEMS Immunology & Medical Microbiology. 43 (2): 105–114. doi:10.1016/j.femsim.2004.11.004. PMC 7110337. PMID 15681139.
- Chaturvedi, Umesh C.; Nagar, Rachna; Shrivastava, Richa (2006). "Dengue and dengue haemorrhagic fever: implications of host genetics". FEMS Immunology & Medical Microbiology. 47 (2): 155–166. doi:10.1111/j.1574-695X.2006.00058.x. PMID 16831202.
- Atanu Basu, Umesh C. Chaturvedi (June 2008). "Vascular endothelium: the battlefield of dengue viruses". FEMS Immunology & Medical Microbiology. 53 (3): 287–299. doi:10.1111/j.1574-695X.2008.00420.x. PMC 7110366. PMID 18522648.
- U. C. Chaturvedi (January 2009). "Shift to Th2 cytokine response in dengue haemorrhagic fever". Indian Journal of Medical Research. 129 (1): 1–3. PMID 19287050.
- Umesh C. Chaturvedi, Rachna Nagar (February 2009). "Nitric oxide in dengue and dengue haemorrhagic fever: necessity or nuisance?". Pathogens and Disease. 56 (1): 9–24. doi:10.1111/j.1574-695X.2009.00544.x. PMC 7110348. PMID 19239490.
- Nivedita Gupta, U.C. Chaturvedi (July 2009). "Can helper T-17 cells play a role in dengue haemorrhagic fever?" (PDF). Indian J Med Res. 130 (1): 5–8. PMID 19700793.

== See also ==
- Cytotoxic necrotising factor family
- Dengue vaccine
