= Ashok Hotel =

5-star hotel in Chanakyapuri, New Delhi

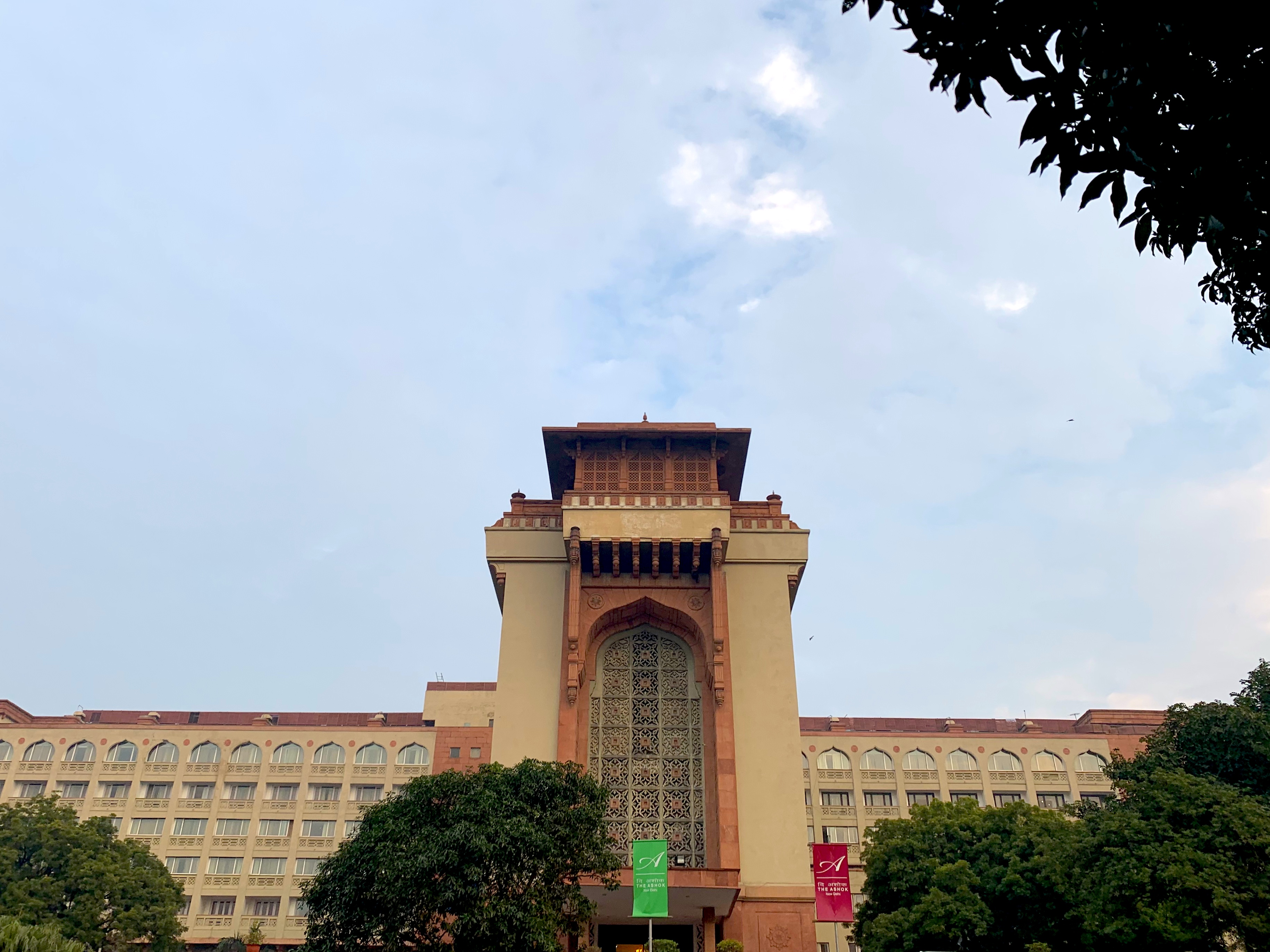
- The front facade of the hotel.

General information
- Location: Diplomatic Enclave, 50-B; Chanakyapuri, New Delhi
- Opening: 1956
- Owner: Government of India
- Operator: ITDC

Technical details
- Floor count: 7

Design and construction
- Architect: E.B. Doctor

Other information
- Number of rooms: 550

Website
- https://itdc.co.in/hotels/the-ashok/

The Ashok Hotel is a five-star deluxe resort in the 50, Niti Marg, Diplomatic enclave of Chanakyapuri, New Delhi. This hotel is part of the Ashok Group, owned by the India Tourism Development Corporation.

== Description ==
The hotel has 550 guest rooms and houses the largest pillar-less convention hall in New Delhi, where the iconic Dehlvi family hosted the Shama-Sushama Film Awards every year through the mid-twentieth century. Situated in the Chanakyapuri diplomatic enclave, it neighbors the official residence of the prime minister of India and the British High Commission. It has hosted several royals and heads of state, including Queen Elizabeth II, Prince Aga Khan, Pasha Party, Tito, Margaret Thatcher, President Bill Clinton, Che Guevara, and Fidel Castro. The presidential suite was used for three years as the official residence of the Saudi Arabian ambassador.

The hotel is owned by ITDC, of which the Government of India owns an 87.03% stake. The hotel is named after emperor Ashoka The Great, who had conquered almost the entirety of the Indian subcontinent from c. 268 to 232 BCE.

== History ==
The Ashok was built in 1956 by the first Prime Minister of India, Jawaharlal Nehru, on 25 acres of parkland donated to the government by the Prince Regent of Jammu and Kashmir, Karan Singh, and designed by the Parsi Indian architect E.B. Doctor. It is an Indo-Modernist architectural style landmark and was completed in 1956 to host world leaders and dignitaries for the ninth UNESCO conference held in New Delhi. Of the original 23 shareholders, 15 were rulers of princely states that had been recently merged into India, including the Maharaja of Nawanagar.

In 1968, Prime Minister Indira Gandhi hosted a large banquet at the Ashok Hotel to celebrate her son Rajiv's wedding to Sonia.

In July 1971, the hotel hosted American National Security Advisor Henry Kissinger for a lunch meeting with Vikram Sarabhai and P. N. Haksar.

In the 1980s, film actor Shah Rukh Khan was known to frequent the hotel during the fledgling part of his career. It served as the location for the 1989 Yash Chopra movie Chandni.

In the 1970s, Ashok hosted one of the first nightclubs in New Delhi, called the Supper Club. Usha Uthup, Sharon Prabhakar, Hema Malini, and Uday Shankar all performed at the venue prior to attaining stardom, and a notable scene from Laawaris (1981) starring Amitabh Bachchan was shot there.

The Ashok Hotel received LEED Gold certification for Building Operations and Maintenance in 2017.

In May 2019, immediately after the Indian General elections and before forming his next government, Prime Minister Narendra Modi hosted a dinner chaired by Amit Shah at the hotel for leaders of their NDA coalition. Those in attendance included Shiv Sena leader Uddhav Thackeray, Akal Dal leader Prakash Singh Badal, JD(U) leader Nitish Kumar, union ministers Rajnath Singh and Nitin Gadkari.
