= Mugdha Sinha =

Indian civil servant

Managing Director, India Tourism Development Corporation

Personal details
- Education: Jawahar Lal Nehru University, New Delhi
- Occupation: Civil servant

Mugdha Sinha is an officer of the Indian Administrative Service (IAS), 1999 batch, of the Rajasthan cadre. She currently serves as the Managing Director of the India Tourism Development Corporation (ITDC) at the rank of Additional Secretary to the Government of India.

== Education ==
She studied at University of Delhi, Jawaharlal Nehru University, Lady Shri Ram College, and the Goldman School of Public Policy at the University of California, Berkeley. She is a published poet and has been associated with literary and cultural pursuits.

== Career ==
Mugdha Sinha joined the Indian Administrative Service in 1999 and was allotted the Rajasthan cadre. She has held several senior administrative positions during her career in the Indian civil services. She served as Joint Secretary in the Ministry of Culture, Government of India, where she was associated with cultural policy and administrative responsibilities.

She later served as Director General of Tourism in the Ministry of Tourism, Government of India, contributing to national tourism planning and initiatives.

In April 2025, she was promoted to the rank of Additional Secretary and appointed Managing Director of the India Tourism Development Corporation (ITDC), a public sector undertaking under the Ministry of Tourism.

== Personal life ==
She lost her husband, Nirmal Wadhwani, in an accident in 2002, when he was 31 years old.
