= Shama (magazine) =

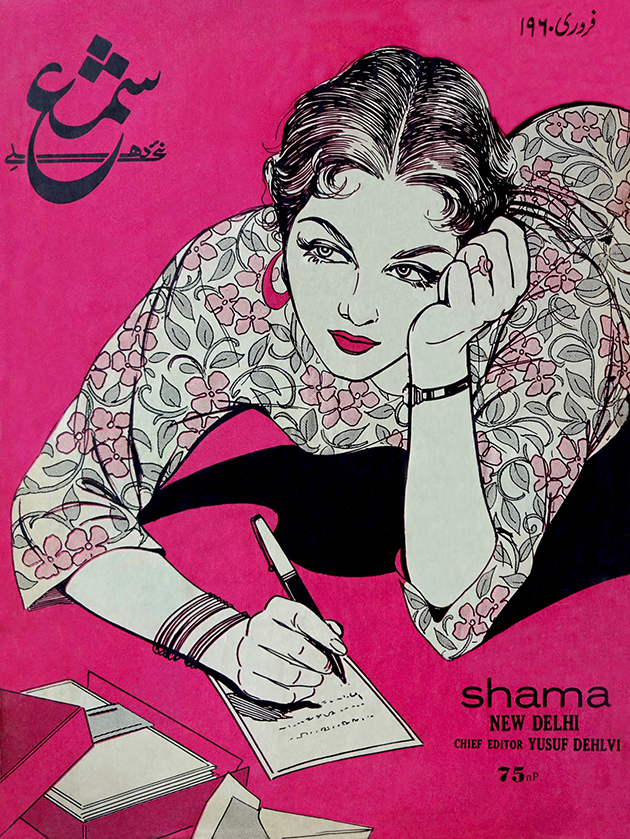
- Cover of a 1960 issue
- Editor: Yusuf Dehlvi (1939-1985), Idrees Dehlvi, Ilyas Dehlvi (1985-1999)
- Categories: Literary magazine
- Frequency: Monthly
- Founder: Yusuf Dehlvi
- Founded: 1939
- Final issue: 1999
- Country: India
- Language: Urdu

Shama was a monthly Indian Urdu-language film and literary magazine published from 1939 to 1999. Considered the world's biggest chain of Urdu-language magazines at the time, the Shama group published several other famous magazines and digests including Sushama (Hindi), Khilauna, Dost aur Dosti, Bano, Sushmita, Mujrim, Doshi, A'inah, Shabistan and Rasia Kashidakari. The magazine was a household name and has been described as a "movement of Urdu which gave birth to a new tradition".

Three generations of the Dehlvi family were involved in Shama empire's management beginning from its founder Yusuf Dehlvi, his three sons Younus, Idrees and Ilyas Dehlvi as well as some of their wives and children who also frequently contributed articles for the monthlies.

At the time when the Shama group was at its zenith, the Dehlvi family was reckoned as one of the wealthiest and most influential in India, and its links to the Urdu-Hindi film industry as well as their political and literary connections earned them celebrity status.

Shama was the first monthly Indian journal of any kind in any language to surpass the 100,000-subscribers milestone, which it did as early as 1949. Its peak circulation is unknown since the company's financial records did not survive the closing of the Shama office in 1999. The magazine's early commercial success led to a number of spin-off publications under the Shama umbrella.

== History ==
Shama (Urdu: شمع, romanized: Śamā, lit. 'Candle') was started in September 1939 by Delhi-based businessman Yusuf Dehlvi. It was initially sold for two annas per copy. Following the format of some other Urdu film magazines like Chitra, Shama's content was a combination of film and literary writing which was partly the reason for its wide circulation. The magazine was not an instant success but Dehlvi managed to sustain it even in tumultuous times, and the magazine eventually became a credible name. The partition of British India brought many Urdu readers to India which gave a boost to the magazine's readership. Dehlvi was joined by his three sons, Idrees, Ilyas and Yunus, when the magazine started to hit the jackpot.

=== Popularity ===
Shama became the first Urdu magazine to reach a circulation of one lakh copies a month and special flights were booked for transporting the magazine overseas. It featured popular Urdu writers and poets like Arzoo Lakhnavi, Firaq Gorakhpuri, Ismat Chughtai, Krishan Chander, Jigar Moradabadi and regularly featured columns by those associated with the film industry. Actor Sanjay Dutt's name was chosen by crowdsourcing through Shama and it was reported by the magazine that Nargis would send an autographed picture and a personal letter to the person who had suggested the name. After the death of actress Meena Kumari, Nargis wrote a personal essay in Shama in June 1972.

The magazine carried condolence messages from President Giani Zail Singh and Prime Minister Rajiv Gandhi upon the death of founder Yusuf Dehlvi in 1985. In a 1985 issue, actor Dharmendra wrote that his desire to get into films was aroused by Shama. A popular feature of the magazine was its literary crosswords called 'Adabi Muamma' which carried attractive prizes worth lakhs of rupees. The magazine carried a column 'Sitaaron Ki Duniya' (World of the stars) written by Idrees Dehlvi under the pseudonym 'Musafir', which gave access to the lives of actors and filmmaking, but avoided salacious content.

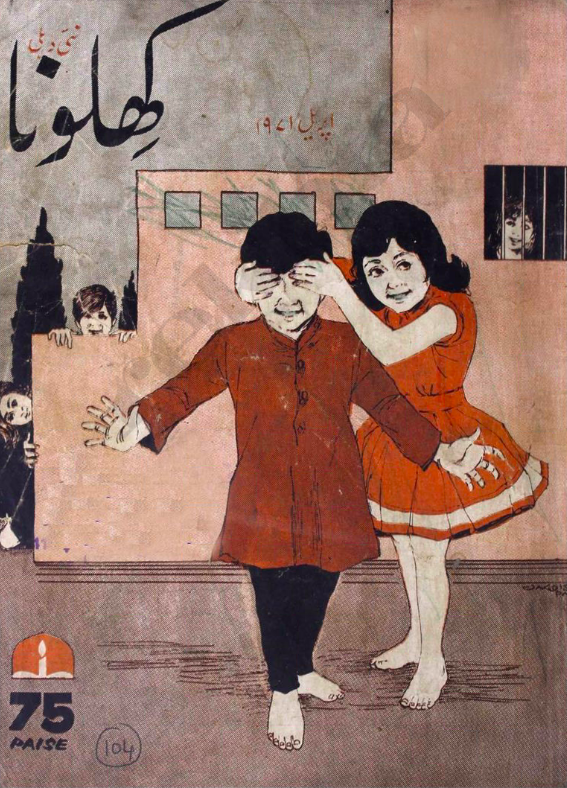
Cover of a 1971 issue of Khilauna Magazine by the Shama Group

== Spin-off publications ==
Following the success of Shama, in the early 1950s, Yusuf Dehlvi acquired Bano and used the Shama name to leverage it into India's premiere women's magazine. Bano contained content similar to the nineteenth century magazines, a mixture of practical knowledge and literature, but without Shama's film focus and the risqué image.

At around the same time, the children's magazine Khilauna (meaning Toy) was launched. Unlike the moralistic children's magazines from the nineteenth century, Khilauna treated its young readers as friends, and the magazine was meant to be played with, not merely read. It published fiction and informational articles drawn from cosmopolitan sources, as well as baby pictures submitted by readers. Barely out of college, Khilauna editor Yusuf's youngest son, Ilyas Dehlvi, enlisted highly reputed writers like Ḳhvajah Aḥmad Abbas, Krishan Chandar and Rajindar Singh Bedī to contribute children's stories. Khilauna also contained illustrated serialized comic strips which contained some of India's first homegrown fantasy and science fiction for children.

As Urdu readership slowly declined through the 1960s, the Dehlvis launched a Hindi version of Shama, called Sushama (meaning Splendour). The name was chosen because of the phonemic similarity with the name of the parent magazine. An Urdu-language crime/spy magazine 'Mujrim' was also launched along with its Hindi-language counterpart 'Doshi.'

During the 80s, Ilyas Dehlvi, on observing his daughter Rasia Dehlvi's interest in fashion and the art of embroidery, launched Rasia Kashidakari, another successful venture deviating from Shama's literary and film focus. Several magazines were patterned after successful American magazines, including A'inah (meaning Mirror) and Shabistan (meaning Bedroom).

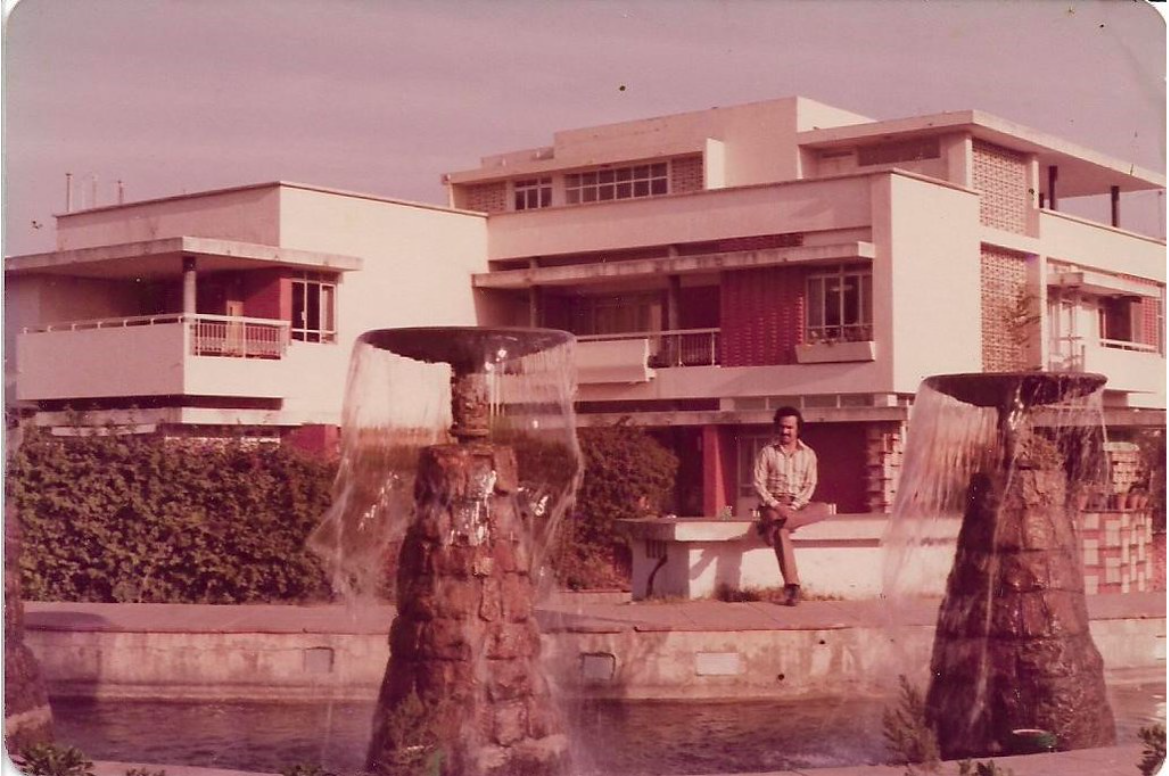
The Shama Mansion, the iconic private residence of the Dehlvi family, in its glory in Delhi's diplomatic enclave

== Shama-Sushama Film Awards ==
Owing to Shama's increasingly close association with the Hindi and Urdu Film fraternity, the Dehlvis hosted the Shama-Sushama Film Awards, one of the most awaited and talked-about annual events in the country at the time. The annual award function saw some of the biggest film, literary, political and business personalities in attendance. The event was traditionally held at the Ashok Hotel situated about next-door to the Shama Mansion, the iconic residence of the Dehlvis in Lutyens' Delhi. The first ceremony happened on 11 March 1973.
