= Bharat Immunologicals and Biologicals Corporation =

Indian public sector company

- Type: Public Sector Undertaking
- Traded as: BSE: 524663
- Defunct: December 2022
- Fate: Closure
- Key people: Smt.Ekta Vishnoi , IRS (Managing Director)
- Products: Polio vaccine
- Owner: Government of India

Bharat Immunologicals and Biologicals Corporation Limited (BIBCOL) is a Public Sector Undertaking (PSU) of the Government of India. Established in 1989 in Bulandshahar, Uttar Pradesh, BIBCOL manufactures oral polio vaccines (OPVs) and other immunisers. The company formulates over 12.5 crore doses of OPV and had aggregated revenues of ₹30.5 crore (equivalent to ₹107 crore or US$11 million in 2026) in fiscal 2006.

BIBCOL is under the administrative control of the Department of Biotechnology, Ministry of Science and Technology.

BIBCOL was approved for closure by government in 2024.

== History ==
Bharat Immunologicals and Biologicals Corporation (BIBCOL) was incorporated on 10 March 1989 as a public sector undertaking under the Companies Act, 1956. The company was established by the Government of India through the Department of Biotechnology, under the Ministry of Science and Technology, to manufacture Oral polio vaccine (OPV) for use in India's national immunisation programme and to support efforts to eradicate Poliomyelitis.

In 1999, the company obtained World Health Organization Good Manufacturing Practices (WHO-GMP) certification for its production facilities. In the early 2000s, BIBCOL received large supply orders for oral polio vaccines from organizations such as the Ministry of Health and Family Welfare and the United Nations Children's Fund (UNICEF).

During the COVID-19 pandemic, the Government of India selected BIBCOL as one of several public sector manufacturers to expand production of Covaxin, a COVID-19 vaccine developed by Bharat Biotech. The company undertook upgrades to its manufacturing facility in Bulandshahr, Uttar Pradesh, including the development of biosafety infrastructure required for vaccine production.

== Products ==
1. Diarrhea Management Kit—Diarrhea Management Kit (Zinc Tablet + oral rehydration salts (ORS)) for management of diarrhea among young children.
2. Oral Polio Vaccine—The live oral polio vaccine (OPV) is a trivalent vaccine containing suspensions of type 1, 2, and 3 attenuated poliomyelitis viruses (Sabin strains) prepared in primary by monkey kidney cell culture.
3. Zinc Dispersible Tablet—The dispersible zinc tablet, BIBZinC-20 mg contains 20 mg of elemental zinc as the active ingredient and contains a sweetener and taste masker (Vanilla flavor) and is a scored tablet. The product is in line with the recommendations of the WHO. The product is produced with technology transfer from Nutriset through the Department of Biotechnology, Ministry of Science and Technology, Government of India. The Nutriset product has been tested in Indian fields, and clinical trials have evaluated the efficacy of zinc supplementation and safety.
4. IFA Tablets—Iron-deficiency anemia (IDA) is most ignored in developing countries and is the major cause of anemia. The Iron Folic Tablets (IFA Tablets) are a crucial component for the treatment of iron deficiency and IDA.

== See also ==
- U. C. Chaturvedi
