= National Safai Karamcharis Finance and Development Corporation =

National Safai Karamcharis Finance and Development Corporation (NSKFDC) was set up in January 1997 as a non profit company under Ministry of Social Justice and Empowerment, Government of India to empower the Manual Scavengers, Safai Karamcharis and their dependents to break away their traditional occupation, depressed social condition and poverty and leverage them to work their own way up the social and economic ladder with dignity and pride. Its head office is currently located in Greater Kailash Enclave Part-II, New Delhi.
