= Balmer Lawrie =

Central Public Sector Undertaking

- Balmer Lawrie Logo

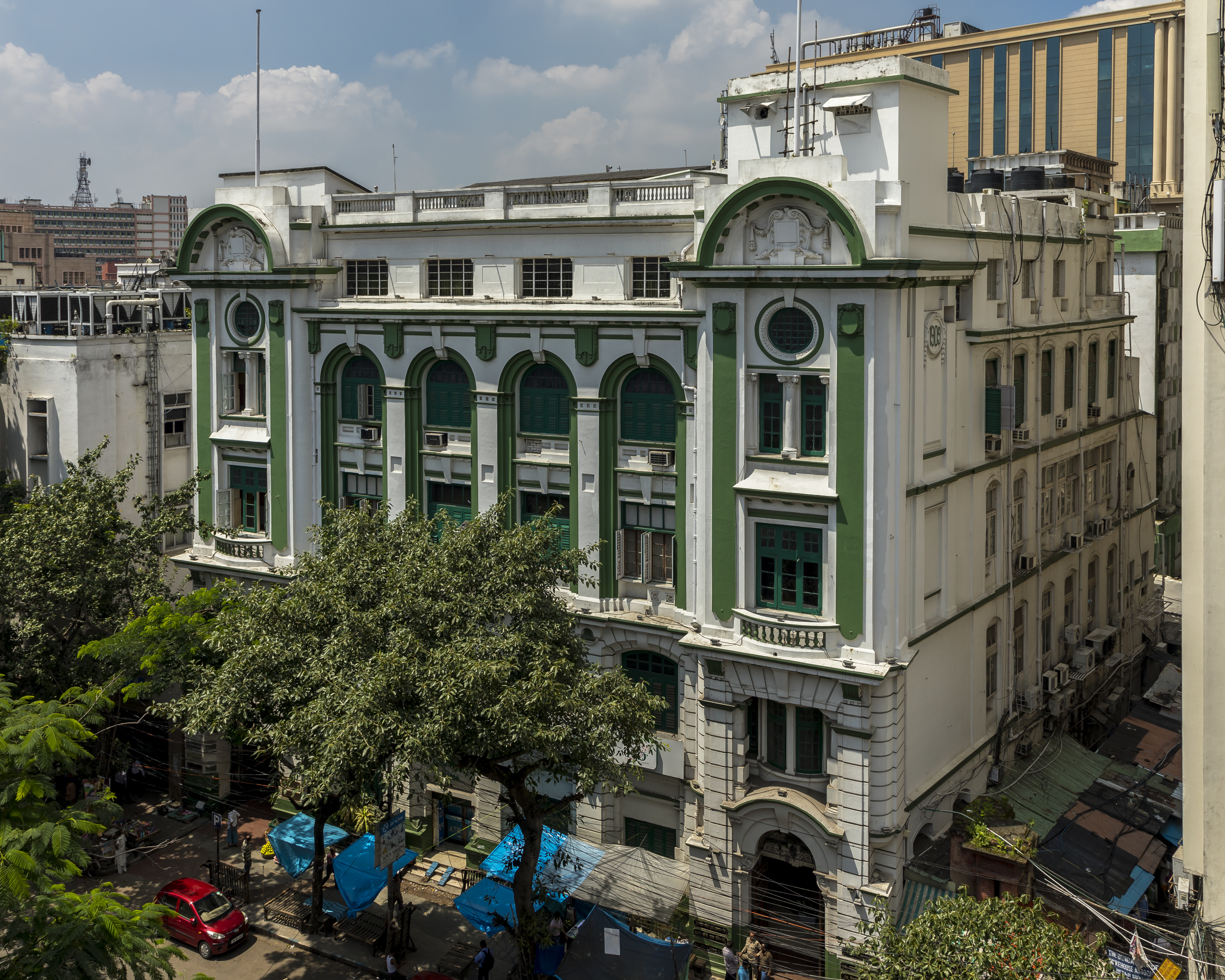
- Balmer Lawrie headquarters in Kolkata
- Type: Public Sector Undertaking
- Traded as: BSE: 523319; NSE: BALMLAWRIE
- Industry: Steel; Lubricants; Travel; Logistics
- Founded: (1867; 159 years ago) in Calcutta, British India
- Founder: Stephen George Balmer; Alexander Lawrie
- Headquarters: Kolkata, India
- Key people: Adhip Nath Palchaudhuri (Chairman & Managing Director)
- Owner: Government of India
- Parent: Ministry of Petroleum and Natural Gas, Government of India
- Subsidiaries: Visakhapatnam Port Logistics Park Limited
- Website: www.balmerlawrie.com

Balmer Lawrie & Co. Ltd. (BL) is an Indian central public sector undertaking and a conglomerate under the Ministry of Petroleum and Natural Gas, Government of India. It is classified as a category-I Miniratna company. Originally founded in 1867 by George Stephen Balmer and Alexander Lawrie in Calcutta, British India, the conglomerate has eight strategic business units, four joint ventures in India and abroad, and a subsidiary in India.

Balmer Lawrie at 9th Bengaluru Space Expo 2026, BIEC

== History ==
Balmer Lawrie was founded as a partnership firm on 1 February 1867 in Calcutta, British India, by two Scotsmen: George Stephen Balmer and Alexander Lawrie. It became a private limited company in 1924 with a paid-up share capital of ₹40 lakhs, a public limited company in 1936 and then a Government of India Enterprise in 1972. BL is classified as a category-I Miniratna company.

== Joint ventures and subsidiary ==
Balmer Lawrie has joint ventures in both India and abroad and a subsidiary in India.

=== Joint Ventures in India ===
- Balmer Lawrie - Van Leer Ltd.
- AVI-OIL India Pvt. Ltd.

=== Joint Ventures abroad ===
- PT. Balmer Lawrie Indonesia
- Balmer Lawrie (UAE) LLC

=== Subsidiary ===
- Visakhapatnam Port Logistics Park Limited

== Service ==
It has eight strategic business units: Industrial Packaging, Greases & Lubricants, Chemicals, Travel & Vacations, Logistics Infrastructure, Logistics Services, Cold Chain and Refinery & Oil Field Services, with offices spread across the country and abroad. BL is present in eight businesses: Travel and Vacations, Industrial Packaging, Greases and Lubricants, Leather Chemicals, Logistics, Logistics Infrastructure, Logistics Services, and Refinery and Oil Field.

== Recent developments ==
Today, Balmer Lawrie is a government sector enterprise with a turnover of ₹2,404 crores and a profit of ₹203 crores as of 31 March 2025. During FY 2024–25, the PSE earned a revenue of ₹2,404 crore (US$250 million).
