= Bokaro =

Bokaro may refer to:

- Bokaro district, in Jharkhand, India
  - Bokaro Steel City, an industrial city
  - Bokaro (Thermal), a census town
    - Bokaro Thermal Power Station B
  - Bokaro Assembly constituency
- Bokaro River, a river in the Indian state of Jharkhand

== See also ==
- East Bokaro Coalfield
- West Bokaro Coalfield
