= National Handicapped Finance and Development Corporation =

Indian non-profit organization

National Handicapped Finance and Development Corporation (NHFDC) was set up in January 1997 as a not for profit company under Ministry of Social Justice and Empowerment, Government of India. The corporation provides financial assistance for wide range of income generating activities to disabled persons.

The company is managed by Board of Directors nominated by Government of India.
