= India Tourism Development Corporation =

A public sector Indian company

India Tourism Development Corporation Ltd.
- Type: Public
- Traded as: BSE: 532189; NSE: ITDC
- Founded: 1 October 1966
- Headquarters: New Delhi, India
- Key people: Sambit Patra (Chairman); Mugdha Sinha (Managing Director)
- Products: Ashok Group Hotels, Duty Free, Travel Solutions, Advertising Solutions, Engineering Consultancy, Education and Training, Event Management, Art Gallery
- Total equity: 75 crores
- Owner: Government of India (87.03%)
- Website: itdc.co.in

The India Tourism Development Corporation (ITDC) is a hospitality, retail and education company owned by the Government of India, under the administration of the Ministry of Tourism. Established in 1966, it currently owns over 4 properties under the Ashok Group of Hotels brand, across India.

One of the hotels the government developed was the Akbar Hotel in Chanakyapuri, which was built from 1965 to 1969. It remained a hotel until the mid-1980's when it was converted into office space. There were plans in 2007 to convert it back into a hotel in time for the 2010 Commonwealth Games.

== List of properties ==
Properties that are operated by the ITDC in 2022 were:

- Ashok Hotel
- Hotel Samrat
- Kalinga Ashok
- Pondicherry Ashok

In 2011 ITDC owned hotels were:

- Hotel Patliputra Ashok, Patna, Bihar
- The Ashok, New Delhi, Delhi
- Samrat Hotel, New Delhi, Delhi
- Janpath Hotel, New Delhi, Delhi
- Hotel Jammu Ashok, Jammu, J&K
- Lalitha Mahal Palace Hotel, Mysore, Karnataka
- Hotel Kalinga Ashok, Bhubaneswar, Odisha
- Hotel Jaipur Ashok, Jaipur, Rajasthan

ITDC managed hotel:

- Hotel Bharatpur Ashok, Bharatpur, Rajasthan

ITDC Joint Venture hotels:

- Hotel Lake View Ashok, Bhopal, Madhya Pradesh
- Hotel Brahmaputra Ashok, Guwahati, Assam
- Hotel Ranchi Ashok, Ranchi, Jharkhand
- Hotel Pondicherry Ashok, Pondicherry, Pondicherry
- Hotel Donyi Polo Ashok, Itanagar, Arunachal Pradesh
- Hotel Nilachal Ashok, Puri, Odisha
