= Central Mine Planning and Design Institute =

Indian public sector undertaking

Coordinates: 23°23′56″N 85°19′03″E

- Trade name: CMPDI
- Formerly: National Coal Development Corporation
- Type: Public Subsidiary
- Traded as: NSE: CMPDI; BSE: 544739
- Industry: Coal exploration
- Founded: 1 November 1975
- Headquarters: Ranchi, Jharkhand, India
- Number of locations: Ranchi, Asansol, Dhanbad, Nagpur, Bilaspur, Singrauli, Bhubaneshwar
- Area served: Global
- Services: Consultancy services on environmental engineering
- Revenue: ₹ 6015 million
- Operating income: ₹ 297.7 million
- Net income: ₹ 250.5 million
- Total assets: ₹ 5458.7 million
- Total equity: ₹ 737.8 million
- Owner: Coal India Limited
- Number of employees: 3,230
- Website: cmpdi.co.in

The Central Mine Planning and Design Institute (CMPDI) is an Indian public sector company which provides coal exploration consulting and mining engineering services. It is a subsidiary of Coal India Limited, a public sector undertaking administered by the Ministry of Coal, Government of India.

== Profile ==
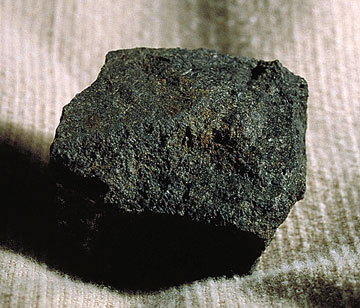
Bituminous coal

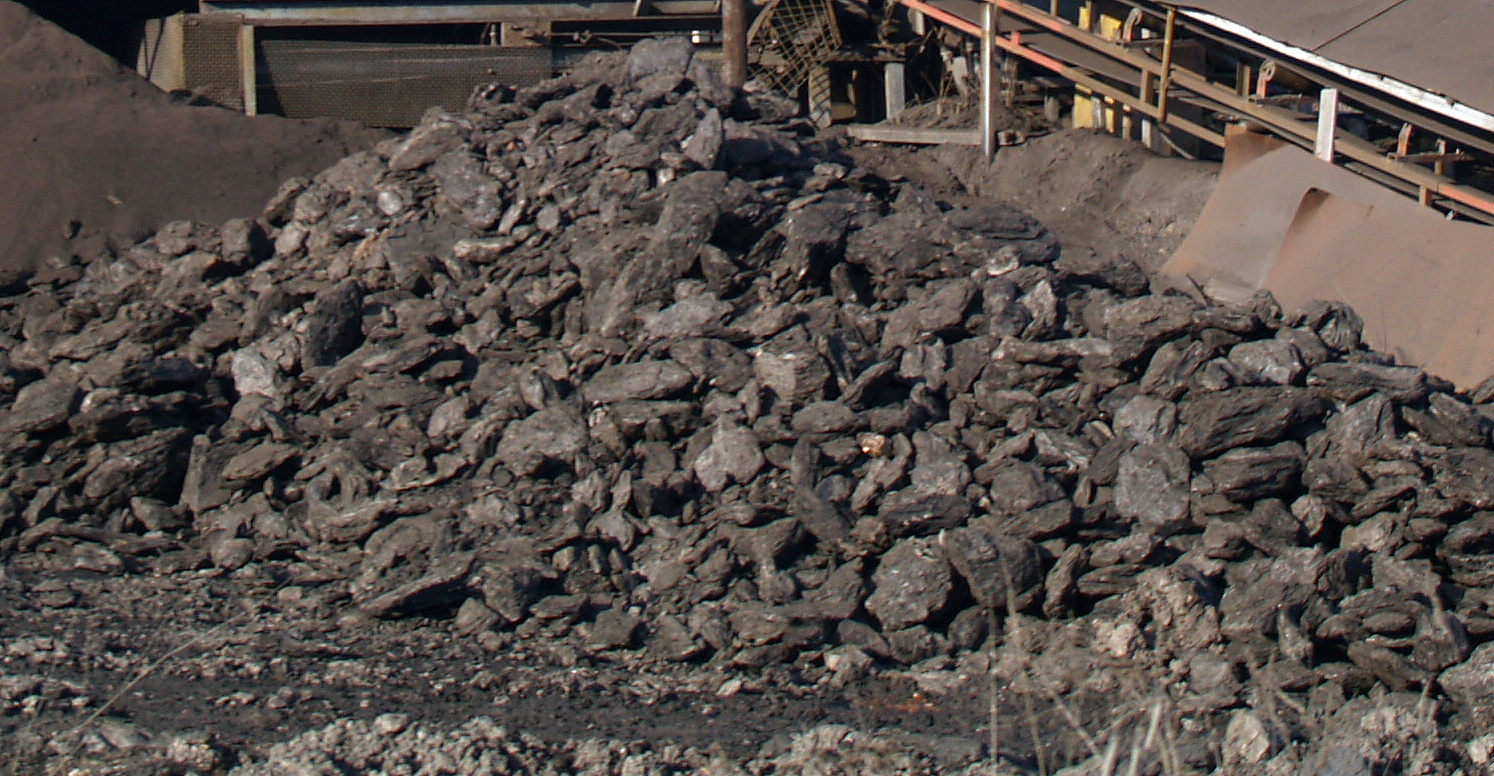
Lignite

The Central Mine Planning and Design Institute Limited was established in 1974, under Coal Mines Authority Limited (CMAL) (former name of Coal India Limited), out of the planning division of the now defunct National Coal Development Corporation (NCDC) as a single window set up to consolidate all aspects of Indian mining industry under one roof. After the nationalisation of coal mining in India, CMPDI was reconstituted as a public sector undertaking in 1975.

The company has its headquarters in Ranchi, Jharkhand, and is involved in mineral exploration, resource evaluation, resource management, mining geology, hydro-geological and geophysical studies, and engineering geology investigations. It is an ISO 9001 accredited company and was rated as a Mini Ratna (Category II) company in 2009.

CMPDI offers consultancy services in the fields of environmental engineering, such as open pit and underground mine planning and design in coal, lignite, and other minerals. The institute is active in geological exploration, geological, geotechnical and allied support, mine planning and design, environmental management, and training services.

CMPDI has regional institutes (RIs) at Asansol, Dhanbad, Ranchi, Nagpur, Bilaspur, Singrauli and Bhubaneswar to extend its coverage nationwide and has various field units and exploration camps.

== Mandate ==
CMPDI has two distinct responsibilities, business and corporate, as per its mandate.

Business functions: Mineral exploration consultancy and support, infrastructure engineering, and environmental management.

Corporate functions: Preparation and upkeep of data on coal inventories, operations and potential, advising the Ministry of Coal and NITI Aayog on coal-related matters, nodal agency functions on behalf of the Government of India in the matters related to mineral exploration, co-ordination activities between related companies in India and research and development in the field of mineral mining.

== Accreditations and collaborations ==
CMPDI has been accredited with ISO-9001 certification by Certification International (UK). It has also entered into memoranda of understanding with many international agencies such as IMCL, UK, Metchem, Canada, Giproshakht, Russia, Mountain Consulting GmbH, Germany, Rheinbraun Engineering, Germany, and DMT, Germany for co-operation in the field of earth resources.

CMPDI acts as a registered consultant to:

- World Bank, Washington
- Asian Development Bank, Manila
- United Nations Development Programme (UNDP)
- National Development Corporation, Tanzania
- Ministry of Mines and Petroleum, Muscat, Sultanate of Oman
- Ministry of Coal Industry, People's Republic of China
- African Development Bank, Abidjan

== Projects ==
Apart from various projects for national agencies in the public and private sectors, CMPDI has also undertaken many international projects.

- National Development Corporation, Tanzania: Total consultancy services for exploration, preparation of pre-feasibility and feasibility study for an open pit mining project and associated thermal power project at Mchuchuma, Tanzania.
- Asian Development Bank, Manila: Feasibility study on Clean Coal Technology jointly accomplished with Mountain – Consulting MbH, Germany.
- United Nations Development Programme (UNDP): Technical and managerial training for North Korea, Oman, Nigeria and Tanzania.
- AMOCO India Petroleum Co, Houston, USA: data generation project on Coal-bed Methane.
- Centre for Coal Utilisation (CCUJ), Japan: consultancy services for Clean Coal Technology.

== Awards and recognitions ==
- Mini Ratna (Category-II) company status in May 2009.
- Highest MoU rating with a Composite MoU Score of 1.0 (maximum) for the year 2009–10.
- Best performing Subsidiary Company of CIL award for the year 2008–09.
- Commendation Certificate of SCOPE Meritorious Award for R&D, Technology Development and Innovation for the year 2009–10.
- Geospatial World Excellence Award 2012, Amsterdam, the Netherlands, for excellent usage of Geospatial technology for land reclamation monitoring of Coal Mines.

== Publications ==
CMPDI publishes a quarterly journal, Minetech – The Indian Mining and Engineering Journal (ISSN 0970-7204), about mining and related subjects, and the Hindi quarterly magazine "Deshkal Sampada".

The institute has also published many other titles.

Title	Title	Title
Coal Combustion	Mine Winders and Winding Systems	Coal Washing – A New Business Opportunity
Coal Atlas of India	Information on Indian Coal	Guidelines for Support Plans
Mine Pumps for Underground Drainage	Do's & Don't's for Belt Conveyors	Do's & Don't's for Crushers
Mine Fans & their use in Mine Ventilation	Electricity in Underground Coal Mines	Environment in Underground Coal Mines
Underground Mines Fire & Explosion	Coal Mine Roof Support	Underground Coal Mining in India
Artificial Recharge and Rainwater Harvesting Techniques		
