= Tyre Corporation of India =

Defunct Indian state-owned tyre manufacturer

Tyre Corporation of India Limited
- Type: Central public sector undertaking
- Industry: Tyre manufacturing
- Predecessors: Inchek Tyres Limited; National Rubber Manufacturers Limited
- Founded: 1984
- Fate: Winding up ordered on 29 November 2013; in liquidation
- Headquarters: Kolkata, India
- Products: Automotive tyres
- Owner: Government of India

Tyre Corporation of India Limited (TCIL) was an Indian government-owned tyre maker with its headquarters in Kolkata. It was set up in 1984 to run Inchek Tyres and National Rubber Manufacturers, two companies the government had nationalised. It was referred to the Board for Industrial and Financial Reconstruction (BIFR) in 1992. Parliament passed an Act in 2007 allowing the government to sell its equity, but attempts to sell the company in 1998 and from 2011 to 2013 failed. The Calcutta High Court ordered it wound up on 29 November 2013.

== History ==
TCIL was incorporated in 1984 to run Inchek Tyres and National Rubber Manufacturers after an Act of Parliament acquired their undertakings. The nationalisation was meant to protect about 4,000 to 4,500 jobs and to ensure a supply of tyres to state transport undertakings, government departments and the defence sector. The company had a tyre plant at Kankinara, an industrial rubber products unit at Tangra and a unit at Kalyani.

The Kankinara plant was modernised and began commercial production in April 1994. Short of working capital, the company stopped producing under its own brand and made tyres for other manufacturers, and from 2002 all of its production was contract work.

TCIL's net worth turned negative in 1992, when it was referred to the BIFR. In 1998 Ceat withdrew from the contest for a stake and Apollo Tyres offered about ₹75 crore for 76 per cent. No sale followed, and the government still owned all of the equity in 2011. The Tangra unit closed in August 2001 and its assets were sold on BIFR directions, with the unit auctioned in 2003 for ₹30 crore.

A 2003 Supreme Court ruling required parliamentary approval before a public sector enterprise could be sold or closed. The Rajya Sabha passed the Tyre Corporation of India Limited (Disinvestment of Ownership) Bill on 3 December 2007, and the resulting Act is dated 12 December 2007.

The Cabinet Committee on Economic Affairs approved an outright sale on 6 November 2008, and a restructuring package cleared the same month waived ₹547.09 crore of interest on government loans. In May 2009 the BIFR asked the government to sell the company's assets before bringing in a partner. The heavy industries secretary said the government wanted to sell it as a going concern, and the sale was held up.

The Department of Heavy Industry proposed a complete sale in July 2011, when TCIL employed about 800 people, most of them on contract. Expressions of interest for all of the equity were invited in July 2012, and three parties responded after the deadline was extended to 10 September. Titagarh Group, Patton and a Ruia group company were shortlisted. After a bidders' meeting on 25 January 2013, the Department of Disinvestment withheld the sale.

The sale was also complicated by a land dispute with West Bengal. The Kalyani unit stood on about 29 acres leased from the state for 999 years. The state opposed the sale and cancelled the lease, saying the unit had not operated since August 1992.
