= Indian Petrochemicals Corporation Limited =

Indian petrochemicals company

- Company type: Public
- Traded as: BSE: 500105; NSE: IPCL
- Industry: Petrochemicals
- Founded: 1965
- Headquarters: Vadodara, Gujarat
- Owner: Government of India
- Number of employees: 13,000
- Website: indianpetrochemicals.com

Indian Petrochemicals Corporation Limited (IPCL) was a petrochemicals company in India. At the time of its disinvestment to Reliance Industries Limited, its turnover for the financial year 2005-06 had crossed the US $2 billion mark.

== History ==
IPCL was established on 22 March 1969, as a Government of India undertaking, with the objective of promoting the development of the petrochemical industry in India. Prime Minister Indira Gandhi, invited Jayant Jyotendra Mehta (who had built the National Rayon plant at Kalyan) to head the IPCL project. Mehta was the founder, Chairman, and Managing Director of IPCL. The Company began construction of its first petrochemicals complex at Vadodara in 1970. Commercial production at the complex commenced in 1973.

By the late 1990s, it held a market share (around 28% in acrylics and polymers) but faced mounting challenges amid economic liberalization. Despite that, the Company’s second petrochemicals complex in Nagothana was commissioned in 1992, and its third complex at Gandhar was commissioned in 1996. In August 1992, the Company’s shares were listed on all the major stock exchanges in India including the Bombay Stock Exchange and the National Stock Exchange of India. It became one of the first state-owned companies to issue equity to Indian investors. In 1994, it became the first government-owned company in India to raise capital in the global markets through a US$85 million global depository receipt Euro-issue.

== Consolidation ==
On 1 April 2005, the six polyester companies namely Appollo Fibres Limited (AFL), Central India Polyesters Limited (CIPL), India Polyfibres Limited (IPL), Orissa Polyfibres Limited (OPL), Recron Synthetics Limited (RSL) and Silvassa Industries Private Limited (SIPL) have been amalgamated with IPCL. This marked its entry in the polyester sector. The polyester units are based in Hoshiarpur (Punjab), Nagpur (Maharashtra), Barabanki (Uttar Pradesh), Baulpur (Orissa), Allahabad (Uttar Pradesh) and Silvassa (Dadra and Nagar Haveli and Daman and Diu).

== Disinvestment ==
In June 2002, the Government of India as a part of its disinvestment programme divested 26% of its equity shares in favour of Reliance Petroinvestments Limited (RPIL), a Reliance Group Company. RPIL acquired an additional 20% equity shares through a cash offer in terms of SEBI (Takeover Regulations) and held 46% of Company's equity shares. IPCL merged with Reliance Industries Ltd. in 2007.

In July 2003, India's Petroleum Minister Ram Naik voiced strong opposition to the government's proposed further disinvestment of its remaining stake in IPCL, arguing that it would exacerbate Reliance Industries' dominance in the sector. Naik highlighted RIL's existing 46% equity stake, acquired through the 2002 strategic sale, and warned that additional divestment could lead to a virtual monopoly in petrochemicals, potentially harming competition and consumer interests. Though the government proceeded with subsequent stake dilutions leading to the full merger with RIL in 2007.

== See also ==
- IPCL Ground
