= Coal India =

Government owned coal producer in India

Coal India Limited
- Native name: कोल इंडिया लिमिटेड
- Type: Central Public Sector Enterprise
- Traded as: BSE: 533278; NSE: COALINDIA; NSE NIFTY 50 constituent
- ISIN: INE522F01014
- Industry: Mining, Refinery
- Founded: 1975; 51 years ago
- Headquarters: Kolkata, West Bengal, India
- Area served: Worldwide
- Key people: Shri B. Sairam (Chairman & MD)
- Products: Coal
- Revenue: ▲₹168,400 crore (US$17 billion) (2026)
- Operating income: ▲₹44,510 crore (US$4.6 billion) (2026)
- Net income: ▲₹38,980 crore (US$4.0 billion) (2026)
- Total assets: ▲₹269,189 crore (US$28 billion) (2026)
- Total equity: ▲₹91,240 crore (US$9.5 billion) (2026)
- Owner: Government of India (63.13%)
- Number of employees: 225,480 (2026)
- Website: www.coalindia.in
- Footnotes; Financials as of 31 March 2025.

Coal India Limited (CIL) is an Indian state-owned coal mining company headquartered in Kolkata. It is the largest coal producer in the world by output and operates under the administrative control of the Ministry of Coal.

It accounts for around 82% of the total coal production in India. It produced 554.14 million tonnes of raw coal in 2016–17, compared to 494.24 million tonnes during FY 2014–15 and earned revenue of ₹95,435 crore (US$9.9 billion) from sale of coal in the same financial year. In April 2011, CIL was conferred the Maharatna status by the Government of India, making it one of the seven companies with that status. As of 14 October 2015, CIL is a PSU owned by the Central Government of India which controls its operations through the Ministry of Coal.

CIL ranks 8th among the top 20 firms responsible for a third of all global carbon emissions. In 2024, CIL was responsible for 1,513 Mt of CO_{2} emissions, which was 3.92% of global CO_{2} emissions.

== History ==
Coal mining in India had primarily been a private sector enterprise. This changed in September 1956 when the Government of India established its own coal company National Coal Development Corporation (NCDC). Collieries run by the Railways formed the nucleus of NCDC. This was to fulfill the fast growing energy requirements in the country to support rapid industrialization taking place through Five-Year Plans of the Government. In the same year, Singareni Colliery Company, which was operating in Andhra Pradesh since 1920, was also brought under the Government control when the Central Government and state Government of Andhra Pradesh acquired 45% and 55% shares respectively.

In 1971, the Government of India nationalized all the 214 coking-coal mines and 12 coke-ovens running in the private sector, excluding those held by TISCO and IISCO for their captive use. On 1 January 1972, a new Government company Bharat Coking Coal Limited (BCCL) was formed to take control of these nationalized mines and coke-ovens. On 30 January 1973, all the remaining 711 non-coking coalmines of the country in private sector were also nationalized. 184 of these mines were handed over to BCCL, and remaining 527 were handed over to a newly opened department Coal Mines Authority. 4 months later, on 14 June 1973, this department was converted into a separate Government company CMAL. NCDC, earlier formed in 1957, was merged with CMAL, and 45% share-holding of Central Government in Singareni Collieries Company Ltd was also handed over to CMAL. CMAL started functioning with its 4 divisions, viz, Eastern Coalfields, Central Coalfields, Western Coalfields, and Central Mine Planning and Design Institute.

By 1973, all coking coalmines were under BCCL, which was functioning as a subsidiary of Steel Authority of India (SAIL) under Department of Steel of the Ministry of Steel and Mines; and all non-coking coalmines were under CMAL, which was under Department of Mines of the Ministry of Steel and Mines. For better control, both BCCL and CMAL were brought on 11 October 1974 under the Department of Coal (now an independent Ministry) of the newly formed Ministry of Energy.

On 1 November 1975, a new public-sector company Coal India Limited (CIL) was formed to enable better organizational and operational efficiency in coal sector. All the 4 Divisions of CMAL were given the company status, and were brought under CIL along with BCCL. 45% share-holding of the CMAL in Singareni Collieries Company was also transferred to CIL, and CMAL was closed.

Thus, CIL started functioning in 1975 with 5 subsidiary companies under it. These were Bharat Coking Coal Limited (BCCL), Eastern Coalfields Limited (ECL), Central Coalfields Limited (CCL), Western Coalfields Limited (WCL), and Central Mine Planning & Design Institute Limited (CMPDIL). In due course of time, 3 more companies were formed under CIL by carving out certain areas of CCL and WCL. These were Northern Coalfields Limited (NCL), South-Eastern Coalfields Limited (SECL), and Mahanadi Coalfields Limited (MCL).

Pursuant to the Fuel Policy of 1974, CIL also started the construction of India's first Low Temperature Carbonisation Plant at Dankuni in the late 1970s. It was renamed as Dankuni Coal Complex, and is one of the only operational coal gas plant of this kind in the world. Dankuni Coal Complex has been incurring heavy loss due to the Greater Calcutta Gas Supply Company (formerly known as Oriental Gas Co.) giving non-remunerative price and fixing them unilaterally. Coal India is planning to venture into Coal-to-Methanol technology at the existing Plant.

The Government of India held 100% equity of CIL from 1975 till 2010.

=== Initial public offering ===
In October 2010, the Government of India made an initial public offering (IPO) of 10% of the equity shares of CIL (631.6 million equity shares) to public at an offer price of ₹245 (US$2.50) per share (at face value of ₹ 10 per share). The IPO was oversubscribed by 14.17 times. Against an IPO issue size of ₹15,500 crore (equivalent to ₹380 billion or US$3.9 billion in 2026) it received bids for ₹2.4 lakh crore (equivalent to ₹5.9 trillion or US$61 billion in 2026) making it the second highest collections in any IPO in India. On the first day of its listing on the stock market, its shares soared 40% higher than IPO price. With the listing, CIL became the fourth most valued company on the Indian stock exchanges with a market value of ₹2.16 lakh crore (equivalent to ₹5.3 trillion or US$55 billion in 2026). CIL was included in the 30-member BSE SENSEX on 8 August 2011.

On 30 January 2015, in an offer for sale (OFS), Government of India sold a further 10% stake in CIL. Priced at ₹358 (US$3.70) per share, the sale fetched the government ₹22,557.63 crore (equivalent to ₹370 billion or US$3.86 billion in 2026), making it the largest ever equity offering in the Indian share market.

== Operations ==
CIL is the largest coal producing company in the world. It produced 536.51 MT (million tonne) coal during FY 2015–16. Coal India operates through 83 mining areas in 8 states of India. As on 1 April 2015, it has 430 coal mines out of which 175 are open cast, 227 are underground and 28 are mixed mines. Production from open cast mines during FY 2014–15 was 92.91% of total production of 494.24 MT. Underground mines contributed to 7.09% of production. CIL further operates 15 coal washeries, out of which 12 are for coking coal and 3 are for non-coking coal with 23.30 MTY and 13.50 MTY capacities respectively. CIL's only Low Temperature Carbonisation Plant of Dankuni Coal Complex is currently run on lease basis by its subsidiary SECL. In addition to above, it also manages 200 other establishments like workshops, hospitals, training institutes, mine-rescue setups, etc.

=== Subsidiaries ===
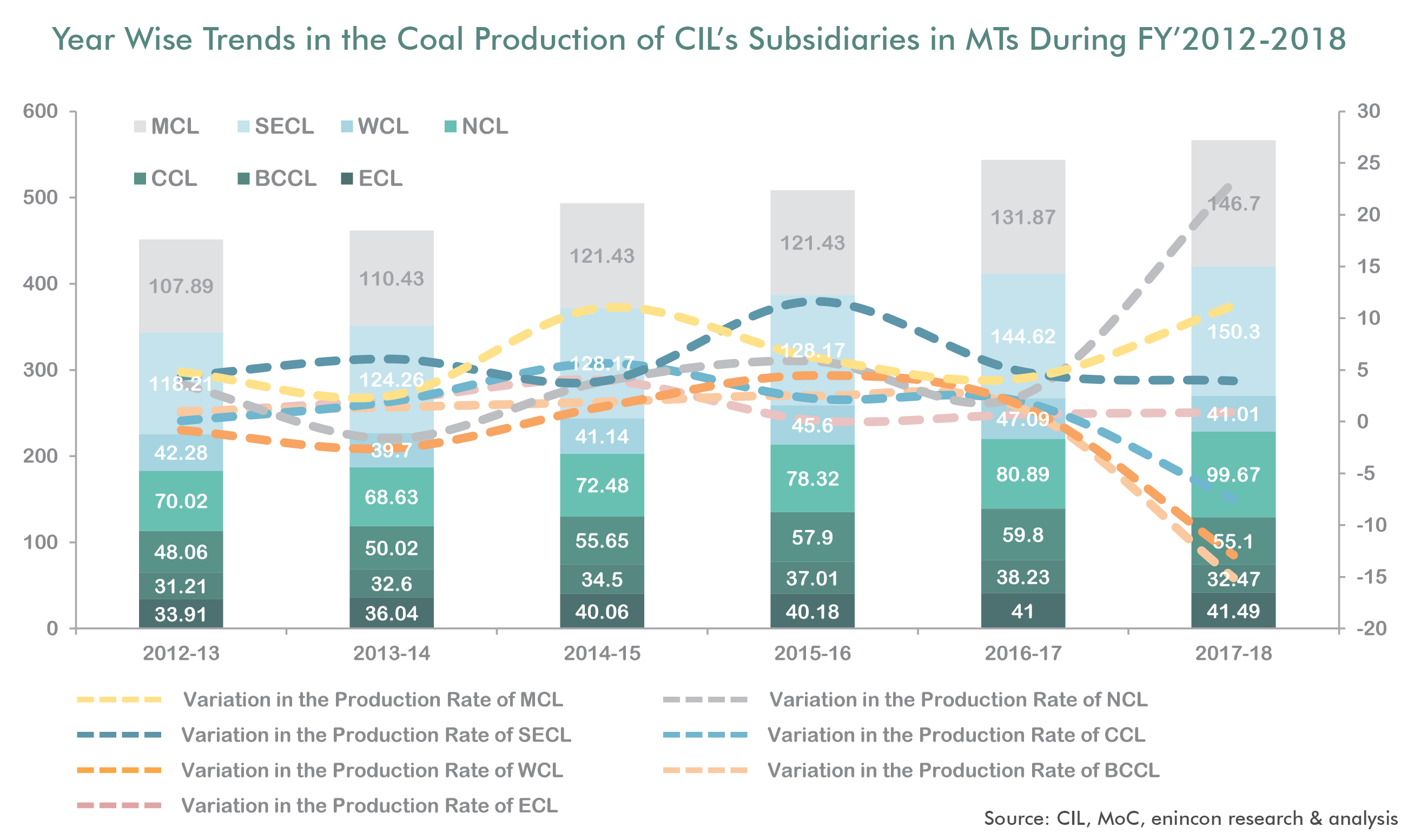
Year Wise Trends in the Coal Production of CILs Subsidiaries in MTs During FY 2012–2018

CIL produces coal through seven of its wholly owned subsidiaries. These are Eastern Coalfields Limited (ECL), Bharat Coking Coal Limited (BCCL), Central Coalfields Limited (CCL), Western Coalfields Limited (WCL), South Eastern Coalfields Limited (SECL), Northern Coalfield Limited (NCL), and Mahanadi Coalfields Limited (MCL). Its 8th wholly owned subsidiary Central Mine Planning & Design Institute Limited (CMPDIL) provides exploration, planning and technical support to all the 7 production subsidiaries. CMPDIL also provides consulting services to third-party market clients in the field of exploration, mining, allied engineering & testing, management-systems, training, etc. The North Eastern Coalfields (NEC) and Dankuni Coal Complex (DCC) are owned directly by the parent holding company of CIL. However, DCC has been leased to SECL since 1995.

CIL also has a wholly owned subsidiary in Mozambique, Coal India Africana Limitada (CIAL) for pursuing coal mining opportunities in that country.

The details of number of employees, revenue for FY 2012–13 and production of coal are given in the table below:

Subsidiaries of Coal India Limited
Name of Subsidiary	Employees (as of 31 March 2023)	Revenue (₹ billion for FY 2012–13)	Coal Production(in million Tons)		
Name of Subsidiary	Employees (as of 31 March 2023)	Revenue (₹ billion for FY 2012–13)	Coking Coal	Non-Coking Coal	Total Coal Production
Bharat Coking Coal Limited (BCCL)	36172	89.37	26.970	4.243	31.213
Central Coalfields Limited (CCL)	34902	92.38	16.156	31.905	48.061
Eastern Coalfields Limited (ECL)	50867	97.40	0.043	33.868	33.911
Mahanadi Coalfields Limited (MCL)	21770	120.93	–	107.894	107.894
Northern Coalfields Limited (NCL)	13752	99.86	–	70.021	70.021
South Eastern Coalfields Limited (SECL)	41743	176.48	0.157	118.062	118.219
Western Coalfields Limited (WCL)	34289	74.23	0.330	41.957	42.287
Central Mine Planning and Design Institute (CMPDI)	2850	6.05	-	–	–
Coal India Africana Limitada	–	–	–	–	–
North Eastern Coalfields	663	–	–	0.605	0.605
Dankuni Coal Complex	131	–	–	–	–
CIL Headquarters	664	13.78	–	–	–
Total	237803	770.49	43.656	408.555	452.211

=== Joint ventures ===
CIL has four joint ventures –

1. International Coal Ventures Private Limited (ICVPL) was formed in 2009 for acquisition of coking coal properties outside India. CIL holds 2/7^{th} share in paid up capital of ICVPL.
2. CIL-NTPC Urja Private Limited is a 50:50 JV between CIL and NTPC, formed in April 2010 for acquisition of coal blocks in India and abroad.
3. Bharat Coal Gasification and Chemicals Limited
4. Coal Gas India Limited

== Listing and shareholding ==
Listing: CIL's equity shares are listed on the Bombay Stock Exchange where it is a constituent of the BSE SENSEX index and the National Stock Exchange of India where it is a constituent of the S&P CNX Nifty.

Shareholding: On 30 January 2015, 79.65% of the equity shares of the company were owned by the Government of India and the remaining 20.35% were owned by others. On 30 January 2015, in an Offer For Sale (OFS), Government of India sold a further 10% stake in CIL. Priced at ₹358 (equivalent to ₹590 or US$6.10 in 2026) per share, the sale fetched the government ₹22,557.63 crore (US$2.3 billion), making it the largest ever equity offering in the Indian share market. On 18 November 2015, Government of India approved another 10% stake sale in CIL.

Shareholder Type ( December 2023 )	Percentage (%)
Promoters	63.13
Domestic Institutional Investors	23.53
Foreign Institutional Investors	8.22
Public & Other	4.00
Government Holding	0.10
Corporate Holding	0.90

== Employees ==
As of 2023–24, Coal India Limited had approximately 2.2 lakh employees, comprising around 16,000 executives and over 2 lakh non-executives.

Year	Total Employees
2023 (November)	232,592
2024 (1 April)	228,861
2025 (March)	220,272

== Awards and recognitions ==
- Coal India Limited (CIL) was conferred with two Corporate Social Responsibility Awards on 18 February 2013: 'Global CSR Excellence and Leadership Award' for Best Corporate Social Responsibility Practices and 'Blue Dart Most Caring Companies of India Award'.
- For 2012, CIL earned a ranking of 48 on overall global performance in the 'Platts Top 250 Global Energy Company Rankings'.
- CIL features on the Forbes Global 2000 rankings for 2012 at position 377. Coal India on the Forbes Global 2000 List Forbes 31 May 2013 19 October 2013
- In December 2012, it was ranked as the 9th on the Fortune India 500 list. IOC retains top slot in Fortune 500 India list as of in The Hindu 15 December 2012 19 October 2013
- CIL was conferred with 'Company of the Year Award' in a function organized by Indian Chamber of Commerce and Department of Public Enterprises (DPE) in September 2011 at 2nd Summit on 'India Public Sector Agenda @2020' at New Delhi.
- Many of Its employees are conferred with a job in lieu of land. The one being the largest Penganga Opencast of WCL, New Majri UG To OC, Makardhokra etc.
- This year, one of its employees named "Shardaprasad Prajapati (NEIS-54262)" has been conferred with the "Youngest" Employee to be given a job in lieu of land acquired in Majri Area of Western Coalfields Limited.

== Profit ==
Coal India reported a rise of almost 46% in its net profit for the quarter ended 31 March 2022 in consolidated terms. India's biggest coal miner had posted a consolidated net profit of ₹4,586.78 crore in the year-ago period.

The company registered sales worth ₹30,046.25 crore during the quarter under review compared with ₹24,510.80 crore. Total revenue from operations stood at ₹32,706.77 crore during Q4 FY22, against ₹26,700.14 crore in Q4 FY21.

== Green initiatives ==
CIL planted 1.57 million saplings during 2014–15. In its annual report CIL informed that it has planted around 82 million trees over an area of around 33700 Ha.

Coal India is implementing 8 pumped storage projects with the help of NHPC by converting all de-coaled mines.

== Criticism ==
In September 2011, CAG criticised of for operating 239 mines in seven coal producing subsidiaries, which existed prior to 1994, without environmental clearance. These mines included 48 open-cast, 170 underground and 21 combined mines. In its report, the CAG also pointed out that of the 18 sample open-cast and eight underground mines, ten mines had undertaken capacity expansion without environmental clearances. The company, in its reply, said that applications for clearances to the projects have already been submitted to the Ministry of Environment and Forests.

In India, some coal mines are located near/below the tiger reserves. Mining or construction of administrative offices in/near these reserves disturbs the wildlife. Hence environmental organisations like Greenpeace have been opposing mining in these areas. Around 50% of the energy requirements of India are met by coal. Hence the protection of wildlife is sometimes overlooked due to this fact. In its argument, the CIL said that in many cases it only does underground mining which does not hurt the forests above.

CIL reported lowest ever figures of average 66 deaths and 251 serious accidents per year for the period 2010–2012, indicating that safety at workplace is improving over the years. Critics claim that the safety practices in most mines are inadequate, which is causing too many casualties. It is also claimed that many accidents and deaths are not recorded and hence are not part of 'official figures'.

Despite widespread international sanctions against Russia due to its invasion of Ukraine, Coal India has continued its operations involving Russian coking coal. The company, along with other Indian buyers, has been criticized for contributing to the surge in imports of Russian coal, which reached 5.2 million tonnes from January to August 2024—a 53% year-on-year increase. Coal India expecting highest import level in 2 years in 2024. Critics argue that this trade not only undermines global efforts to isolate Russia but also indirectly supports a regime engaged in ongoing aggression and human rights violations in Ukraine. The decision to maintain business ties with Russia has drawn scrutiny for prioritizing economic gains over ethical considerations.

== See also ==
- List of companies of India
- List of largest companies by revenue
- List of corporations by market capitalization
- Make in India
- Forbes Global 2000
- Fortune India 500
- Coal mining in India
- Durand Cup
