= Ashok Group =

Tourism company in the Indian government

- Type: Public Sector Undertaking
- Industry: Tourism
- Founded: 1966
- Headquarters: New Delhi
- Owner: Government of India
- Divisions: India Tourism Development Corporation
- Website: itdc.co.in

The Ashok Group is a division of India Tourism Development Corporation which is a central public sector undertaking, under the ownership of Ministry of Tourism, Government of India. It is headquartered in New Delhi. It is the second largest central government-owned-hospitality service provider in India.

== Properties ==
- The Ashok, New Delhi
- Samrat Hotel, Delhi
- Hotel Kalinga Ashok, Bhubaneswar
- Hotel Pondicherry Ashok, Pondicherry
- Hotel Nilanchanl Ashok, Puri (Hotel Closed)
