= Automotive industry in Hyderabad =

The automotive industry in Hyderabad began in the 1930s. Manufacturing started with the establishment of Hyderabad Allwyn, which manufactured auto-components and assembled Albion CX9 buses for Hyderabad State Railways. It was a joint venture of Industrial Development Trust of the Nizam's Hyderabad Government and Allwyn & Company. Praga Tools was established in 1943; HMT bearings opened in 1963 followed by Ordnance Factory Medak in 1984.

The industry expanded in the 21st century with support of the Telangana government and the introductions of Tata Boeing Aerospace Limited in 2007, Deccan Auto in 2011 and a Mahindra tractor plant in 2012. National and multinational companies followed, such as Hyundai Motor Company, Fiat Chrysler Automobiles and Maruti Suzuki. Research and development, manufacturing, marketing and assembling units opened in Hyderabad. The Telangana government supported startups and attracted electric vehicle company Triton to manufacture in Hyderabad.
