= Hyderabad Allwyn =

Indian state manufacturing company (1942–1999)

Hyderabad Allwyn Limited
- Type: now defunct, Public Sector Undertaking (Andhra Pradesh State Government)
- Industry: Automotive, Watch, Refrigerators, Home appliance, Vehicle Coach building
- Founded: 1942, Hyderabad as Allwyn Metal Works Ltd.
- Defunct: 1999
- Headquarters: Hyderabad,
- Products: Allwyn Refrigerators, Allwyn Watches, Allwyn Pusphak – Scooters, Allwyn – Nissan Cabstar Truck.
- Number of employees: over 6500

Hyderabad Allwyn Limited, established in 1942, was a Hyderabad State government engineering and white goods manufacturing company involved in manufacture of automobiles, trucks, scooters, bus coach building, refrigerators and wrist watches.

Allwyn Refrigerators and Allwyn Watches were once a leading brand in India during the 1970s and 1980s. The company was closed in 1995 after heavy losses, primarily due to mismanagement.

== Early history and products ==
Advertisement for Allwyn Refrigerators (The Hyderabad Allwyn Metal Works Limited)

Hyderabad Allwyn Limited was established in January 1942 as Allwyn Metal Works. It was started as joint venture of Industrial Development Trust of the Nizam's Hyderabad Government and M/s Allwyn & Company.

Hyderabad Allwyn Metal Works Limited used to assemble Albion CX9 buses for Hyderabad State Railways, and made the ballot boxes for the first general elections in 1952. In 1969 due to inability of its management to run the company efficiently, it was taken over by the state government.

=== Coach Building division ===
The first double-decker buses in Hyderabad were introduced in April 1963. These buses were designed by Hyderabad Allwyn Limited with APSRTC . Eventually the Coach building division became one of the largest coach building contractors for the Andhra Pradesh government's state operated APSRTC buses. Allwyn also built the Indian Army's medium-capacity Shaktiman truck bodies which were originally designed by MAN, Germany as the 415 L1 AR truck.The Delhi Transport Corporation was also a regular customer for Hyderabad Allwyn buses, with buses built on both Tata and Ashok Leyland chassis being built for the DTC for intercity and city applications.

=== Refrigeration and Appliance division ===
The Allwyn refrigerators were one of the most popular brands in India. Its rivals were Godrej, Kelvinator and Voltas. Even until 2005 the refrigerators were widely rated for their energy efficiency.

== Under Andhra Pradesh State Government ==
=== Tie-in with Nissan ===
In 1983 the automobile division entered into a tie-up with Nissan Motor Company, Japan to manufacture the Nissan Cabstar range of Light commercial trucks. The plant was set up at Zahirabad near Hyderabad and this division was named as Hyderabad Allwyn Nissan Ltd with Nissan holding 15% of the equity.

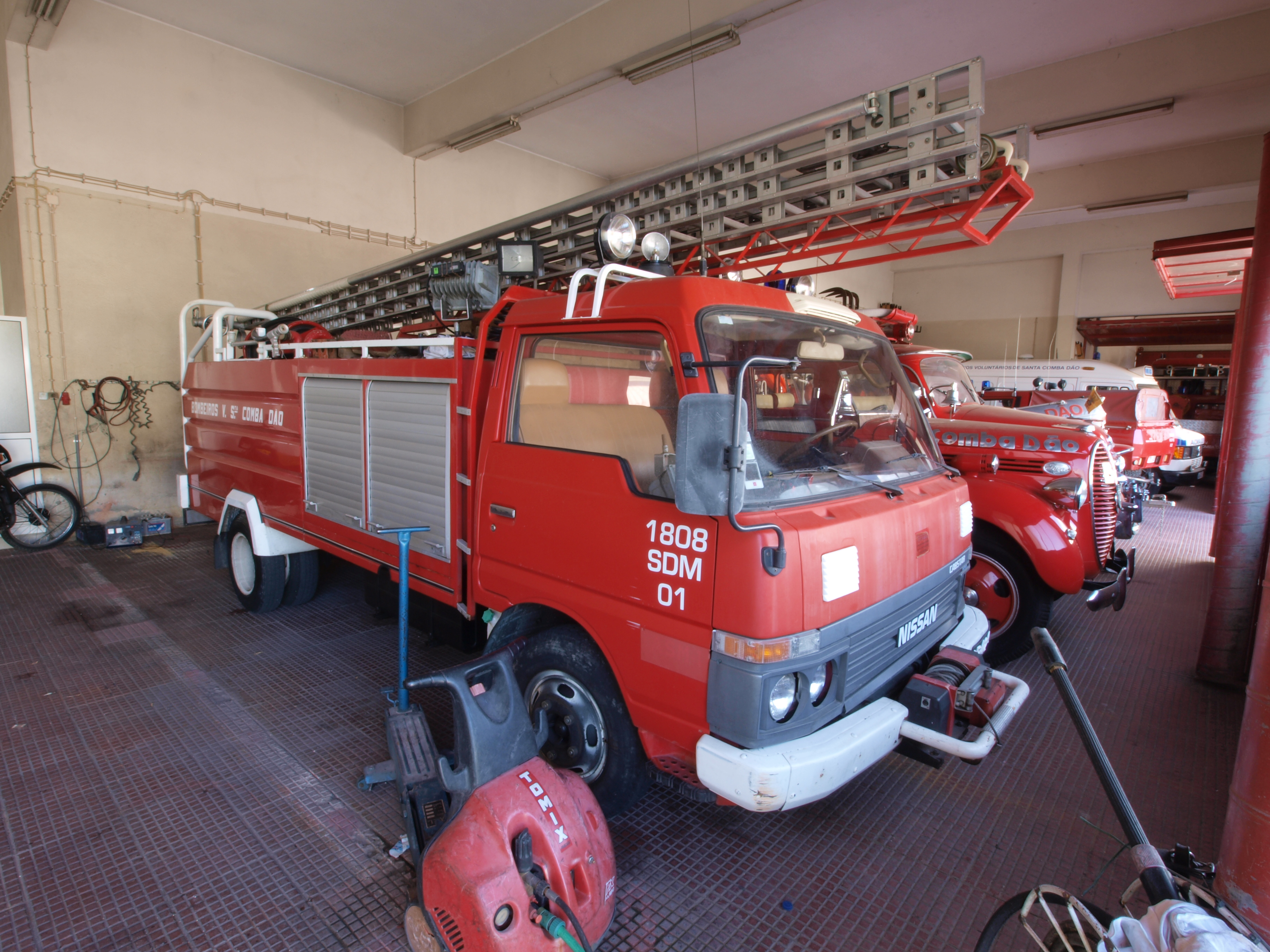
A Nissan Cabstar model that was manufactured and sold in India by Allywn, as Allwyn Nissan and currently by Mahindra & Mahindra as Mahindra Loadking

=== Watch Division ===
Hyderabad Allwyn entered the watch business in 1981 in collaboration with Seiko of Japan to manufacture mechanical and Quartz watches. Until then the central Government-run HMT had been the market leader for wrist watches in India. Allwyn along with HMT and Titan Industries had dominated the Indian watch market with almost 10% of the market share. In 1987, A. R. Rahman, who was then still known as Dileep, received his first break in advertising when he was asked to compose the jingle for a new line of Allwyn Trendy Watches. The brand also cemented its place in popular culture, featuring prominently in Indian films such as Shubh Kaamna (1983) and Lucky Bhaskar (2024), with the latter being filmed at the original Hyderabad facility.

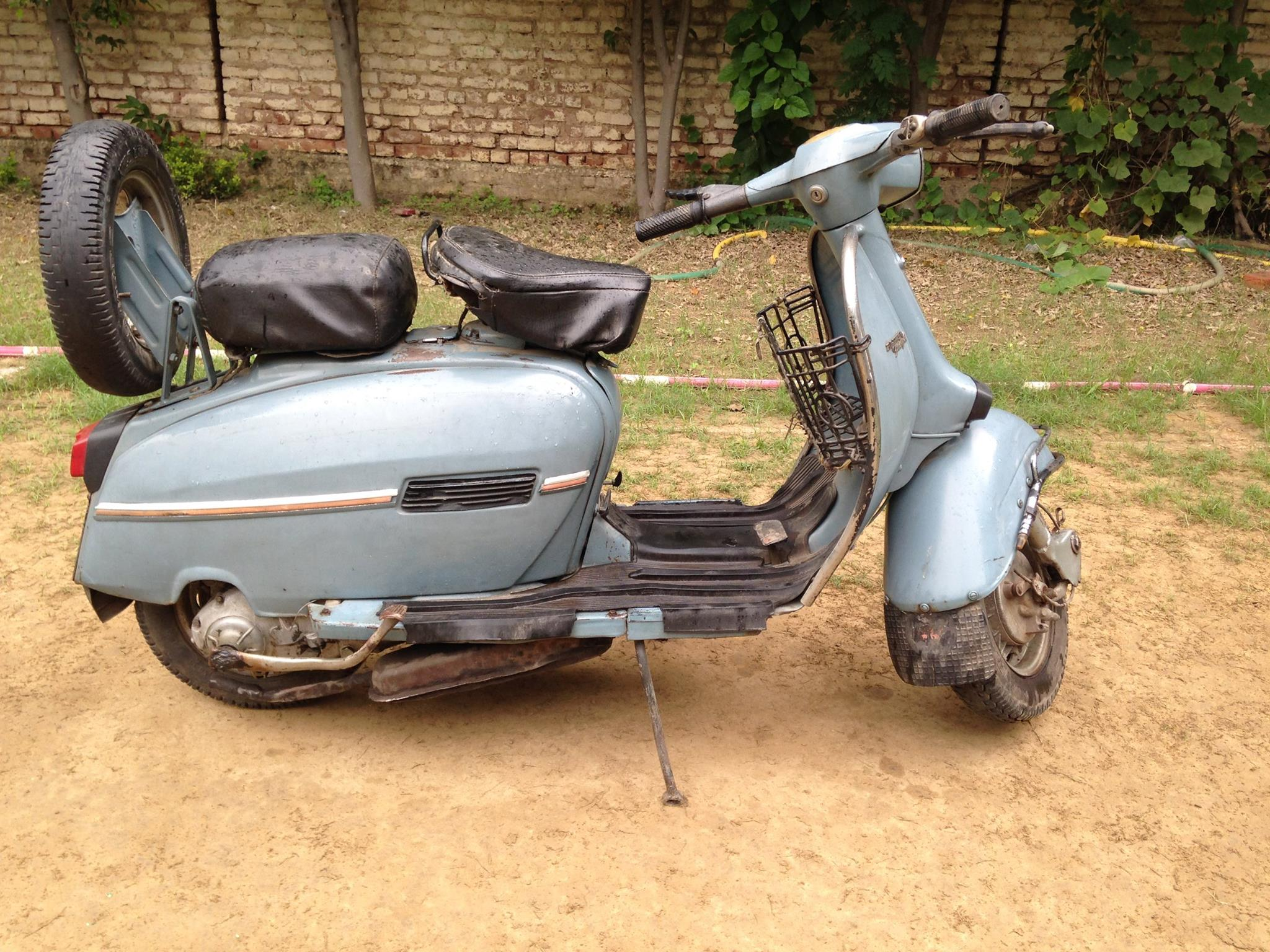
Allwyn Pushpak 1982

=== Scooters ===
Andhra Pradesh Scooters Limited (APSL) had manufactured scooters under the brand name Allwyn Pushpak and Piaggio scooters under the name Vespa PL170.

== Closure and aftermath ==
However, by the mid-1990s the performance of the company was very weak and by 1993 all its reserves were washed off. Hyderabad Allwyn Limited had become sick company when its accumulated losses had exceeded Rs.180 crores (INR 1.8 Bn) as on 31 March 1993 and was referred to the Board for Industrial and Financial Reconstruction (BIFR) under the provisions of the Sick Industrial Companies (Special Provisions) Act, 1985. Hyderabad Allwyn become a company with negative net worth. The BIFR in January 1993 declared Hyderabad Allwyn Ltd., as a sick industry and appointed IDBI as an operating agency to prepare a rehabilitation scheme. The Government of Andhra Pradesh agreed to amalgamate Hyderabad Allwyn Limited's Refrigeration and Appliances division with Voltas Limited, a Tata group company which retained only 5000 Allwyn employees.

The company had three divisions: bus body building, watches, and refrigerators. The Watch Division of erstwhile Hyderabad Allwyn Limited was formed into a new company as Allwyn Watches Limited and the Auto and Bus Body division was formed into a new company called Allwyn Auto Ltd. Consequent to the scheme of Amalgamation as approved by the BIFR, M/s.Hyderabad Allwyn Limited ceased to be in existence.

The refrigerators division which was privatised in 1994 and handed over to Voltas continued with the Allwyn range of models. In 2002, Voltas themselves sold their refrigerator division to the Sweden based Electrolux, which phased out the Allwyn models.

APSL, the scooter division is also presently liquidated. The watch division is now closed and is pending before BIFR.

=== Sale of Allwyn Nissan ===
In 1989 Allwyn Nissan was privatised and sold to Mahindra, renaming the company as Mahindra Nissan Allwyn Ltd. In 1994 MNAL was merged with Mahindra & Mahindra, and the Zahirabad unit is Mahindra & Mahindra's light commercial vehicles unit. The old Allwyn Nissan LCV is still sold by Mahindra as the Mahindra Loadking in various configurations like light tipper and Kerala remains one of its largest markets.

== See also ==
- Allwyn Colony
