= West Bengal State Electricity Distribution Company Limited =

State-owned utility company in West Bengal state, India

- Emblem of West Bengal

- Logo of the WBSEDCL
- Trade name: WBSEDCL
- Native name: পশ্চিমবঙ্গ রাজ্য বিদ্যুৎ বণ্টন কোম্পানি লিমিটেড
- Type: State Government Enterprise
- Industry: Power distribution and hydro generation
- Predecessor: West Bengal State Electricity Board (WBSEB)
- Founded: April 1, 2007; 19 years ago
- Headquarters: Vidyut Bhavan, Block-DJ, Sector-II, Salt Lake City, Kolkata, India
- Area served: West Bengal (except for areas served by CESC Limited)
- Key people: Santanu Basu, IAS (Chairman & Managing Director)
- Products: Electricity
- Services: Electricity distribution, Hydel power generation
- Revenue: ▲₹38,745.33 crore (US$4.0 billion) (2024–2025)
- Operating income: ▲₹33,199.36 crore (US$3.4 billion) (2024-2025)
- Net income: ▲₹173.5 crore (US$18 million) (2024–2025)
- Total assets: ▲₹50,681.44 crore (US$5.3 billion) (2024–2025)
- Total equity: ▲₹5,308.46 crore (US$550 million) (2024-25)
- Owner: Government of West Bengal (100%)
- Number of employees: 9,329 (2025)
- Parent: Government of West Bengal
- Subsidiaries: West Bengal Green Energy Development Corporation Limited (WBGEDCL)
- Website: www.wbsedcl.in
- Footnotes; Figures are based on 2024–2025 financial results and official company profiles.

West Bengal State Electricity Distribution Company Limited (WBSEDCL) is a wholly owned enterprise of Government of West Bengal, established in 2007 as one of the two successors of West Bengal State Electricity Board (WBSEB), and is responsible for providing power to 96% of West Bengal with a customer base of more than 2.2 crore across the state.

It states its vision "to be the best power utility in India in terms of customer service, efficient, and financial viability" while its mission to "supply uninterrupted and quality power to all."

It is expanding the range and quantity of uninterrupted electric supply in the remote villages in rapid speed.

== History ==
The Government of West Bengal unbundled the erstwhile West Bengal State Electricity Board (WBSEB) into two companies: West Bengal State Electricity Distribution Company Limited (WBSEDCL) and West Bengal State Electricity Transmission Company Limited (WBSETCL). The main business of WBSEDCL is distribution and hydro generation of electricity. It is also the nodal agency of the Government of West Bengal for undertaking the Rural Electrification task in the State with the objective of providing access to electricity to all rural households in the state in line with the National Rural Electrification Policy. After the successful implementation of the Purulia Pumped Storage Project in the 10th Plan period with a capacity of 900 MW hydel power, the company has taken up the ambitious plan of implementing the Turga Pumped Storage Project in the 13th Plan period with an installed capacity of 4 x 250 MW.

== Recruitment ==
WBSEDCL recruits its officers and employees through various competitive examinations, including the Graduate Aptitude Test in Engineering (GATE) and other recruitment examinations conducted by the corporation. Class I or Group A officers of the technical cadre are primarily recruited through the GATE examination, while officers of the finance cadre are appointed through separate examinations conducted by WBSEDCL.

== Training ==
After qualifying through the Graduate Aptitude Test in Engineering (GATE), candidates join the services of WBSEDCL at the post of Assistant Engineer (AE). Induction training is conducted at Vidyut Bhavan in Bidhannagar, Kolkata, in their respective disciplines. From the first day of appointment, officers are entitled to receive full salary and associated benefits. Following the completion of induction training, Assistant Engineers are posted at various customer care centres and divisional offices across the state. The probation period for Assistant Engineers is two years.

== Organizational Structure ==
=== Board of Directors ===
The company is managed by a board of directors comprising fourteen members, out of which seven are executive directors (coming from the WBSEDCL Group A engineers, WBCS officers and other dignitaries), including chairman and managing director who is an IAS officer. Besides one woman director and six independent directors constitute the board includes:

Board of Directors
Sl. No.	Name	Designation
1	Mr. Santanu Basu, IAS	Chairman & Managing Director
2	Mr. Ajay Kumar Pandey	Director (Regulatory & Trading)
3	Mr. Avijit Kumar Latua, IAS	Director (Human Resources)
4	Mr. Partha Pratim Mukherjee	Director (Generation)
5	Mr. Debasish Roychoudhury	Director (Finance)
6	Mr. Sumit Mukherjee	Director (Distribution)
7	Shri Pathik Kumar Nayek	Director (Projects)
Independent Directors
8	Mr. Pankaj Batra	Independent Director
9	Mr. Srikumar Bandyopadhyay	Independent Director
10	Ms. Rita Mukherjie	Independent & Woman Director
11	Mr. Rudra Chatterjee	Independent Director
12	Mr. Mehul Mohanka	Independent Director
13	Mr. Umesh Chowdhary	Independent Director
Government Nominee
14	Shri Lalbahadur Sardar, WBA&AS	Government Nominee Director

=== Career Progression ===
Any Class I officer begins their career as an Assistant Engineer (AE). After approximately 8 years of service, they become eligible for promotion to Divisional Engineer (DE). Following around 15 years of service, officers are typically promoted to the position of Regional Manager. After about 21 years of service, they advance to the post of Zonal Manager. Subsequently, after nearly 27 years of service, officers are promoted to the rank of Chief Engineer, which is generally the terminal rank for most engineering personnel.

Only a limited number of officers are later empanelled for higher positions such as Director, based on merit, experience, and organizational requirements. However, the position of Managing Director is typically held by a non-technical officer, usually from the Indian Administrative Service (IAS).

Ranks, designations, and positions held by Group A / Class 1 officers in their career in the WBSEDCL
Grade/Scale (Level on Pay Matrix)	Posting at Field Offices and Vidyut Bhabhan	Posting in the Mahakaran	Equivalent Rank in Government of India	Pay Scale (Basic Pay) as per 2026 7th Pay Commission in West Bengal
Apex Scale (Pay level 17)	Chairman & Managing Director	Chief Secretary	Secretary	₹225,000 (US$2,300)
Higher Administrative Grade (Pay level 15)	Director Executive Director	Principal Secretary	Additional Secretary	₹186,500 (US$1,900)—₹210,800 (US$2,200)
Senior Administrative Grade (Pay level 14)	Chief Engineer General Manager	Secretary	Joint Secretary	₹147,300 (US$1,500)—₹204,500 (US$2,100)
Selection Grade (Pay level 13)	Additional Chief Engineer Zonal Manager	Joint Secretary	Director	₹134,500 (US$1,400)—₹198,300 (US$2,100)
Junior Administrative Grade (Pay level 12)	Superintending Engineer Regional Manager	Director	Deputy Secretary	₹96,800 (US$1,000)—₹181,200 (US$1,900)
Senior Time Scale (Pay level 11)	Divisional Engineer Divisional Manager	Deputy Secretary	Under Secretary	₹73,700 (US$770)—₹165,600 (US$1,700)
Junior Time Scale (Pay level 10)	Assistant Engineer Assistant Manager	Under Secretary	Assistant Secretary	₹56,100 (US$580)—₹160,500 (US$1,700)

Facilities: In addition to the Basic Pay, officers and employees are entitled to various allowances, including Dearness Allowance (DA), House Rent Allowance (HRA), Electricity Allowance (EA), Medical Allowance (MA), and Leave Travel Concession (LTC), in accordance with the provisions of the 7th Pay Commission. This ultimately create a salary more than a Group A WBCS officer. Employees are also eligible for leave benefits as per the Government leave policy. Newly appointed Group A officers are provided with official residential accommodation (on availability, such as 2 BHK for AE, 3 BHK for DE, 4 BHK for RM and above) and an official vehicle from the first day of service. Vehicles allotted for official duties may include models such as the Mahindra Bolero (for AE & AM), Mahindra Scorpio (for DE & DM), and Toyota Fortuner (for SE & RM and above).

=== Offices ===
The organization is divided into key functional areas covering Distribution, Projects, Generation, Finance, and Human Resources. It operates through a decentralized, hierarchical structure comprising 6 Zones, 23 Regional Offices, 79 Divisions, and more than 534 Customer Care Centers (CCCs).

WBSEDCL Administrative Structure
Zone	Regional Office	Division(s)
Kolkata Zone	Bidhannagar	Bidhannagar-I, Bidhannagar-II
Kolkata Zone	South 24 Parganas	Behala, Garia, Baruipur, Diamond Harbour, Kakdwip, Baruipur, Canning
Kolkata Zone	North 24 Parganas	Barrackpore, Naihati, Barasat, Basirhat, Habra, Bongaon
Kolkata Zone	Howrah	Howrah-I, Howrah-II, Uluberia
Kolkata Zone	Hooghly	Serampore, Chandannagar, Tarakeswar, Arambag, Singur, Mogra
Burdwan Zone	Purba Bardhaman	Burdwan, Memari, Katwa, Kalna
Burdwan Zone	Paschim Bardhaman	Durgapur, Asansol
Burdwan Zone	Birbhum	Suri, Bolpur, Rampurhat, Rampurhat
Burdwan Zone	Bankura	Bankura, Bishnupur, Khatra
Midnapore Zone	Paschim Medinipur	Kharagpur, Belda, Ghatal
Midnapore Zone	Purba Medinipur	Midnapore, Jhargram, Egra
Midnapore Zone	Tamluk	Tamluk, Contai, Haldia
Midnapore Zone	Purulia	Purulia, Raghunathpur
Baharampur Zone	Murshidabad	Berhampore-I, Berhampore-II, Domkal, Raghunathganj, Jiaganj, Kandi
Baharampur Zone	Nadia	Kalyani, Krishnagar, Tehatta
Malda Zone	Malda	Malda South, Malda North, Chanchal
Malda Zone	Dakshin Dinajpur	Balurghat, Buniadpur
Malda Zone	Uttar Dinajpur	Raiganj, Islampur
Siliguri Zone	Jalpaiguri	Jalpaiguri, Malbazar
Siliguri Zone	Darjeeling	Siliguri Town, Siliguri Suburban, Kurseong, Darjeeling
Siliguri Zone	Kalimpong	Kalimpong
Siliguri Zone	Coachbehar	Coochbehar, Mathabhanga
Siliguri Zone	Alipurduar	Alipurduar

Each Customer Care Center is headed by an Assistant Engineer (Supply) [AE(Supply)] and is supported by officers such as Junior Engineer (Supply) [JE(Supply)] or Sub-Assistant Engineer (SAE), along with other employees and clerical staff. Each Division is headed by a Divisional Engineer / Divisional Manager (DE/DM) under whom 4 Assistant Engineers work as AE(Tech), AE(Supply), AE(DCC), AE(Store), while each Regional Office functions under the supervision of a Superintending Engineer / Regional Manager (SE/RM). The Zones are administered by Chief Engineers / Zonal Managers (CE/ZM).

Functional Areas of WBSEDCL
Technical Wing	HR & A Wing	Finance & Accounts Wing	Public Relations Wing	Medical Wing	Vigilance / Administration / Legal Wing	Board / Company Affairs Wing	Materials Wing
Assistant Engineer (AE); Junior Engineer (JE)	HR Officer; Administrative Officer	Finance Officer; Accounts Officer	Public Relations Officer	Medical Officer	Vigilance Officer; Legal Officer	Company Secretary	Materials Officer

== Operations ==
WBSEDCL provides power to a customer base of more than 2.03 crores across West Bengal through its service network spanning 5 zones, 20 regional offices, 76 distribution divisions, and 544 customer care centers.

In the field of Information Technology, WBSEDCL has implemented Enterprise Resource Planning. Likewise, SAP in financial accounting and control, material management, HR with payroll, plant maintenance and project system.

Apart from that SCADA, smart grid, development of IT system through R-APDRP Project, mobile app development, e-payment through website and third party, spot bill, WhatsApp chatbot, collection kiosk etc., have been implemented.

After successful implementation of Purulia Pumped Storage Project in 10th Plan period with a capacity of 900 MW hydel power, the company has taken up the ambitious plan of implementing Turga Pumped Storage Project in the 13th Plan period with installed capacity of 4 x 250 MW.

A project titled Integrated Power Development Scheme (IPDS) for strengthening of sub-transmission and distribution networks, metering of distribution transformers, reduction of AT&C loss, access to power to all households, etc., in the urban areas having population of more than 50,000 as per 2011 census has been undertaken. Many new sub-stations have been constructed under this centrally funded scheme across the state of West Bengal.

Another project titled Deendayal Upadhyaya Gram Jyoti Yojana (DDUGJY) for separation of agricultural and non-agricultural feeders, strengthening of sub-transmission and distribution networks, metering of distribution transformers, reduction of AT&C loss, access to power to all houseland, etc., in the rural areas has been undertaken. Many new sub-stations have been constructed under this centrally funded scheme across the state of West Bengal.

A new project to be funded by the World Bank is also in the pipeline.

A programme for system improvement under Sech Bandhu Scheme has also been conceived for rural areas.

== See also ==
- West Bengal State Electricity Transmission Company Limited
- West Bengal Power Development Corporation
- CESC Limited
- West Bengal Civil Service
