= National Seeds Corporation =

Indian government-owned company

NSC Limited
- Company type: Central Public Sector Undertaking
- Industry: Agriculture
- Founded: 19 March 1963; 63 years ago
- Headquarters: New Delhi, India
- Area served: India
- Key people: Dr. Maninder Kaur Dwivedi (IAS) (Chairman & MD)
- Revenue: ▼₹915.72 crore (US$96 million) (2021-22)
- Net income: ▲₹10.76 crore (US$1.1 million) (2021-22)
- Owner: Ministry of Agriculture and Farmers' Welfare
- Website: indiaseeds.com

National Seeds Corporation Limited, abbreviated as NSC, is an Indian government undertaking for the development of the seed industry in India. It produces 1.5 lakh tons of seed per year with net worth 633.62 Crores. Founded in March 1963, its headquarters is in New Delhi. It is a Mini Ratna company, wholly owned by Govt. Of India
