= Rail Vikas Nigam =

Indian rail development undertaking

Rail Vikas Nigam Limited
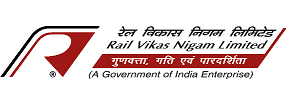
- Company type: Central PSU
- Traded as: BSE: 542649; NSE: RVNL
- Industry: Railway infrastructure
- Founded: 24 January 2003; 23 years ago in New Delhi, India
- Headquarters: Plot No. 25, First floor, August Kranti Bhawan, Africa Ave, Bhikaji Cama Place, Rama Krishna Puram, New Delhi-110066, India
- Area served: India
- Key people: Salim Ahmad; (Chairman & MD)
- Revenue: ₹19,381.71 crore (US$2.0 billion) (2022)
- Operating income: ₹1,476.14 crore (US$150 million) (2022)
- Total assets: ₹19,121.42 crore (US$2.0 billion) (2022)
- Total equity: ₹5,631.41 crore (US$590 million) (2022)
- Owner: Government of India (78.20%)
- Number of employees: 885 (March 2025)
- Subsidiaries: High Speed Rail Corporation of India Limited; Kyrgyzindustry-RVNL (50%)
- Website: rvnl.org

Rail Vikas Nigam Limited (RVNL) is an Indian central Public Sector Undertaking (PSU) which works as the construction arm of the Ministry of Railways for project implementation and transportation infrastructure development. It was incorporated in 2003 to meet the country's surging infrastructural requirements and to implement projects on a fast-track basis as well as for creating a Railway equipment construction company. RVNL is a Navratna PSU in India under the administrative control of the Ministry of Railways, Government of India.

The organization undertakes project execution from concept to commissioning and creates project-specific SPVs. RVNL’s mandate includes the mobilization of extra-budgetary resources (EBRs) through a mix of equity and debts via these SPVs.

== History ==
Rail Vikas Nigam Limited (RVNL) was established to implement the National Rail Vikas Yojana (NRVY), a project to develop railway infrastructure in India. The NRVY was announced by Prime Minister Atal Bihari Vajpayee from the ramparts of the Red Fort during the Independence Day speech on 15 August 2002. The NRVY was formally launched by Vajpayee on 26 December 2002, and RVNL was incorporated under the Companies Act, 1956 on 24 January 2003. RVNL's two main objectives are to augment the capacity of rail infrastructure and raise extra budgetary resources for special purpose vehicle projects.

RVNL opened its initial public offering (IPO) on 29 March 2019. It was the third railways-related PSU to initiate an IPO, after RITES and IRCON. The company offered a 12% stake at a price range of ₹17-₹19 per share. The IPO was subscribed 1.78 times by close on 3 April earning ₹481 crore (US$50 million). RVNL was listed on the Bombay Stock Exchange and the National Stock Exchange on 19 April 2019.

== List of Manufacturing Units ==
Project	Type	Location	Status	Notes
Rail Coach Naveenikaran Karkhana (RCNK) - RVNL	Rail Coach Factory	Sonipat, Haryana	Completed	Rail Vikas Nigam Limited successfully commissioned the Rail Coach Naveenikaran Karkhana at Sonipat, Haryana in October 2021. The Rolling Stock Complex is designed for sustainable development with Industry 4.0 compliant assembly line.Vande Bharat Express production to start in the factory in near future.
Marathwada Rail Coach Factory (MRCF), Latur - RVNL	[[Rail Coach Factory]]	Latur, Maharashtra	Completed	The Marathwada Rail Coach Factory, a project of RVNL in Latur, Maharashtra produced its first coach shell on Good Governance Day i.e. 25.12.2020. This state-of-the-art factory was set up and commissioned in just two years by RVNL to manufacture self-propelled trains for Indian Railways. Vande Bharat Express production to start in the factory in near future.
Railway Manufacturing Unit (RMU)	Wagon Factory	Kazipet, Telangana	Completed	Indian Railways is going to set up a railway wagon manufacturing unit in Telangana. The unit will be constructed on 160 acres of land in Kazipet at an estimated cost of `521 crore and is expected to be completed by February 2025. The Rail Vikas Nigam Limited (RVNL) was entrusted with this project.

== Subsidiaries ==
=== High Speed Rail Corporation of India Limited ===
The High Speed Rail Corporation of India Limited (HSRC) is an SPV which was incorporated in 2012 as a subsidiary of RVNL to implement high-speed rail projects in India.

=== Kinet Railway Solutions Ltd ===
RVNL has incorporated a private company Kinet Railway Solutions Ltd which will act as the SPV that will sign the manufacturing-cum-maintenance agreement with the Ministry of Railways.

== Kyrgyzindustry-RVNL ==
RVNL established a 50:50 joint venture company, named Kyrgyzindustry-RVNL, with Kyrgyz company Kyrgyzindustry. The company will develop rail, road, and other infrastructure in Kyrgyzstan. RVNL informed the Securities and Exchange Board of India (SEBI) of the establishment of the joint venture on 10 December 2022.

== Special Purpose Vehicles ==
=== Kutch Railway Company Ltd ===
RVNL owns 50% equity in this project. The project length is 301 km and is for gauge conversion of Palanpur-Gandhidham section. Currently RVNL is doubling Samakhiali-Palanpur (248 km) anticipating increased traffic flow from Mundra and Deendayal Ports.

=== Bharuch Dahej Railway Co Ltd ===
RVNL is the largest stakeholder in this SPV with 35.46% equity. The project length is 63 km and is for gauge conversion.

=== Krishnapatnam Railway Co Ltd ===
RVNL is the largest stakeholder in this SPV with 49.76% equity. The project length is 113.2 km and is for construction of new line from Obulaparivalli to Krishnapatnam port. Complete connectivity was provided in June 2019.

=== Haridaspur Paradip Railway Co Ltd ===
RVNL is the largest equity shareholder with 30%. This SPV is for a new 82 km line from Haridaspur to Paradip Port. This commercial route became operational on 30.07.2020

=== Angul Sukinda Railway Ltd ===
RVNL is the largest stakeholder in this SPV with 32.16% equity. This is for a new 102.42 km railway line from Angul-Sukinda. 80% of the project has already been completed and the commercial operation will begin shortly.

=== New SPVs under formation ===
==== Indian Port Rail Corporation Limited (IRPCL) ====
RVNL is participating in the formation of IRPCL. This is a SPV under the Ministry of Shipping, with the stakeholders being RVNL and 12 major ports. The initial authorised capital of the SPV is Rs 500 crore with RVNL's equity participation being Rs 10 crore only or 10% of the initial subscribed share capital.

The mandate of the SPV is to enhance rail connectivity to the various Ports in the country. This includes maintenance of Port Railways along with up-gradation, modernisation and capacity augmentation as and when required.

==== Rail connectivity to Rewas Port in Maharashtara ====
RVNL began as an organisation for executing various projects of railway engineering, to meet the shortfall of rail infrastructure that the existing system of that time could not fulfil. It was important to think out of the box and find a solution as eventually the price would be heavy with respect to the curtailment of opportunities and options available to a developing nation.

From beginning with railway capacity augmentation through track doubling, new railway lines, gauge conversion, railway electrification, RVNL has moved onto working on metro railways, multimodal transport system, port connectivity, turnkey projects i.e. workshops, training institutes, green buildings, high speed rail projects, cable stayed bridges, river and road bridges, vertical lift bridge, mountain Railways and tunnels.

== Corporate Social Responsibility ==
Corporate Social Responsibility is a part of the ethos of Rail Vikas Nigam Limited. Aligning its goals to CSR objectives’, RVNL has implemented projects in the thematic areas of Health and Education. The geographic focus of RVNL CSR has been West Bengal, Chhattisgarh, Jharkhand, Uttar Pradesh, Madhya Pradesh, Uttarakhand and Odisha. About 60 per cent of CSR funds are spent in the education & health care sector for the underprivileged, marginalized communities and tribal belts.

== Department of Public Enterprises Ratings ==
Rail Vikas Nigam Limited has been rated as "Excellent" by the Department of Public Enterprises (DPE) for 11 consecutive years. The Company has ranked 1st amongst the Railway PSEs and 3rd amongst PSUs in the country in the latest DPE ratings 2020-2021 with a MoU Score of 99.

Assessment Year	Rating	RVNL’s rank among Railway CPSEs
2007-08	Good	8th
2008-09	Very Good	10th
2009-10	Very Good	7th
2010-11	Excellent	5th
2011-12	Excellent	2nd
2012-13	Excellent	1st
2013-14	Excellent	2nd
2014-15	Excellent	1st
2015-16	Excellent	1st
2016-17	Excellent	1st
2017-18	Excellent	1st
2018-19	Excellent	2nd
2019-20	Excellent	1st
2020-21	Excellent	1st

== Recent Accolades ==
Rail Vikas Nigam Limited team bagged two awards for excellence by Skoch group viz. Gold award for Public-Private Partnership and Silver award for response to Covid in 2022.

Rail Vikas Nigam Limited was conferred the Roll of Honour as the fastest-growing Mini-Ratna of the year by Dalal Street Investment Journal.

== Completed projects ==
The list of 18 projects completed in 2021-22 is as under:

S. No.	Railway	Name of Project	Plan Head	Length (km)
1.	East Coast Railway	Sambalpur-Titlagarh (182 km)	Doubling	182.00
2.	Northern Railway	Utraitia-Raebareli (65.6 km)	Doubling	68.04
3.	Northern Railway	Raebareli-Amethi (60.1 km)	Doubling	59.00
4.	South Central Railway	Vijaywada-Gudivada- Bhimavaram-Narasapur, Gudivada-Machlipatnam and Bhimavaram-Nidadavolu (221 km) - Doubling with electrification	Doubling	221.00
5.	South Central Railway	Secunderabad (Falaknuma)-Mehbubnagar doubling	Doubling	85.70
6.	West Central Railway	Bina-Kota (282.66 km) with RE	Doubling	282.66
7.	Western Railway	Ahmedabad-Botad (170.48 km)	GC	166.09
8.	Western Railway	Dhasa-Jetalsar (104.44 km)	GC	106.69
9.	Railway Electrification	Raninagar Jalpaigudi-New Bongaigaon - Guwahati (Incl) RE (382 km) (Part of Barauni - Katihar - Guwahati Incl. Katihar - Barsoi (836 km) RE	RE	374.98
10.	Railway Electrification	Chikjajur-Bellary RE (184 km)	RE	183.15
11.	Railway Electrification	Bengaluru-Omalur Via Hosur RE (196 km)	RE	196.00
12.	Railway Electrification	Utratia-Raebareli-Amethi 2nd line RE (126 km)	RE	126.00
13.	Deposit	RE of NTPC siding at Hotgi Station (37 km)	RE	34.41
14.	East Central Railway	Gaya -Setting up New MEMU car shed for maintaining 30 rakes of 16 coaches	WKSP	-
15.	Northern Railway	Sonipat-Setting up of coach periodical overhauling and refurbishment workshop	WKSP	-
16.	North Eastern Railway	Saidpur Bhitri- Setting up of Electric Loco Shed to home 200 Locos	WKSP	-
17.	Western Railway	Dhasa-Jetalsar-Subways in lieu of Level Crossing-35 Nos.	RSW	-
18.	South Central Railway	Lallaguda (Carriage Workshop)- Replacement of 100-Year-Old Administrative Building	OSW	-

The list of 102 projects fully completed since inception and up to March 2021 is as under:

S. No.	Railway	Project name	Type of Project	Length (km)
1.	Central Railway	Diva - Kalyan 5th & 6th Line	Doubling	11
2.	Central Railway	Pakni - Mohol Doubling	Doubling	17
3.	Central Railway	Panvel - Jasai JNPT Doubling	Doubling	28.5
4.	Central Railway	Pakni - Solapur Doubling	Doubling	16.28
5.	Eastern Railway	Gurup - Saktigarh Extn of 3rd Line	Doubling	26
6.	East Central Railway	Barauni - Tilrath Bypass Doubling	Doubling	8.3
7.	East Coast Railway	Talcher-Cuttack-Paradeep Doubling with 2nd Bridge on Rivers Birupa & Mahanadi	Doubling	3
8.	East Coast Railway	Jakhapura- Haridaspur 3rd Line	Doubling	23.3
9.	East Coast Railway	Cuttack - Barang Doubling	Doubling	14.3
10.	East Coast Railway	Rajatgarh-Barang Doubling	Doubling	31.3
11.	East Coast Railway	Khurda-Barang - 3rd line (35 km)	Doubling	32.32
12.	Northern Railway	New Delhi-Tilak Bridge- 5th & 6th line (2.65 km)	Doubling	2.65
13.	North Central Railway	Palwal - Bhuteswar 3rd Line	Doubling	81
14.	North Central Railway	Aligarh - Ghaziabad 3rd Line	Doubling	106.1
15.	North Western Railway	Bhagat Ki Kothi - Luni Doubling	Doubling	30.3
16.	North Western Railway	Karjoda - Palanpur Doubling	Doubling	5.4
17.	North Western Railway	Rewari- Manheru Doubling	Doubling	69.02
18.	North Western Railway	Rani-Keshav Ganj Doubling	Doubling	59.5
19.	North Western Railway	Abu Road-Sarotra Road- Patch doubling (23.12 km)	Doubling	23.12
20.	North Western Railway	Swaruganj-Abu Road - Patch doubling (25.36 km)	Doubling	25.36
21.	North Western Railway	Sarotra Road-Karjoda - Patch doubling (23.59 km)	Doubling	23.59
22.	Southern Railway	Attipattu - Korukkupet 3rd Line	Doubling	18
23.	Southern Railway	Pattabiram - Tiruvallur 4th Line & Tiruvallur - Arakkonam 3rd Line	Doubling	41.89
24.	Southern Railway	Tiruvallur - Arakkonam 4th Line	Doubling	28
25.	Southern Railway	Villipuram-Dindigul Doubling	Doubling	273
26.	Southern Railway	Thanjavur-Ponmalai - Doubling	Doubling	46.96
27.	South Central Railway	Pullampet - Balapalle Ph I of Gooty - Renigunta Doubling	Doubling	41
28.	South Central Railway	Krishnapatnam - Venkatachalam Doubling with RE	Doubling	16.5
29.	South Central Railway	Gooty - Renigunta Patch Doubling	Doubling	151
30.	South Central Railway	Raichur - Guntakal Doubling	Doubling	81.0
31.	South Central Railway	Guntur-Tenali - Doubling with electrification (24.38 km)	Doubling	25
32.	South Eastern Railway	Tikiapara - Santragachi Doubling	Doubling	5.6
33.	South Eastern Railway	Panskura - Kharagpur 3rd Line	Doubling	45
34.	South Eastern Railway	Panskura - Haldia Ph 1 Doubling	Doubling	14
35.	South Eastern Railway	Rajgoda - Tamluk (Jn. Cabin) Doubling	Doubling	13.5
36.	South Eastern Railway	Tamluk Jn. Cabin – Basulya Sutahata Doubling	Doubling	24.23
37.	South Eastern Railway	Goelkera-Monoharpur 3rd line (40 km)	Doubling	27.5
38.	South East Central Railway	Bilaspur - Urkura 3rd Line Doubling	Doubling	105
39.	South East Central Railway	Salka Road- Khongsara Patch Doubling	Doubling	26
40.	South East Central Railway	Khodri-Anuppur, with Flyover at Bilaspur (61.6 km)	Doubling	61.6
41.	South Western Railway	Hospet - Guntakal Doubling	Doubling	115
42.	West Central Railway	Bhopal-Bina - 3rd line (143 km)	Doubling	144.3
43.	West Central Railway	Itarsi-Budni - 3rd line (25.090 km)	Doubling	25.09
44.	West Central Railway	Barkhera-Habibganj - 3rd line (41.420 km)	Doubling	41.2
45.	North Western Railway	Delhi - Rewari Gauge Conversion	GC	94.2
46.	North Western Railway	Ajmer - Phulera - Ringus - Rewari Gauge Conversion	GC	295
47.	North Western Railway	Bhildi - Samdari Gauge Conversion	GC	223
48.	Southern Railway	Thanjavur - Villupuram Gauge Conversion	GC	192
49.	Southern Railway	Cuddalore - Salem Gauge Conversion	GC	193
50.	South Western Railway	Arasikere-Hassan-Mangalore Gauge Conversion	GC	230
51.	Western Railway	Bharuch - Samni - Dahej Gauge Conversion	GC	62
52.	Western Railway	Gandhidham - Palanpur Gauge Conversion	GC	301
53.	East Coast Railway	Daitari - Banspani New Line	NL	155
54.	East Coast Railway	Haridaspur-Paradeep (82 km)	New Line	82
55.	Southern Railway	Vallarpadam - Idapally New Line	NL	9
56.	South Central Railway	Obulavaripalle- Krishnapattnam (113 km)	New Line	121
57.	Railway Electrification	Tomka -Banspani – RE	RE	144
58.	Railway Electrification	Kharagpur (Nimpura) - Bhubaneswar Including Branch Line of Talcher - Cuttack - Paradeep	RE	581
59.	Railway Electrification	Bhubaneswar - Kottavalasa	RE	417
60.	Railway Electrification	Daund-Manmad Incl. Puntamba- Shirdi - RE	RE	255
61.	Railway Electrification	Reningunta - Guntakal RE	RE	308
62.	Railway Electrification	Yelahanka - Dharmavaram - Gooty RE	RE	306
63.	Railway Electrification	Bharuch - Samni - Dahej RE	RE	64
64.	Railway Electrification	Manheru- Hissar RE	RE	74
65.	Railway Electrification	Jakhal - Hisar (79 km)	RE	80.0
66.	Railway Electrification	Chhapra-Ballia-Ghazipur-Varanasi-Allahabad RE (330 km)	RE	330
67.	Railway Electrification	Guntakal-Kalluru RE (40 km)	RE	40
68.	Railway Electrification	Utretia - Rae Bareli - Amethi - Janghai RE (214 km)	RE	214
69.	Railway Electrification	Daund-Baramati (44 km)	RE	44
70.	Railway Electrification	Amla-Chhindwara-Kalumna	RE	257
71.	Railway Electrification	Raipur-Titlagarh (203 km) {Part of Vizianagaram - Rayagada - Titlagarh - Raipur (465 km)}	RE	203
72.	Railway Electrification	Rajpura - Dhuri - Lehra Mohabat (151 km)	RE	151
73.	Railway Electrification	Guntakal - Bellary - Hospet incl. Tornagallu - Ranjitpura Branch Line (138 km)	RE	138
74.	Railway Electrification	Wani- Pimpalkutti RE (66 km)	RE	66
75.	Railway Electrification	Manoharabad- Medchal (14 km)	RE	14
76.	Railway Electrification	Yalahanka-Penukonda (120.55 km)-Doubling	RE	-
77.	Railway Electrification	Jakhal - Dhuri - Ludhiana (123 km)	RE	123
78.	Railway Electrification	Guna-Gwalior (227 km)	RE	227
79.	Railway Electrification	Rani-Palanpur 166 km	RE	166
80.	Railway Electrification	Villupuram-Cuddalore Port-Mayiladuthurai-Thanjavur & Mayiladuthurai-Thiruvarur (228 km)	RE	228
81.	Railway Electrification	Raebareli-Unchahar incl. Dalmau-Daryapur (63 km)	RE	63
82.	Central Railway	Latur- Setting up of coach manufacturing factory	WKSP	-
83.	Eastern Railway	Civil Engineering Works in Connection with Diesel Loco Component Factory, Dankuni	WKSP	-
84.	Eastern Railway	Dankuni - Setting Up of Electric Loco Assembly and Ancillary Unit of CLW	WKSP	-
85.	East Central Railway	Barauni - 250 High Horse Power Loco Shed	WKSP	-
86.	East Coast Railway	Vadlapudi- Wagon PoH Workshop of 200 Nos Capacity Near Duvvada Station	WKSP	-
87.	North Central Railway	Kanpur - Construction of MEMU Car shed	WKSP	-
88.	South Eastern Railway	Setting Up of Diesel Multiple Unit (DMU) Manufacturing Factory at Sankrail/ Haldia	WKSP	-
89.	DLW	Varanasi - Augmentation of Production Capacity from 200 To 250 High HP Locos Per Year	WKSP	-
90.	North Eastern Railway	Aunrihar - DEMU Shed	WKSP	-
91.	South Central Railway	Workshop for Manufacture of Flat Bogies for LHB Design Coaches, Yadgir	WKSP	-
92.	METKOL	MM of Existing Corridor Noparanagar-Baranagar- Daksineshwar	MTP	4.14
93.	Eastern Railway	Barddhaman Yard - 4-lane road over bridge in lieu of 2-lane road over bridge No. 213	ROB	-
94.	Southern Railway	Srirangam-Tiruchchirapalli Town - 4-lane road over bridge in lieu of 2- lane bridge No.380-A	ROB	-
95.	North Western Railway	IOC Siding at Salawas (Deposit Work)	Others	2.82
96.	South Central Railway	Secunderabad- Upgradation of facilities at Centralised Training Academy for Railway Accounts	TRG	-
97.	South Central Railway	Moula Ali - Setting Up of Indian Railway Institute of Finance Management	TRG	-
98.	North Western Railway	Madar - Palanpur - Removing of PSR (Kms 589/1 to 590/1)	Track Renewal	-
99.	North Central Railway	Jhansi-Garhmau, Orai-Ata, Ata-Kalpi &Pokhrayan-Lalpur - Splitting of longer block sections	TF	-
100.	North Central Railway	Paman-Bhimsen - New B-class station	TF	-
101.	Western Railway	Sabarmati-Botad-subways in lieu of level crossing-23 Nos.	RSW	-
102.	Western Railway	Sabarmati-Botad-Subways in lieu of LCs-14 Nos.	RSW	-

== Projects Under Implementation ==
There are 72 projects under various stages of implementation by RVNL.

The details of 66 projects assigned to RVNL till March 2021 and which are under implementation are as under:

S. No.	Railway	Name of Project	Plan Head
1	CR & SCR	Daund-Gulbarga - Doubling (224.9 km) and Pune-Guntakal -Electrification (641.37 km)	Doubling
2	ER	Nabadwipghat-Nabadwipdham upto BB loop (9.58 km) {Part of Kalinarayanpur-Krishnanagar with Krishnanagar-Shantipur Nabadwipghat- GC, Krishnanagar-Chartala, MM for Krishnanagar Chapra-NL, Naihati-Ranaghat-3rd line, Nabadwipghat-Nabadwipdham upto BB loop (9.58 km), Ranaghat-Lalgola strengthening (bridge No.2)}	Doubling
3	ER	Dankuni-Furfura Sharif NL {Part of Liluah-Dankuni - 3rd line (10.13 km) with extension to Furfura Sharif}	Doubling
4	ECR	Dhanbad-Sonnagar (Patratu-Sonnagar) - 3rd line (291 km)	Tripling
5	ECoR	Raipur-Titlagarh (203 km), incl new line Mandir Hasaud-Naya Raipur (20 km) and new MM for conversion of Raipur (Kendri)-Dhamtari & Abhanpur-Rajim branch (67.20 km)	Doubling
6	ECoR	Banspani-Daitari-Tomka-Jakhapura (180 km)	Doubling
7	ECoR	Vizianagaram-Sambhalpur (Titlagarh) 3rd line	Tripling
8.	NR	Rajpura-Bhatinda Doubling with Electrification (172.64 km)	Doubling
9.	NR	Janghai-Phaphamau DL with RE (46.79 km)	Doubling
10.	NCR	Bhimsen-Jhansi (206 km) with RE	Doubling
11.	NCR	Mathura-Jhansi 3rd line	Tripling
12.	NER	Varanasi-Madhosingh-Allahabad	Doubling
13.	NER	Bhatni - Aunrihar with electrification (125 km) (excl Indara - Mau (116.95 km))	Doubling
14.	NER	Phephna-Indara, Mau-Shahganj (excl. Indara-Mau) (150.28 km) DL	Doubling
15	SR	Madurai-Maniyachi-Tuticorin Doubling with RE (159 km)	Doubling
16	SR	Maniyachi - Nagarcoil Doubling with RE (102 km)	Doubling
17	SCR	Vijayawada-Gudur 3rd line	Tripling
18	SER	Kharagpur (Nimpura)-Adityapur 3rd line (132 km)	Tripling
19	SWR	Hospet-Hubli-Londa-Tinaighat-Vasco da Gama (352.28 km)	Doubling
20	WR	Palanpur-Samakhiali (247.73 km)	Doubling
21	WCR	Budni-Barkhera - 3rd line (33 km)	Tripling
22	NER	Lucknow-Pilibhit via Sitapur, Lakhimpur (262.76 km)	Gauge Conversion
23	CR	Dighi Port-Roha (33.76 km)	New Line
24	CR	Yevatmal- Nanded (206 km) NL	New Line
25	ECR	Fatuah-Islampur incl. material modification for extension of new line from Neora to Daniawan; Daniawan to Biharsharif; Biharsharif to Barbigha; Barbigha to Sheikhpura	New Line
26	ECoR	Angul-Sukinda Road (98.7 km)	New Line
27	NR	Rishikesh-Karnaprayag (125.09 km)	New Line
28	NR	Bhanupalli-Bilaspur-Beri (63.1 km)	New Line
29	NER	Mau-Ghazipur-Tarighat New Line	New Line
30	SECR	Dallirajhara-Rowghat (90 km) {Part of Dallirajhara-Jagdalpur (235 km)}	New Line
31	WCR	Indore-Jabalpur (342 km) NL sanctioned as Budhni-Indore (205 km)	New Line
32	CORE	Hospet - Hubli - Vasco da Gama (346 km)	RE
33	CORE	Kasganj-Bareilly-Bhojipura-Daliganj RE (401 km)	RE
34	CORE	RE of Sambalpur-Titlagarh Doubling project (96.596 km)	RE
35	CORE	Palanpur-Samakhiali (247.73 km) RE	RE
36	Deposit	Electrification of IOCL Siding at Pakni (4 km)	RE
37	Deposit	Electrification of Ultra Tech Cement Siding at Hotgi (8 km)	RE
38	Deposit	Electrification of Chettinad Cement Siding at Tilati (7.1 km)	RE
39	ER	Ranaghat (EMU Car Shed)-Inspection bay for 15 coach maintenance facilities	WKSP
40	ER	Jheel Siding Coaching Depot- Infrastructure development	WKSP
41	ECoR	Khurda Road - Construction of main line electrical multiple unit car shed (Phase-2)	WSKP
42	NCR	Jhansi-Setting up of coach periodic overhauling and refurbishment workshop	WKSP
43	NER	Dullahapur Yard - Provision of tower wagon periodic overhauling shed	WKSP
44	SCR	Kazipet - Workshop for Wagon Periodical Overhauling	WKSP
45	WR	Vadodara - Setting up of New PoH Shop for Electrical Locos	WKSP
46	SR	Repair of S&T Workshop at Podanur, Tamil Nadu	WKSP
47	ER	Samudragarh-Nabadwipdham - Road over bridge in lieu of level crossing No.14	RSW
48	SCR	New Crossing Station Between Umdanagar-Timmarpur Stations of Secunderabad-Mahabubnagar Section	TFC
49	SR	Manamadurai-Rameswaram - Repl of Full Scherzer Lift Span (Bridge No. 346) (Pamban Viaduct)	BRGW
50	SR	Manamadurai-Rameshwaram - Reconstruction of bridge (Pamban Viaduct) with navigational lift span	BRGW
51	NER	Daraganj - Rebuilding (Bridge No.111 On Ganga)	BRGW
52	NER	Setting Up of Centralised Training Institute for IRSME & IRSS Officers at Lucknow	TRG
53	WR	National Rail & Transportation Institute at Vadodara (NAIR)	TRG
54	WR	Construction of hostels in centralised training institutes (Umbrella Work 2019-20)	TRG
55	SECR	Direct Power Supply from Central Generating Agencies	OEW
56	WCR	Provision of Addl. Traction Substation at Budhni	OEW
57	SWR	New Station Building at Belguam	OSW
58	SWR	Second Entry Station Building at Belguam	OSW
59	SWR	Proposed Coaching Depot at Belgaum	OSW
60	SWR	Yard Remodelling Works at Belgaum	OSW
61	SCR	Multi-Modal Transport System (MMTS) - Phase-II in Hyderabad	MTP
62	SCR	Ghatkesar-Raigir (Yadadri)-Extension of multi modal transportation system Phase-II	MTP
63	MET	Baranagar-Barrackpore & Dakshineswar - Construction of Metro Railway (14.5 km)	MTP
64	MET	Dum Dum Airport-New Garia via Rajerhat - Construction of Metro Railway (32 km) including Naupara (Ex.)-Baranagar (2.6 km) {Part of Dumdum-Baranagar Metro Railway sanctioned as MM to Dumdum-New Garia Metro Railway vide letter No. 96/Proj/C/5/1/Pt. Dated 30.10.09}	MTP
65	MET	Joka-Binoy Badal Dinesh Bagh via Majerhat - Construction of Metro railway (16.72 km) incl material modification for extension from Joka Diamond Park (Phase-I)	MTP
66	NR	Final Location Survey for New Line Connectivity to Char Dham (327 km)	FLS

The list of Railway project assigned to RVNL in 2021-22 and under execution is as under:

S. No.	Railway	Name of Project	Plan Head
1.	WR	Infrastructure up-gradation of Training Institutes at NAIR Campus	TRG

The list of projects awarded to RVNL through Competitive Bidding in 2021-22 and under execution is as under:

S. No.	Agency /Client	Name of Project	Plan Head
1.	MP Metro	Design and Construction of Elevated 10 km Viaduct and 09 Elevated Metro Stations including all Civil, Structural, Roof structure, MEP works, Architectural finishes, Façade, etc for Indore Metro Rail Project.	Metro Works
2.	MP Metro	Design and Construction of 07 Elevated Metro Stations including Structures, Architectural Finishes, E&M Works etc. of Indore Metro Rail Project.	Metro Works
3.	NHIDCL	DPR Preparation for Highways in North-East Region in state of Nagaland for length of 200 KM.	DDC
4.	NHIDCL	DPR Preparation for Highways in North-East Region in state of Nagaland for length of 280 KM.	DDC
5.	NHIDCL	DPR Preparation for Highways in North-East Region in state of Mizoram for length of 740 KM.	DDC

== See also ==
- Indian Railway Finance Corporation, non-banking financial corporation financing Indian railways
