= Central Electronics Limited =

Government of India Enterprise

- Company type: Public sector
- Industry: Engineering
- Founded: 26 June 1974
- Headquarters: New Delhi
- Area served: India
- Key people: Chetan Prakash Jain (Chairman and Managing Director)
- Products: Solar photovoltaic Railway electronics Ceramics
- Revenue: ▲₹639 crore (US$ 24 million) (March 2024)
- Operating income: ▲₹14 crore (US$ 2 million) (2015)
- Website: www.celindia.co.in

Central Electronics Limited is a Government of India Enterprise under the Department of Scientific and Industrial Research (DSIR), Ministry of Science & Technology. It was established in 1974 to commercially exploit indigenous technologies developed by National Laboratories and R&D Institutions in the country.

Union Minister Jitendra Singh Rana bestowed the "Mini RATNA" designation (Category-1) on Central Electronics Limited (CEL) during its Golden Jubilee celebrations.

CEL has developed several products for the first time in the country through its own R&D efforts and in close association with the premier National & International Laboratories, including Defense Laboratories. In recognition of all these efforts, CEL has been awarded a number of times with prestigious awards, including “National Award for R&D by DSIR”.

CEL is a pioneer in the country in the field of Solar Photovoltaic (SPV), and it has developed the technology with its own R&D efforts. Its solar products have been qualified for International Standards IEC 61215/61730.

CEL has also developed axle counter systems that are being used in the Railway signaling system for the safe running of trains. Railway products include Single Section Digital Axle Counters (SSDAC), High Availability SSDAC (HA-SSDAC), Multi-section Digital Axle Counter (MSDAC) & Block Proving by Axle Counter (BPAC) using Universal Fail Safe Block Interface (UFSBI). These products have been designed and developed in accordance with CENELEC standards.

CEL has developed a number of critical components for strategic applications and is supplying these items to Defence.
