= Indian Renewable Energy Development Agency =

Indian public sector enterprise

Indian Renewable Energy Development Agency Limited
- Trade name: IREDA
- Type: Public
- Traded as: NSE: IREDA; BSE: 544026
- Founded: 1987; 39 years ago
- Headquarters: India Habitat Centre, East Court, Core-4A, 1st Floor, Lodi Road, New Delhi, India
- Key people: Jatin Kumar Nayak (Chairman & MD); Bijay Kumar Mohanty (CFO)
- Revenue: ▲₹6,755 crore (US$700 million) (2025)
- Operating income: ▲₹2,103 crore (US$220 million) (2025)
- Net income: ▲₹1,698 crore (US$180 million) (2025)
- Total assets: ▲₹79,734 crore (US$8.3 billion) (2025)
- Total equity: ▲₹10,266 crore (US$1.1 billion) (2025)
- Owner: Government of India (75%)
- Website: www.ireda.in
- Footnotes; Financials as of 31 March 2025.

Indian Renewable Energy Development Agency Limited (IREDA) is an Indian public sector enterprise which provides financial assistance and other services to projects related to renewable sources of energy and energy efficiency/conservation. Formed in 1987, IREDA is a Navratna organisation owned by the Government of India and administratively controlled by the Ministry of New and Renewable Energy (MNRE).

In November 2023, IREDA went public with an initial public offering (IPO), listing on NSE and BSE.

In July 2024, shares of Indian Renewable Energy Development Agency (IREDA) surged the Rs 300 level for the first time, with the stock touching a record high of Rs 304.50 on the NSE.

== Operations ==
Indian Renewable Energy Development Agency Limited is a Public Limited Government Company and a Non-Banking Financial Institution formed with the objective of promoting, developing and extending financial assistance for setting up projects relating to new and renewable sources of energy and energy efficiency/conservation. It is under the administrative control of Ministry of New and Renewable Energy (MNRE).

On 26 April 2024, IREDA was granted "Navratna" status by the Department of Public Enterprises (DPE).

== Objectives and policies ==
- Financing renewable energy projects.
- Supporting green power capacity.
- Financing the setting up of solar manufacturing units.
- Encourage the use of renewable energy to foster sustainable growth.
