= MSTC Limited =

Indian e-commerce company

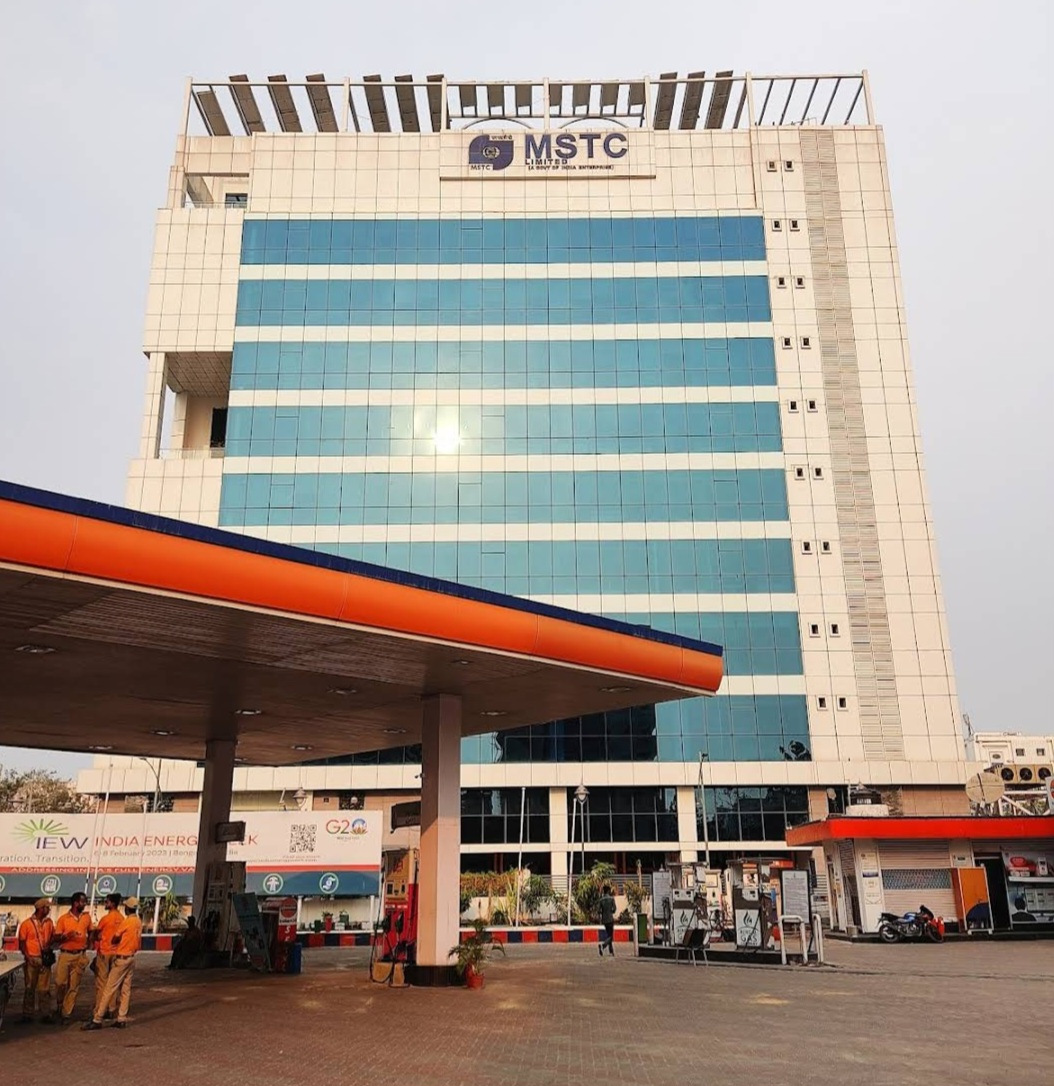
- MSTC Ltd Headquarters in Kolkata
- Native name: MSTC Limited
- Type: Central Public Sector Undertakings
- Traded as: BSE: 542597; NSE: MSTCLTD
- Industry: E-commerce
- Founded: 9 September 1964
- Headquarters: Kolkata
- Key people: Manobendra Ghoshal (Chairman & Managing Director)
- Products: E-auction, e-procurement, e-sales, retail software
- Revenue: ▼₹879.16 crore (US$91 million) (2022)
- Net income: ▲₹199.09 crore (US$21 million) (2022)
- Owner: Ministry of Steel, Government of India
- Website: www.mstcindia.co.in

MSTC Limited (formerly known as Metal Scrap Trade Corporation Limited) is a central public sector undertakings under the Ministry of Steel, Government of India. It is involved in diversified e-commerce services. Its corporate office is in New Delhi, Delhi with regional branch offices in various other cities. The company reported a net profit of INR 112.95 crore for the fiscal year 2020-21. Incorporated on 9 September 1964, MSTC has 344 employees (as on 31 March 2020).

MSTC renders service to various e-commerce sectors, including e-auction, e-procurement, high sea sales, e-sales, and retail software. MSTC had developed software to conduct an online draw for the new LPG distribution ship scheme, which was conducted by state-run oil marketing psu's all over India. MSTC as of 2018 was also in the process of developing an online portal for divestment of state-owned entities through an English auction system.

The PSU has its head office in Kolkata, West Bengal; four regional offices in Kolkata, Delhi, Mumbai, and Chennai; and branch offices in Chandigarh, Jaipur, Vadodara, Bhopal, Bhubaneswar, Guwahati, Bangalore, Lucknow, Ranchi, Raipur, Vizag, Trivandrum, Hyderabad, Patna, and Dehradun. FSNL (Ferro Scrap Nigam Limited) was a subsidiary of MSTC which was disinvested in 2025 to Konoike Transport Co. Ltd, a Japanese corporation for Rs. 320 crores.

== History ==
- 1964 - Incorporated as a regulatory body for the export of scrap.
- 1982 - Independent company under Ministry of Steel.
- 2002 - Awarded Miniratna Category-II status.
- 2004 - Started auctioning of coal.
- 2005 - Awarded Miniratna Category-I status.
- 2007 - Started e-auction of manganese ore.
- 2011 - Started e-auction of iron ore in Karnataka and human hair.
- 2012 - Started e-auction of chrome ore, baryte, raw pet coke.
- 2013 - Started e-auction of forest products.
- 2014 - Started e-auction of iron ore in Goa and red sanders wood in Andhra Pradesh.
- 2015 - E-auction of coal mine blocks and regassified LNG.
- 2016 - Developed e-bidding platform under DDUGJY & IPDS, DEEP and allocation of marginal oil field.
- 2017 - Developed ERAKAM portal to provide e-auction platform to sell agricultural produce.
- 2018 - Developed Online LPG Distributorship Draw Software for Oil Marketing Companies.

== Presence in India ==
MSTC is headquartered in New Town, Kolkata.

MSTC have offices at 21 locations across India. There are four regional offices, 13 branch offices and 1 site office Patna (Bihar).

- Regional Offices: ERO at Kolkata, WRO at Mumbai, SRO at Chennai and NRO at New Delhi.
- Branch offices: Ranchi, Guwahati, Bhubaneswar, Lucknow, Chandigarh, Bhopal, Raipur, Jaipur, Vadodara, Bangalore, Trivandrum, Vizag and Hyderabad.
- Site offices: Patna (Bihar)

== Ownership ==
The company is under the administrative control of Ministry of Steel, Govt. of India. Currently 64.75% share of the company is held by Govt. of India.

== CERO ==
CERO is a joint venture of MSTC Ltd. and Mahindra Accelo. This Joint Venture company has set up the first auto shredding plant in India for recycling end of life vehicles and other white goods by converting these into shredded scrap which is a vital raw material of secondary steel plants, located in Greater Noida.

== Financials ==
MSTC reported total income of Rs 879.16 crores during the financial year ended March 31, 2023, as compared to Rs 1123.32 crores during the financial year ended March 31, 2022. The company has posted a net profit of Rs 241.9567 crores for the financial year ended March 31, 2023, as against a net profit of Rs 199.0958 crores for the financial year ended March 31, 2022.

== Awards ==
- Kolkata Best Employer Brand Awards 2017 by Employer Branding Institute, India
