= Public Sector Undertakings in India =

Government-owned entities in India

Public Sector Undertakings (PSU) in India are enterprises in which at least 51% of the stake in the corporation is under the ownership of the Government of India or state governments. These types of firms can also be a joint venture of multiple PSUs. These entities perform commercial functions on behalf of the government. Depending on the level of government ownership, PSUs are officially classified into two categories: Central Public Sector Undertakings (CPSUs), owned by the central government or other CPSUs; and State Public Sector Undertakings (SPSUs), owned by state governments. CPSU and SPSU is further classified into Strategic Sector and Non-Strategic Sector. Depending on their financial performance and progress, CPSUs are granted the status of Maharatna, Navaratna, and Miniratna (Category I and II).

Following India's independence in 1947, the limited pre-existing industries were insufficient for sustainable economic growth. The Industrial Policy Resolution of 1956, adopted during the Second Five-Year Plan, laid the framework for PSUs. The government initially prioritized strategic sectors, such as communication, irrigation, chemicals, and heavy industries, followed by the nationalisation of corporations. PSUs subsequently expanded into consumer goods production and service areas like contracting, consulting, and transportation. Their goals include increasing exports, reducing imports, fostering infrastructure development, driving economic growth, and generating job opportunities. Each PSU has its own recruitment rules and employment in PSUs is highly sought after in India due to high pay and its job security, with most preferring candidates with a GATE score. These jobs are very well known for very high pay scale compared to other Government jobs such as UPSC, facilities such as bungalow, pensions and other subsidized facility and for also very good planned townships settlement life. A PSU non-executives such as workers have a huge payscale difference compared to private sector.

In 1951, there were five PSUs under the ownership of the government. By March 2021, the number of such government entities had increased to 365. These government entities represented a total investment of about ₹16,410,000,000,000 as of 31 March 2019. Their total paid-up capital as of 31 March 2019 stood at about ₹200.76 lakh crore. CPSEs have earned a revenue of about ₹24,430,000,000,000 + ₹1,000,000,000,000 during the financial year 2018–19.

== History ==
=== Soviet model ===
When India achieved independence in 1947, it was primarily an agrarian entity, with a weak industrial base. There were only eighteen state-owned Indian Ordnance Factories, previously established to reduce the dependency of the British Indian Army on imported arms.

The British Raj had previously elected to leave agricultural production to the Private sector, with tea processing firms, jute mills (such as the Acland Mill), railways, electricity utilities, banks, coal mines, and steel mills being just some of the economic entities largely owned by private individuals like the industrialist Jamsetji Tata. Other entities were listed on the Bombay Stock Exchange.

Critics of private ownership of India's agricultural and industrial entities—most notably Mahatma Gandhi's independence movement—instead advocated for a self-sufficient, largely agrarian, communal village-based existence for India in the first half of the 20th century. Other contemporary criticisms of India's public sector targeted the lack of well-funded schools, public libraries, universities, hospitals and medical and engineering colleges; a lack seen as impeding an Indian replication of Britain's own industrialization in the previous century.

Post-Independence, the national consensus turned in favor of rapid industrialisation of the economy, a process seen as the key to economic development, improved living standards and economic sovereignty. Building upon the Bombay Plan, which noted the necessity of government intervention and regulation in the economy, the first Industrial Policy Resolution announced in 1948 laid down in broad strokes such a strategy of industrial development. Later, the Planning Commission was formed by a cabinet resolution in March 1950 and the Industrial (Development and Regulation) Act was enacted in 1951 with the objective of empowering the government to take necessary steps to regulate industry.

The first Prime Minister of India, Jawaharlal Nehru, promoted an economic policy based on import substitution industrialisation and advocated a mixed economy. He believed that the establishment of basic and heavy industry was fundamental to the development and modernisation of the Indian economy. India's second five year plan (1956–60) and the Industrial Policy Resolution of 1956 emphasized the development of public sector enterprises to meet Nehru's national industrialisation policy. His vision was carried forward by V. Krishnamurthy, a figure known as the "Father of Public sector undertakings in India". Indian statistician Prasanta Chandra Mahalanobis was instrumental to its formulation, which was later termed the Feldman–Mahalanobis model.

In 1969, Indira Gandhi's government nationalised fourteen of India's largest private banks, and an additional six in 1980. This government-led industrial policy, with corresponding restrictions on private enterprise, was the dominant pattern of Indian economic development until the 1991 Indian economic crisis. After the crisis, the government began divesting its ownership of several PSUs to raise capital and privatize companies facing poor financial performance and low efficiency.

=== Rise of Dirigisme after 1991 reforms ===
After liberalisation in 1991, India shifted from a mixed planned led Soviet model to a more market-oriented dirigisme economy with indicative planning. The 1991 reforms led to formation of pseudo-state owned companies by Government of India such as NSE, NSDL, CRISIL, IL&FS, IDFC etc. which were joint-venture of Public Sector Undertakings(PSUs) and controlling stake(>25%) owned by PSUs as a protectionist policy to lead the market reforms instead of invisible free-hand of free market.The Eighth Five Year Plan (1992 - 1997) adopted Indicative Planning in India. The Eighth Five Year Plan (1992 - 1997) managed the transition from a centrally planned economy to a market led economy through indicative planning and public sector.According to government data, 96 new CPSEs were incorporated between 2014 and 2022.

== Management and classification ==
The public sector undertakings are headed by the head of board of directors also known as chairperson cum managing director cum chief executive officer and a vice chairperson cum deputy managing director cum co-chief executive officer along with the members of the board of directors also known as executive director cum c-level officer who are Group 'A' gazetted officers appointed by the President of India in case of central public sector undertakings, its subsidiaries & its divisions and appointed by the Governor of States of India in case of state public sector undertakings, its subsidiaries & its divisions.

All of the public sector undertakings have been awarded additional financial autonomy. Public Sector Undertakings are government establishments that have comparative advantages", giving them greater autonomy to compete in the global market so as to "support [them] in their drive to become global giants". Financial autonomy was initially awarded to nine PSUs as Navratna status in 1997. Originally, the term Navaratna meant a talisman composed of nine precious gems. Later, this term was adopted in the courts of the Gupta emperor Vikramaditya and Mughal emperor Akbar, as the collective name for nine extraordinary courtiers at their respective courts.

In 2010, the central government established the higher Maharatna category, which raises a public sector unit's investment ceiling from ₹1,000 crore to ₹5,000 crores. The Maharatna public sector units can now decide on investments of up to 15 per cent of their net worth in a project while the Navaratna companies could invest up to ₹1,000 crore without explicit government approval. Two categories of Miniratnas afford less extensive financial autonomy.

Guidelines for awarding Ratna status are as follows:

Category	Eligibility	Benefits for investment
Maharatna (transl. "Great Jewel" or "Mega Jewel")	Three years with an average annual net profit of over ₹2,500 crores, OR The average annual Net worth of ₹10,000 crores for three years, OR Average annual Turnover of ₹20,000 crore for three years (against Rs 25,000 crore prescribed earlier)	₹1,000 crore – ₹5,000 crores, or free to decide on investments up to 15% of their net worth in a project
Navaratna (transl. "Nine Jewels")	A score of 60 (out of 100), based on six parameters which include net profit, net worth, total manpower cost, the total cost of production, cost of services, PBDIT (Profit Before Depreciation, Interest, and Taxes), capital employed, etc., AND A PSU must first be a Miniratna and have 4 independent directors on its board before it can be made a Navratna.	up to ₹1,000 crore or 15% of their net worth on a single project or 30% of their net worth in the whole year (not exceeding ₹1,000 crores).
Miniratna Category-I (transl. "Small Jewel" or "Mini Jewel" Category-I)	Have made profits continuously for the last three years or earned a net profit of ₹30 crores or more in one of the three years	up to ₹500 crore or equal to their net worth, whichever is lower.
Miniratna Category-II (transl. "Small Jewel" or "Mini Jewel" Category-II)	Have made profits continuously for the last three years and should have a positive net worth.	up to ₹300 crores or up to 50% of their net worth, whichever is lower.

PSUs in India are also categorized based on their special non-financial objectives and are registered under Section 8 of Companies Act, 2013 (erstwhile Section 25 of Companies Act, 1956).

== Top profit making CPSUs ==
Top Profit Making CPSUs in Financial Year 2021–22
S. No.	CPSE Name	Net Profit (₹ crore)	Share (%)
1	Oil and Natural Gas Corporation Limited (ONGC)	40,305	15.27
2	Indian Oil (IOCL)	24,184	9.16
3	Power Grid Corporation of India (PGCIL)	17,074	6.48
4	NTPC Limited	16,111	6.11
5	Steel Authority of India Limited (SAIL)	12,015	4.55
6	Coal India Limited (CIL)	11,202	4.24
7	GAIL (India) Limited	10,364	3.93
8	REC Limited	10,046	3.81
9	Power Finance Corporation Limited (PFC)	10,022	3.80
10	NMDC Limited	9,398	3.56
Total (1-10)		1,60,742	60.91
	Other CPSEs	1,03,153	39.09
Aggregated profit of profit-making CPSEs		2,63,895	100

== List of CPSUs ==
Public Sector Undertakings (PSUs) can be classified as Central Public Sector Undertakings (CPSUs) or State Public Sector Undertakings (SPSUs). CPSUs are administered by the Ministry of Heavy Industries. The Department of Public Enterprises (DPE), Ministry of Finance is the nodal department for all the Central Public Sector Undertakings (CPSUs).

As of 2025, there are 14 Maharatnas, 26 Navratnas and 65 Miniratnas (divided into Category 1 and Category 2).

=== List of Maharatna ===
1. Oil and Natural Gas Corporation (ONGC)
2. Bharat Heavy Electricals Limited (BHEL)
3. Bharat Petroleum (BPCL)
4. Coal India (CIL)
5. GAIL (India) Limited (formerly Gas Authority of India Limited)
6. Hindustan Petroleum (HPCL)
7. Indian Oil (IOCL)
8. NTPC Limited (formerly National Thermal Power Corporation)
9. Power Grid Corporation of India (PGCIL)
10. Power Finance Corporation Limited (PFC)
11. REC Limited (formerly Rural Electrification Corporation Limited)
12. Steel Authority of India Limited (SAIL)
13. Oil India (OIL)
14. Hindustan Aeronautics Limited (HAL)

=== List of Navratna ===
1. Bharat Electronics (BEL)
2. Container Corporation of India (CONCOR)
3. Engineers India (EIL)
4. Mahanagar Telephone Nigam Limited (MTNL)
5. National Aluminium Company (NALCO)
6. NBCC (India) Limited
7. NMDC Limited
8. NLC India Limited (Neyveli Lignite)
9. Rashtriya Ispat Nigam (RINL)
10. Shipping Corporation of India (SCI)
11. Rail Vikas Nigam (RVNL)
12. ONGC Videsh Limited (OVL)
13. Rashtriya Chemicals and Fertilizers (RCF)
14. Ircon International (IRCON)
15. RITES Limited
16. National Fertilizers Limited (NFL)
17. Housing And Urban Development Corporation Limited (HUDCO)
18. Indian Renewable Energy Development Agency (IREDA)
19. Central Warehousing Corporation (CWC)
20. Mazagon Dockyard Limited (MDL)
21. RailTel Corporation of India Limited (RCIL)
22. SJVN Limited (SJVN)
23. National Hydroelectric Power Corporation Limited (NHPC)
24. Solar Energy Corporation of India (SECI)
25. Indian Railway Catering and Tourism Corporation (IRCTC)
26. Indian Railway Finance Corporation (IRFC)
27. Numaligarh Refinery (NRL)
28. Chennai Petroleum Corporation Limited (CPCL)
29. Garden Reach Shipbuilders & Engineers Limited (GRSE)

=== List of Miniratna ===
Miniratna Category-I

1. Airports Authority of India (AAI)
2. ONGC Videsh Limited
3. Antrix Corporation (ANTRIX)
4. Balmer Lawrie
5. Braithwaite & Co.
6. Bharat Coking Coal Limited (BCCL)
7. Bharat Dynamics Limited (BDL)
8. Bharat Earth Movers Limited (BEML)
9. Bharat Sanchar Nigam Limited (BSNL)
10. Bridge and Roof Company (India)
11. Central Electronics Limited (CEL)
12. Central Coalfields Limited (CCL)
13. Central Mine Planning & Design Institute Limited
14. Mishra Dhatu Nigam Limited (MIDHANI)
15. Chennai Petroleum Corporation (CPCL)
16. Cochin Shipyard (CSL)
17. Cotton Corporation of India Limited (CCIL)
18. EdCIL (India) Limited (EdCIL)
19. Garden Reach Shipbuilders & Engineers (GRSE) (to be upgraded to Navratna)
20. Goa Shipyard (GSL)
21. Hindustan Copper (HCL)
22. HLL Lifecare
23. Hindustan Newsprint
24. Hindustan Paper Corporation Limited
25. Hindustan Steelworks Construction Ltd.
26. HSCC India Limited
27. Indian Tourism Development Corporation (ITDC)
28. Indian Rare Earths (IRE)
29. India Trade Promotion Organisation (ITPO)
30. Kudremukh Iron Ore Company (KIOCL)
31. Mahanadi Coalfields (MCL)
32. MOIL Limited (MOIL)
33. Mangalore Refinery and Petrochemicals Limited (MRPL)
34. Mineral Exploration Corporation Limited (MECL)
35. Mishra Dhatu Nigam
36. MMTC Ltd. (MMTC)
37. MSTC Limited
38. National Fertilizers (NFL)
39. National Projects Construction Corporation
40. National Small Industries Corporation (NSIC)
41. National Seed Corporation (NSC)
42. Northern Coalfields (NCL)
43. North Eastern Electric Power Corporation Limited (NEEPCL)
44. Pawan Hans Helicopters Limited
45. Projects and Development India Limited (PDIL)
46. Rashtriya Chemicals & Fertilizers (RCF)
47. Security Printing and Minting Corporation of India
48. South Eastern Coalfields (SECL)
49. Telecommunications Consultants India (TCIL)
50. THDC India Limited
51. Western Coalfields (WCL)
52. WAPCOS Limited

Miniratna Category-II (9)

1. Artificial Limbs Manufacturing Corporation of India
2. Broadcast Engineering Consultants India Limited
3. Engineering Projects (India) Limited
4. FCI Aravali Gypsum and Minerals (India) Limited
5. HMT International Limited
6. Indian Medicines Pharmaceutical Corporation Limited
7. Ferro Scrap Nigam Limited (FSNL)
8. MECON
9. National Film Development Corporation of India (NFDC)
10. Rajasthan Electronics and Instruments Limited

=== List of Other CPSUs ===
1. Advanced Weapons and Equipment India
2. Agrinnovate India Ltd.
3. AFC India Limited
4. Anushakti Vidhyut Nigam Limited
5. Aravali Power Company Private Limited (APCPL) Jharli, Jhajjar
6. Armoured Vehicles Nigam
7. Bengal Chemicals and Pharmaceuticals Limited
8. Bengal Immunity Limited
9. Bisra Stone Lime Company Limited
10. Bharat Broadband Network (BBNL)
11. Bharat Coal Gasification and Chemicals Ltd (BCGCL)
12. Bharat Gold Mines Limited
13. Bharat Immunologicals and Biologicals Corporation
14. Bharat Refractories Limited, Bokaro
15. Bharat Wagon and Engineering
16. Bharatiya Reserve Bank Note Mudran
17. BHAVINI
18. BEML Midwest ltd.
19. BHEL Electrical Machines Ltd. (EML)
20. Bhor Sagar Port Limited
21. Biotech Consortium India Limited
22. Brahmaputra Valley Fertilizer Corporation Ltd (BVFCL)
23. Brahmaputra Cracker and Polymer Limited
24. BrahMos Aerospace
25. Bundelkhand Saur Urja Limited
26. Convergence Energy Services Limited
27. CSC e-Governance Services India Limited
28. Cement Corporation of India
29. Central Inland Water Transport Corporation Limited (CIWTC)
30. Central Transmission Utility of India Limited (CTUIL)
31. Certification Engineers International Limited
32. City and Industrial Development Corporation
33. Chenab Valley Power Projects
34. Damodar Valley Corporation (DVC)
35. Dedicated Freight Corridor Corporation of India
36. Delhi Metro Rail Corporation (DMRC)
37. Delhi Transco Limited
38. Delhi Transport Corporation
39. Deposit Insurance and Credit Guarantee Corporation
40. Digital India Corporation
41. Dredging Corporation of India
42. Electronics Corporation of India Limited (ECIL)
43. Energy Efficiency Services Limited (EESL)
44. Employees State Insurance Corporation
45. Export Credit Guarantee Corporation of India
46. Fertilisers and Chemicals Travancore Limited
47. Fertilizer Corporation of India
48. Food Corporation of India (FCI)
49. Fresh & Healthy Enterprises Limited
50. Gliders India
51. Green Gas Limited
52. Green Valley Renewable Energy Limited
53. Grid Conductors Ltd
54. Hemisphere Properties India Limited
55. High Speed Rail Corporation of India Limited
56. Hindustan Antibiotics Limited
57. Hindustan Fertilizers Corporation Limited (HFCL)
58. Hindustan Insecticides
59. Hindustan Organic Chemicals Limited (HOCL)
60. Hindustan Prefab Limited
61. Hindustan Salts Limited
62. Hindustan Shipyard Limited (HSL)
63. Hindustan Teleprinters Limited (HTL)
64. Hindustan Urvarak and Rasayan Limited
65. Hindustan Vegetable Oils Corporation
66. HSCC (India) Limited
67. IHB Limited (a joint venture of IOCL, HPCL & BPCL)( pawan singh)
68. Indian Dairy Machinery Company Ltd. (IDMC)
69. India Debt Resolution Company Limited (IDRCL)
70. India Government Mint
71. India Infrastructure Finance Company Limited (IIFCL)
72. India Optel
73. India Ports Global Limited
74. India SME Asset Reconstruction Company Limited
75. Indian Financial Technology and Allied Services
76. Indian Highway Management Company Limited (IHMCL)
77. Indian Immunologicals Limited
78. Indian Medicine Pharmaceutical Corporation Ltd.
79. Indian Port Rail Corporation Limited(IPRCL)
80. Indian Potash Limited
81. Indian Strategic Petroleum Reserves Ltd
82. Indian Vaccine Corporation Limited
83. Indraprastha Gas Limited
84. Indradhanush Gas Grid Limited (IGGL)
85. Infrastructure Leasing & Financial Services
86. Industrial Finance Corporation of India Limited
87. Inland & Coastal Shipping Ltd.
88. Inland Waterways Authority of India
89. Instrumentation Limited
90. Intelligent Communication Systems India Limited (ICSIL)
91. Irrigation and Water Resources Finance Corporation Limited
92. Jal Power Corporation Ltd.
93. Jute Corporation of India
94. Karnataka Soaps and Detergents Limited
95. Karnataka Vijayanagar Steel Limited, NMDC Steel
96. Khadi Natural
97. Khanij Bidesh India Ltd.
98. Kolkata Metro Rail Corporation
99. Konkan Railway Corporation
100. Konkan LNG
101. Krishnapatnam Railway Company Limited
102. Life Spring Hospitals (P) Ltd.
103. Madras Fertilizers
104. Mahanagar Gas
105. Millennium Telecom Ltd.
106. Meja Urja Nigam Private Limited (MUNPL)
107. National Capital Region Transport Corporation
108. National Highways and Infrastructure Development Corporation Limited (NHIDCL)
109. National Highways Logistics Management Company
110. National High Power Test Laboratory (NHTPL)
111. Narmada Hydroelectric Development Corporation
112. National Internet Exchange of India
113. National Industrial Corridor Development Corporation Limited
114. National Informatics Centre Services Inc. (NIC)
115. National Jute Manufactures Corporation Limited
116. National Land Monetisation Corporation (NLMC)
117. National Payments Corporation of India (NPCI)
118. National Projects Construction Corporation Ltd (NPCC)
119. National Textile Corporation
120. NIIF Infrastructure Finance Limited
121. NewSpace India Limited
122. NEPA Mills Ltd.
123. National Stock Exchange of India
124. NSEIT
125. NSPCL (NTPC- SAIL Power Company Limited)
126. Open Network for Digital Commerce
127. Orissa Drugs & Chemicals Ltd (ODCL)
128. Petronet LNG
129. Pipavav Railway Corporation Ltd. (PRCL)
130. Power System Operation Corporation
131. Praga Tools
132. Prize Petroleum Company Limited
133. Protean eGov Technologies Ltd (Formerly NSDL e-Governance Infrastructure Limited)
134. PTC India (formerly Power Trading Corporation India Limited)
135. Punjab Logistics Infrastructure Limited
136. Railway Energy Management Company Limited (REMCL)
137. Rajasthan Drugs & Pharmaceuticals Limited (RDPL)
138. Ramagundam Fertilizers and Chemicals Limited
139. Ratnagiri Gas and Power
140. Ratle Hydroelectric Power Corporation (RHPC)
141. Receivables Exchange of India Ltd (RXIL)
142. Sagar Mala Development Company
143. Semiconductor Complex Limited
144. Smith Stanisteet Pharmaceuticals Limited
145. Sethusamudram Corporation Limited
146. Security Printing and Minting Corporation of India
147. Sponge Iron India Ltd (SIIL)
148. STCI Finance Limited
149. State Farms Corporation of India
150. Talcher Fertilizers Limited.
151. Tourism Finance Corporation Of India Ltd.
152. The Industrial Credit Company Limited
153. UTI Infrastructure Technology and Services Limited (UTIITSL)
154. Triveni Structurals Limited
155. Utkarsha Aluminium Dhatu Nigam Limited
156. UV Asset Reconstruction Company Limited
157. Indo-Russia Rifles (IRRPL)
158. Munitions India
159. Troop Comforts
160. Yantra India
161. Tusco Limited.

== List of CPSUs privatized ==
- STCI Finance Ltd, Reserve Bank of India divested in 1997
- Bharat Aluminium Company – sold to Vedanta Limited in 2000
- Modern Food Industries – sold to Hindustan Unilever in 2000
- CMC Limited – sold to Tata Consultancy Services in 2001, merged with TCS in 2016
- Lagan Engineering – in 2001
- Hindustan Zinc Limited – sold to Vedanta Limited in 2001
- HTL Limited - sold to HFCL in 2001
- Paradeep Phosphates Limited(PPL) - sold to Adventz Group in 2001
- Videsh Sanchar Nigam Limited – sold to Tata Group in 2002
- ICICI Bank, ICICI Ltd. a government entity, parent company of ICICI Bank was merged with ICICI Bank leading to its privatization in 2002.
- Indian Petrochemicals Corporation Limited – sold to Reliance Industries in 2002 and merged with reliance in 2007.
- Maruti Udyog Limited - sold to Suzuki in 2003 through IPO
- Jessop & Company – sold to Ruia Group in 2003 but bankrupt in 2013
- IDFC in 2005 via IPO cutdown ownership from 100% to 34.91%
- Axis Bank, split from UTI was privatized in 2007
- Air India – sold to Tata Group in 2021
- Neelachal Ispat Nigam Limited - sold to Tata Steel Long Products in 2022
- IDFC First Bank In 2024 IDFC, a Government of India entity merged into its subsidiary IDFC First Bank that led to privatization of the bank. According to Parliamentary report, Before 2024 IDFC-IDFC First Bank merger, Government of India held majority controlling stake of IDFC.
- Ferro Scrap Nigam Limited sold to Konoike Transport Co. Ltd. of Japan in 2025.
- Indian Medicines Pharmaceutical Corporation Ltd (IMPCL) sold to Skymap Pharmaceutical Pvt Limited in 2026
- IDBI Bank - sold to Fairfax Financial in 2026

== List of companies nationalized ==
- IL&FS
- Vodafone Idea

== List of Central PSUs (Financial Services) ==
=== Nationalised banks ===
Currently there are 12 Nationalised Banks in India (Government Shareholding power is denoted in %, as of 30 September 2024):

- State Bank of India (57.51%)
- Bank of Baroda (63.97%)
- Union Bank of India (74.76%)
- Punjab National Bank (70.08%)
- Canara Bank (62.93%)
- Punjab and Sind Bank (98.25%)
- Indian Bank (73.84%)
- Bank of Maharashtra (86.46%)
- Bank of India (73.38%)
- Central Bank of India (93.08%)
- Indian Overseas Bank (96.38%)
- UCO Bank (95.39%)

=== Regional rural banks ===
Currently there are 28 Regional Rural Banks in India, as of 1 May 2025:

Andhra Pradesh

- Andhra Pradesh Grameena Bank

Arunachal Pradesh

- Arunachal Pradesh Rural Bank

Assam

- Assam Gramin Vikash Bank

Bihar

- Bihar Gramin Bank

Chhattisgarh

- Chhattisgarh Rajya Gramin Bank

Gujarat

- Gujarat Gramin Bank

Haryana

- Sarva Haryana Gramin Bank

Himachal Pradesh

- Himachal Pradesh Gramin Bank

Jammu and Kashmir

- Jammu and Kashmir Grameen Bank

Jharkhand

- Jharkhand Rajya Gramin Bank

Karnataka

- Karnataka Grameena Bank

Kerala

- Kerala Gramin Bank

Madhya Pradesh

- Madhya Pradesh Gramin Bank

Maharashtra

- Maharashtra Gramin Bank

Manipur

- Manipur Rural Bank

Meghalaya

- Meghalaya Rural Bank

Mizoram

- Mizoram Rural Bank

Nagaland

- Nagaland Rural Bank

Odisha

- Odisha Grameen Bank

Puducherry

- Puduvai Bharathiar Grama Bank

Punjab

- Punjab Gramin Bank

Rajasthan

- Rajasthan Gramin Bank

Tamil Nadu

- Tamil Nadu Grama Bank

Telangana

- Telangana Grameena Bank

Tripura

- Tripura Gramin Bank

Uttar Pradesh

- Uttar Pradesh Gramin Bank

Uttarakhand

- Uttarakhand Gramin Bank

West Bengal

- West Bengal Gramin Bank

=== Nationalized insurance companies ===
Currently there are 7 Nationalized Insurance Companies (Government Shareholding power denoted in %, as of 1 April 2020):

- Life Insurance Corporation(96.50%)
- General Insurance Corporation of India (85.78%)
- New India Assurance (85.44%)
- National Insurance Company(100%)
- The Oriental Insurance Company(100%)
- United India Insurance Company(100%)
- Agriculture Insurance Company of India(100%)

=== Nationalized Market exchanges ===
- Bombay Stock Exchange
- Metropolitan Stock Exchange
- Multi Commodity Exchange
- National Commodity and Derivatives Exchange
- National Stock Exchange of India

== List of State PSUs ==
=== Maharashtra ===
- Maharashtra Industrial Township Limited

=== West Bengal ===
- West Bengal State Electricity Distribution Company Limited (WBSEDCL)
- West Bengal State Electricity Transmission Company Limited (WBSETCL)
- West Bengal Power Development Corporation Limited (WBPDCL)

== See also ==
- Dirigisme
- Privatisation of public sector undertakings in India
- State ownership
  - State-owned enterprise (SOE), American and global term for similar to PSU
  - State-owned enterprises of China, Chinese SOE/PSU
  - List of government-owned companies
  - Wikipedia categorises
    - Government-owned companies by country (category)
    - Lists of companies (category)
  - List of privatizations
- Indian company law
