= West Bengal State Electricity Board =

Former state-level regulatory body in India

West Bengal State Electricity Board পশ্চিমবঙ্গ রাজ্য বিদ্যুৎ পর্ষদ
- Company type: State Government Electricity Board
- Industry: Power
- Founded: 1 May 1955
- Fate: Unbundled into WBSEDCL & WBSETCL on 1 April 2007
- Successors: West Bengal State Electricity Distribution Company; West Bengal State Electricity Transmission Company
- Headquarters: Kolkata, West Bengal, India
- Area served: West Bengal, India
- Products: Electricity
- Owner: Department of Power, Government of West Bengal

West Bengal State Electricity Board (WBSEB) was a state government electricity regulation board in West Bengal in India. It was formed on 1 May 1955. In 2007, the Government of West Bengal unbundled the erstwhile WBSEB into two companies namely West Bengal State Electricity Distribution Company (WBSEDCL) and West Bengal State Electricity Transmission Company (WBSETCL). The two enterprises were formed on 1 April 2007 under the provisions of West Bengal Power Reform Scheme, 2007.

WBSETCL is responsible for transmitting power at 66 kV, 132 kV, 220 kV and 400 kV in the state of West Bengal. WBSETCL achieved the Best Power Availability Award (Gold Shield) for the year 2007–2008 as a transmission licensee in India from Ministry of Power Government of India.

WBSEDCL is responsible for distributing power in the state of power at 33 kV level and below. West Bengal State Electricity Distribution Company Limited has come into effect from 1 April 2007 after restructuring of erstwhile West Bengal State Electricity Board in compliance of Electricity Act 2003. WBSEDCL is a major power utility of the state with consumer strength over 1.97 crore. 6 zones, 19 regional offices, 67 distribution divisions and 490 customer care centers make up the backbone to the power distribution system of the state. WBSEDCL is divided into 6 zones: Kolkata, Burdwan, Midnapore, Berhampore, Malda and Siliguri.

== See also ==
West Bengal Power Development Corporation Limited
