= EdCIL =

Indian public-sector company

EdCIL (India) Limited
- Type: Public company
- Industry: Education
- Founded: 17 June 1981
- Headquarters: Noida, India
- Area served: Worldwide
- Key people: Manoj Kumar (Chairman & Managing Director), Dr. Uttam Sapate (Executive Director)
- Services: Consulting
- Owner: Government of India
- Website: www.edcilindia.co.in

EdCIL (India) Limited or simply EdCIL (earlier known as Educational Consultants India Limited) is a Public Sector Undertaking in India under the administrative control of the Ministry of Education, India. It is a Miniratna-I category company. EdCIL offers management and consultancy services in all areas of education and human resource development, both within India and overseas.

== History ==
EdCIL was incorporated as a Public Sector enterprise by the Government of India in 1981. In 2018, the company adopted a new logo.

== Organisational structure ==
The Chairperson and Managing Director (CMD) is assisted by two executive directors. The board of directors consists of two representatives from the Government of India, two independent directors and the CMD.

== Operations ==
EdCIL has been primarily working in the domain of online assessment, educational infrastructure and procurement, digital education, and preparation of Detailed Project Report (DPR) for educational institutions. It has laid down blueprints for majority of eminent engineering and management institutions of India namely IITs, IIMs, and IISERs.

The Government of India has designated EdCIL to implement Study in India educational campaign. The Study in India program aims to make India a preferred destination for higher education. EdCIL has worked for providing consultancy to Asian Development Bank (ADB). Previously, it had completed projects in various countries including Tanzania, Zanzibar, Rwanda and Ghana. It has commissioned projects for skill development and education quality improvement in India under supervision of the World Bank.

Since 2018, EdCIL has been executing a smart classroom project in the Republic of Mauritius for primary schools.
