= Bridge and Roof Company (India) =

Indian company

- Type: State-owned enterprise
- Industry: Construction
- Founded: 1920; 106 years ago
- Headquarters: Kolkata, India
- Owner: Government of India
- Website: https://www.bridgeroof.co.in/

Bridge And Roof Company (India) Limited is an Indian state-owned construction company, based in Kolkata, India. The company began in 1920 as a construction organization, encompassing industrial and infrastructure sectors in India as well as abroad. It also undertakes EPC and Turnkey contracts. It is one of the Central Public Sector Enterprises (CPSE) of the Government of India.

== Projects ==
In fiscal 2016, the company reported aggregated revenues of ₹17,101,700,000 (US$180 million).

In 2019, the company completed their 100 years.

In 2024, the company's work at Ernakulam Junction railway station was terminated due to the poor quality of work.

In October 2025, Bridge and Roof Company (India) Limited was awarded a contract by Chennai Metro Rail Limited (CMRL) for the design and construction of 17 entry/exit structures at elevated metro stations in Corridor 3 of CMRL Phase II. The project, valued at ₹250.47 crores, includes civil works, architectural finishes, and transit-oriented property development.

== Controversies ==
In December 2024, the Central Bureau of Investigation (CBI) arrested the Group General Manager of Bridge and Roof Company (India) Ltd in Bhubaneswar for allegedly accepting a bribe of ₹10 lakh from a private contractor in exchange for awarding work orders and expediting bill payments. The bribe was reportedly delivered during a trap laid by the CBI, which also arrested the contractor and a third person accused of facilitating the exchange. Following the arrests, the CBI conducted raids at eight locations in Bhubaneswar and Kolkata, seizing cash, digital devices, and documents. The case triggered political controversy in Odisha, with Biju Janata Dal (BJD) leaders demanding that the state’s ST & SC Development Minister, Nityanand Gond, also be brought under investigation. They questioned how contracts worth ₹37 crore were awarded to the PSU without cabinet-level approval, as required for high-value projects. A CBI team later visited the ST & SC Development department office in connection with the case.
