= Central Warehousing Corporation =

Indian logistic company

Central Warehousing Corporation (CWC)
- Type: Government of India
- Industry: Warehousing and Logistics
- Founded: 1957
- Founder: Govt. of India
- Headquarters: Warehousing Bhawan, 4/1 Siri Institutional Area, August Kranti Marg, Hauz Kaus, New Delhi-110016, India
- Number of locations: 734 warehouses (2025), 18 Custom Bonded Warehouses (2025), 20 CFSs/ICDs (2025), 03 PFT (2025), 25 RWC (2025)
- Area served: India
- Key people: Sh. Ashutosh Agnihotri, IAS, Chairman; Sh. Santosh Sinha, Managing Director; Smt. Sangeeta Ramrakhyani, Director (Personnel); Sh. Niraj Priyadershi, Director (Finance); Sh. Samuel Praveen Kumar, Director (Marketing & Corporate Planning)
- Services: Warehousing Operations Container Rail Transportation
- Number of employees: 1900 (appx.) (as of 2025)
- Website: https://cewacor.nic.in

Central Warehousing Corporation is a statutory body which was established under The Warehousing Corporations Act, 1962. It is a public warehouse operator established by the Government of India under Ministry of Consumer Affairs, Food & Public Distribution in 1957. It operates 986 warehouses across India with a storage capacity of 10 million tonnes. Services include foodgrain warehouses, industrial warehousing, custom bonded warehouses, container freight stations, inland clearance depots, and air-cargo complexes. On 18th April 2024, Government of India conferred with Navaratna status.

== Function ==
The Warehousing Corporation Act, 1962: Subject to the provisions of this Act, the Central Warehousing Corporation may:

- Subscribe to the share capital of a State Warehousing Corporation;
- Act as agent of the Government for the purchase, sale, storage, and distribution of agricultural produce, seeds, manures, fertilizers, agricultural implements, and notified commodities; and
- Carry out such other functions as may be prescribed.

The Warehousing Corporation (Amendment) Bill, 2011 has been proposed in the Lok Sabha by the Ministry of Consumer Affairs, Food and Public Distribution seeking to make Nava-Ratna company Central Warehousing Corporation (CWC) an independent body without the government being a guarantor.

== Operation ==
CWC operations include scientific storage and handling services for more than 400 commodities, including Agricultural produce, Industrial raw materials, finished goods, and a variety of hygroscopic and perishable items.

- Scientific Storage Facilities for commodities, including hygroscopic and perishable items, through a network of 986 warehouses in India with its 1900 personnel.
- Import and Export Warehousing facilities at its 36 Container Freight Stations in ports and inland stations.
- Bonded Warehousing facilities.
- Disinfection services.
- Handling, Transportation & Storage of ISO Containers.

CWC enables the movement of imported and exportable goods to and from the port towns and has developed an infrastructure of Container Freight Stations & Inland Clearance Depots throughout the country. It operates 20 CFSs/ ICDs where composite services for containerised movement of import/export cargo are provided.

The Warehousing Corporation is empowered to acquire and build Warehouses for storage of Agricultural produce, seeds, fertilizers and other notified commodities and also to act as an agent of the Government, for purchases, sales storage, distribution etc., of Agricultural Commodities in time of need. Though it has been criticised for lack of manpower and technologically equipped warehousing facility.
