= High Speed Rail Corporation of India Limited =

Indian Public Sector Undertaking SPV

- Company type: Public Sector Undertaking; SPV
- Industry: Public transport
- Founded: 2012
- Headquarters: New Delhi, India
- Services: High Speed Rail
- Owner: Government of India
- Parent: Rail Vikas Nigam Limited
- Website: hsrc.in

The High Speed Rail Corporation of India Limited (HSRCIL) is a Special Purpose Vehicle (SPV) which has been incorporated in 2012 as a subsidiary of Rail Vikas Nigam Limited (RVNL), a public sector enterprise of the Government of India. The HSRCIL has been formed under the Ministry of Railways, Government of India, for the development and implementation of the high speed rail projects in India.

== Projects ==
=== Mumbai–Ahmedabad high-speed rail corridor ===
The corridor is being implemented by the National High Speed Rail Corporation Limited and the construction is expected to begin by April 2020 and the project is expected to be completed by December 2023. The corridor will use Japan Railways Shinkansen E5 Series electric multiple unit for its rolling stock.

=== Diamond Quadrilateral ===
As of 2020, contracts have been awarded for the feasibility studies for the Diamond Quadrilateral network. There will be 3 phases:

- Delhi-Mumbai
- Mumbai-Chennai
- Delhi-Kolkata

=== Delhi–Chandigarh–Amritsar high-speed rail corridor ===
The pre-feasibility study of this high speed rail corridor is in progress. The interim report was submitted by Systra in 2015.

=== Delhi–Chennai ===
This route will have 2 phases. The first phase, Delhi-Nagpur section is under feasibility study.

== See also ==
- High-speed rail in India
