= Praga Tools =

Subsidiary of HMT Ltd.

Coordinates: 17°25′25.9″N 78°29′42.3″E

Praga Tools Limited
- Company type: Public Sector Undertaking
- Industry: Engineering
- Founded: 1943
- Headquarters: Secunderabad, India
- Products: Machine Tools
- Website: Praga Division, HMT

Praga Tools Limited is an Indian company headquartered at Kavadiguda, Secunderabad, Telangana. It was mainly involved in manufacture of machine tools including CNC machines. It is one of the Defence Public Sector Undertakings.

== History ==
The company was established in May 1943 as Praga Tools Corporation Limited. In 1960-61, the Praga Tools Corporation had a rise in machine tools' output from Rs. 8 lacs to Rs. 48.32 lakhs.

It was renamed as Praga Tools Limited in 1963 and was transferred to the Ministry of Defence in 1963. HMT Limited took over Praga Tools Limited as one of its subsidiaries in 1986.

During 1995-1996, the company got ISO 9001 accreditation. During 2005-2006, the company had a turnover of 11.48 crores as compared to 12.76 crores during 2004-2005. In 2013-2014, 182 crore rehabilitation package was approved by Board for Reconstruction of Public Sector Enterprises. Praga Tools, after being declared a sick unit, sold the land at Kavadiguda from where it used to operate. Heavy machinery from this location was shifted to its other unit at Qutubullapur.
