= Andhra Pradesh Scooters Limited =

- Company type: defunct
- Industry: Automotive
- Founded: 1974, Patancheru
- Defunct: 1986
- Products: Allwyn Puspak, Vespa PL 170
- Number of employees: n/a

Andhra Pradesh Scooters Limited (APSL) was a scooter manufacturer founded in 1974 and operated until 1986 in the Indian state of Andhra Pradesh. It was owned by the Government of Andhra Pradesh.

== Alwyn Puspak ==
APSL started production of the Allywn Puspak scooter, with technical know-how from Scooters India, another public sector undertaking from the state of Uttar Pradesh which manufactured Vijay Super scooters, originally a Lambretta GP under license from Innocenti of Italy. This Puspak model was very similar to the Vijay Super except for some changes in the front mud guard and other small panels and with few changes in the mechanicals. Sales were sluggish and production facilities were underutilized.

== Vespa PL170 ==
In the early 1980s APSL entered into a collaboration agreement with Piaggio, Italy, to manufacture a smaller range of Vespa scooters of 100cc, 80cc and mopeds. The European model Vespa 100 was chosen, rebranded as Vespa PL170, launched in 1983, and was in production until 1986.

However both the models failed to sell in high numbers and the company was declared sick and was referred to BIFR which eventually liquidated the assets after finding no takers.
