= HMT Limited =

Indian State-owned electronics company pvt ltd

- Formerly: Hindustan Machine Tools Limited
- Type: Public
- Traded as: BSE: 500191; NSE: HMT
- Industry: Electronics; Engineering
- Founded: 7 February 1953; 73 years ago
- Founder: Government of India
- Headquarters: 59, Bellary Road, Bangalore, Karnataka, India
- Key people: S. Girish Kumar (Chairman & MD)
- Products: Machine tools; Printing machinery; Food processing machinery; Watches; Tractors; Bearings
- Revenue: ▲₹32.10 crore (US$3.3 million) (2018)
- Operating income: ▲₹3.67 crore (US$380,000) (2018)
- Net income: ▲₹−7.164 crore (US$−740,000) (2018)
- Total assets: ▼₹1,323 crore (US$140 million) (2023)
- Total equity: ▼₹100.29 crore (US$10 million) (2018)
- Owner: Government of India (93.68%)
- Number of employees: 1,742 (2018)
- Subsidiaries: HMT Machine Tools Limited (100%); HMT International Limited (100%); Praga Tools Limited (51%); Closed subsidiaries: HMT Watches Limited (100%); HMT Chinar Watches Limited (100%); HMT Bearings Limited (97.25%)
- Website: www.hmtindia.com

HMT Limited, formerly Hindustan Machine Tools Limited, is an Indian state-owned electronics company under the control of the Ministry of Heavy Industries, Government of India. It was founded in 1953 as a machine tool manufacturing company, diversifying into watches, tractors, printing machinery, metal forming presses, die casting and plastic processing machinery, and CNC systems and bearings. HMT is headquartered at Bangalore.

The watch making division, HMT Watches, opened in 1961. During the 1970s and 1980s HMT was the largest supplier of wrist watches in India, with popular styles including Janata and Pilot. The division closed in 2016, largely due to mismanagement leading to heavy losses. In the same year, the Government of India also shut down HMT Chinar Watches Ltd., HMT Bearings, and HMT Tractors. HMT Machine Tools Limited still manufactures industrial machines and tools with a work force of around 2,500 in six manufacturing units situated at Bangalore (Mother unit), Kochi, Hyderabad (2 units), Pinjore and Ajmer. These mostly serve India's defence, government and educational institutions.

HMT's wholly owned subsidiaries include HMT Machine Tools Limited and HMT International Limited. HMT also holds a majority stake in Praga Tools Limited (51%).

== History ==
Hindustan Machine Tools was incorporated in 1953 by the Government of India as a machine tool manufacturing company. Over the years, HMT diversified into watches, tractors, printing machinery, metal forming presses, die casting and plastic processing machinery, and CNC systems and bearings. HMT is headquartered in Bengaluru (Bangalore).

Technology was absorbed in all product groups through collaborations with world-renowned manufacturers and further strengthened by continuous in-house R&D.

Today, HMT consists of six subsidiaries under the ambit of a holding company, which also manages the tractor business directly.

HMT Limited took over Praga Tools Limited as one of its subsidiaries 1988. Praga Tools Limited was established in May 1943 as Praga Tools Corporation Limited to manufacture machine tools with its headquarters at Secunderabad. It was renamed as Praga Tools Limited in 1963. It is mainly involved in the manufacturing of machine tools, including CNC machines.

=== Watch division ===
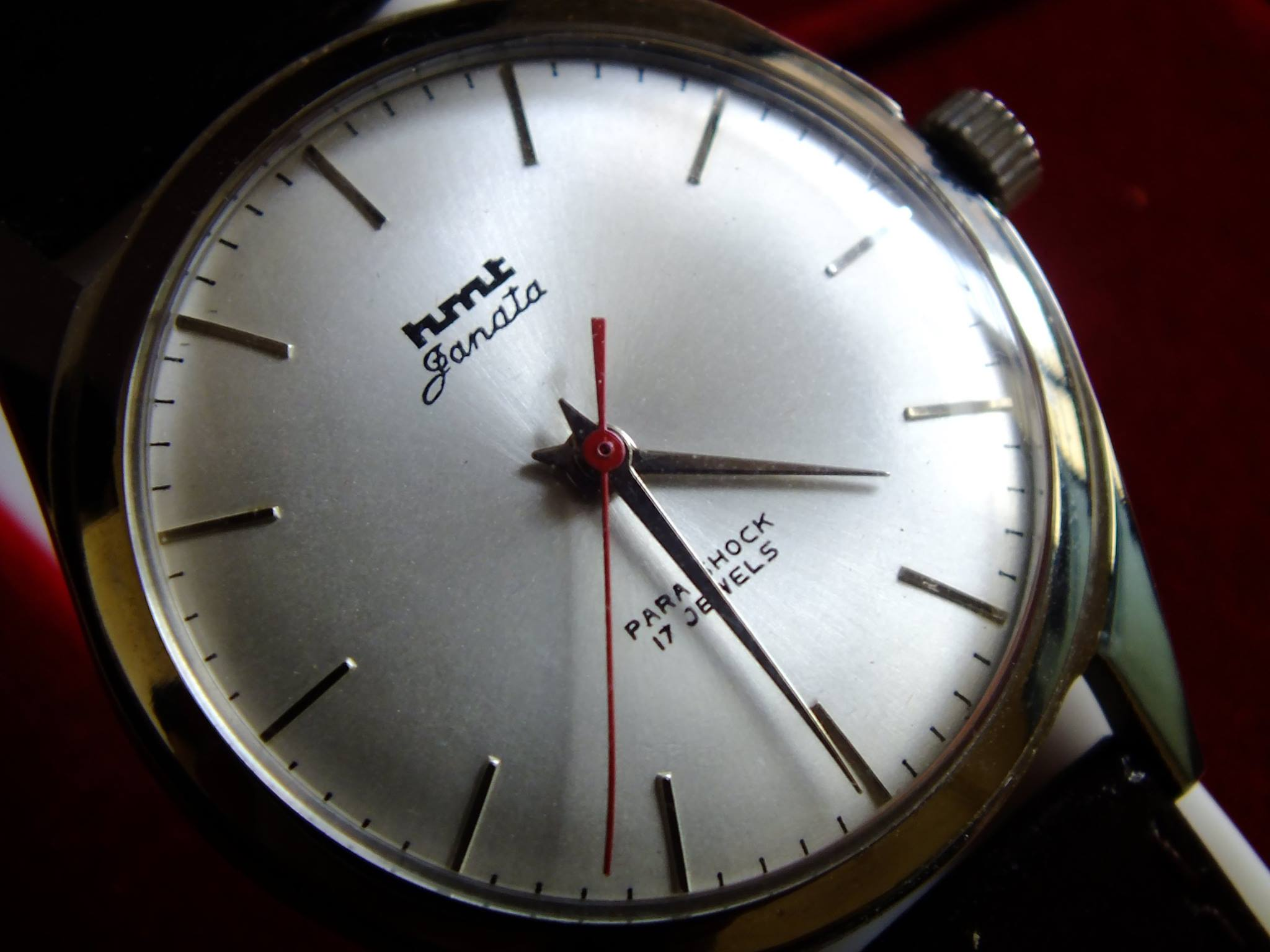
HMT Janata

HMT set up a watch manufacturing factory in Bangalore in collaboration with Citizen Watch, a Japanese company, in 1961. The first batch of mechanical (hand wound) wrist watches manufactured here was released by the then Prime Minister of India, Jawaharlal Nehru. The most popular mechanical watch was HMT Janata. Other mechanical watch styles included HMT Pilot, HMT Jhalak (Semi Skeletal), HMT Sona, HMT Braille, HMT Sujata, HMT Rajat.

In 1972, HMT expanded its watch manufacturing capacity with a set up alongside the Bangalore Factory to manufacture additional watches. In 1975, the watch factory at Bangalore was further expanded to manufacture main spring, hair spring and shock absorber components. HMT set up additional manufacturing facilities to produce watch components sets at Tumkur in 1978 and at Ranibagh in 1985. The factory at Tumkur was partially converted to manufacture quartz analog watches in collaboration with Citizen. To cater to the niche market, a specialised watch case manufacturing facility was set up at Bangalore in 1983.

Since 1985, HMT Watches had been involved in making floral clocks, solar clocks, international clocks and tower clocks, most popular among them being the garden clock at Lal Bagh in Bangalore. In the year 2000, HMT Watch Business group was re-structured as HMT Watches Limited, a wholly owned subsidiary of HMT Limited.

In September 2014, the Government of India shut down HMT operations in a phased manner. By late 2016, the website for HMT watches was taken down.

=== Closure of HMT Watches Division ===
In September 2016, the Government of India closed some divisions of HMT: HMT Watches Ltd, HMT Bearings, HMT Tractors, and HMT Chinar Watches Ltd. The main reasons were that the company was making losses for more than a decade. During 2012–13, the company had losses of ₹242 crore on revenues of only ₹11 crore. In contrast, competitor Titan's watch business reported sales of ₹1,675 crore during the same year. The government also tried restructuring it in 1999 to improve its finances but the company continued to make losses. While in the 1980s several new companies entered the market with newer designs and more modern production techniques, HMT is said to have been hobbled by slow decision making and was unable to compete. Machine tools divisions of HMT in Bangalore, Hyderabad and Kochi (Kalamassery) are still operational and catering industrial and defence sectors of India and abroad. The Government of India is mulling takeover of HMT by Ordnance Factory Board.

== Operating units ==
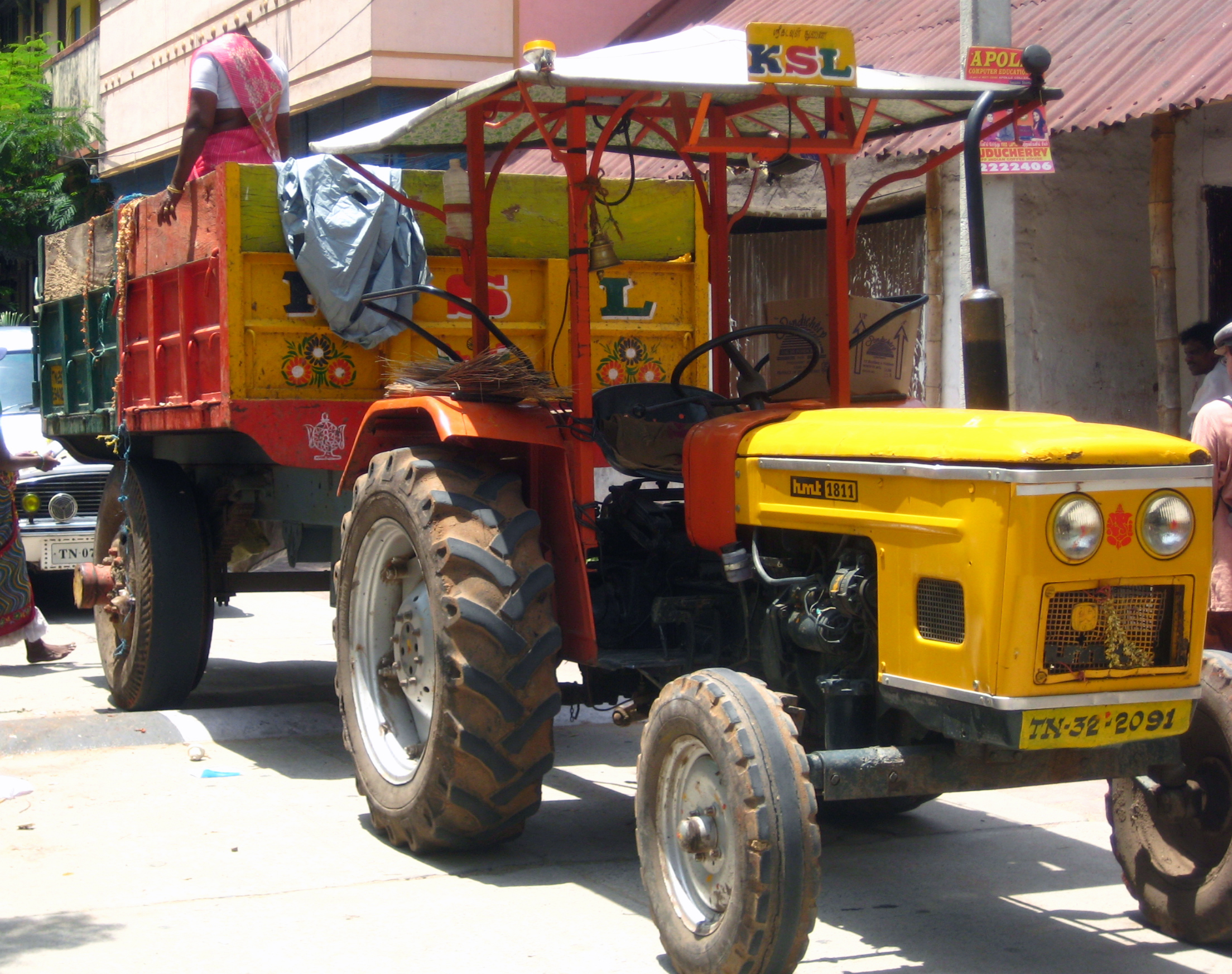
HMT 1811 tractor

HMT Limited had 18 manufacturing units. The constituent subsidiaries are given below while the holding company retains the tractors business group.

HMT's tractor business commenced its operations in 1971 in technical collaboration with Zetor through a licensing deal with Motokov, the export trading arm of Czechoslovakia. HMT started the operation with the manufacture of the 25 HP Zetor 2511 tractor at the manufacturing plant in Pinjore, Haryana state. Over the years, it has developed tractors ranging from 25 HP to 75 HP.

Machine tools divisions of HMT is still continuing its operations and introducing state of the art technologies in Indian industrial market. The Kochi unit has entered manufacturing equipments for Indian Naval defence sector by manufacturing Directing Gear systems.

HMT Milestones
1953	Machine Tools I	Bengaluru	Karnataka
1961	Machine Tools II	Bengaluru	Karnataka
1962	Watch Factory I	Bengaluru	Karnataka
1963	Machine Tools III	Pinjore	Haryana
1965	Machine Tools IV	Kalamassery	Kerala
1967	Machine Tools V	Hyderabad	Andhra Pradesh
1971	Tractor Division	Pinjore	Haryana
1971	Die Casting Division	Bengaluru	Karnataka
1972	Printing Machinery Division	Kalamassery	Kerala
1972	Watch Factory II	Bengaluru	Karnataka
1973	Precision Machinery Division	Bengaluru	Karnataka
1975	Machine Tools VI	Ajmer	Rajasthan
1975	HMT (International) Ltd.	Bengaluru	Karnataka
1975	Watch Factory III	Srinagar	Jammu & Kashmir
1978	Watch Factory IV	Tumkur	Karnataka
1981	HMT Bearings Limited	Hyderabad	Telangana
1981	Quartz Analog Watches	Bengaluru	Karnataka
1982	Watch Factory V	Ranibagh	Uttar Pradesh
1982	Specialised Watch Case Division	Bengaluru	Karnataka
1983	Stepper Motor Division	Tumkur	Karnataka
1985	Ball Screw Division	Bengaluru	Karnataka
1986	CNC Systems Division	Bengaluru	Karnataka
1991	Central Re-conditioning Division	Bengaluru	Karnataka
