= West Bengal State Electricity Transmission Company =

West Bengal State Electricity Transmission Company Limited
- Type: Government enterprise
- Industry: Power transmission
- Predecessor: West Bengal State Electricity Board
- Founded: 1 April 2007
- Headquarters: Vidyut Bhavan, Salt Lake, Kolkata, West Bengal, India
- Area served: West Bengal, India
- Key people: Shri S Suresh Kumar, IAS (Chairman); Shri Santanu Basu, IAS (Managing Director)
- Products: Electricity Power Transmission
- Owner: Government of West Bengal (100%)
- Website: wbsetcl.in

Post the Electricity Act 2003, The GoWB divided the erstwhile West Bengal State Electricity Board (WBSEB) into two functionally independent state-owned companies, West Bengal State Electricity Transmission Company Limited (WBSETCL) and West Bengal State Electricity Distribution Company Limited (WBSEDCL), with effect from 1 April 2007. WBSETCL is responsible for transmitting electricity from generating sources to load centres through a transmission network operating at 400kV, 220kV, 132kV and 66kV spread across West Bengal. WBSETCL is currently playing three distinct functional roles envisaged under the Electricity Act 2003

  • The State Transmission Utility (STU) provider
  • Transmission Licensee (TL)
  • The State Load Dispatch Center (SLDC).

== Network Growth ==
Company's transformation capacity stood at about 16,350 MVA as of March 2010. Capacity at the 220 kV and 132 kV levels constituted a roughly similar share of 40 percent of the total. WBSETCL recorded the highest compound annual growth rate (CAGR) of 13.5% in transformer capacity during 2006-07 to 2009-10 among all state utilities.

Company's transformation capacity is increased to around 43244 MVA as of 2024-2025.

At the end of 2009-10, its transmission line length stood at over 11,450 ckt. km, growing at a CAGR of 6.5% from 2005-06. About 60% of its line network is at the 132 kV level. Across all voltage levels, its 400 kV network(constituting 14% of its network) has grown the fastest in the past five years, with a CAGR of about 20 percent.

The Total Transmission Line Length stands as 16,966 CKM as of 2024-2025.

As of March 2025 the Total No. of Substation is 164 with 07 Nos. 400 kV Substations, 36 Nos. 220 kV Substations, 115 Nos. 132 kV Substations, and 06 Nos. 66 kV Substations.

== Future Plans ==
WBSETCL planned to add over 2,000MVA to its transformer capacity and 900 ckt. km to its transmission line network in the current fiscal year (2010–11). A capex of over Rs 8 billion has been outlined in 2010-11 on various capacity augmentation projects. About 10 new substations would be commissioned by WBSETCL in the current fiscal(2010–11), which would add 2,180 MVA to its existing transformer capacity. These include a 400 kV substation at Kharagpur, two 220 kV substations at Singur and Dalkhola, and five 132 kV substations at Chalsa, Kurseong, Khatra, Mohispota and Salt lake (this will be GIS substation).

Besides the commissioning of new sub-stations, capacity augmentation would be undertaken at 12 existing substations, of which five are at the 220 kV level. Over 912ckt. km of transmission line would also be added in the current fiscal through 19 ongoing transmission line projects. The estimated cost of these transmission line is Rs. 4.63 billion.

In order to reduce transmission losses further, the installation of 33 kV capacitors at EHV substations and installation of EHV substations near the load centers are some of the important strategies being deployed by WBSETCL.

== Growth Statistics ==
	2008-09	2009-10	2024-2025
Line length (ckt. km)	11,089.50	11,456.90	16,966
Substations (no.)	93	102	164
Transformation capacity (MVA)	13,951.20	16,347.70	43244
Transmission Losses (%)	3.90	2.74	2.2
