= Cold-weather biking =

Use of a bicycle during cold months

External videos
- "Why Canadians Can't Bike in the Winter (but Finnish people can)" on YouTube, Not Just Bikes, 26 January 2021

Cyclist riding a shared-city bike on a frozen urban surface in winter, illustrating adaptation of biking to icy conditions.

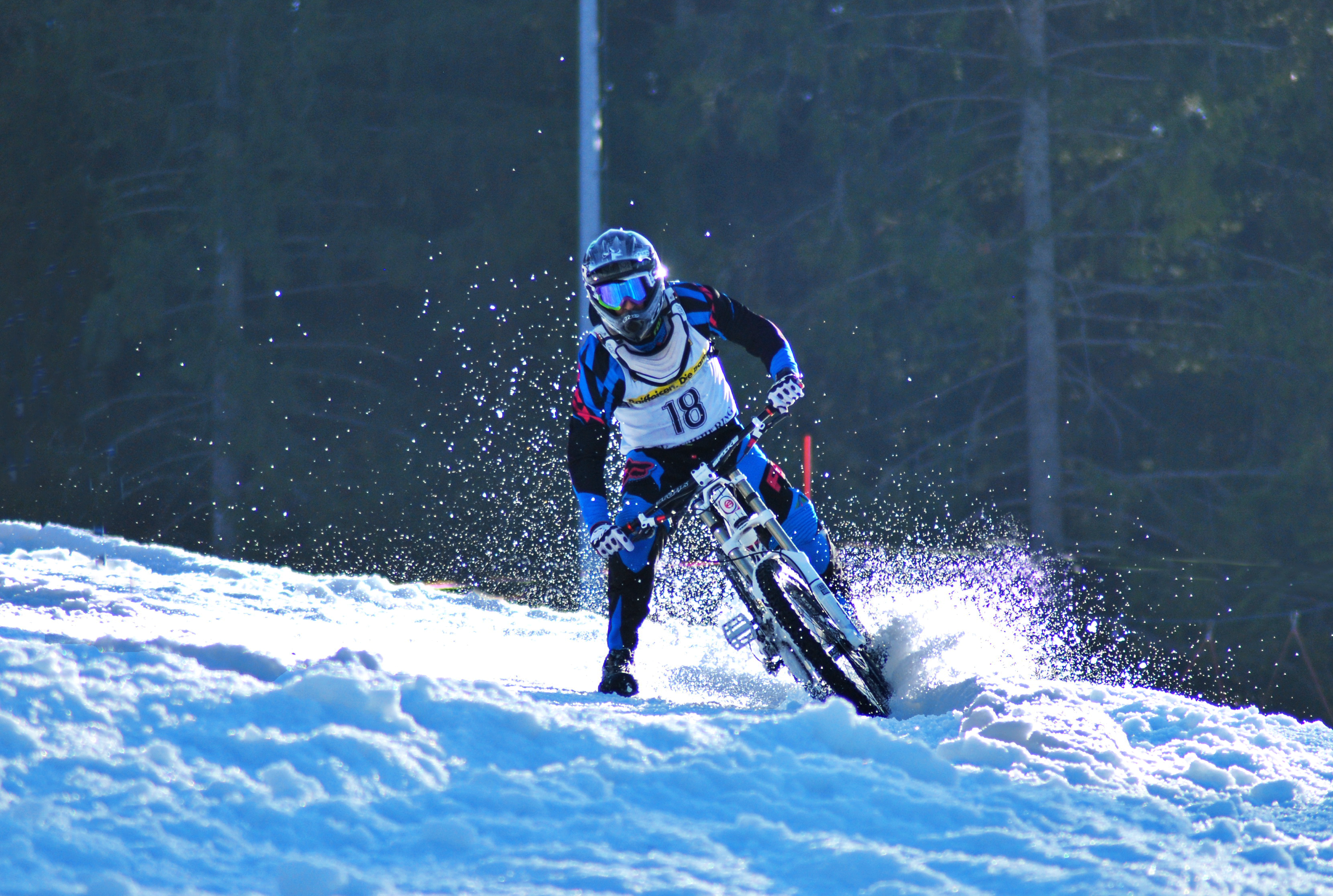
A winter cyclist wearing a full face helmet and goggles.

Cold-weather biking, cold-weather cycling, or winter biking is the use of a bicycle during months when roads and paths are covered with ice, slush and snow. Cold weather cyclists face a number of challenges in near or below freezing temperatures. Urban commuters on city streets may have to deal with "[s]now, slush, salt, and sand", which can cause rust and damage to metal bike components. Slush and ice can jam derailleurs. Some cyclists may bike differently in winter, by "slow[ing] down on turns and brak[ing] gradually" in icy conditions. Gaining traction on snow and ice-covered roads can be difficult. Winter cyclists may use bikes with front and rear fenders, metal studded winter tires and flashing LED lights. Winter cyclists may wear layers of warm clothes and ear, face, and hand coverings may be worn. Specialized winter bikes called fatbikes, which have wide, oversized tires that are typically inflated with low pressure, are used in snow trail riding and winter bike competitions.

== Terminology ==
Cold-weather biking is also called "winter cycling", "winter biking", "snow biking", "fatbiking" (the name is a reference to the oversized, wide tires) or "ice biking." "Ice biking" often refers to biking that takes place on ice-covered lakes and rivers.

== Choice of bike ==
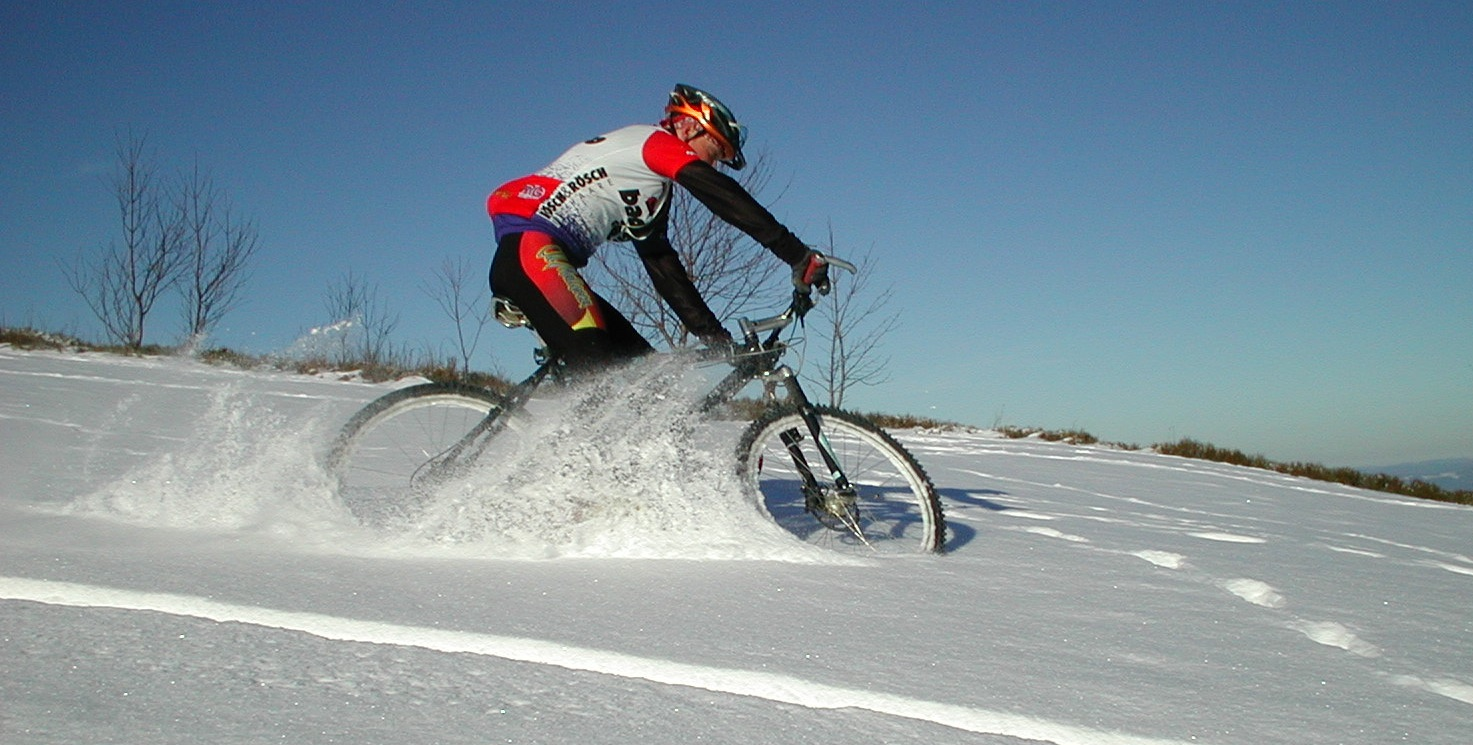
A mountain cyclist riding through a snowy field.

Winter cyclists may use a cheaper bike for winter biking, because "[s]now, slush, salt, and sand" causes rust and damage to metal bike components. The Ottawa Bicycle Lanes Project (OBLP) states that bikes used in winter will be "bombarded by the road salt", which can cause rusting; as such, some cyclists ride a different bike than the one they use in warmer months, such as a used bicycle or an inexpensive bike. Another Ottawa biking website concurs with the statement that winter cyclists do not "ride [their] best or expensive bicycle in winter", but adds that riders do not ride a poor-quality "piece of junk [bike]", as this type of cycle will be "slow, heavy, uncomfortable and continually breaking down"; instead, a "used ‘mid’ level bike" is recommended. An Ottawa biking website states that some winter cyclists use a "mountain style bike" ... [because] ... the frame geometry, wheels and components are design for less than ideal riding conditions such as mud and dirt", which means that the bike is better able to handle snowy and slushy conditions.

CBC news states that winter cyclists may choose to not use multi-speed bikes with derailleurs: "[a] single-speed bike ... means fewer moving parts and it's less likely to freeze up" in icy conditions. According to the OBLP, bikes with an internal gear hub, in which all the gears are enclosed in a case (as opposed to being exposed to the elements) will "kee[p] gears clean and ice/salt free". On bikes used for winter biking in urban environments, the road salt may cause the chain to become rusty, which can cause problems with its functioning (e.g., links seizing up or chain links rusting through). To avoid chain problems, some winter bikers use a belt-driven bicycle, which uses a rubber belt similar to those used as timing belts in automobile engines. Steel components in bikes can be rust-damaged, including steel frames and metal brake cables and shifter cables; for this reason, some winter bikers use bikes made of non-steel materials, such as aluminium.

Offroad cyclists may use fatbikes, a specialized bike type with extra wide rims and tires. These bikes are described in the section below.

== Approach to riding ==
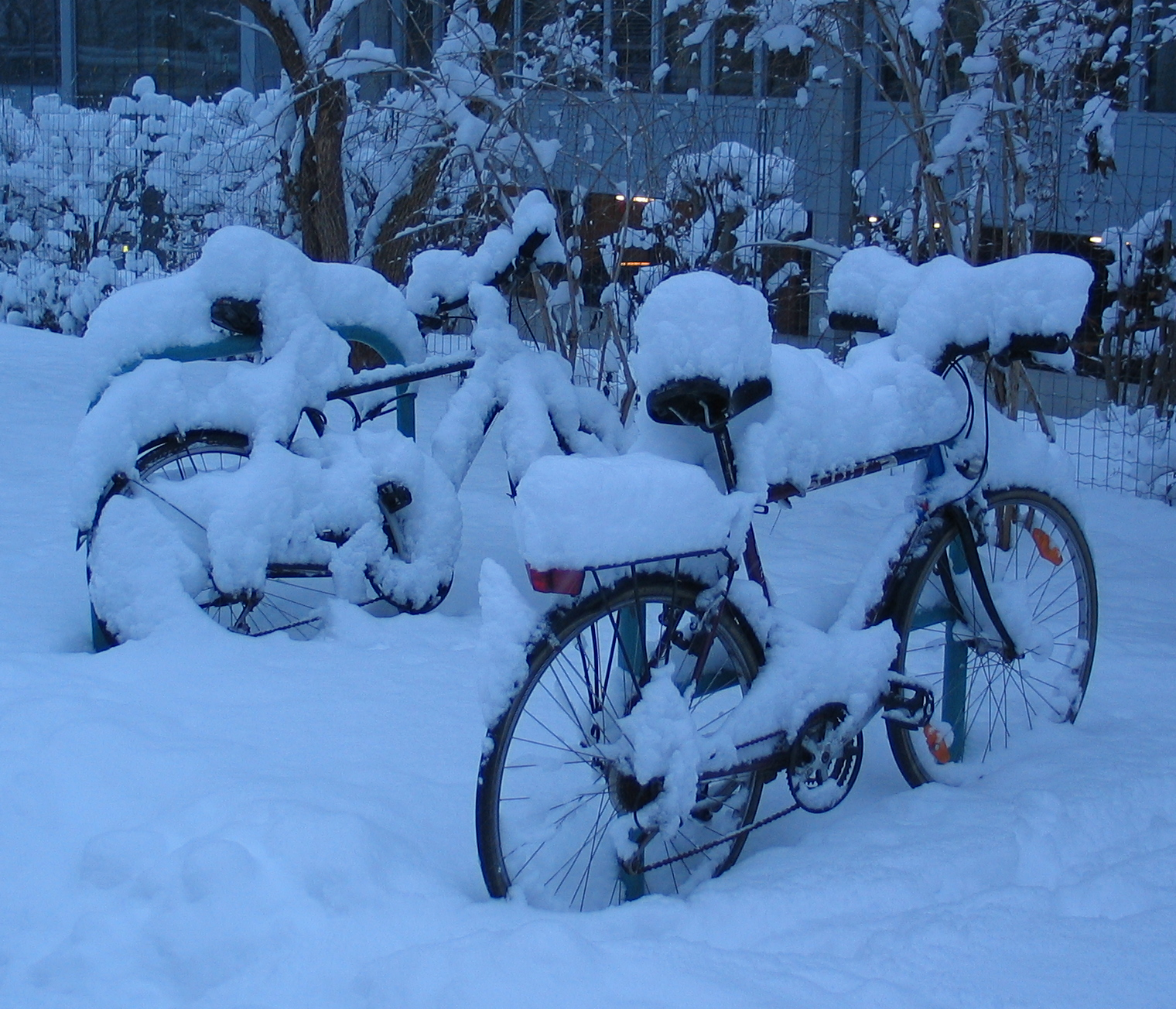
Bicycles parked in a rack in the snow.

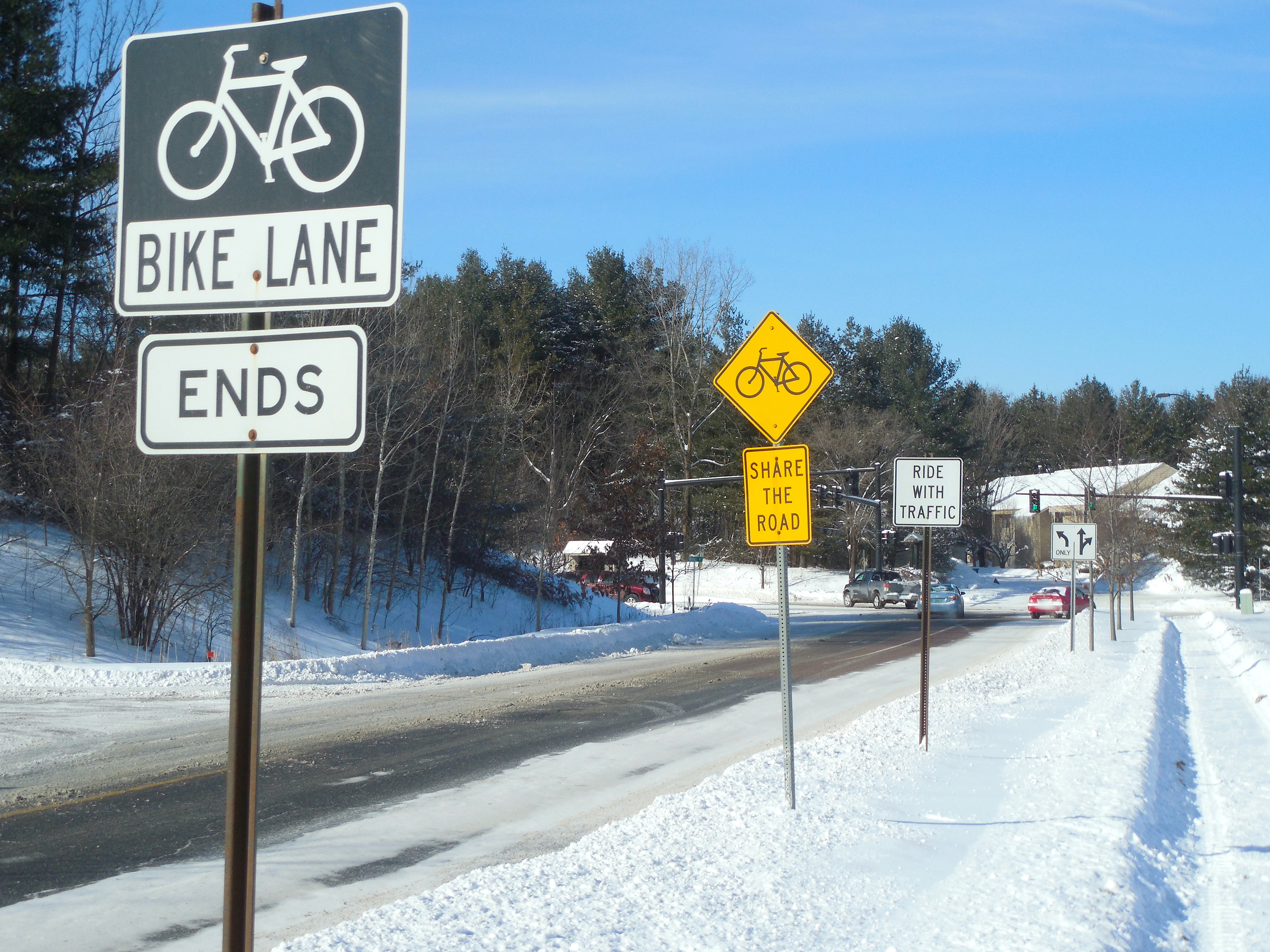
Signed "Conventional bike lane" with snow-covered road surface markings.

Tom Babin, a writer from Calgary who penned Frostbike: The Joy, Pain and Numbness of Winter Cycling states that "[a]bout 30 to 40 per cent of cyclists bike year-round". Babin states that people who have not tried cold-weather cycling tend to be afraid of it, but once cyclists try winter biking, they find "it's a lot easier than they thought it would be." He also states that winter cycling has enabled him "to rediscover the joy of winter" because it can offer riders "beautiful moments" of quiet in the snow and a way to get outdoor exercise.

Because slush and ice can jam derailleurs, some winter cyclists use the "same low gear all winter", even if they have a multi-speed bike. The OBLP states that cyclists biking in winter "slow down on turns and brake gradually" in icy conditions.

The City of Ottawa states that some cyclists may use vehicular cycling techniques for winter biking, including taking control of the lane when appropriate: "Roads tend to be a bit narrower due to snow banks. Ride in the middle lane when necessary, which will prevent motorists from passing you too closely."

According to the OBLP, some winter cyclists avoid major roads and use "low/slow traffic streets and winter maintained pathways." The OBLP states that some winter cyclists choose not to bike on "very cold, icy or ... snow storm" days, and take a bus or other commuting method.

Cyclist riding a shared-city bike on a frozen urban surface in winter, illustrating adaptation of biking to icy conditions.

In some regions where lakes, rivers or frozen urban surfaces are accessible, cyclists experiment with riding on solid ice or highly compacted snow, a variant sometimes referred to as “ice biking”. Unlike standard winter commuting on plowed roads, this form of cycling often requires specially adapted equipment or modifications to improve traction and stability on ice. While purposeful fat-tire bikes and studded tires are more common for snowy terrain, riding on bare ice introduces additional hazards including reduced lateral grip and increased risk of single-bicycle crashes. A recent case-study found that nearly half of all hospital-admitted biking accidents in snowy/ice conditions were attributed to surface slip events.

== Maintenance ==
When winter biking, some cyclists regularly lubricate the chain with a wet lubricant. An Ottawa winter biking website states that lubricant "may have to be reapplied daily in slush conditions", due to the presence of water and road salt on streets. The OBLP states that winter cyclists use a "thickish lube" on their chain and derailleurs. An Ottawa bike website states that there is a downside to using oil lubricants: "[o]il lubes are a quick and dirty way to keep your bicycle running in winter, [because] oil doesn’t freeze and it does displace water – thus preventing freezing. However, oil collects a lot of dirt and debris – wearing your bicycle’s components faster." The city of Toronto states that some winter cyclists oil the freewheel and put "...a drop of oil at the end of each wheel spoke" to reduce rusting. A Torontoist article states that winter cyclists "[w]ipe down [their] bike [after riding], paying special attention to the brakes, which can corrode easily. And then clean and lubricate [the] chain" with a wet, oil-based lubricant. The OBLP states that some winter cyclists wash off their bike, to get grime and salt off the components. Some car washes and indoor parking garages have high-pressure hoses that can be used.

An Ottawa winter biking website states that bringing a bike used outside in winter weather into a heated indoor area "...will cause condensation to form on everything, and it will immediately freeze if brought back outside."

== Accessories ==
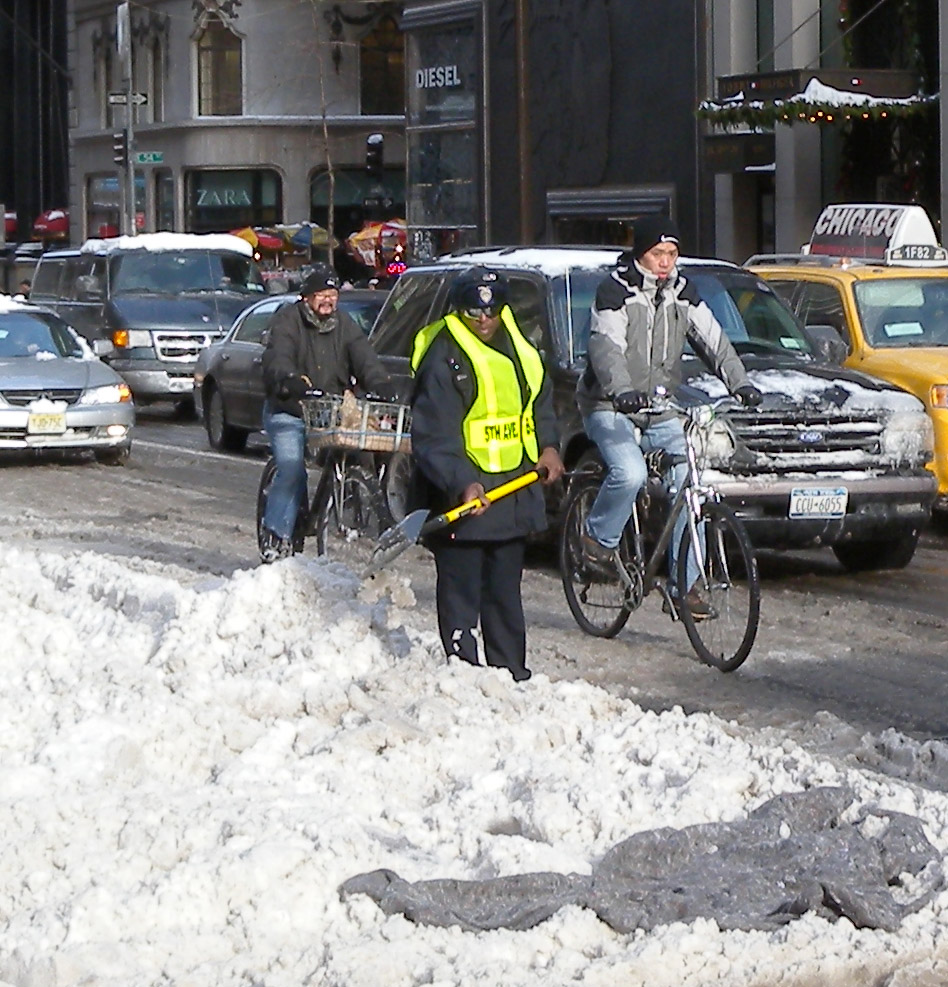
Cold-weather cyclists riding in the rightmost part of the lane in New York City.

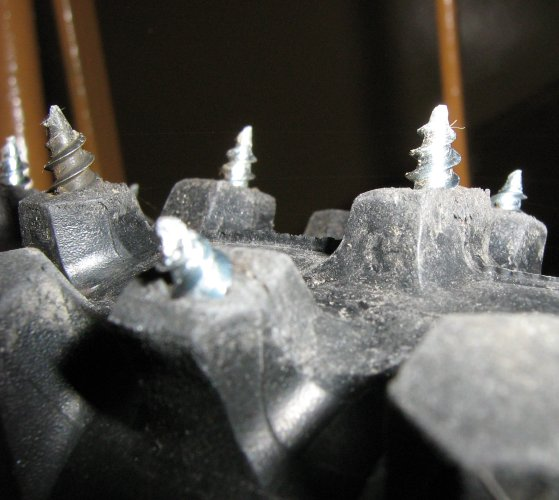
A knobby mountain bike tire with DIY screws protruding from the treads.

Gaining traction on snow and ice-covered roads can be difficult. In mild winter weather, cyclists "use low-pressure knobby tires on both the front and rear wheels". During "severe conditions, winter tires with hardened steel spikes" can be used to increase traction and provide "better control".

The OBLP states that some cyclists use front and rear fenders for winter biking. For winter biking, fenders that are fitted with some space between the wheel and the fender are used by some cyclists. According to the Mountain Equipment Co-op, close-fitted fenders can clog up with snow. According to the OBLP, while fenders with space "don’t accumulate snow buildup, ... [some] prefer tight fitting fenders."

The OBLP states that some winter cyclists use Schwalbe studded winter Marathon tires.

To avoid frozen brake and derailleur cables, an Ottawa website states that some riders use "‘slick’ or Teflon type cables" or "regular cables" lubed with a "dry [wax] lube like White Ligh[tn]ing".

== Visibility ==
During the winter, it is harder for drivers to see cyclists, due to the shorter daylight hours and the potential for ice and snow to be obscuring part of the car windows, so some cyclists use flashing LED lights on the front and rear of the bike and "[b]right coloured garments" to increase their visibility on the road. One winter cyclist quoted by CBC news states that he "double[s] the number of lights" on his bike during the darker winter periods. According to Karen Ruth, "garish" colored outerwear, such as neon pink and yellow jackets help to make winter cyclists visible from a distance; she also states that jackets with reflective stripes are used. The City of Toronto states that reflective tape, reflective leg bands and reflective safety vests are used by winter cyclists to increase motorists' ability to see them in the dark.

== Clothing and protective gear ==
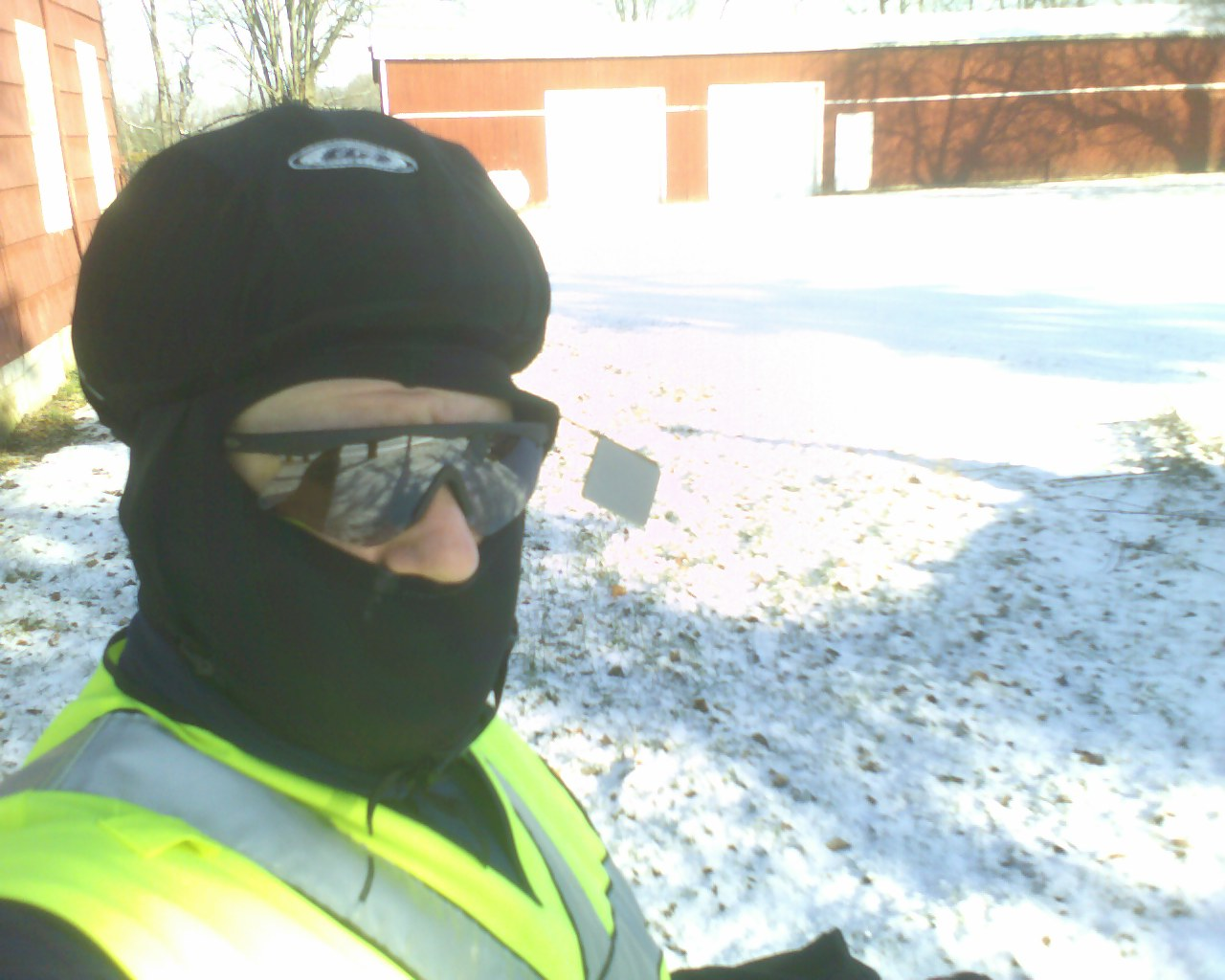
A winter cyclist dressed for a cold ride in a high-visibility reflective vest, balaclava and helmet cover.

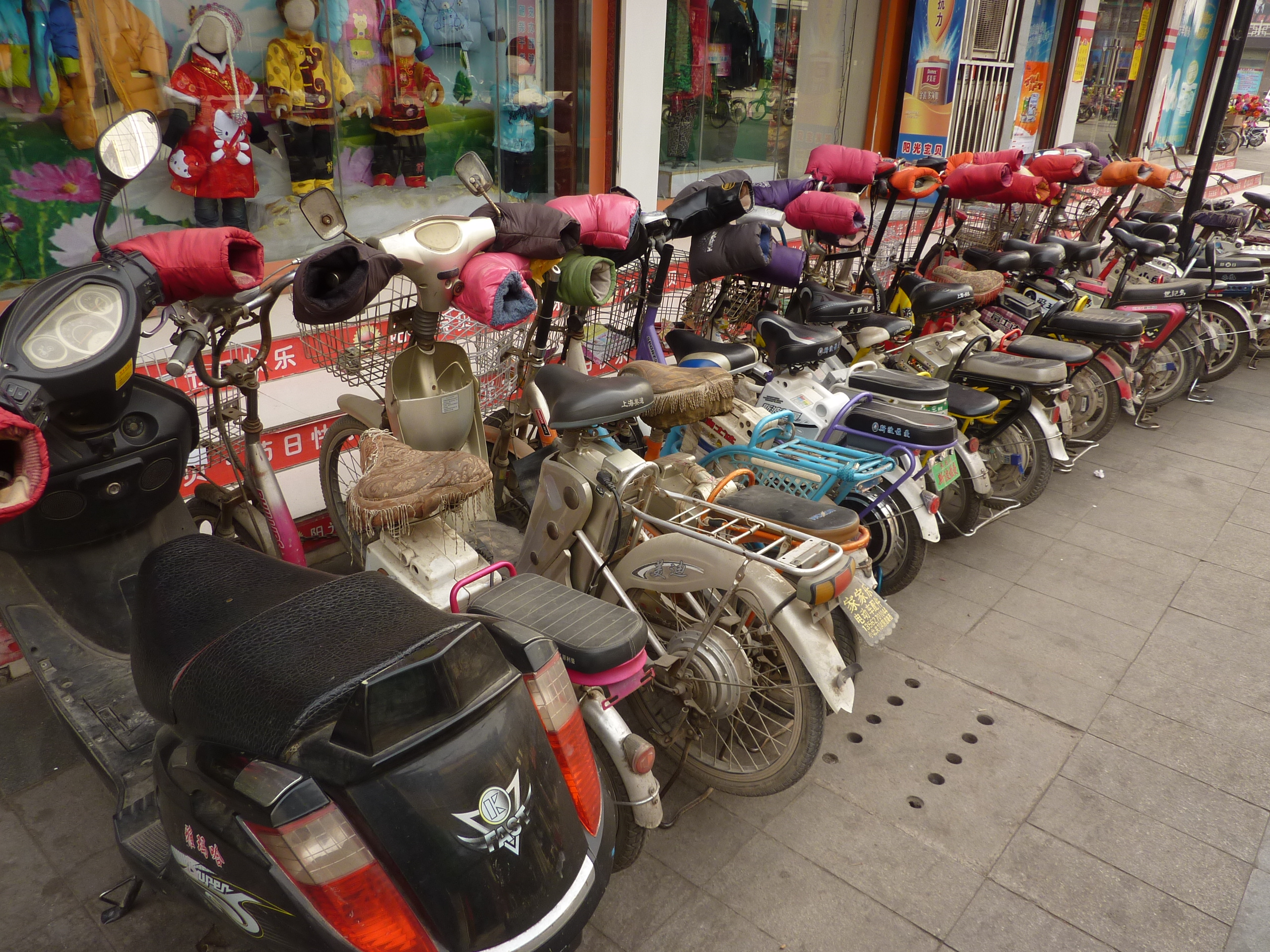
The Chinese version of hand-protecting "pogies", used on electric bicycles in cold weather.

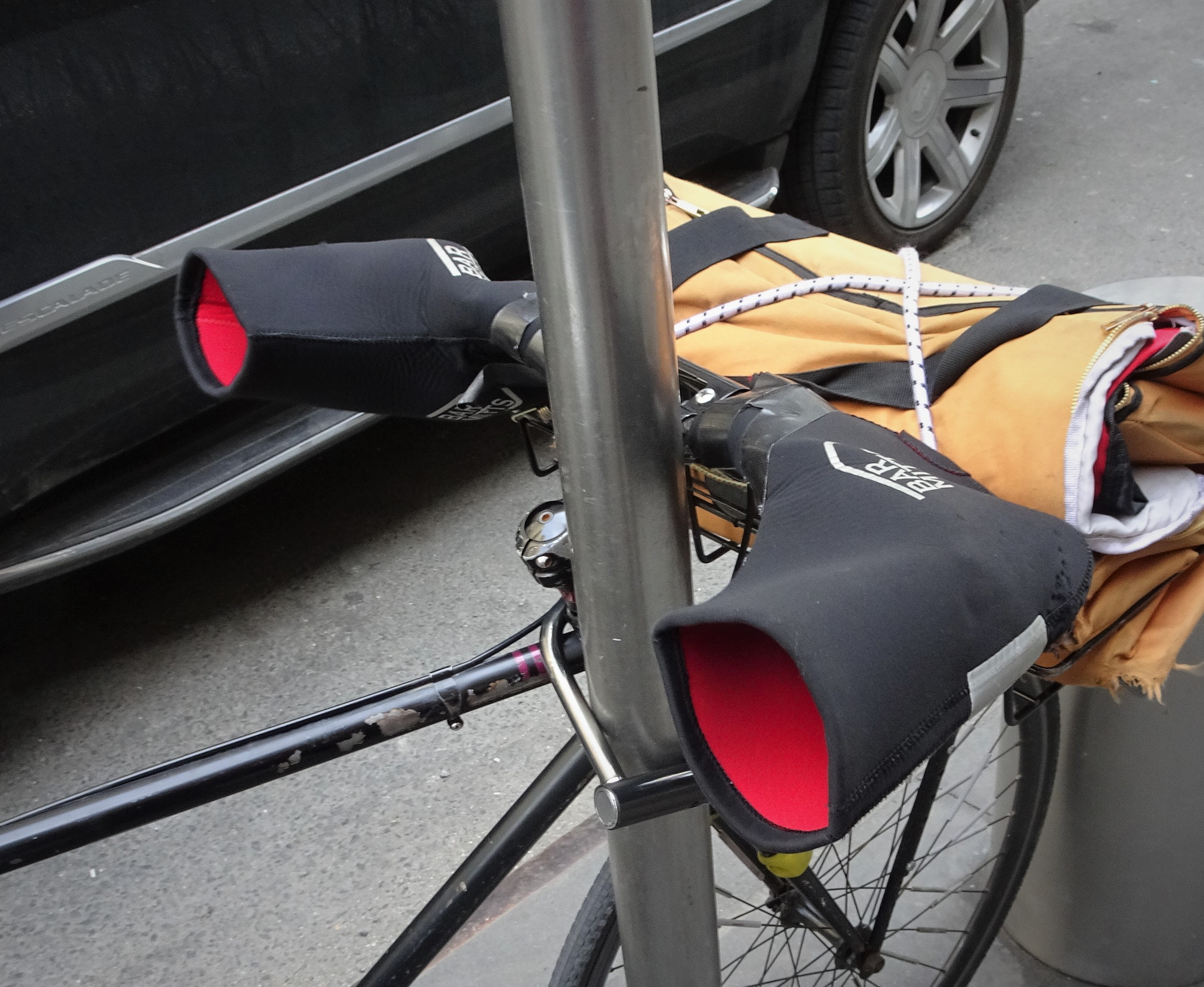
Bar mitts in New York

Wearing several winter clothing layers make it easier to regulate body temperature when cycling in the winter. Hats, gloves, socks, arm warmers, leg warmers, scarves, neck gaiters and lightweight packable jackets, can be adjusted, added, or removed to help regulate your body temperature and personal comfort. In below freezing temperatures extra clothing items can be added to help keep you warm these include thermal pants, winter shoe covers, and longer coats.

A CTV article states that winter cyclists may dress in layers, and they may cover the "ears, face, and hands" using "neck warmers, balaclavas, and even ski goggles." According to Karen Ruth, some winter cyclists choose outer shells that strike a balance between being waterproof and being breathable (to allow perspiration to escape); outer shells that contain armpit zippers and zip-off sleeves are sometimes used. Lobster claw mitts are used by some winter cyclists. They have two sections for the fingers, which helps to keep the fingers warm, while at the same time facilitating the use of brake levers. Water-resistant clothing is used on some days; an Ottawa winter biking website states that "...roads will be covered with melting snow/slush at the edges, making any cycling a ‘wet’ experience." To prevent negative effects of windchill on the face, the same website states that cyclists protect the face with balaclavas and eye coverings (e.g., ski goggles). An Ottawa bike website states that to keep the head warm while wearing a standard bike helmet, that contains numerous vents, some cyclists wear helmet covers or use DIY solutions like covering up the vents with duct tape.

While some winter cyclists prefer using traditional gloves or mittens (or hybrids such as the lobster claw mitts) that are worn directly on the hands, pogies are another option to protect the hands from cold and wet weather. These hand coverings are directly mounted to the handlebars and encompass the grips, shifters and brake levers, allowing the cyclist to insert their hands into the pogies and have full control over their bike cockpit without wearing heavier, more cumbersome gloves. Pogies are especially useful for bicycle messengers working in cold weather, as using light gloves or even none at all within the pogies allows for normal hand dexterity for operating radios, cell phones, pens and other small motor skill tasks without needing to continuously remove and put heavy gloves back on again.

== Off-road use ==
There have been a number of Antarctic cycling expeditions in which adventurers have used specialized wide-tired bikes called fatbikes. In December 2013, Maria Leijerstam completed the first successful pedal-powered ride across Antarctica to the South Pole on a customized recumbent trike.

=== Fatbikes ===
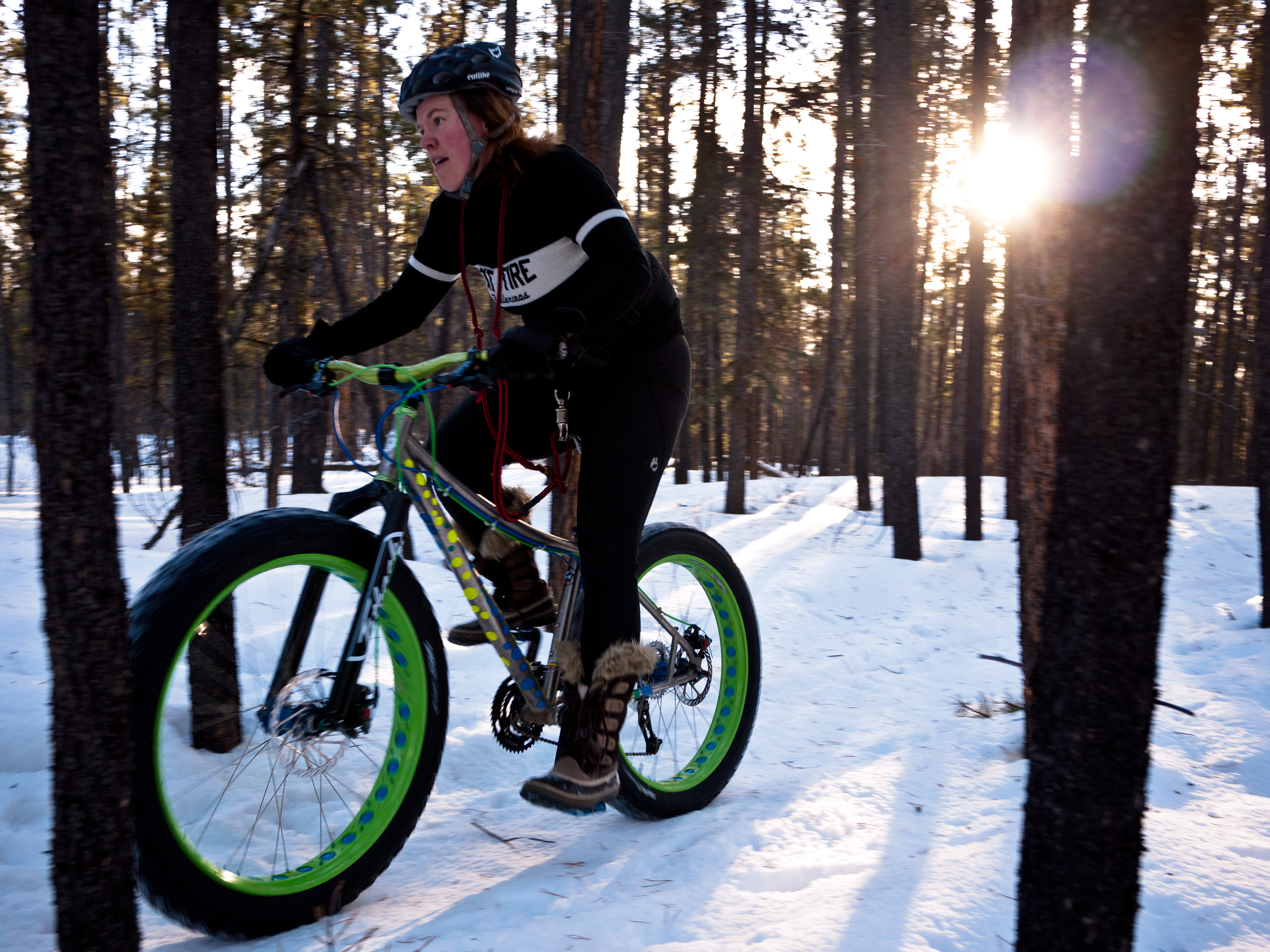
A fatbike with wide, low-pressure tires being ridden over the snow

A fatbike is a bicycle with wide, oversized tires, typically 3.8 in (97 mm) or larger and rims 2.6 in (66 mm) or wider, designed for low inflation to allow riding on soft unstable terrain such as snow. The name is a reference to the fatness of the tires used on the cycles. The wide tires can be used with inflation pressures as low as 5 psi (340 hPa) to allow for a smooth ride. Surly Bikes released the Pugsley frame, in 2005, and began producing Large Marge 65 mm rims and Endomorph 3.8-inch tires in 2006. The Pugsley frame, rim and tire offerings made fatbikes commercially available in local bike shops worldwide. Other early versions of the fatbike were normal mountain bikes equipped with SnowCat rims, created by Simon Rakower of All-Weather Sports in Fairbanks, Alaska in the early 1990s; or with multiple tires seated on two or three standard rims that had been welded or pinned together.

Fatbiking is both a recreational activity and a competitive activity. An example of recreational fatbiking is the announcement in 2015 by Gatineau Park in Canada's national capital region that snow biking and winter mountain biking will be permitted on selected snowshoe trails. The park only permits cyclists with "winter bikes equipped with tires at least 9.4 cm (3.7-in.) wide" to use the trails. As the popularity of fatbikes has expanded, fatbike-specific events (races, race series, tours, and festivals) have emerged. Examples include the Snow Bike Festival, the annual Global Fatbike Summit (since 2012), the Fatbike Birkie race which is part of the Great Lakes Fatbike Series (2014-2015 season: 8 races held across 3 states), the US Open Fatbike Beach Championships (inaugural, 2015), the USA Cycling Fat Bike National Championship (inaugural, 2015), and the 45Nrth Fatbike Triple Crown race series.

== See also ==
- A Winter of Cyclists, a 2013 documentary
- Bicycle fairing, aerodynamic shell for bicycles
- Fatbike, special bicycle for use in snow, sand, etc.
- Ice cycle, special bicycle for use on ice
- List of Antarctic cycling expeditions
- Night cycling, cycling when it is dark
- Outline of bicycles
- Outline of cycling
- Skibob, winter sport
- Winterization, the process of preparing something for the winter
