= Daniel Burton =

American bicycle enthusiast

Daniel P. Burton
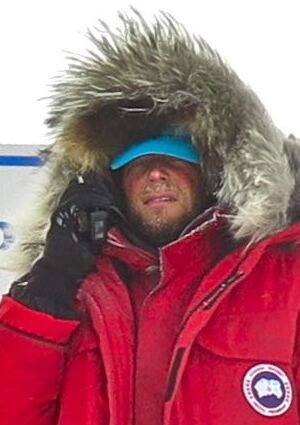
- Burton at completion of first bike ride from coast of Antarctica to the South Pole
- Born: Daniel Paul Burton; December 4, 1963 (age 62); Corvallis, Oregon
- Occupations: Public speaker and entrepreneur
- Known for: First person to bike to the South Pole
- Website: epicbiking.com

Daniel Paul Burton (born December 4, 1963) is an American bicycle enthusiast from Eagle Mountain, Utah, and the first person to complete an expedition from the coast of Antarctica to the South Pole by bicycle (though not the first to cycle to it).

Burton began his expedition, "The South Pole Epic", on December 2, 2013, at Hercules Inlet and arrived at the South Pole on January 21, 2014.

== Background ==
Burton was a computer programmer by trade. Twenty-three years into his career and out of shape in his 40s, Burton went to get his blood checked. His cholesterol levels were poor, his blood pressure was high and he was a bit overweight. He started to mountain bike and in 2008 established a bike shop in Saratoga Springs, Utah, called Epic Biking. He finished the LOTOJA Classic six times and wanted to do more. He decided to set out on his Antarctic ride to inspire people and to encourage donations to the American Diabetes Association. He also wanted to ride in honor of his mother, whose high cholesterol contributed to her death on November 30, 2012.

== South Pole ==
Burton began riding fatbikes, which are fortified bikes with wide tires that are intended for sand, ice and snow. He became interested in Eric Larsen's attempt to travel to the bottom of the world in 2012. Larsen made it a quarter of the way before turning around. Training for a year, Burton set off on his expedition December 2, 2013. He started at Hercules Inlet and rode 775 miles (1,247 km) on a Borealis Yampa fatbike until he reached the Geographic South Pole.

== See also ==
- List of Antarctic cycling expeditions
