= List of Antarctic cycling expeditions =

Antarctic cycling expeditions were made possible with the development of fatbikes: fat tired bicycles designed for riding in snow and sand.

== Expeditions ==
Expeditions in descending order of distance cycled.

Name	Mode of Travel	Distance by Bike	Support	Notes
Juan Menéndez Granados	Ski and Bicycle	775 miles (1,247 km)	Solo	Hercules Inlet to South Pole, 2014
Daniel P. Burton	Bicycle	775 miles (1,247 km)	Solo, food drops	Hercules Inlet to South Pole, 2013–14
Omar Di Felice	Bicycle	445 miles (716 km)	Solo	Starting at Hercules Inlet, 2023
Maria Leijerstam	Tricycle	396 miles (637 km)	Solo (partial logistical support)	Followed the South Pole Traverse, 2013
Keith Tuffley	Bicycle and Skis	385 miles (620 km)	Unsupported, with two other team members on skis	Ross Ice Shelf to South Pole via a new route on Reedy Glacier, 2016-17
Eric Larsen (Polar Explorer)	Bicycle	335 miles (539 km)	Solo, food drops	Starting at Hercules Inlet, 2012
Doug Stoup	Bicycle	200 miles (320 km)	Solo	Heritage range, 2003
Helen Skelton	Kite, Ski, Bicycle	103 miles (166 km)	Motorized support	non coastal starting location, 2012

Doug Stoup was the first person to undertake a cycling expedition in Antarctica. In January 2003 he rode 200 miles (320 km) on a specially designed "ice bike" around the Patriot Hills.

In 2012, Helen Skelton became the first person to reach the South Pole using a bicycle. The bike was custom built for her trip with 8-inch-wide (20 cm) tires. She also used skis and a kite to help her pull a sled containing 82 kilograms (181 lb) of supplies. She covered 329 miles (529 km) by kite ski, 103 mi (166 km) by bike and 69 mi (111 km) by cross-country ski. Some of Skelton's claims have been challenged.

In December 2012, Eric Larsen made the first attempt to undertake an expedition solely by bicycle to the South Pole. After covering 175 miles (282 km), a quarter of the distance to the South Pole, Larsen abandoned his attempt and cycled an additional 160 miles (260 km) back to Patriot Hills.

On 27 December 2013, Maria Leijerstam became the first person to cycle from the coast of Antarctica to the South Pole. Her journey commenced from near McMurdo Station on the Ross Ice Shelf and accessed the Polar Plateau via the Leverett Glacier. Maria also established the human-powered speed record of 10 days, 14 hours, and 56 minutes

Juan Menéndez Granados, calling himself "Juan Sin Miedo", started his bicycle and ski expedition at Hercules Inlet in December 2013 and finished on January 17, 2014. He traveled the full distance without being resupplied, surviving the last 4 days of the expedition drinking chocolate powder and sunflower oil. When it was not possible to progress by cycling, he used skis to make progress. He became the first person to cycle to the South Pole solo, unsupported and unassisted.

Daniel Burton attempted a solo cycling expedition to the South Pole later in 2014, although there were four caches of food staged along the route, as well as an equipment cache. Burton traveled the full distance pedaling or pushing his bike (without skis such as Menéndez used). His effort took 5 days longer than Menéndez'.

In 2026-17, Keith Tuffley became the first person to cycle a new route to the South Pole. He cycled from the coast of Antarctica on the Ross Ice Shelf to the top of the Reedy Glacier and through the Trans-Antarctic Mountains - this was first ever traverse of the Reedy Glacier. For the first 21 days of the expedition (distance of 377km, to an altitude of 2,846m), 81% of the distance was completed on the bike and 19% on skis. For the remaining 13 days (244km) to the South Pole, the majority was on skis. In total, he traveled 621km, 51% of which was completed by bike (315km), 49% on skis. The expedition was unsupported and unassisted (no food drops, no access to a compacted ice road or to vehicle tracks). He completed the expedition together with polar guide Eric Phillips and Robert Smith who were both on skis.

Omar Di Felice attempted a solo cycling expedition to the South Pole first in November 2022 but it was forced to come back home after a week due to family problem. After winning the Trans Am Bike Race in June 2023, he decided to come back trying to reach the South Pole starting from Hercules Inlet in November 2023. He started on November 20th and after 48 days of riding he was forced to stop and cycle back to be picked up in Thiels Corner (85°05' South on the Hercules Inlet - South Pole track). His attempt called "Antarctica Unlimited" is also part of the project "Bike to 1.5°C" to raise awareness on climate change. The distance he covered is the second longest ever cycled in Antarctica
