= Fatbike =

Style of bicycles with oversized tires

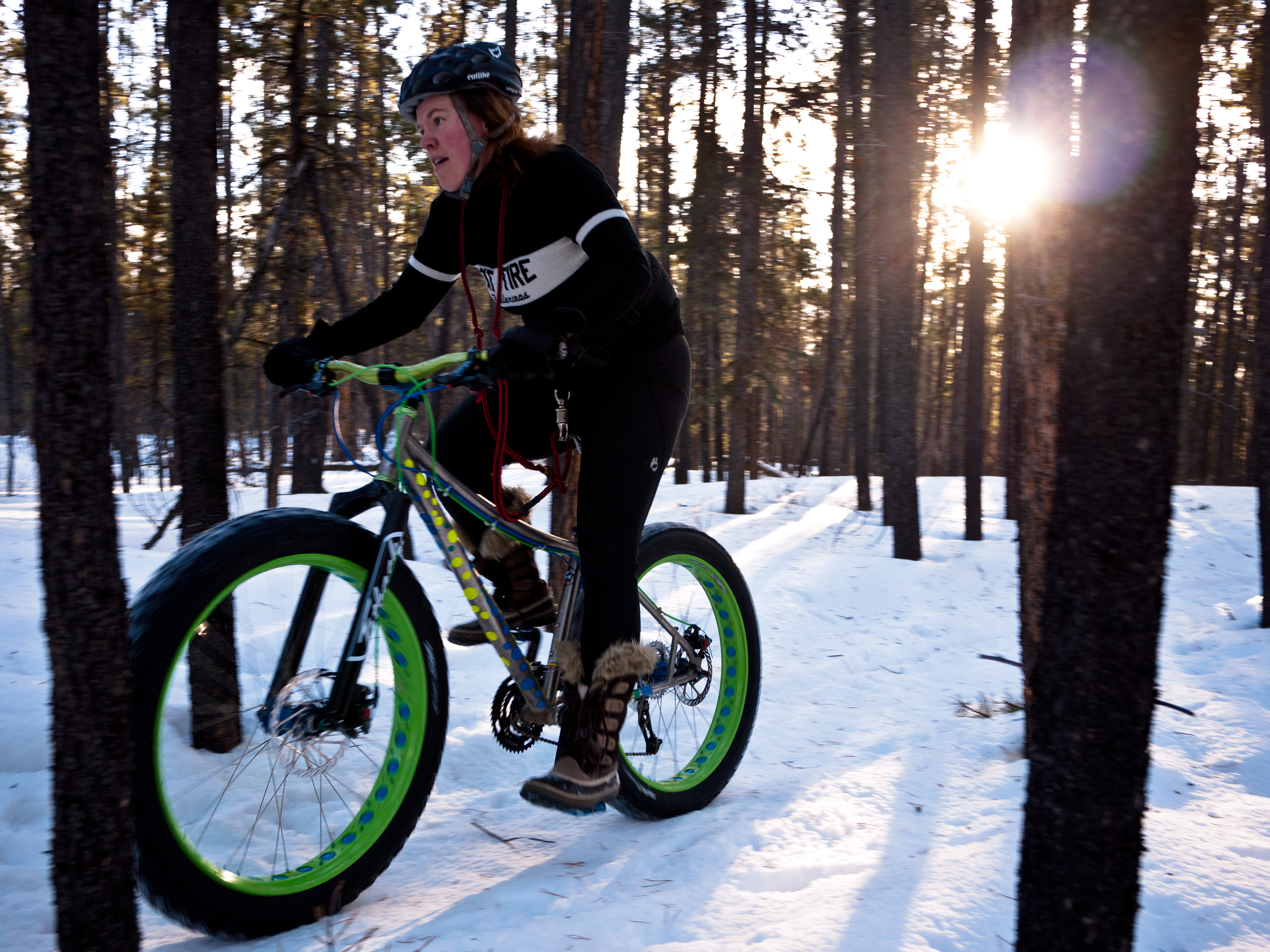
Fatbike being ridden over snow

A fatbike (also called fat bike, fat tire, fat-tire bike, or snow bike) is a bicycle with oversized tyres, typically 3.8 in (97 mm) or larger and rims 2.16 in (55 mm) or wider, designed for low ground pressure to allow riding on soft, unstable terrain, such as snow, sand, bogs and mud. Fatbikes are built around frames with wide forks and stays to accommodate the space required to fit these wide 26" rims and tires. The wide tires can be used with inflation pressures as low as 34 kPa; 0.34 bar (5 psi) to allow for a smooth ride over rough obstacles. A rating of 55–69 kPa; 0.55–0.69 bar (8–10 psi) is suitable for most riders. Fatbikes were developed for use in snow or sand, but are capable of traversing diverse terrain types including snow, sand, desert, bogs, mud, pavement, or traditional mountain biking trails. In the 2020s, fatbikes have seen increased usage in urban areas as well.

== History ==
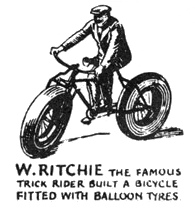
Picture from series "Strange but True!", placed by Currys Ltd in the cycling press, before 1932

Early versions of fat-tired bikes were probably built as long ago as the early 1900s but modern versions were not developed until the 1980s. An early example is the custom three-wheeled in-line longtail-style bike with fat tires, designed by French cyclist Jean Naud in 1980 for desert travel. He rode it from Zinder in Niger to Tamanrasset in Algeria, and later rode a similar bike in 1986 across the Sahara using prototype fat tires from Michelin.

In the late 1980s, Alaskan frame builders began experimenting with custom components and configurations designed to achieve a large contact patch of tire on snow. Steve Baker, with Icycle Bicycles in Anchorage, was welding together two rims and even three rims and built several special frames and forks that could accommodate two or three tires together. In 1989, Dan Bull, Mark Frise, Roger Cowles and Les Matz, rode the 1,000-mile (1,600 km) length of the Iditarod Trail.

Simultaneously, in New Mexico, Ray Molina had commissioned Remolino 3.1 in (79 mm) rims, 3.5 in (89 mm) tires, and frames to fit them. He wanted the bikes for his guided tour business in the soft sands of the Mexican and Southwest arroyos and dunes. Mark Gronewald, owner of Wildfire Designs Bicycles in Palmer, Alaska, met Molina at the 1999 Interbike convention in Las Vegas and rode one of Molina's prototypes at demo days. In late 1999, Gronewald and another Alaskan frame builder, John Evingson, collaborated to design and build several bikes using Molina's rims and tires. Gronewald and Evingson then began producing their own separate lines of fat-tired bikes in 2000. Rims and tires were imported to Alaska where Wildfire and Evingson began making small, handmade production runs and custom-ordered frames built around Remolino 80 mm (3.1 in) rims and 3.5-inch (89 mm) tires. Gronewald coined the trademark "Fat Bike" in 2001 and used it as the model name for his bikes. Gronewald initially worked with Palmer Machinery for welding and later contracted frame building to Mike DeSalvo at DeSalvo Cycles of Ashland, Oregon. Gronewald continued to sell his original fatbikes until 2011. Gronewald's design featured an 18 mm (0.71 in) offset wheel and frame built to allow full range gearing, since he was using standard hubs and bottom brackets available at the time.

Wildfire and Evingson bikes were used in the Iditarod Trail races beginning in 2000. Also that year, Mike Curiak from Colorado set a record on the Iditarod Trail in the IditaSport Extreme race to Nome on a modified Marin bike with Remolino rims and tires. Surly Bikes released the Pugsley frame, in 2005, and began producing Large Marge 65 mm (2.6 in) rims and Endomorph 3.8-inch (97 mm) tires in 2006. The Pugsley frame, rim and tire offerings made fatbikes commercially available in local bike shops worldwide. The Pugsley bikes also featured the offset wheel and frame build.

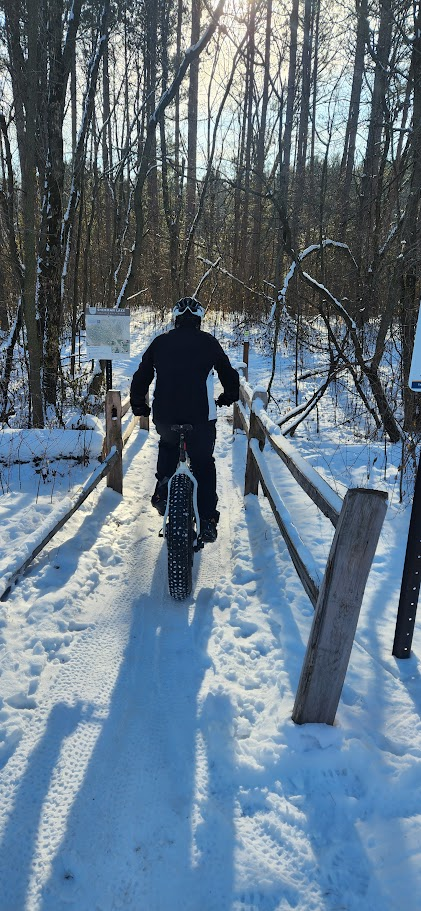
Man riding a fat tire bike in the woods near White Bear Lake, Minnesota

Other early versions of the fatbike were normal mountain bikes equipped with SnowCat rims, created by Simon Rakower of All-Weather Sports in Fairbanks, Alaska, in the early 1990s; or with multiple tires seated on two or three standard rims that had been welded or pinned together. Rakower was involved with technical support aspects of the Iditabike (later IditaSport) race, which started in 1987. Since 2002 the race continued on the same trail under the name Iditarod Trail Invitational (ITI). Rakower started hand making extra wide rims for participants by welding two rims together and cutting off the middle ridge known as the snowcat rims 44 mm (1.7 in). S. Rakower produced those rims from 1991 through 1999. Many riders on the Iditarod Trail used a Geax tire with the snow cat rim. Enthusiasts would cut and sew tire-carcasses together to maximize the size of the tire and utilize all the available space between the seat stays and chain stays; this tire and rim combination would maximize the bicycle's footprint, increasing flotation on winter trails. Soon after, Rakower decided to design a 44 mm (1.7 in) rim from scratch and had it produced. SnowCats revolutionized winter cycling, as they could be fitted to nearly any commercially available mountain bike.

Mike Curiak from Colorado set a record on the Iditarod Trail in the 2000 race to Nome.

== Products ==
Surly Bikes released the Pugsley frame in 2005 and began producing Large Marge 65 mm (2.6 in) rims and Endomorph 3.8-inch (97 mm) tires in 2006. The Pugsley frame, rim, and tire offering made fatbikes commercially available in local bike shops worldwide. The Pugsley bikes also featured the offset wheel and frame build. Fatback Bikes came online in 2007 adding the carbon Corvus fatbike. Another Alaskan brand 9:zero:7 joined in 2010 also offering a carbon fatbike. Other bike manufacturers have also entered the fatbike market recently including Trek, with the Farley, Salsa with the Beargrease and Mukluk, and Specialized with the Fatboy and On=One with the Fatty. Others followed since 2014 Rocky Mountain, Felt, Kona, Pivot and many more. Since 2014, Dorel Sports has utilized their Mongoose brand to make fatbikes even more accessible to the general public, with models such as the Beast, Dolomite, Hitch, and Malus selling for around $250, considerably less than their higher-priced predecessors. Until approximately 2012, the TommiSea company of Virginia Beach built fat bikes for use on beach sand.

== Events ==
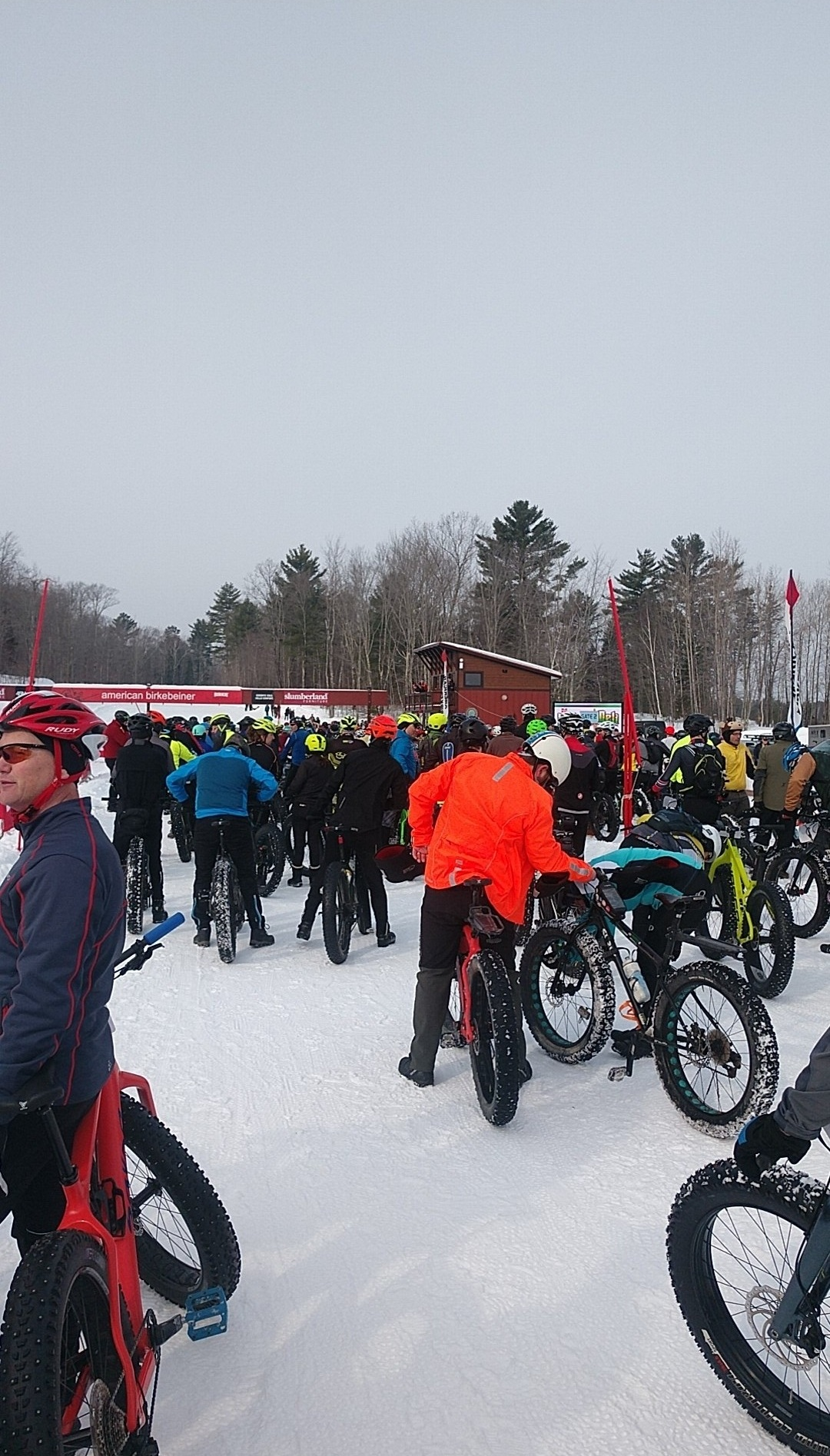
Racers at the 2019 Fat Bike Birkie in Cable, Wisconsin

As the popularity of fatbikes has expanded, fatbike specific events (races, race series, tours, and festivals) have emerged. Examples include the Snow Bike Festival, the annual Global Fatbike Summit (since 2012), the Fatbike Birkie race which is part of the Great Lakes Fatbike Series (2014–2015 season: 8 races held across 3 states), the US Open Fatbike Beach Championships (inaugural, 2015), the USA Cycling Fat Bike National Championship (inaugural, 2015), the Ontario-based Substance Projects OnFatbikeSeries (OFBS), the 45Nrth Fatbike Triple Crown race series and the UK Fatbike Championships (inaugural, 2013).

In the United States, The Iditarod Trail Invitational (formerly known as Iditabike and Iditasport Extreme and Iditasport Impossible) race in Alaska has grown into an international event offering an extreme 130-mile (210 km), 350-mile (560 km) and 1,000-mile (1,600 km) distances. The Fat Bike World Championship (FBWC) also takes place in Alaska, in the city of Anchorage. The Fat Bike Birkie is the largest race for recreational riders in the United States, which is a part of the American Birkebeiner Ski Festival in February, that transforms Cable Wisconsin’s Birkie Trail into a fat biking race course for one weekend only and attracts over 1,200+ riders.

The event spurred the creation of many other winter ultra events in the United States, Canada and Europe that are accepted qualifiers to get into this Invitational.

A number of extreme expeditions have also been made on fatbikes. In December 2012 Eric Larsen attempted to ride a fatbike to the South Pole, but made it only a quarter of the way before he had to turn around. Maria Leijerstam became the first to cycle to the South Pole, across the South Pole Traverse road on a tricycle with fatbike tires. On 21 January 2014, Daniel P. Burton became the first person to ride a bike across Antarctica to the South Pole, starting at Hercules Inlet and biking 1,247 km (775 mi) to the South Pole on a carbon fiber Borealis Yampa fatbike with 4.8 in (120 mm) wide tires.

Popular fatbiking destinations are predominantly found in the northern latitudes of the United States, Canada, and some Nordic countries.

== Gallery ==
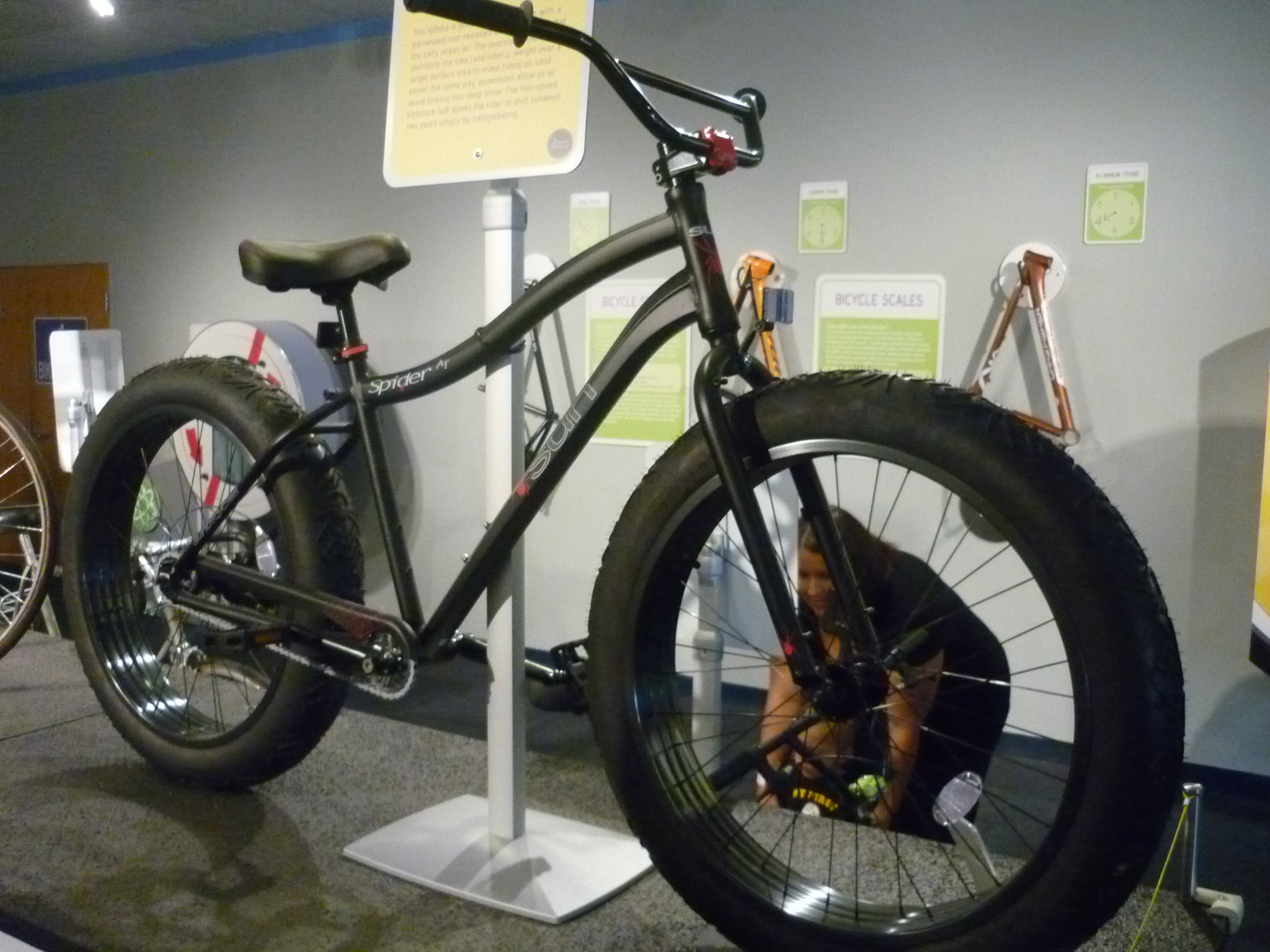
Sun Spider AT fat tire bicycle on display at the Carnegie Science Center in Pittsburgh, Pennsylvania, United States

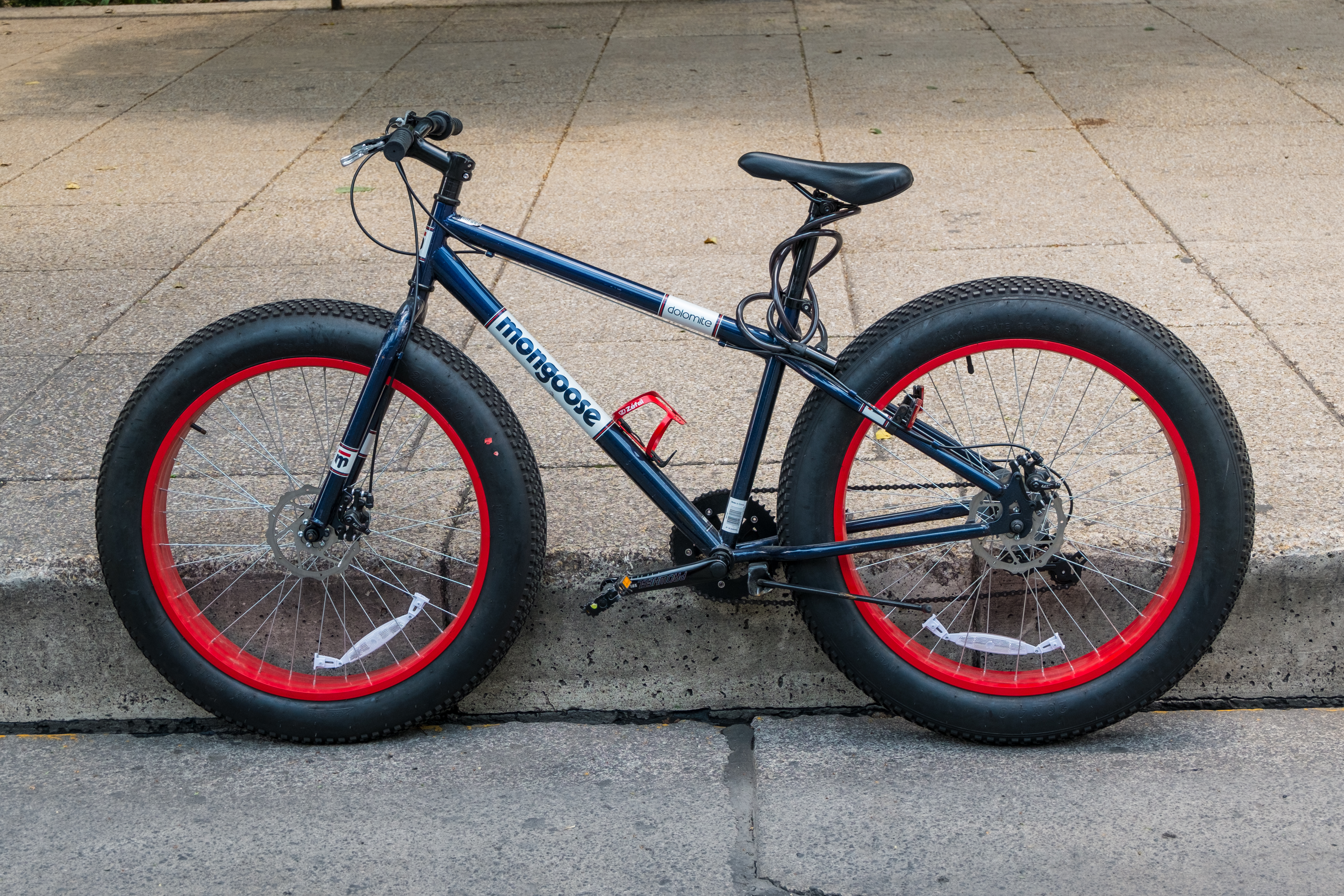
Fatbike in Mexico

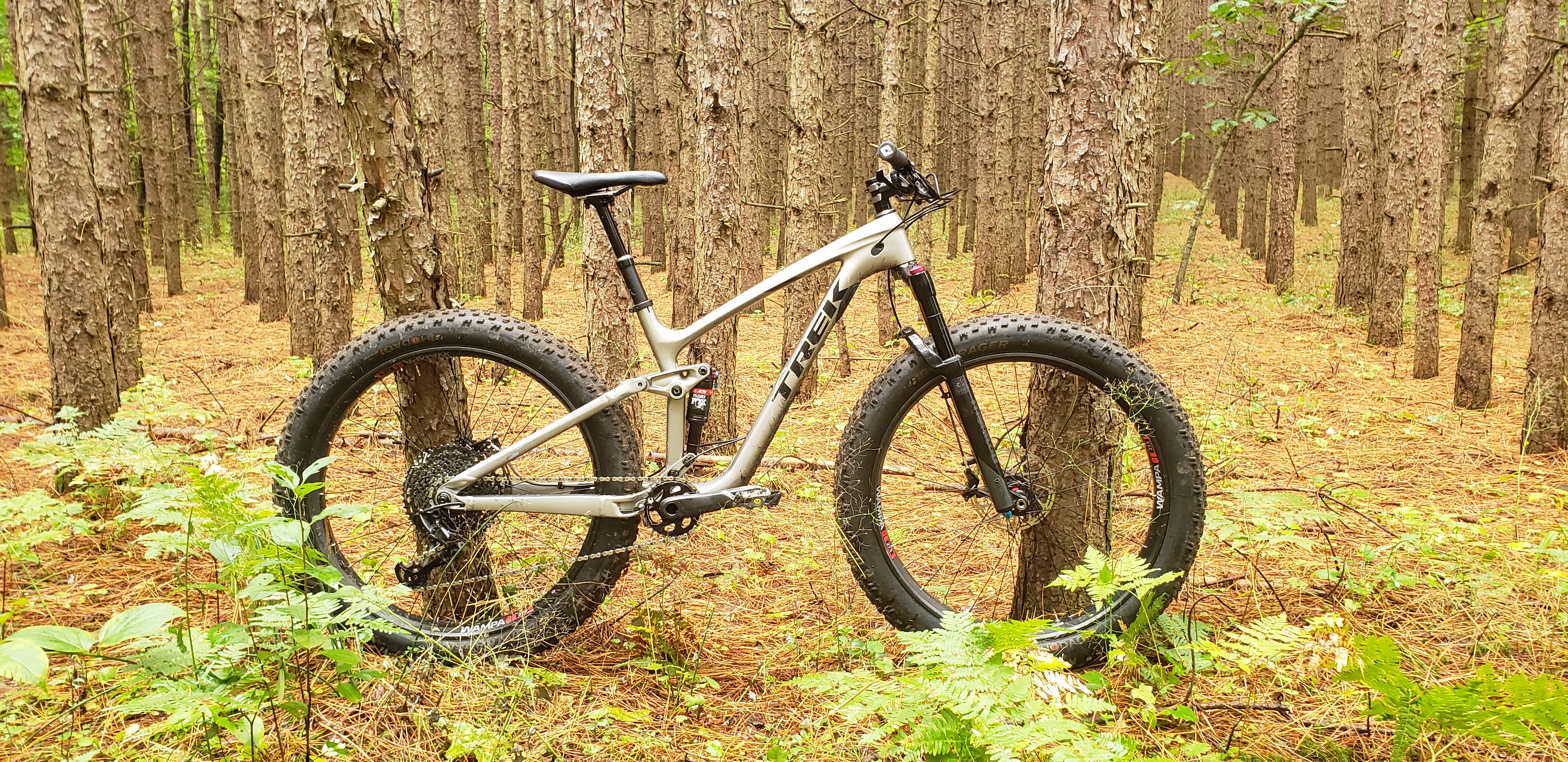
Full Suspension fat-tire bike

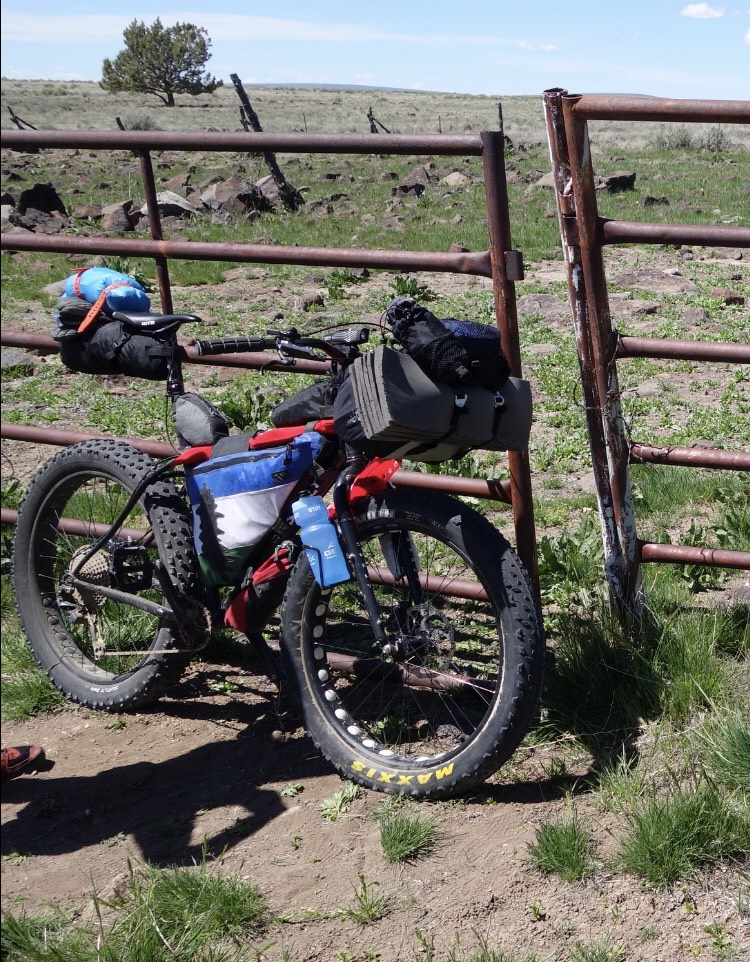
Bikepacking in the U.S. state of Oregon

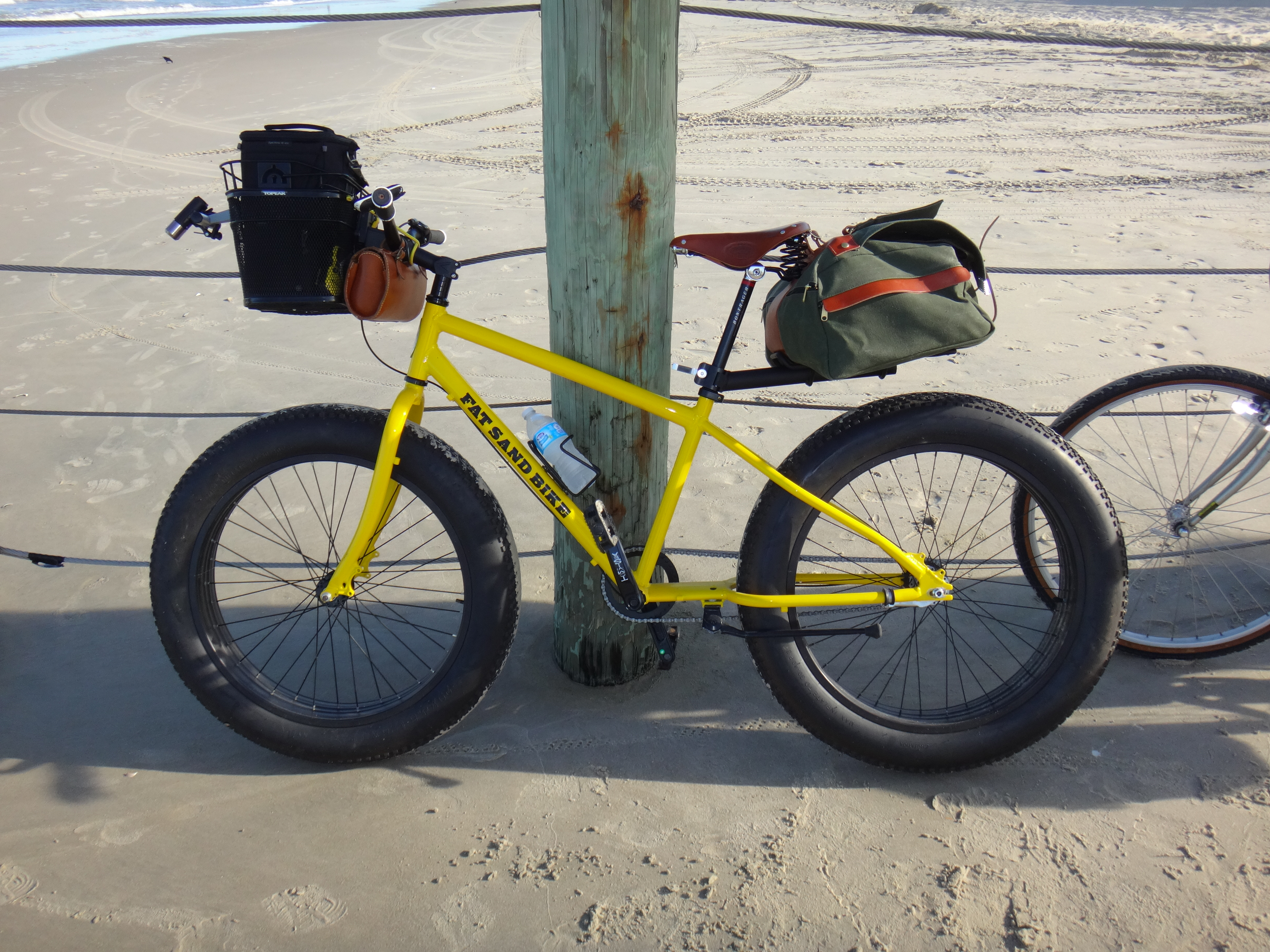
TommiSea Fat Sand Bike equipped for long-distance beach trekking, photographed at the Virginia-North Carolina border.

== See also ==
- Antarctica Cycling Expeditions
- Cargo bike
- Electric bicycle
- Hunting
- Mountain bike
- Outline of cycling
- Reverse trike
