= Inspired Cycle Engineering =

English bicycle manufacturer

ICE Recumbent Trikes
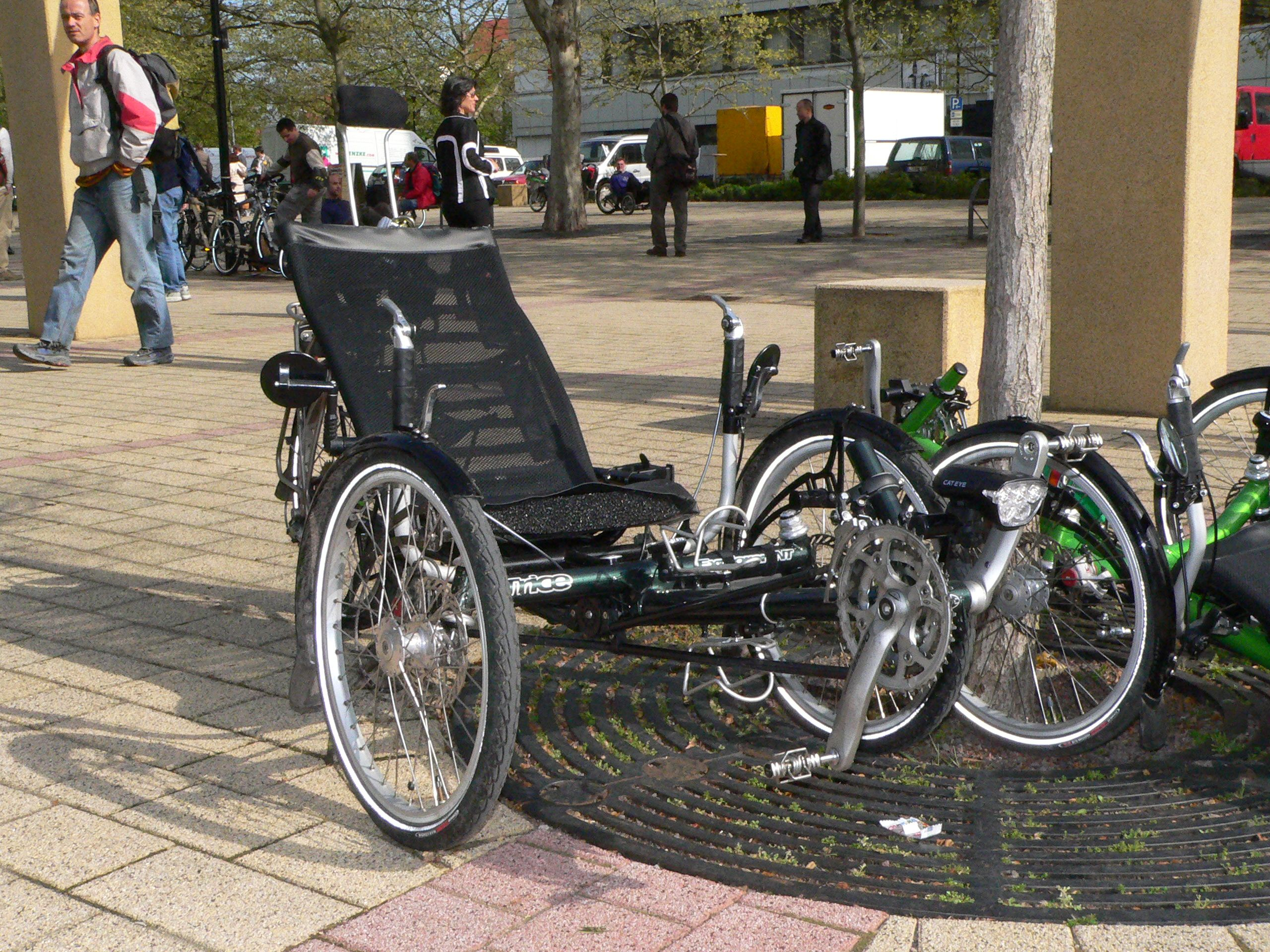
- 2005 Trice Explorer NT
- Predecessor: Trice (1986)
- Founded: 1999
- Headquarters: Falmouth, Cornwall, England
- Products: recumbent bicycles
- Website: www.icetrikes.co

Inspired Cycle Engineering (ICE, ICE Recumbent Trikes) is a manufacturer of recumbent tricycles, based in Falmouth, Cornwall.

In 2013, ICE designed a custom-built trike called the Polar Cycle for Maria Leijerstam on her record-breaking ride to the South Pole. The design was based on a standard ICE SPRINT recumbent.

In late 2022 the company transitioned to be a 100% employee owned trust (EOT).

== Models ==
As of Feb 2026, ICE's product lineup includes only tadpole trikes, with two front wheels and one rear wheel.

- VTX
- SPRINT X
- SPRINT X TOUR/Pixel
- ADVENTURE
- ADVENTURE HD
- FULL FAT

== See also ==
- List of bicycle manufacturers
