= Juan Menéndez Granados =

Spanish cyclist

- Born: Pravia, Spain
- Other names: "Juan Sin Miedo" ("Fearless Juan")
- Occupation: Athlete/Explorer
- Known for: Solo bicycle expeditions in remote locations around the world.
- Website: www.juansinmiedo.es

Juan Menéndez Granados (Pravia, Spain) is a Spanish adventure cyclist known for solo bicycle expeditions in remote locations around the world. As a youth, Juan had a passion for adventure. He has pedaled his way through the Amazon jungle, the Australian desert, the Siberian tundra, the Andes, the Canadian Arctic, and Antarctica. Later on, as well in Atacama Desert, Mongolia, Patagonia, United States and Australia again.

He was awarded the "Premio Viaje del Año: Baikal, sólo en el hielo" (Journey of the Year Award: Baikal, solo on the ice) in 2011 by the Spanish Geographic Society.

Juan completed a 46-day expedition reaching the South Pole using a fatbike and skis in January 2014. Juan pedaled about 775 miles (1,247 km) from Hercules Inlet to the South Pole. He became the first to do it solo, unsupported and unassisted. He survived the last 4 days with no food, just drinking chocolate powder and sunflower oil.

== Expeditions ==
- 2019. Australia (Oceania). Perth-Darwin. 4,805 kilometers.
- 2018. Deserts in USA (North America). 3,747 kilometers.
- 2018. Patagonia (South America). 2,700 kilometers.
- 2017. Mongolia (Asia). 2,685 kilometers.
- 2016. Atacama Desert (South America). 1,839 kilometers.
- December 2013 - January 2014. Crossing Antarctica to the South Pole. 1,200 kilometers.
- 2013. Greenland (Europe). 600 kilometers.
- 2012. Greenland (Europe). 100 kilometers approximately.
- 2011. Tanzania-Kilimanjaro (Africa). 1,000 kilometers.
- 2010. Frozen Lake Baikal (Asia). 730 kilometers.
- 2009. Canadian Arctic (North America). 1,800 kilometers.
- November 2008 - February 2009. Australia (Oceania). Broome-Sydney. 5,001 kilometers.
- 2008. Scandinavia in winter (Europe). Helsinki-North Cape. 2,312 kilometers.
- 2006. Urals (Europe-Asia). 4,060 kilometers.
- 2005. Amazon Basin (South America). 6,485 kilometers.
- 2004. High Atlas in Morocco (Africa). 1,400 kilometers.
- 2004. Scotland (Europe). 1,100 kilometers.
- 2003. The Pyrenees (Europe). 1,300 kilometers.

== See also ==
- List of Antarctic cycling expeditions
