= A Winter of Cyclists =

- Directed by: Mike Prendergast
- Starring: Scot Stucky; Kelly Prendergast; Beth Skelley; Dave Krentz; Everard Huggan; Heather McCullough; Janine Leupold; Leslie Mayer; Rob Redmon; Ryan Stucky; Scott Dresser
- Cinematography: Mike Prendergast
- Edited by: Mike Prendergast
- Music by: Kevin MacLeod
- Production company: ChainRing Films
- Release date: September 1, 2013
- Running time: 64 minutes
- Country: United States
- Language: English

A Winter of Cyclists is a 2013 documentary film by Mike Prendergast. The film chronicles a group of Colorado participants as they attempt to complete a 52-day winter bicycle commuting challenge created by Scot Stucky.

The challenge, known as "The Icy Bike Winter Commuting Challenge", was created to encourage people to cycle to work from October to March, during the darker, colder and the snowier months of the year.
