= Wolf Ridge Environmental Learning Center =

School in Minnesota

Coordinates: 47°22′55.06″N 91°11′45.86″W

Wolf Ridge Environmental Learning Center is an accredited school located in Finland, Minnesota that focuses on K–12 environmental education.

== History ==
In 1969, Jack Pichotta created a program for students in a high school in Cloquet, Minnesota. The program replaces a week of normal classes and instead teaches about environmental topics. These environmental topics are taught by over 100 environmental specialists. Pichotta joined a group of concerned educators to discuss environmental education in Minnesota. Pichotta and his team decided to use a closed down U.S. Forest Service camp as a school to teach about the environment. The camp, previously named Isabella Job Corps Camp, was renamed Isabella Environmental Learning Center.

In 1974 Pichotta and his team decided that the program would need a new permanent location. Between 1975 and 1985, the program moved to Finland, Minnesota, and eventually evolved into Wolf Ridge, a 3–5 day school.

== Campus ==
Wolf Ridge's main campus was built in the Sawtooth Mountains on a precipice overlooking Lake Superior. The campus contains about 2,000 acres of mixed conifer–hardwood forest. Wolf Ridge has 2 small lakes, Raven Lake and Wolf Lake, as well as several streams. The Baptism River also flows through the property. Hills on campus include the tallest, Mystical Mountain, which stands at approximately 1,500 feet, and Marshal Mountain, which stands at 1,405 feet. The main campus consists of a dining hall, an energy center, an education building, and a science center, as well as two dormitories (East and West) for housing visitors and a staff housing lodge. The West Dorm received Living Challenge certification by the International Living Future Institute in 2021, becoming the first renovation project in the world to receive this designation. Additional campus features include a staff-run organic garden, multiple renewable energy projects, two rock climbing walls, two outdoor ropes courses, 18 miles of trails connected to the Superior Hiking Trail, and cross-country skiing trails in the winter.

== Programs ==
Wolf Ridge offers various programs for visitors of all ages, but the school is primarily known for its school-year outdoor education programming, available to K–12 school groups and hosting over 10,000 students every year. Other programs include summer camps, educational offerings for seniors and families, virtual field trips, a teacher institute, and "graduate naturalist" training in Environmental Education through a partnership with Antioch University New England. The first environmental learning center in the United States to receive K–12 accreditation, Wolf Ridge is the largest environmental learning center in the nation.

== Climate ==
Climate data for Wolf Ridge ELC, Minnesota, 1991–2020 normals: 1400ft (427m)
| Month | Jan | Feb | Mar | Apr | May | Jun | Jul | Aug | Sep | Oct | Nov | Dec | Year |
|---|---|---|---|---|---|---|---|---|---|---|---|---|---|
| Record high °F (°C) | 53 (12) | 62 (17) | 71 (22) | 82 (28) | 93 (34) | 97 (36) | 98 (37) | 95 (35) | 94 (34) | 85 (29) | 71 (22) | 58 (14) | 98 (37) |
| Mean maximum °F (°C) | 38 (3) | 45 (7) | 56 (13) | 69 (21) | 82 (28) | 86 (30) | 90 (32) | 89 (32) | 84 (29) | 73 (23) | 55 (13) | 42 (6) | 92 (33) |
| Mean daily maximum °F (°C) | 19.2 (−7.1) | 24.1 (−4.4) | 35.0 (1.7) | 46.1 (7.8) | 59.5 (15.3) | 69.8 (21.0) | 76.1 (24.5) | 74.3 (23.5) | 65.4 (18.6) | 51.2 (10.7) | 35.6 (2.0) | 24.1 (−4.4) | 48.4 (9.1) |
| Daily mean °F (°C) | 10.1 (−12.2) | 13.7 (−10.2) | 25.0 (−3.9) | 37.1 (2.8) | 49.7 (9.8) | 59.6 (15.3) | 65.3 (18.5) | 63.9 (17.7) | 55.5 (13.1) | 42.6 (5.9) | 28.4 (−2.0) | 16.5 (−8.6) | 38.9 (3.9) |
| Mean daily minimum °F (°C) | 1.0 (−17.2) | 3.3 (−15.9) | 15.0 (−9.4) | 28.2 (−2.1) | 39.8 (4.3) | 49.4 (9.7) | 54.5 (12.5) | 53.5 (11.9) | 45.6 (7.6) | 34.0 (1.1) | 21.1 (−6.1) | 8.9 (−12.8) | 29.5 (−1.4) |
| Mean minimum °F (°C) | −22 (−30) | −18 (−28) | −8 (−22) | 14 (−10) | 28 (−2) | 38 (3) | 45 (7) | 43 (6) | 32 (0) | 22 (−6) | 3 (−16) | −14 (−26) | −25 (−32) |
| Record low °F (°C) | −35 (−37) | −40 (−40) | −25 (−32) | −6 (−21) | 17 (−8) | 32 (0) | 39 (4) | 37 (3) | 27 (−3) | 8 (−13) | −9 (−23) | −27 (−33) | −40 (−40) |
| Average precipitation inches (mm) | 1.34 (34) | 1.17 (30) | 1.66 (42) | 2.68 (68) | 3.52 (89) | 4.05 (103) | 3.25 (83) | 3.31 (84) | 3.30 (84) | 3.51 (89) | 2.72 (69) | 2.01 (51) | 32.52 (826) |
| Average snowfall inches (cm) | 24.00 (61.0) | 15.50 (39.4) | 12.10 (30.7) | 8.50 (21.6) | 0.40 (1.0) | 0.00 (0.00) | 0.00 (0.00) | 0.00 (0.00) | 0.00 (0.00) | 1.50 (3.8) | 10.00 (25.4) | 22.20 (56.4) | 94.2 (239.3) |
Source 1: NOAA
Source 2: XMACIS (records & monthly max/mins)
