= South Pole Traverse =

Highway in Antarctica

- McMurdo–South Pole Highway
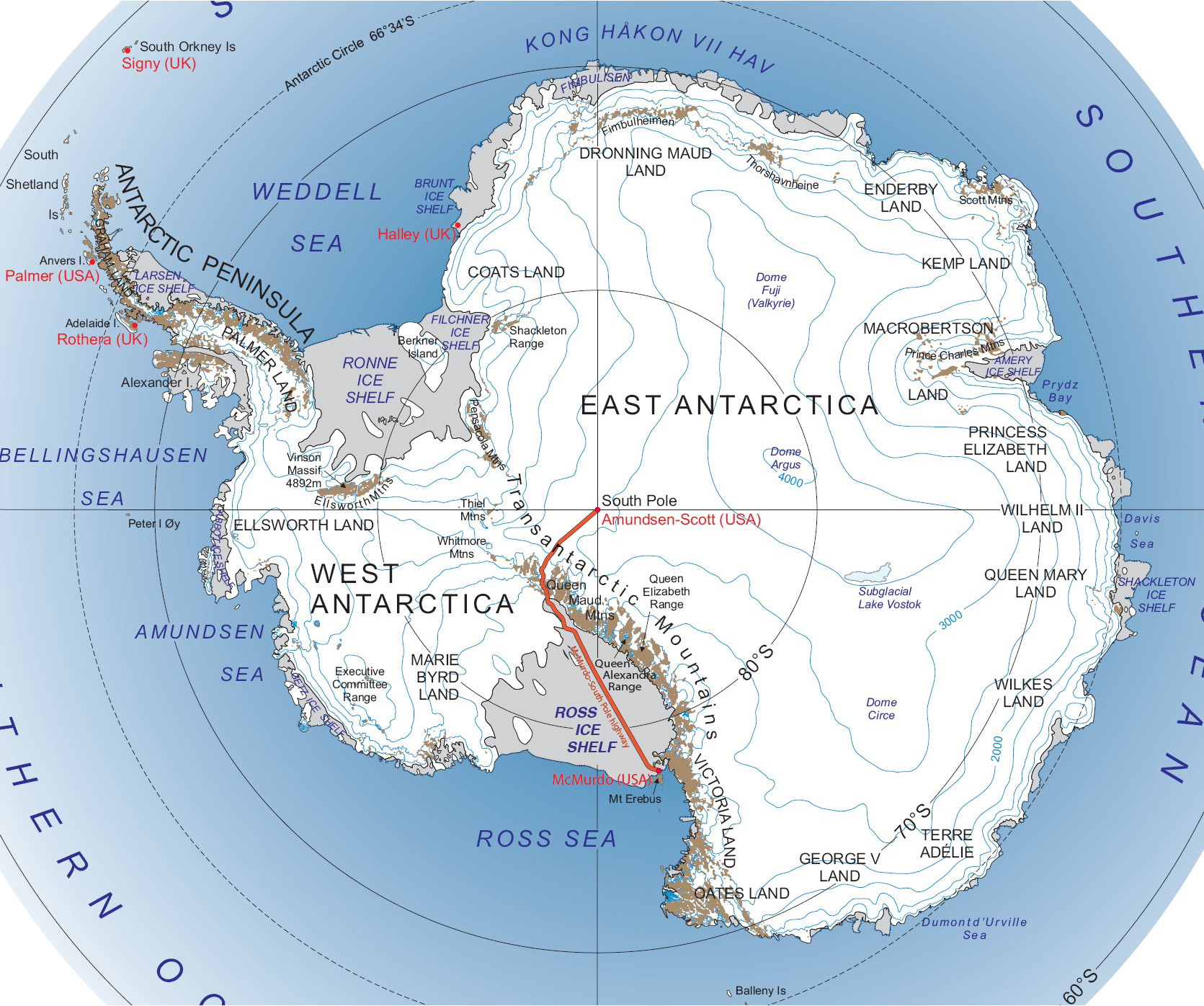
- A red line indicating the path of the traverse

Route information
- Length: 995 mi (1,601 km)
- Existed: 2007–present

Major junctions
- South end: Amundsen–Scott South Pole Station
- North end: McMurdo Station
- Transport in Antarctica

The South Pole Traverse, also called the South Pole Overland Traverse (SPoT), or McMurdo–South Pole Highway is an approximately 995-mile-long (1,601 km) flagged route over compacted snow and ice in Antarctica that links McMurdo Station on the coast to the Amundsen–Scott South Pole Station, both operated by the National Science Foundation of the United States. It was constructed by levelling snow and filling in crevasses; flags mark its route from McMurdo Station across the Ross Ice Shelf to the Leverett Glacier, where the route ascends to the polar plateau and on to the South Pole. It was constructed between 2002 and the end of 2005, when it opened for the first time; it has gained several names and has been called the southernmost road in the world.

Although the South Pole base is about a three-hour flight by LC-130 from McMurdo, the overland traverse can deliver massive amounts of cargo including 75,000 US gallons (280,000 L) of fuel and 20,000 pounds (9,100 kg) of cargo each year. These are carried by land trains (aka convoys) of tracked haulers and sleds. The road also supports polar plateau research camps as well as record breaking attempts. The road passes through two glacial shear zones, which are prone to dangerous crevasses; this results in ongoing maintenance with ground-penetrating radar to check for new crevasses and fill them in.

The opening of the traverse meant the south pole base was freed from the weight and size restrictions of aircraft transport as well as freeing up aircraft for additional research. Tracked vehicles could haul things like telescopes or bulk fuel shipments on the overland route.

== Route description ==
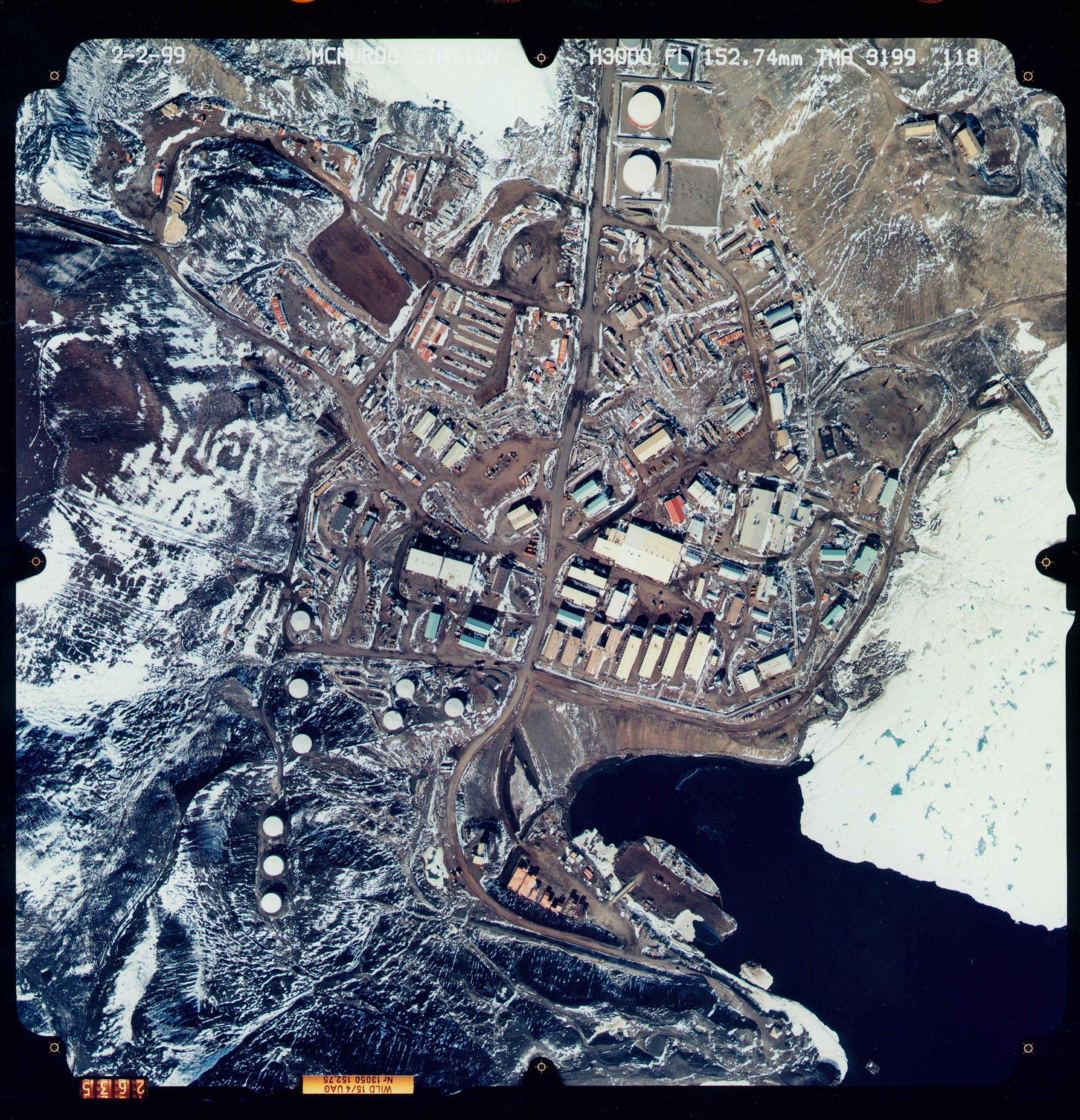
Satellite photo of McMurdo Station with the South Pole Traverse (central road)

After four years of development, the trail was fully traversed for the first time in 2005, with Caterpillar and Case Corporation tractors pulling specialized sleds to deliver fuel and cargo from McMurdo Station to Amundsen–Scott South Pole Station in about 40 days. The return trip to McMurdo Station, with less cargo, is substantially quicker. Construction started during the 2002-03 southern summer field season. It was finished in the 2005-2006 southern summer.

The McMurdo Ice Shelf and the Antarctic Plateau are relatively stable. Most crevasses occur in the short steep shear zone between them, where the road climbs along Leverett Glacier from near the southernmost point of the Ross Ice Shelf to the Antarctic Plateau more than 2,000 meters (6,600 ft) above sea level. This section required much more construction work than planned, and requires maintenance each season, because the ice sheets are constantly flowing outwards from their center.

The route has delivered major cost savings each year compared to air cargo delivery and had reduced the number of flights to the south pole base from about 400 yearly to 75 as of 2016. The route changes length each year slightly due to shifting ice and has grown from 1,028 to 1,030 miles (1,654 to 1,658 km). The journey to the South Pole, which is at 10 thousand feet altitude, normally takes about 25 days. The route back is easier, as they are no longer carrying as much fuels or supplies, and takes about ten days.

== History ==
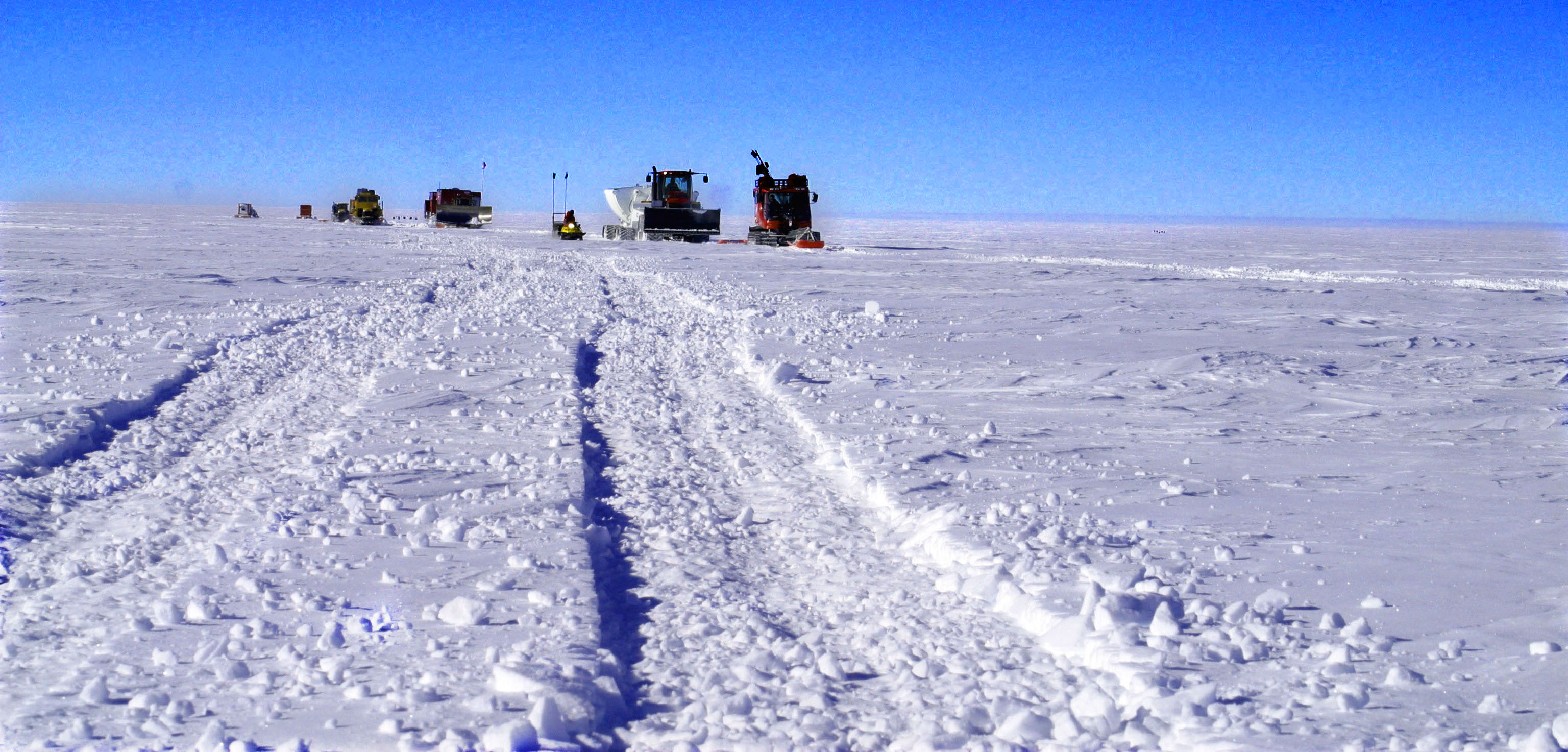
Cargo caravan on the ice highway in early 2006

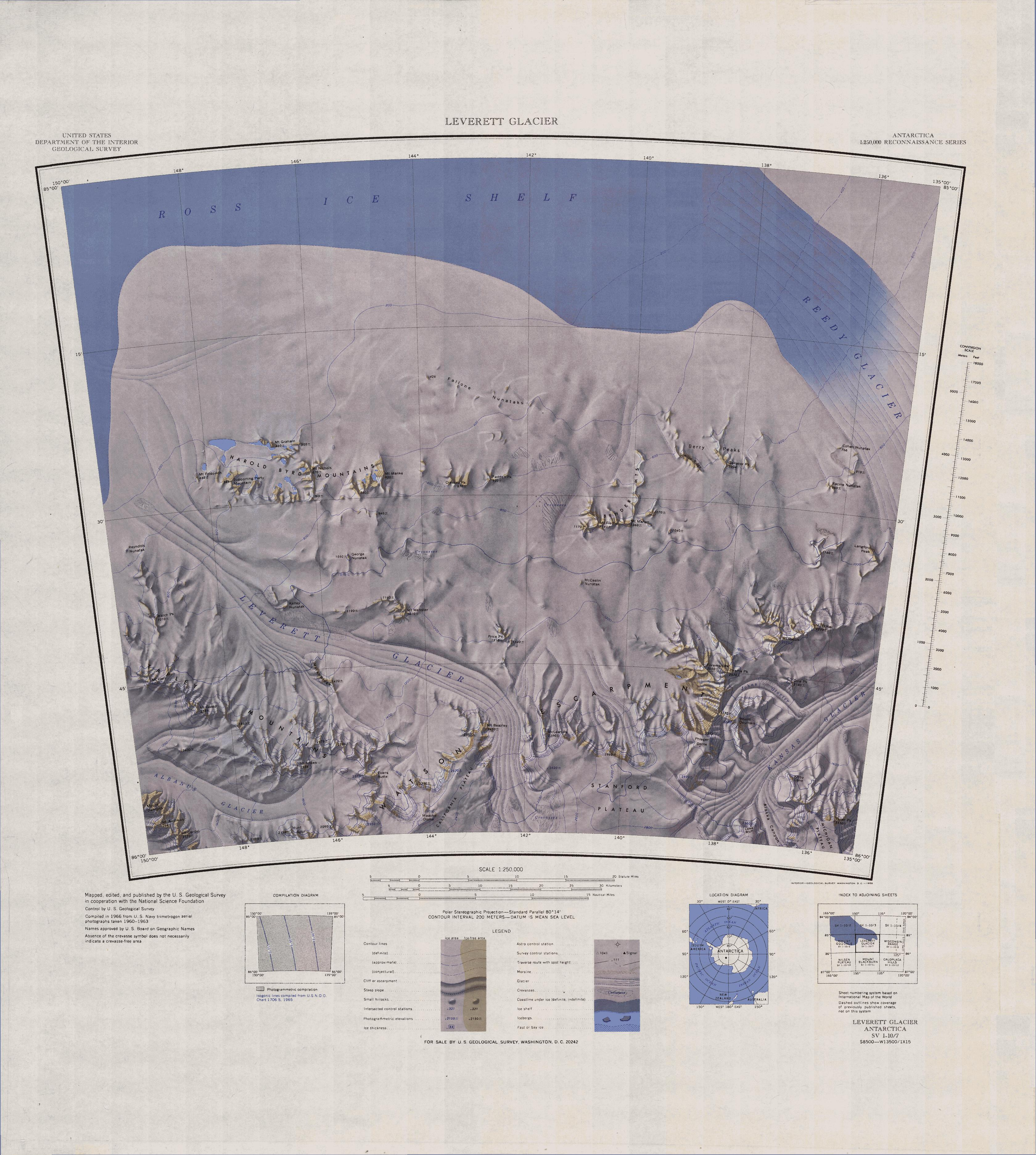
Topographic Map Sheet Leverett Glacier 1:250,000

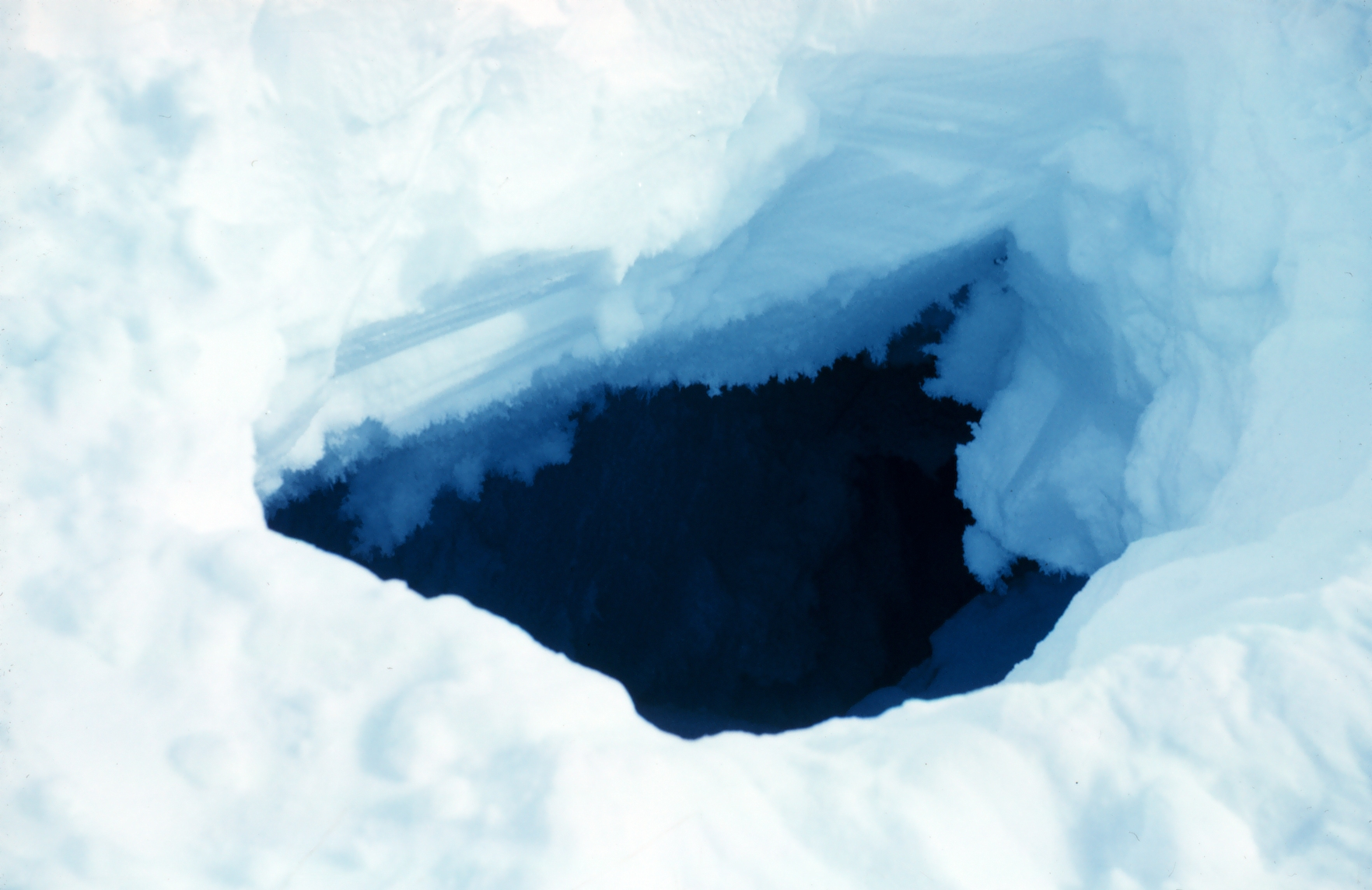
Crevasses, sometimes hundreds of feet deep, pepper some areas of the Antarctic

The National Science Foundation (NSF) funded a new "Traverse Program" in an effort to lower cost and potentially develop a more reliable method of supplying the South Pole Station. Bad weather at McMurdo some summers has reduced the total number of supply flights the NSF could make to bring in construction supplies and scientific equipment. In addition, a single convoy using the traverse to deliver fuel saves an estimated 45 flights and dramatically lowers the carbon footprint over the use of aircraft by 99%. After a one-year hiatus, a traverse team re-occupied the trail during the 2007–08 season after extensive work and completed the first operational traverse in 2008–09.

The road would also facilitate the movement of heavy equipment needed to implement NSF's proposed South Pole Connectivity Program, a planned optical fiber link between the South Pole and the French–Italian Concordia Station located at Dome C at the edge of the Antarctic Plateau; Concordia has 24-hour access to geosynchronous satellites. Such satellites cannot be used at the poles since they are below the horizon; the South Pole now uses a few older, low-bandwidth satellites that dip sufficiently south of the equator to be usable for several hours daily. These satellites are near the end of their life. The road to McMurdo might provide a regularly maintained alternate route for such a link; however, opinions vary as to the shear zone section's suitability for a long-term cable. The NSF may also choose to deploy several special purpose satellites in polar orbits.

A 7 February 2006 NSF press release stated that 110 short tons (100 t) of cargo had been delivered overland to the South Pole Station in a "proof of concept" of the highway.

On its return from the South Pole the Moon Reagan Transarctic Expedition achieved a record breaking 13 day traverse by vehicle of SPoT.

In December 2010, a large land train of tracked vehicles got bogged down in a massive snow storm en route to the south pole, and it took several days to dig out.

In February 2013, Maria Leijerstam pedaled a three-wheeled recumbent fatbike over a portion of the South Pole Traverse route, for which she was recognized by Guinness World Records as the first person to arrive at the South Pole by tricycle.

The south pole highway was used by adventurer Colin O'Brady for part of his solo Antarctic trip in 2018. National Geographic noted that this triggered discussions about antarctic records, because some previous records did not have the benefit of the snow road. They comment that O'Brady's two month long trek was a "true sporting feat that deserves respect" but not directly comparable to Børge Ousland's 64 day trek in 1997 which is widely regarded as the first solo traverse of the southern continent, though there were discussions about the use of sail-assistance. In both cases the issue was not that the feat was accomplished, but over the meaning of an "unassisted" traverse.

== Major intersections ==
Region	Location	Mile	km	Destinations	Notes
East Antarctica	Antarctic Plateau	0	0.0	Amundsen–Scott South Pole Station	Southern terminus
West Antarctica	Ross Ice Shelf	994	1,600	General McMurdo Road	Access to southern area of station
West Antarctica	Ross Ice Shelf	995	1,601	McMurdo Station	Northern terminus

== See also ==
- Ice roads
- South Pole–Queen Maud Land Traverse
- McMurdo Station transportation
