= Eric Larsen =

American polar explorer

- Born: Cedarburg, Wisconsin
- Occupations: Polar adventurer, expedition guide, dog musher, educator, author, and photographer
- Known for: Polar Exploration

Eric Larsen is an American Polar adventurer known for his expeditions to the North Pole, South Pole, and Mount Everest.

== Early life ==
Larsen was born 1971 in Cedarburg, Wisconsin. He worked as a guide and educator at Environmental Learning Centers Wolf Ridge and Eagle Bluff.

== Expeditions ==
Last South - South Pole Solo speed record attempt - 2018

In December 2018, Larsen attempted to be the Solo unsupported, unassisted speed record from Hercules Inlet to the South Pole in Antarctica. Larsen encountered unusual weather and snow conditions and aborted his attempt after three weeks.

Jabou Ri First Ascent - 2015

On September 16, Larsen and Ryan Waters became the first to ascend the peak of Nepal's Jabou Ri, a Himalayan peak in an area only recently opened to climbers.

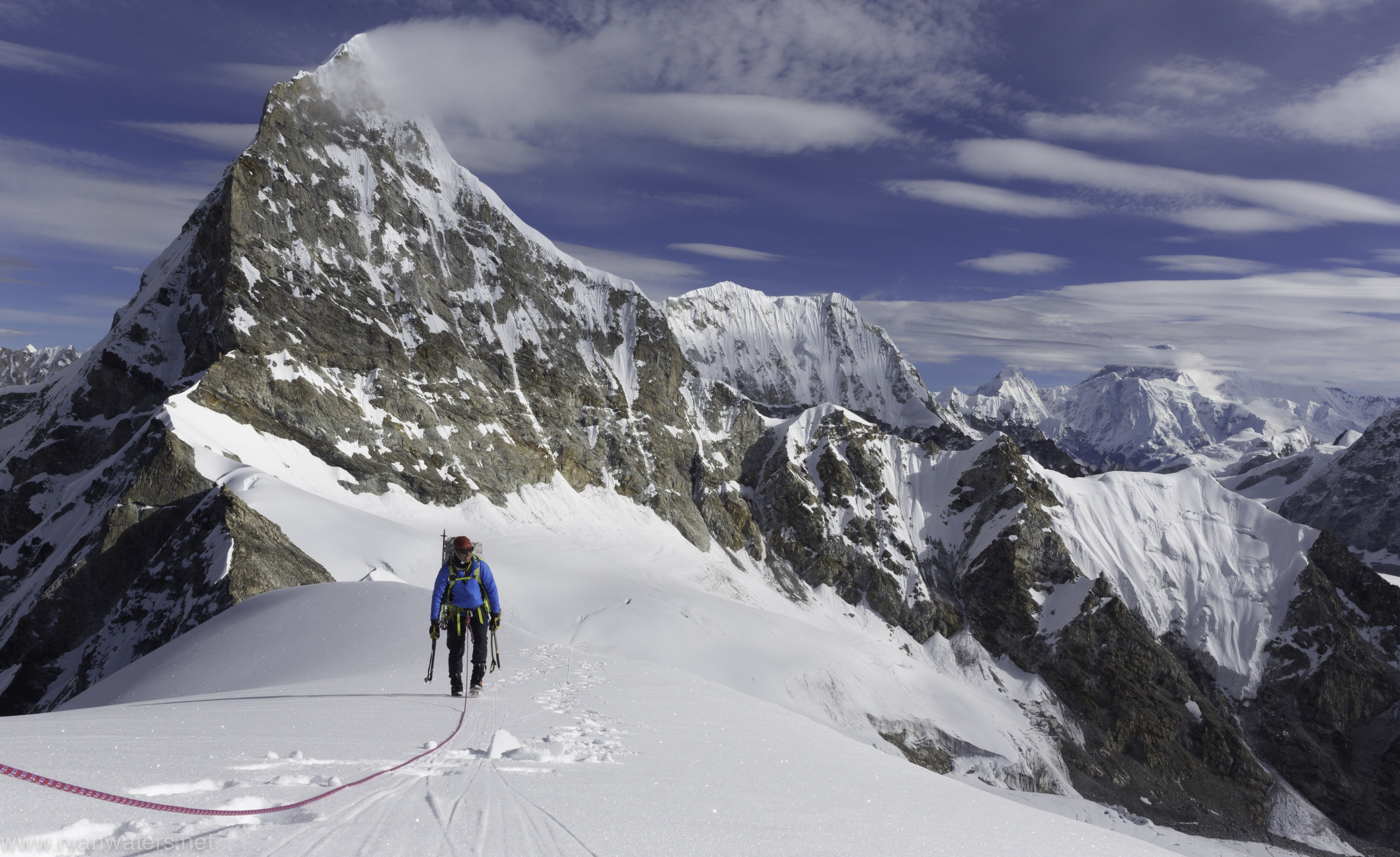
First Ascent Jabou Ri

Last North Expedition - 2014

In March 2014, Larsen and Ryan Waters crossed the Arctic Ocean from Northern Ellesmere Island to the geographic North Pole. Larsen has stated that his expedition may be the last ever to the North Pole because of melting ice due to climate change.

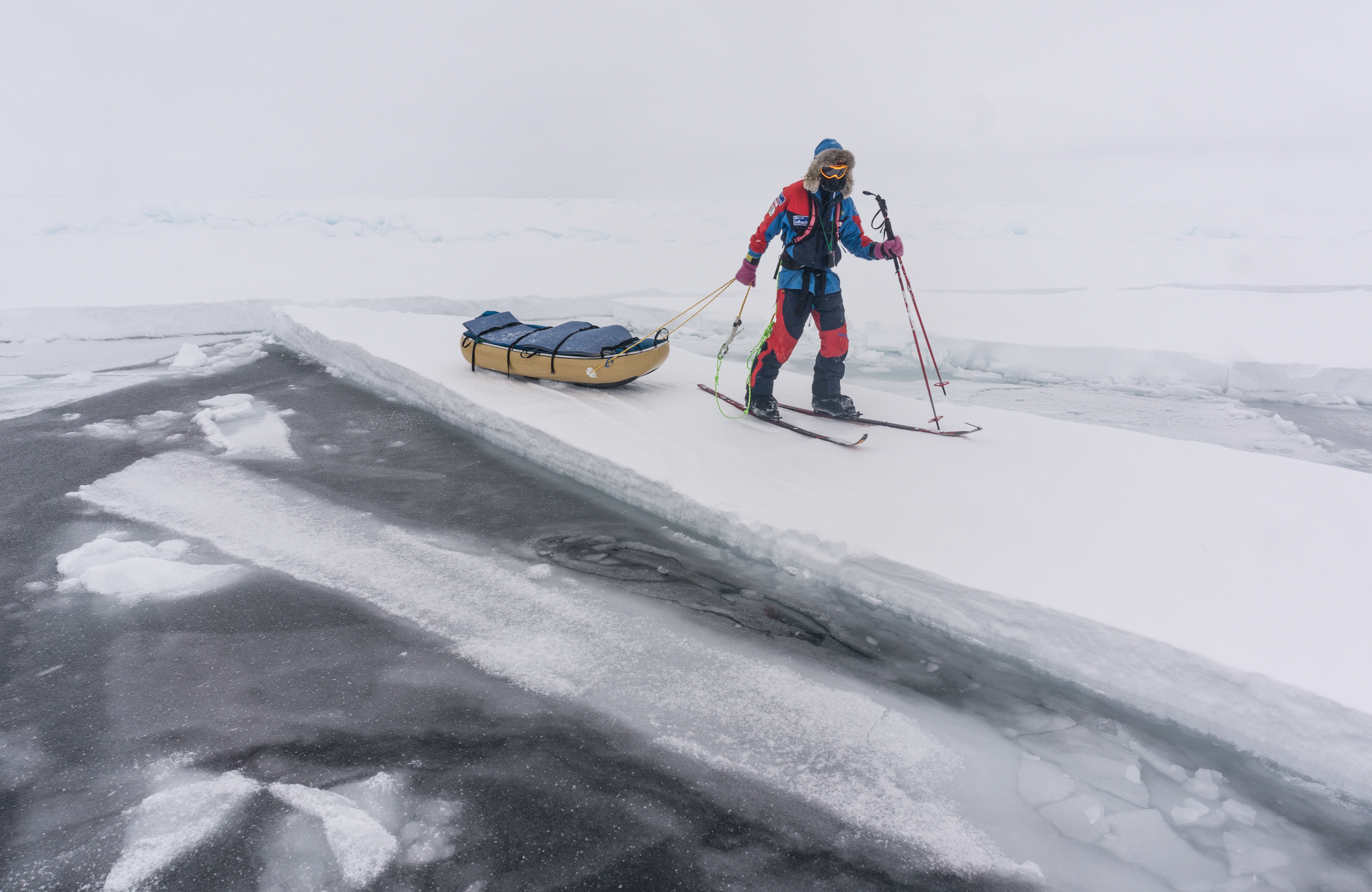
Last North Expedition

Cycle South Expedition - 2012

In December 2012, Eric Larsen attempted to be the first person to bike to the South Pole. Departing Hercules Inlet, he made it 175 miles before turning around. In his attempt he set the record for the most miles traveled by bicycle in Antarctica.

Save the Poles - 2009/2010

During a 365-day period Eric Larsen did expeditions to the North Pole, the South Pole, and Mount Everest. He is the first person to do all three "poles" in one year's time period.

One World Expedition- 2006

In the first successful 'summer' style North Pole expedition Larsen and teammate Lonnie Dupre departed Cape Discovery, Ellesmere Island and arrived at the North Pole on July 2, after 62 days on the ice.

== Book ==
On Thin Ice

In March 2014, Eric Larsen and Ryan Waters set out to traverse nearly 500 miles across the melting Arctic Ocean, unsupported, from Northern Ellesmere Island to the geographic North Pole. Despite being one of the most cold and hostile environments on the planet, the Arctic Ocean has seen a steady and significant reduction of sea ice over the past seven years due to climate change. Because of this, Larsen's and Waters' trip—dubbed the "Last North Expedition"—is expected to be the last human-powered trek to the North Pole, ever.

== Documentary ==
Melting - Last Race to the Pole

Description of the Documentary from Apple Tv: "The Arctic is warming twice as fast as the rest of the globe, so the window to cross the ice to the majestic North Pole is closing quickly. Eric Larsen, one of the most accomplished polar explorers, and Ryan Waters, a veteran extreme mountaineer, risk their lives to reach the North Pole before that opportunity is gone forever."

== Cancer ==
In January 2021, Eric was initially diagnosed with Stage 4 colorectal cancer, but upon further biopsies was categorized as Stage 3b. After a year of intensive chemotherapy, radiation and surgery, he is currently NED (No Evidence of Disease).
