= Maria Leijerstam =

British polar adventurer (born 1978)

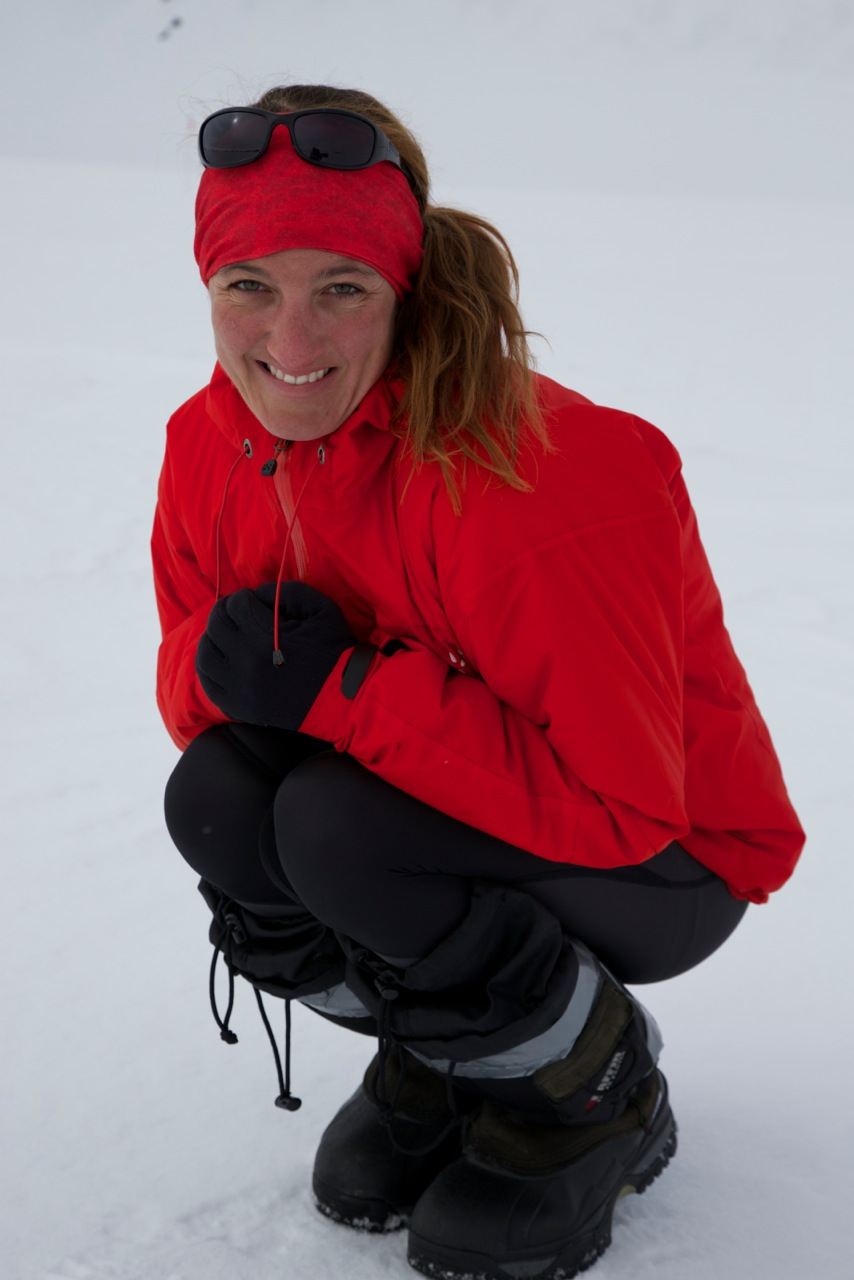
- Born: 1978 (age 47–48); Aberdare, Wales, UK
- Occupations: Business consultant and owner of Burn Series, a family sporting events company
- Known for: First person to cycle to the South Pole
- Website: marialeijerstam.com

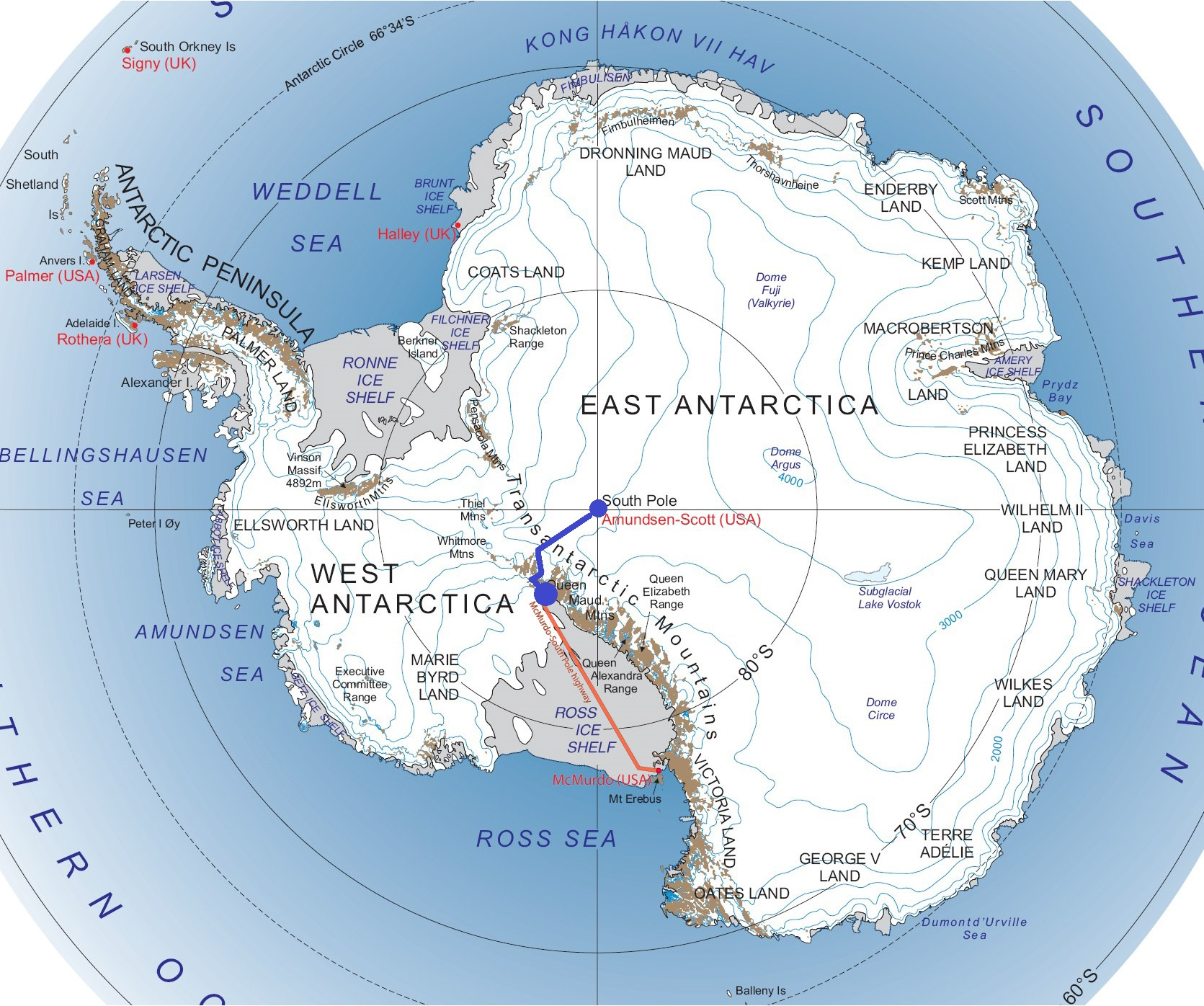
Leijerstam's route (blue) over the South Pole Traverse (red)

Maria Leijerstam is a British polar adventurer. In 2013 she became the first person to cycle to the South Pole from the edge of the continent. Leijerstam started her expedition on the Ross Ice Shelf at the edge of the Antarctic continent, and cycled for 10 to 17 hours each day with no rest days, and the total distance cycled was 638 km (396 mi). Leijerstam's cycle was a three-wheeled design, and she reached the pole faster than any previous skiing expedition.

== Early life ==
In June 1978, Leijerstam was born in Aberdare, Wales, United Kingdom, to Adrianne and Anders Leijerstam.

== Education ==
Leijerstam studied at Cowbridge School in the Vale of Glamorgan followed by a degree in mathematics at Plymouth University.

== Career ==
Leijerstam was a consultant for Siemens, BAE Systems and Ford. She worked in Germany and Sweden for several years, before moving back to Wales where she established the Burn Series of Adventure Races including multi-sport races including running, mountain bike and kayak stages. Mini Burn is the UK's first Adventure Racing Festival aimed at families.

She recently took on running of the family business: Llantrithyd Deer Park. Established in 1645 as part of Sir John Aubrey's estate centred on Llantrithyd Place, the park hosts herds of fallow, red and sika deer and is a supplier of organic venison.

=== Sports ===
During her time at Plymouth University, Leijerstam used the sports facilities of the University Officers Training Corps, a youth organisation of the British Army, and became an enthusiastic outdoor athlete. Over the years, she learned outdoor, water and winter sports, including long-distance running (single and double marathon, ultramarathon) mountaineering, hiking and trekking, skiing, cycling, multisport, canoeing and sailing.

Leijerstam has taken part in competitions all over the world. Her successes include Canoe Marathon Devizes to Westminster International (2014), multi-sport adventure race Patagonian Expedition Race (2013), Surf Ski Race Rhoose Ski Race (2012), Triathlon Ironman UK (2010), Rally Car Racing Land Rover G4 Challenge (2009), Multisport Race Three Peaks Yacht Race (2008) and Turas World Adventure Race (2008).

In 2007, Leijerstam became the first Welsh woman to complete in the Marathon des Sables where she ran six marathons in seven days, battling extreme high temperatures. In 2012, she became the first woman to complete the Siberian Black Ice Race, cycling across Lake Baikal, the longest and deepest frozen freshwater lake in the world.

=== 2013 cycle to the South Pole (White Ice Cycle) ===
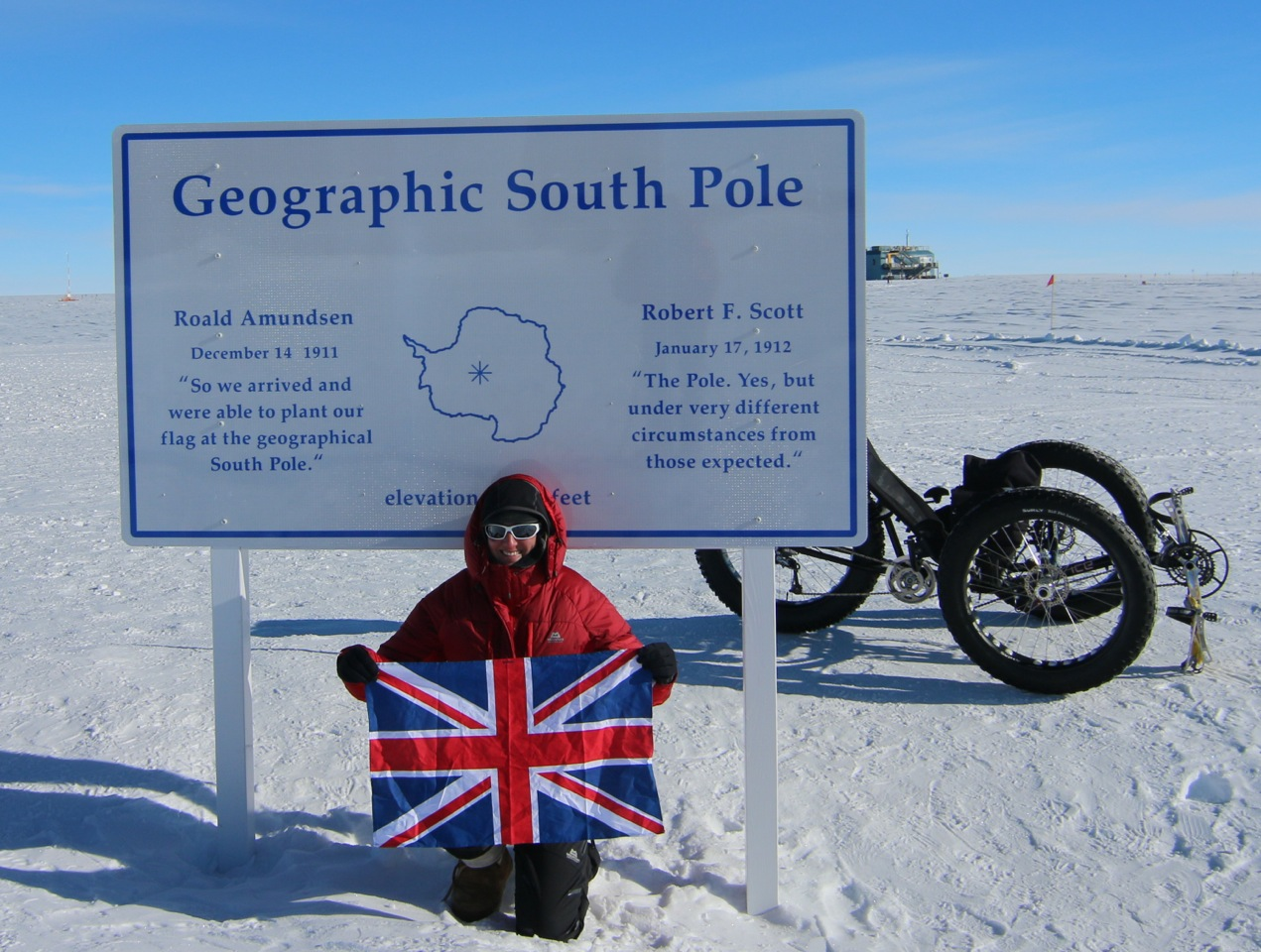
Maria Leijerstam at the geographical South Pole

At the end of 2013, Leijerstam gained a Guinness World Record in an expedition known as the White Ice Cycle, becoming the first person in the world to reach the South Pole by cycling from the edge of the Antarctic continent. She also set the new World Record for the fastest human powered coast to pole traverse, completing her journey in 10 days, 14 hours and 56 minutes.

Leijerstam completed the almost-650 km (400 mi) route from the Ross Ice Shelf on the edge of the Antarctic to the South Pole in just over 10 days. During the trip, she followed the South Pole Traverse, which led her on a steep climb through the Transantarctic Mountains, over the 2,941 m (9,649 ft) high Leverett Glacier and 500 km (310 mi) above the Antarctic plateau. Whilst riding, she fought against extreme cold, strong winds and snow drifts on the track.

She rode a custom-built recumbent trike made by Inspired Cycle Engineering, called the Polar Cycle, with 4.5 in (110 mm) wide balloon tires and a modified gear shift that allowed Leijerstam to pass through snowdrifts and climb steep inclines. Ten years later, in 2023, Inspired Cycle Engineering named a special edition of its a Full Fat recumbent trike after Maria Leijerstam.

=== Business pursuits and public profile ===
A television documentary about Leijerstam's record-breaking cycle was made by ITV and released on Amazon Prime Video. She celebrated the tenth anniversary of her polar world record by cycling from the east to west of Ireland to the South Pole Inn, an historic public house established by the explorer Tom Crean. Accompanied by Nick Russill, they completed the 320 km ride in just under 27 hours. Following the cycle to the South Pole Inn, Leijerstam released an updated 10th Anniversary Edition of her book "Cycling to the South Pole, A World First."

Leijerstam has pursued public speaking opportunities and runs a multi-sport company called Burn Series. The adventure racing events held across South Wales are both a challenge and for fun, with the Mini Burn, a shorter and more diverse ‘triathlon’, aimed towards families. The events consist of running, mountain biking, kayaking and orienteering. The Mini Burn is the only adventure race in the UK where both parents and children can compete together.

== See also ==
- Roald Amundsen
- List of Antarctic cycling expeditions
- Robert Falcon Scott
