= Transport in Antarctica =

Transportation methods in Antarctica

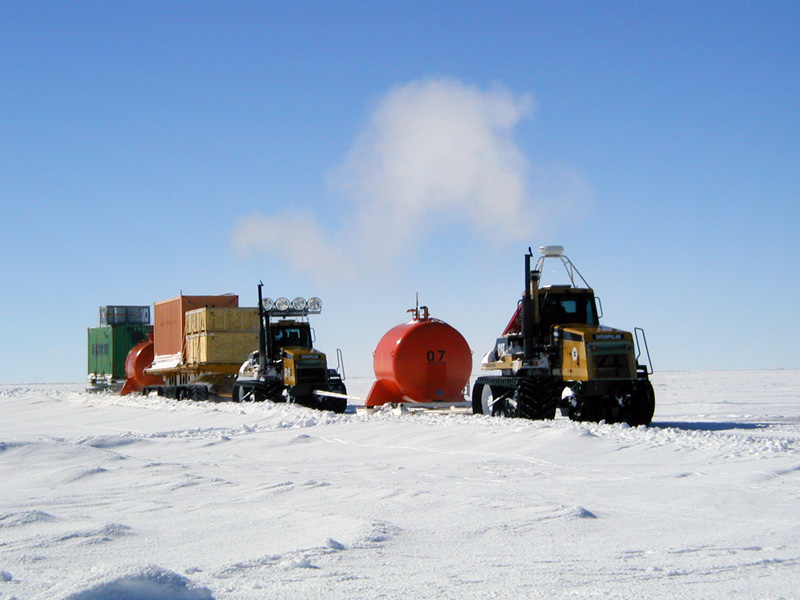
Part of a traverse, which was bringing fuel, food, and other supplies from Dumont d'Urville Station to Dome C (Concordia Station). January 2005

Transport in Antarctica has transformed from explorers crossing the isolated remote area of Antarctica by foot to a more open era due to human technologies enabling more convenient and faster transport, predominantly by air and water, but also by land as well. Transportation technologies on a remote area like Antarctica need to be able to deal with extremely low temperatures and continuous winds to ensure the travelers' safety. Due to the fragility of the Antarctic environment, only a limited amount of transport movements can take place and sustainable transportation technologies have to be used to reduce the ecological footprint. The infrastructure of land, water and air transport needs to be safe and sustainable. Currently thousands of tourists and hundreds of scientists a year depend on the Antarctic transportation system.

Important parts of Antarctic transport include ships, but unlike warmer areas access may also require an icebreaker ship. Aircraft and airports are important but have some unique aspects; airstrips may be built on ice or compacted snow and aircraft with ski may be used. On the ground, transport includes traditionally wheeled vehicles adapted to the cold, but also vehicles with skis, such as snowmobiles are important as are towed sleds.

== Land transport ==
=== Roads and traverses ===
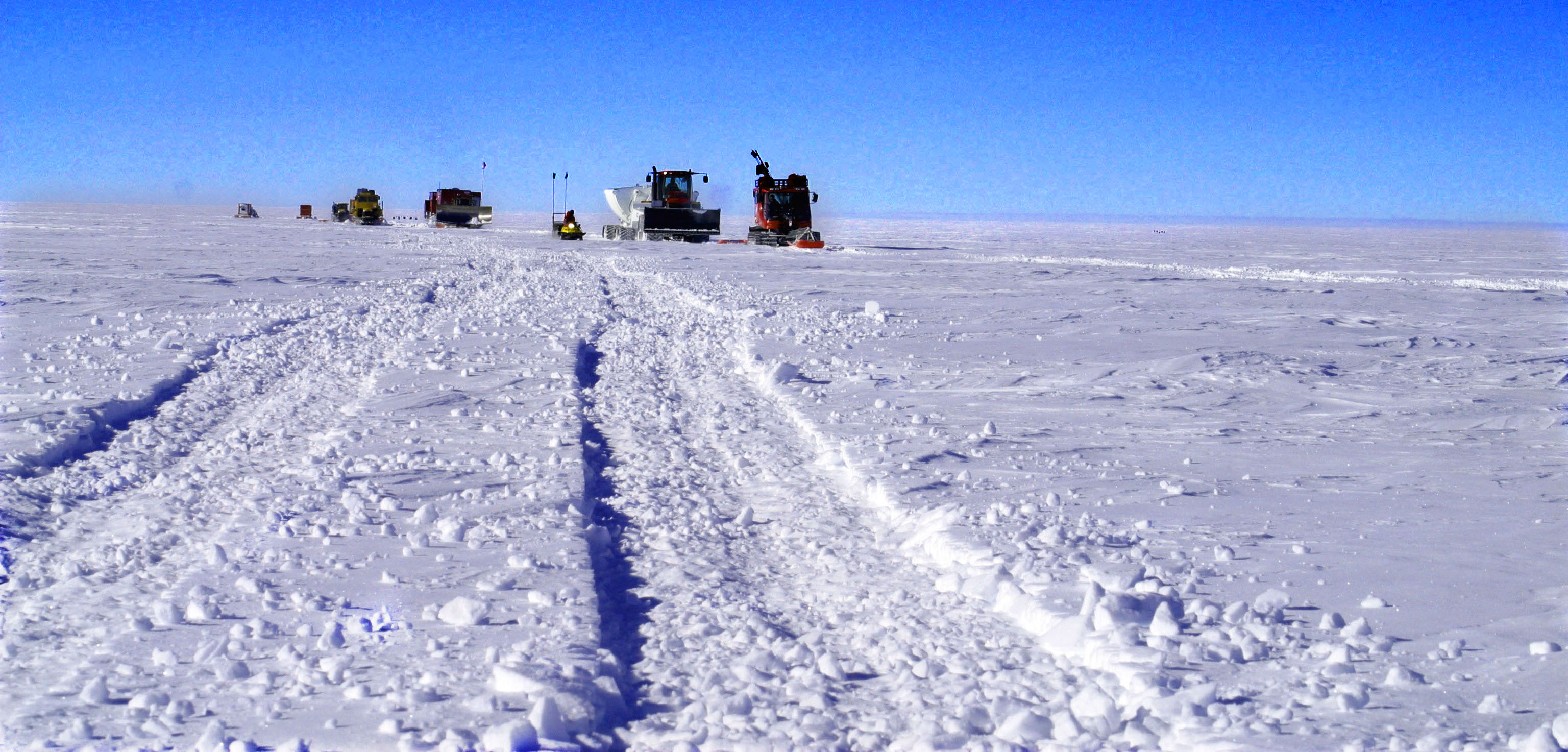
Cargo caravan on the ice highway in early 2006

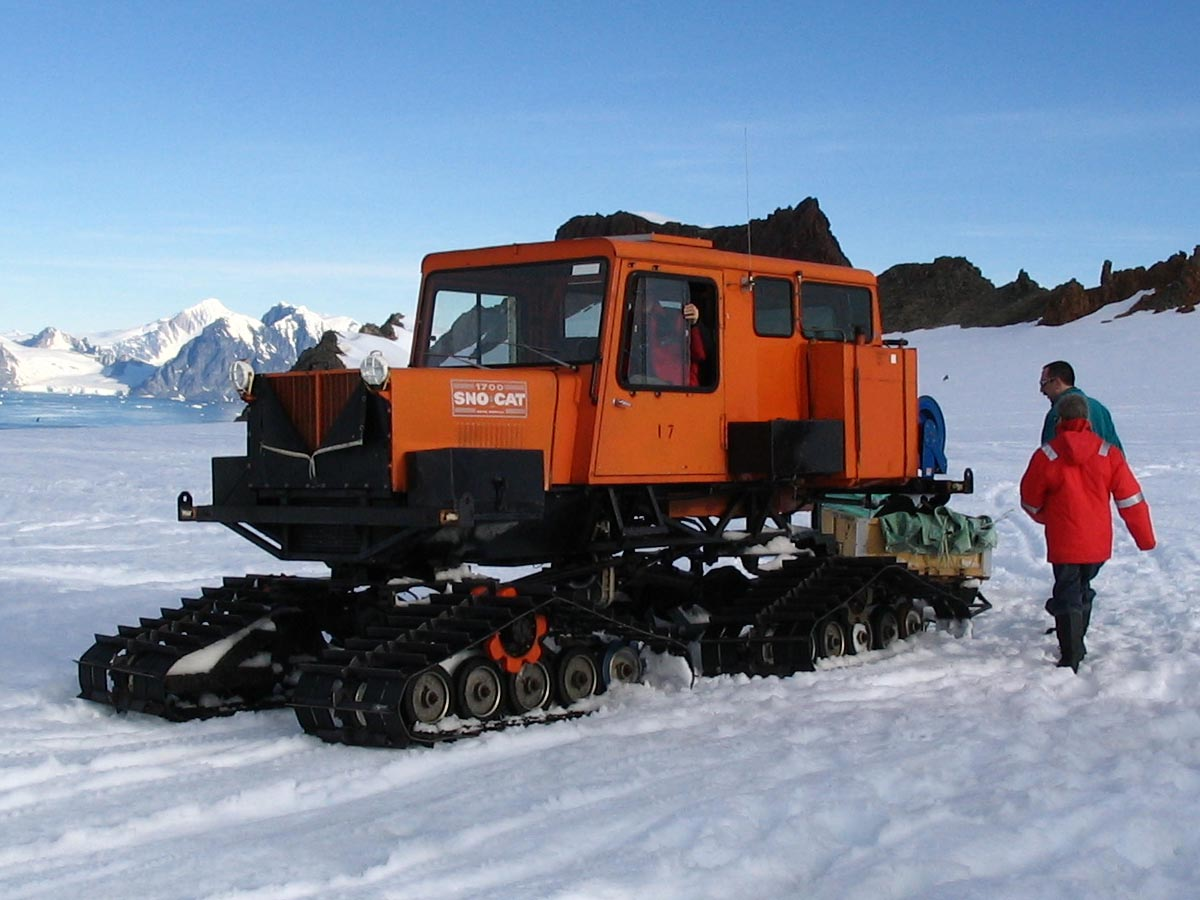
A Tucker Sno-Cat at Rothera on Adelaide Island off Antarctica

Winds continuously blow snow on roads in Antarctica.

The South Pole Traverse (McMurdo–South Pole highway) is approximately 1,450 km (900 mi) long and links the United States McMurdo Station on the coast to the Amundsen–Scott South Pole Station. It was constructed by leveling snow and in crevasses, but is not paved. There are flags to mark the road.

Also, the United States Antarctic Program maintains two ice roads during the summer. One provides access to Pegasus Field on the Ross Ice Shelf. The ice road between Pegasus Field and McMurdo Station is about 23 kilometres (14 mi). The other road provides access to the Ice Runway, which is on sea ice. The road between the Ice Runway and McMurdo Station varies in length from year to year depending on many factors, including ice stability. These roads are critical for resupplying McMurdo Station, Scott Base, and Amundsen–Scott South Pole Station.

=== Vehicles ===
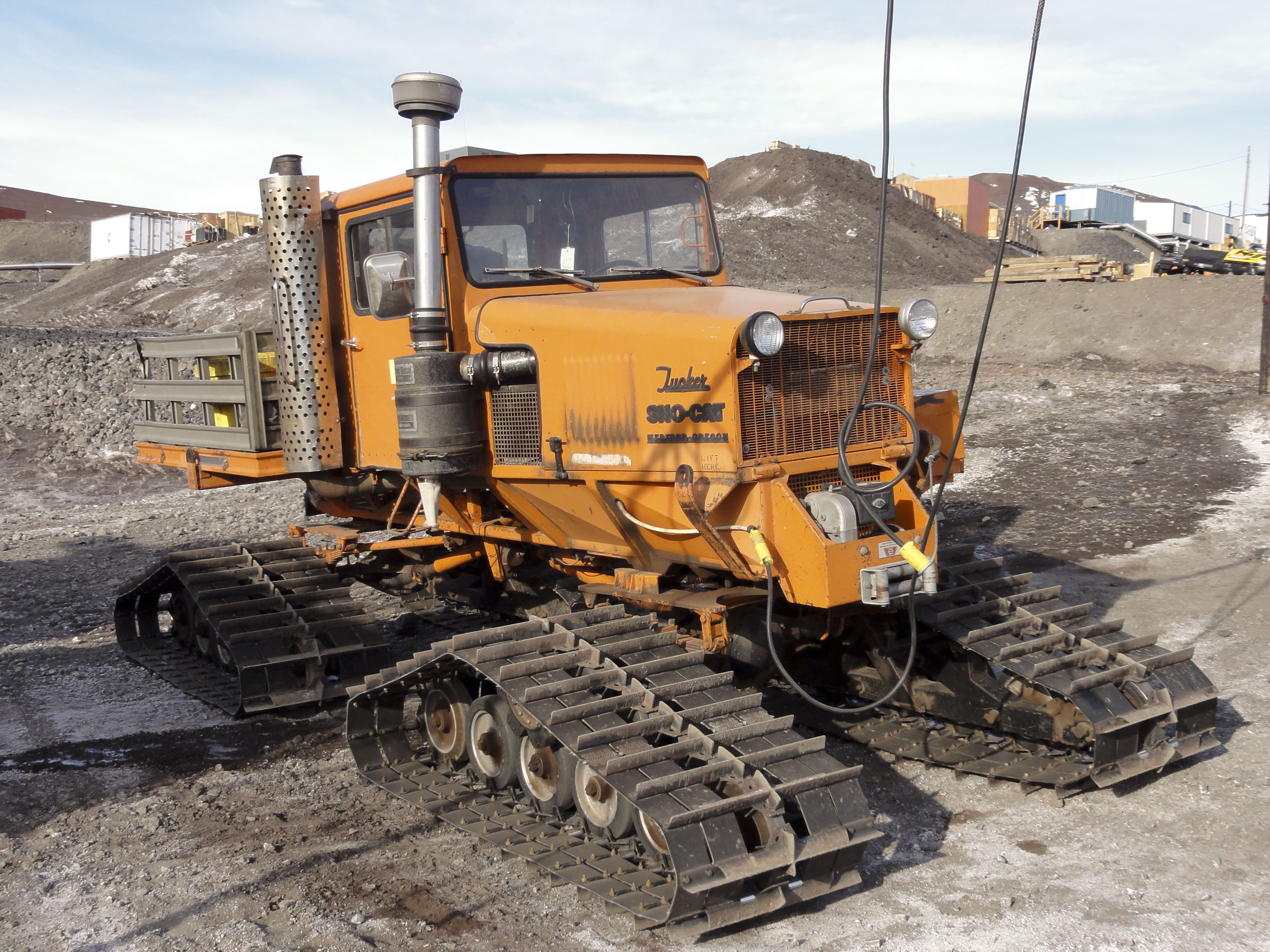
Tucker Sno-cat at McMurdo Station, Ross Island. 2010

The scarcity and poor quality of road infrastructure limits land transportation by conventional vehicles.

A normal car on tires has very limited capability in Antarctic conditions. Scientific bases are often built on snow-free areas (oases) close to the ocean. Around these stations and on a hard packed snow or ice, tire based vehicles can drive but on deeper and softer snow, a normal tire-based vehicle cannot travel. Due to these limitations, vehicles on belts have been the preferred option in Antarctica. In 1997, two specialized cars with very large tires running tire pressure as low as 1.5 psi (0.10 bar) travelled onto the high Antarctica Plateau, giving strong indication that tire based vehicles could be an option for efficient travelling in Antarctica.

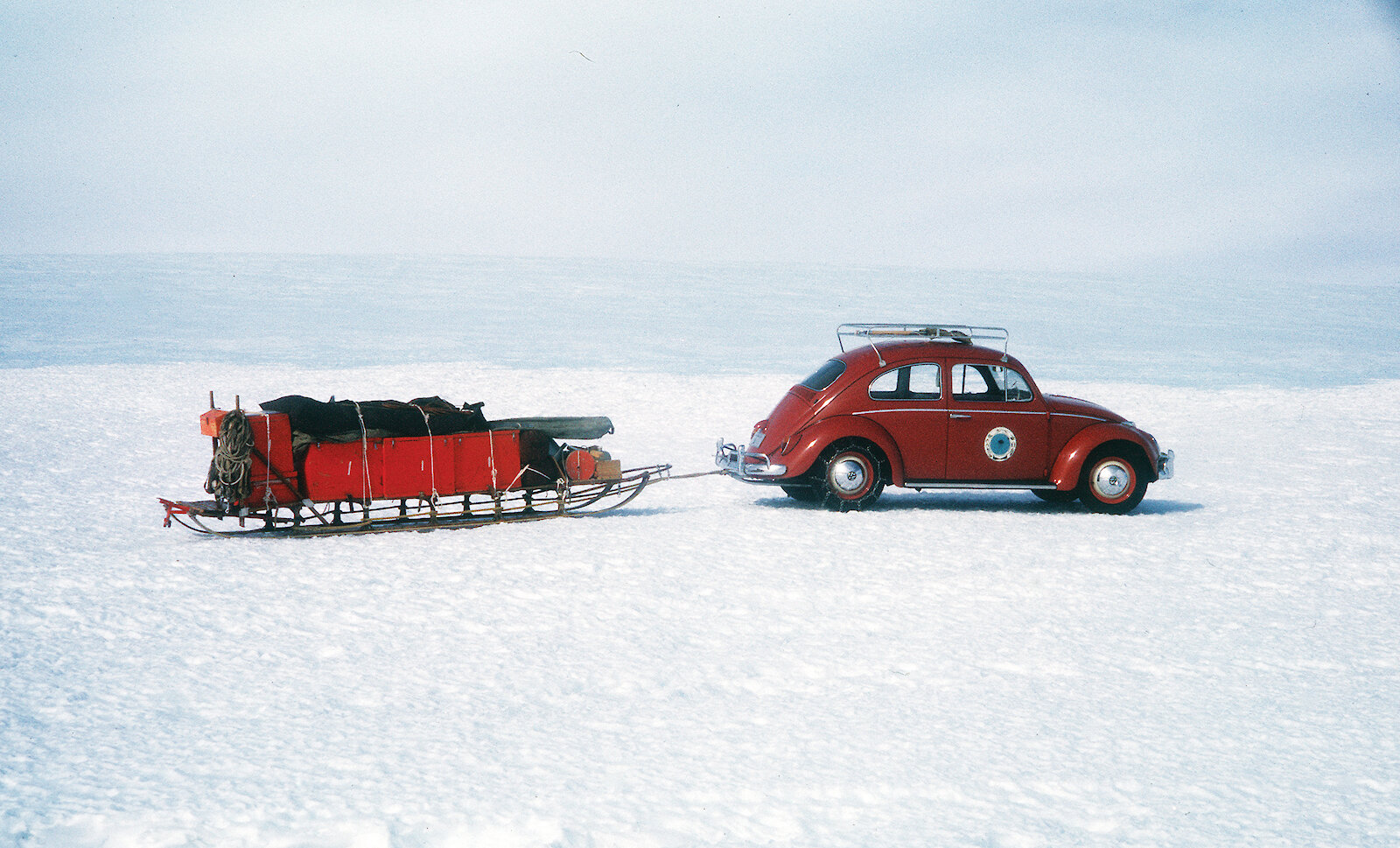
Antarctica 1 towing a sleigh in 1963

Mawson Station used classic Volkswagen Beetles, the first production cars to be utilized in Antarctica, from 1963 to 1970. The first of these was named the Antarctica 1.

In December 1997 into February 1998 two AT44, 4x4 cars (built in Iceland by Arctic Trucks with tire size of 44-inch tall) joined an expedition by the Swedish Polar Institution (SWEA). The cars got used to transport people and supplies from the Ice shelf to WASA station, to perform scanning of the snow and support a drilling expedition to on the Antarctica Plateau 76°S 8°03'W. This is the first time tire based vehicles successfully travel on the Antarctica high plateau.

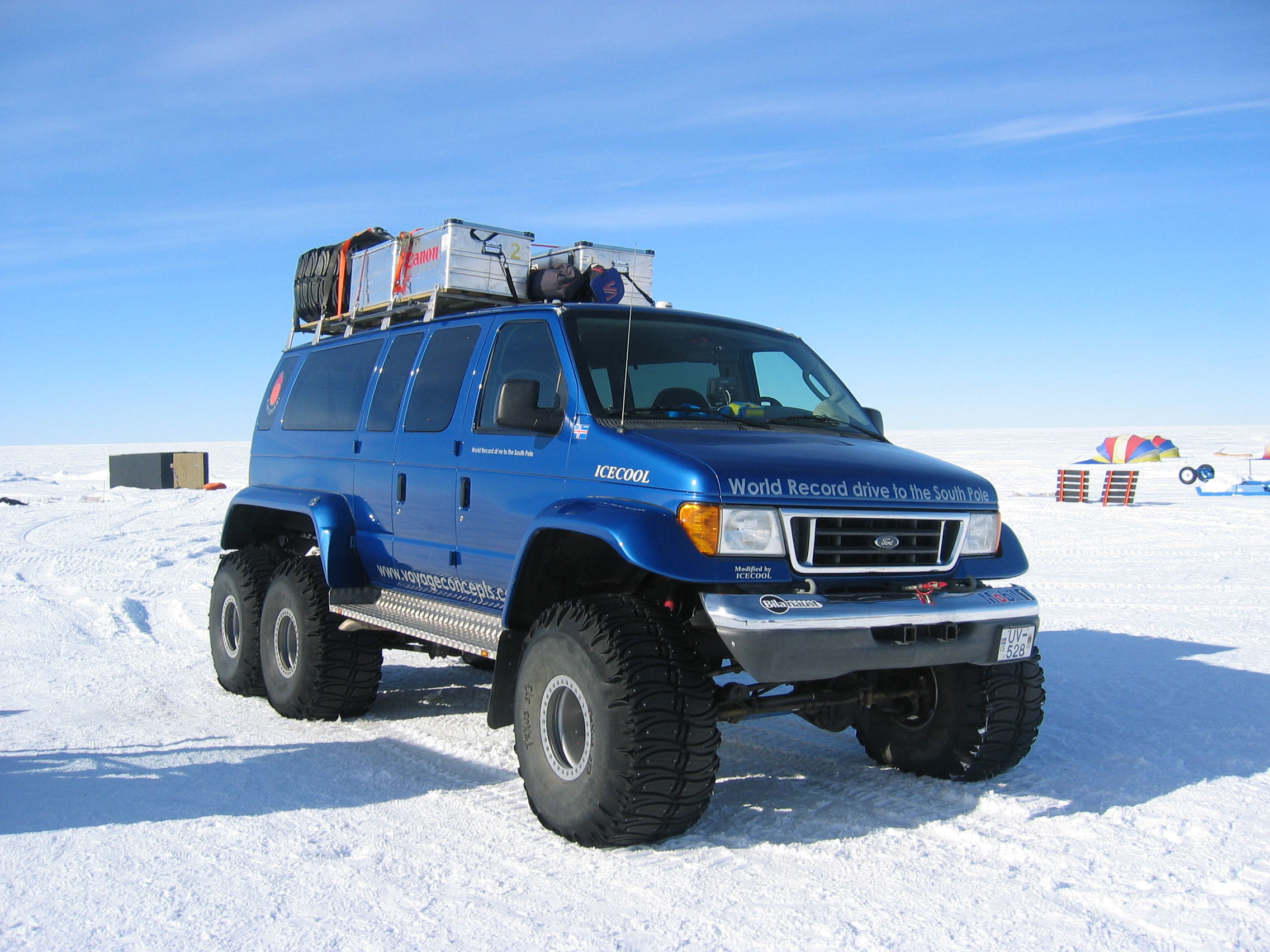
Ice Challenger vehicle at Patriot Hills, 2005

In 2005, a team of six people took part in the Ice Challenger Expedition. Travelling in a specially designed six wheel drive vehicle, the team completed the journey from the Antarctic coast at Patriot Hills to the geographic South Pole in 69 hours. In doing so they easily beat the previous record of 24 days. They arrived at the South Pole on December 12, 2005.

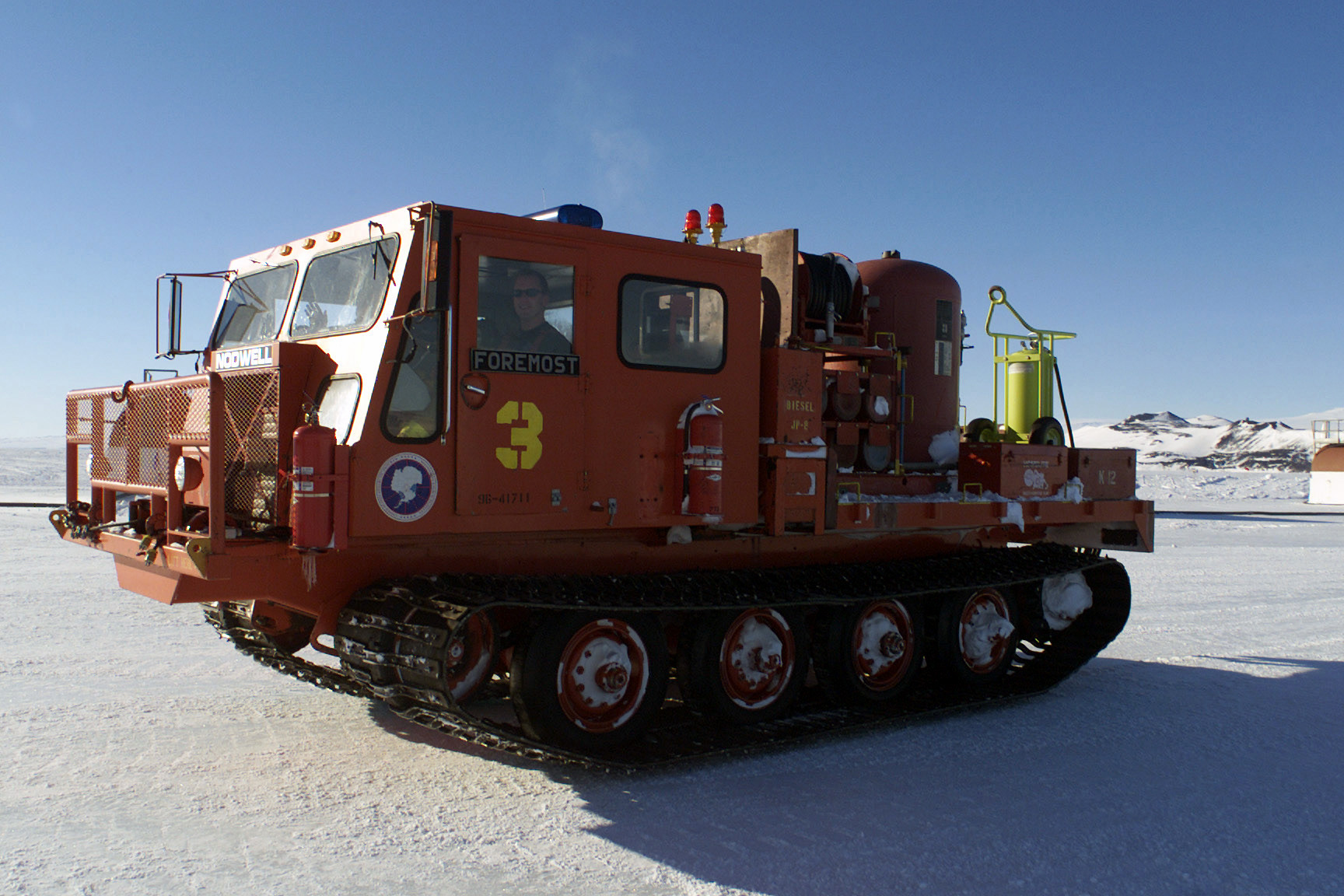
Foremost Nodwell 240 in Antarctica

The team members on that expedition were Andrew Regan, Jason De Carteret, Andrew Moon, Richard Griffiths, Gunnar Egilsson and Andrew Miles. The expedition successfully showed that wheeled transport on the continent is not only possible but also often more practical. The expedition also hoped to raise awareness about global warming and climate change.

From start of December 2008 into February 2009, four AT44, 4x4 cars were used to support a ski race by Amundsen Omega 3, from S82° 41' E17° 43' to South Pole. A film was made of this race by BBC called "On Thin Ice" with Ben Fogle and James Cracknell. The cars started from Novo airbase at S70° 49' E11° 38', establish a route onto the plateau through the crevasse areas in the Shcherbakov Mountain Range driving nearly 1,500 km (930 mi) to the start line of the ski race. For the return journey each car covered between 5,400 and 5,800 km (3,400 and 3,600 mi) with one fuel depot on the way.

From 2008 to date (Dec 2015) tire based cars, AT44 4x4 and AT44 6x6 have been used every season to support various NGO and scientific expedition/projects, supporting flights, fuel drops, filming, skiers, biker, a tractor, collecting snow samples and more. The combined distance covered on the Antarctica Plateau is over 220,000 km (140,000 mi) and even though towing capacity is much lower than for most belt based vehicles, the tire based cars multiply the travel speed and use only a fraction of the fuel making this an option for some expeditions/projects.

A second expedition led by Andrew Regan and Andrew Moon departed in November 2010. The Moon-Regan Trans Antarctic Expedition this time traversed the entire continent twice, using two six-wheel-drive vehicles and a Concept Ice Vehicle designed by Lotus. This time the team used the expedition to raise awareness about the global environmental importance of the Antarctic region and to show that biofuel can be a viable and environmentally friendly option.

== Water transport ==
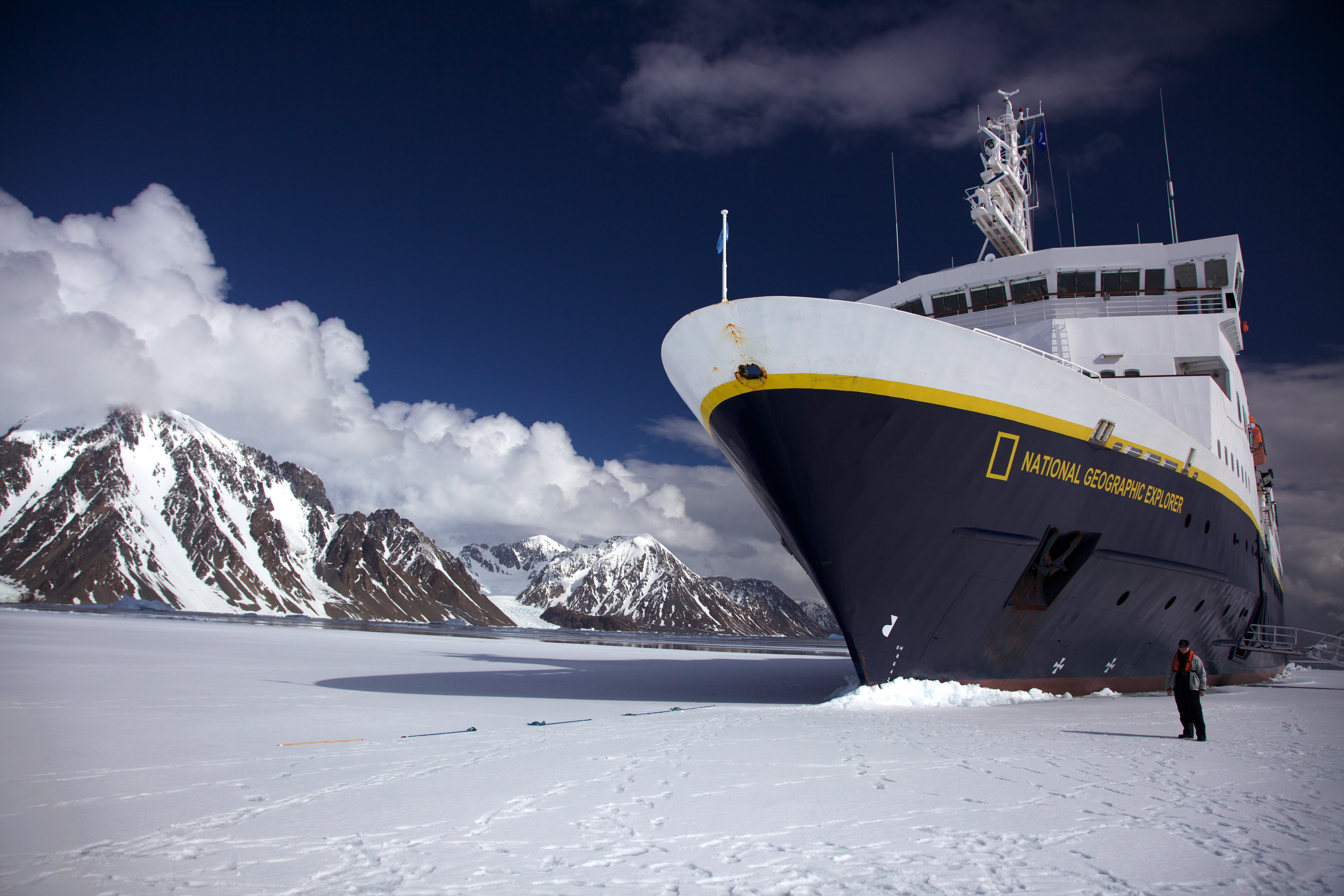
A tour boat in fast ice near the coast

Antarctica's only harbour is at McMurdo Station. Most coastal stations have offshore anchorages, and supplies are transferred from ship to shore by small boats, barges, and helicopters. A few stations have a basic wharf facility. All ships at port are subject to inspection in accordance with Article 7, Antarctic Treaty. Offshore anchorage is sparse and intermittent, but poses no problem to sailboats designed for the ice, typically with lifting keels and long shorelines. McMurdo Station (77°51′S 166°40′E), Palmer Station (64°43′S 64°03′W); government use only except by permit (see Permit Office under "Legal System"). A number of tour boats, ranging from large motorized vessels to small sailing yachts, visit the Antarctic Peninsula during the summer months (January–March). Most are based in Ushuaia, Argentina.

== Air transport ==
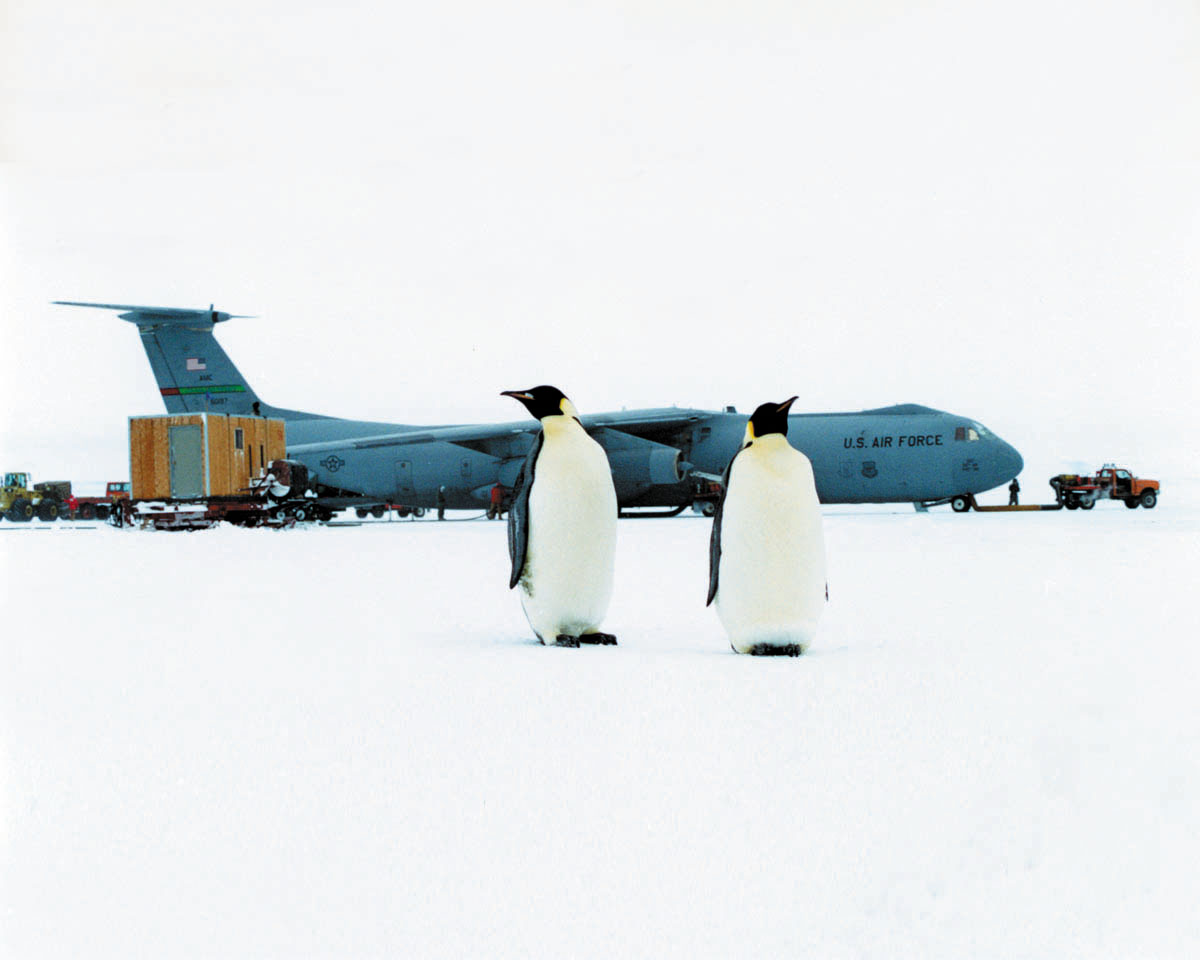
A US Air Force C-141 Starlifter participating in Operation Deep Freeze with penguins, 1997

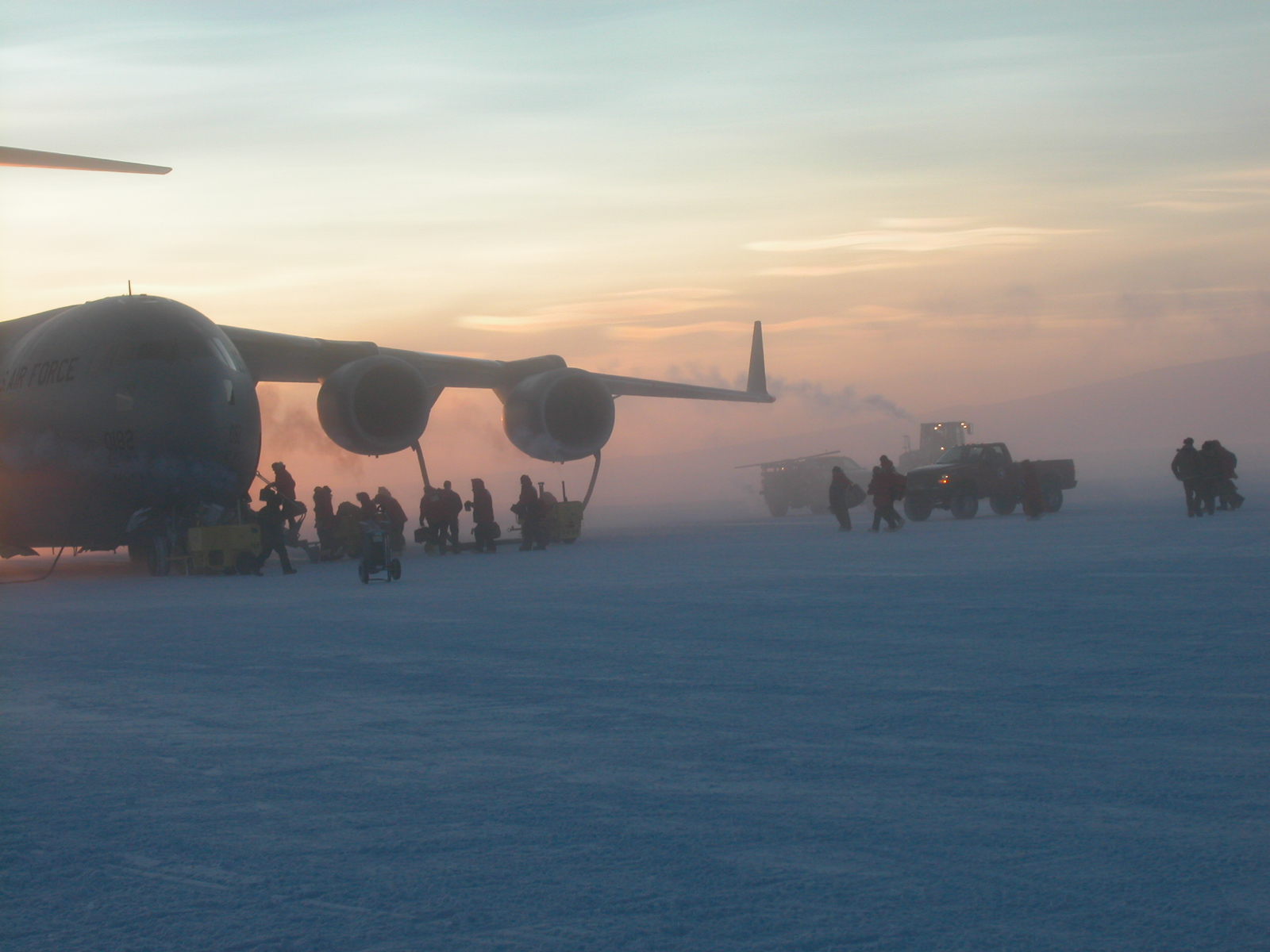
C-17 lands in Antarctica for WinFly 2003

Transport in Antarctica takes place by air, using fixed-wing aircraft and helicopters. Runways and helicopter pads have to be kept snow-free to ensure safe take off and landing conditions.

Antarctica has 20 airports, but there are no developed public-access airports or landing facilities. Thirty stations, operated by 16 national governments party to the Antarctic Treaty, have landing facilities for either helicopters and/or fixed-wing aircraft; commercial enterprises operate two additional air facilities.

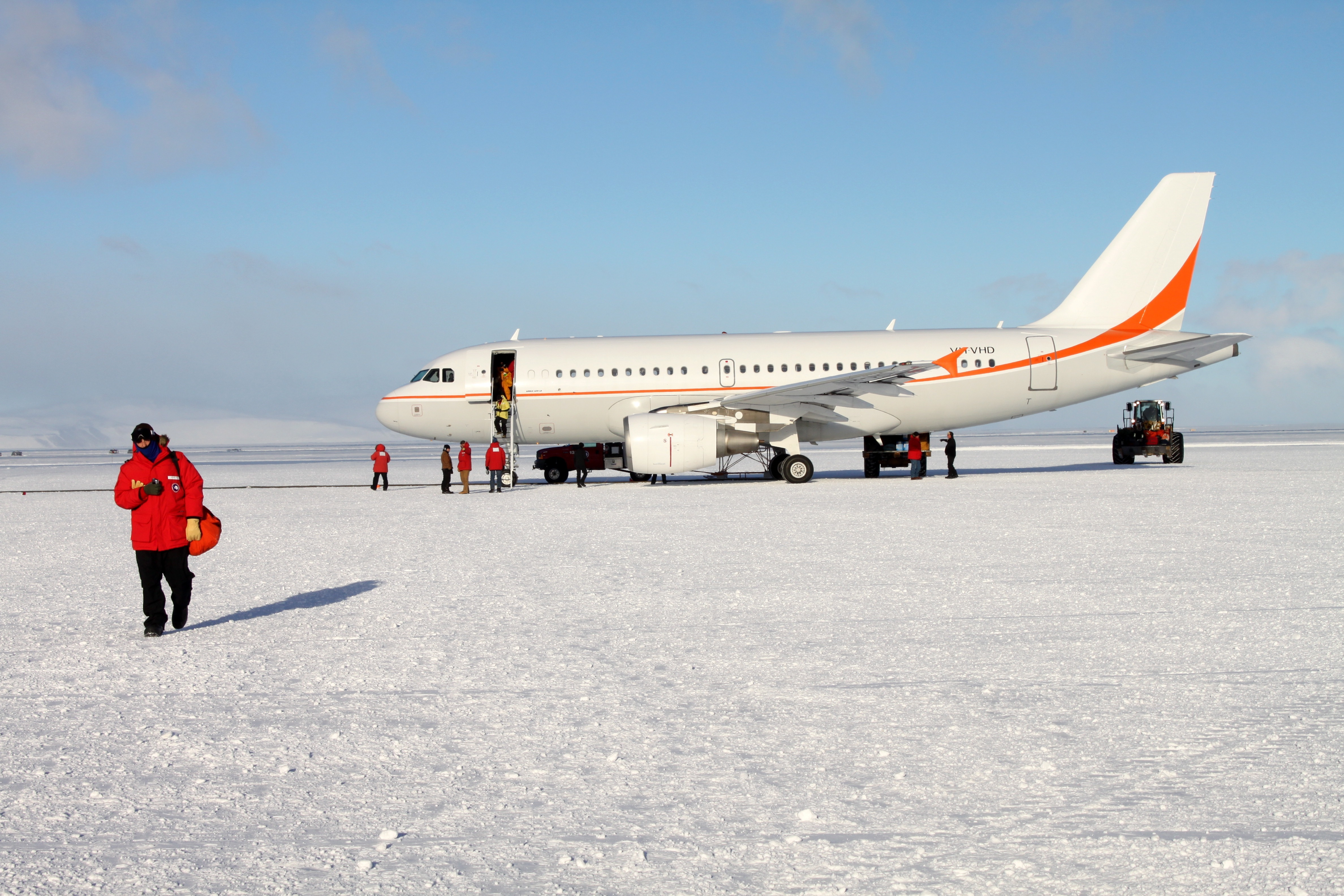
A319 lands in 2010

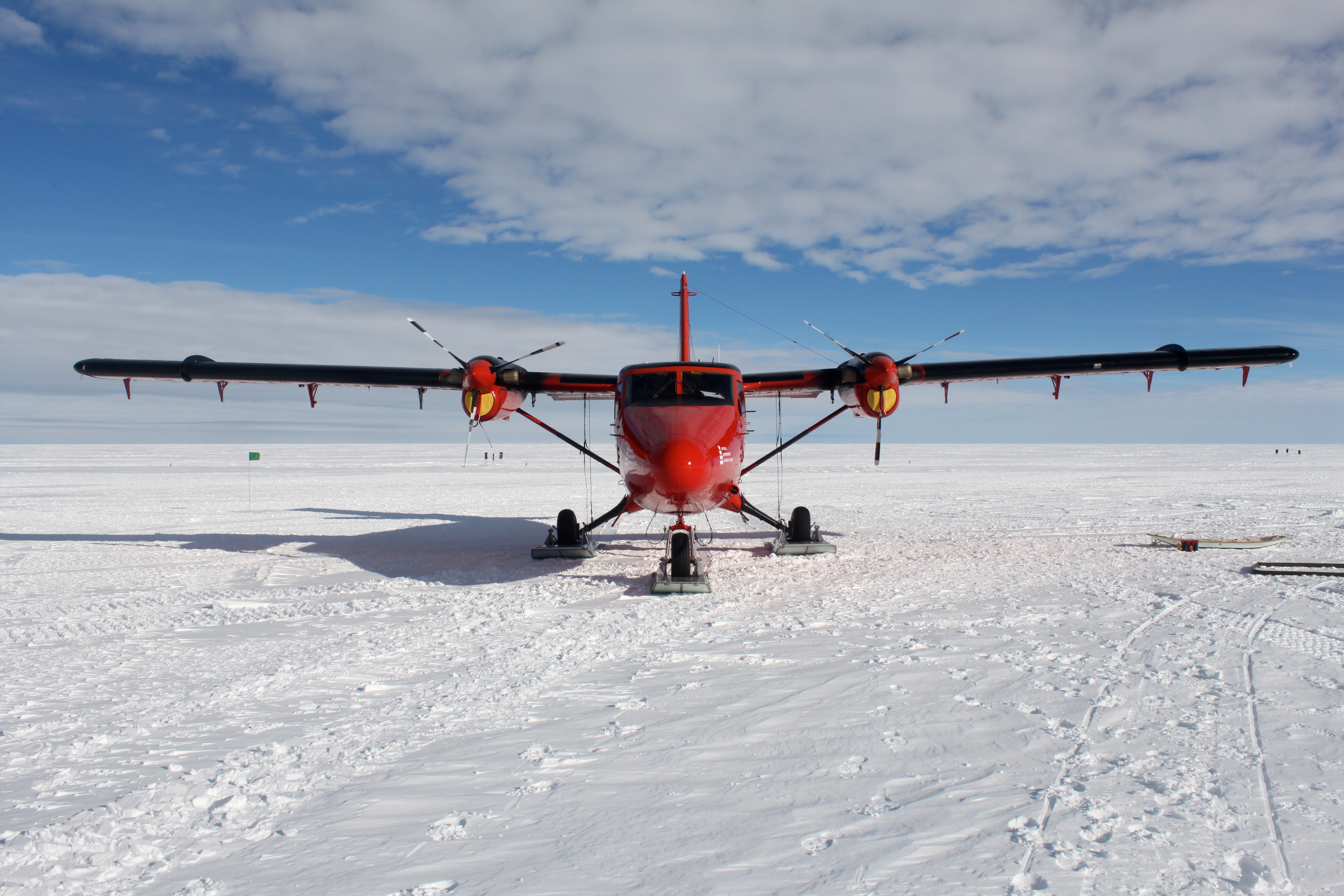
Twin Otter at the WAIS Divide field camp,2012

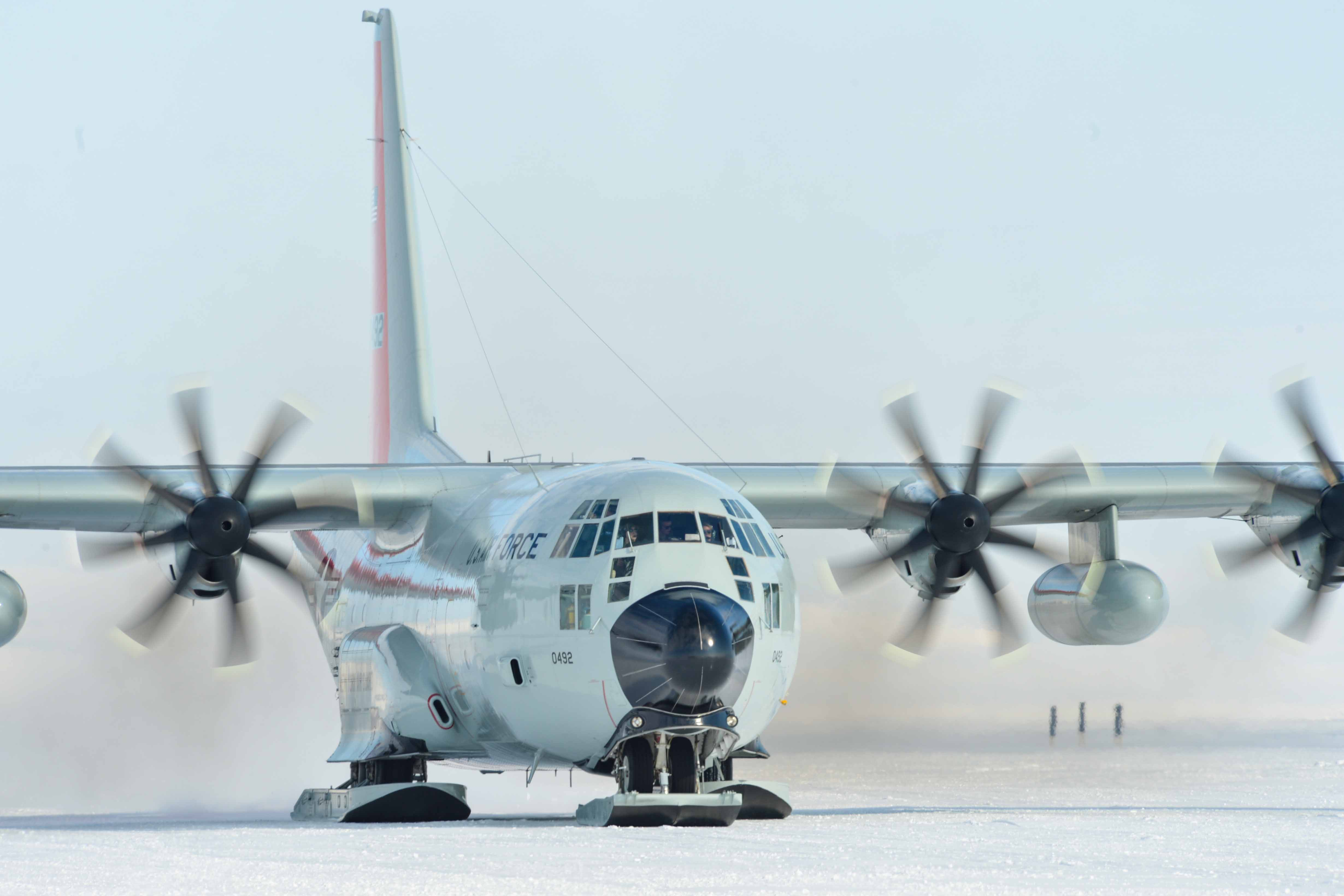
Ski-equipped Hercules taxis on snow runway, 2023

Helicopter pads are available at 27 stations; runways at 15 locations are gravel, sea-ice, blue-ice, or compacted snow suitable for landing wheeled, fixed-wing aircraft; of these, one is greater than 3 km (9,800 ft) in length, six are between 2 and 3 km (6,600 and 9,800 ft) in length, three are between 1 and 2 km (3,300 and 6,600 ft) in length, three are less than 1 km (3,300 ft) in length, and two are of unknown length; snow surface skiways, limited to use by ski-equipped, fixed-wing aircraft, are available at another 15 locations; of these, four are greater than 3 km in length, three are between 2 km and 3 km in length, two are between 1 km and 2 km in length, two are less than 1 km in length, and data is unavailable for the remaining four.

Antarctic airports are subject to severe restrictions and limitations resulting from extreme seasonal and geographic conditions; they do not meet ICAO standards, and advance approval from the respective governmental or nongovernmental operating organization is required for landing (1999 est.) Flights to the continent in the permanent darkness of the winter are normally only undertaken in an emergency, with burning barrels of fuel to outline a runway. On September 11, 2008, a United States Air Force C-17 Globemaster III successfully completed the first landing in Antarctica using night-vision goggles at Pegasus Field.

In April 2001 an emergency evacuation of Dr. Ronald Shemenski was needed from Amundsen–Scott South Pole Station when he contracted pancreatitis. Three C-130 Hercules were called back before their final leg because of weather. Organizers then called on Kenn Borek Air based in Calgary, Alberta. Two de Havilland Twin Otters were dispatched out of Calgary with one being back-up. Twin Otters are specifically designed for the Canadian north and Kenn Borek Air's motto is "Anywhere, Anytime, World-Wide". The mission was a success but not without difficulties and drawbacks. Ground crews needed to create a 2 km (6,600 ft) runway with tracked equipment not designed to operate in the low temperatures at that time of year, the aircraft controls had to be "jerry-rigged" when the flaps were frozen in position after landing, and instruments were not reliable because of the cold. When they saw a "faint pink line on the horizon" they knew they were going in the right direction. This was the first rescue from the South Pole during winter. Canada honoured the Otter crew for bravery.

In 2021, an Airbus A340 aeroplane operated by Portuguese charter airline Hi Fly landed in Antarctica for the first time.

== See also ==
- Tourism in Antarctica
- List of airports in Antarctica
- Bibliography of Antarctica
- WinFly
