= Andrew Regan =

British-born polar explorer and entrepreneur

- Born: 14 December 1965 (age 60); Manchester, England, UK
- Occupation: Entrepreneur
- Employer: Corvus Capital
- Title: Chief Executive Officer
- Children: Eight

Andrew Regan (born 14 December 1965, in Manchester, England) is a British-born polar explorer and entrepreneur. He is the chief executive officer and sole shareholder of Corvus Capital, an investment company.

== Career ==
=== Hobson ===
Early in his career, Regan ran a household products business, Cadismark, which was sold to Hobson plc in 1991. Following the sale, he became the chief executive of Hobson, which was listed on the London Stock Exchange. In 1994, Hobson acquired F.E. Barber, the food and drinks manufacturing operation of the Co-operative Wholesale Society.

Regan was responsible for developing the Loyd Grossman range of sauces which were manufactured by F.E. Barber. After rationalising the operation, Hobson was acquired in 1996 by Hillsdown Holdings for £154 million, through a recommended cash takeover.

=== Co-operative Wholesale Society (CWS) ===
In 1997 Regan led an attempt to gain control of the CWS in a £1.2 billion take-over bid which was rejected. As part of its bid defence, the CWS carried out an investigation into former dealings between certain CWS executives and Regan. In 1995 Regan had authorised the transfer of £2.4 m from F.E. Barber which he maintained he provided to an intermediary as a brokerage fee for successfully resolving the deadlock between the CWS and Hobson in negotiations about extending a food supply contract; the Serious Fraud Office (SFO) maintained that the transfer was used by the intermediary to provide a bribe to two senior CWS executives in order to extend the contract.

Regan's first trial resulted, in 2002, in a hung jury and a retrial was ordered. This retrial in 2003, ended when a juror alleged he was approached by an unknown party. At the second retrial (also in 2003), Regan was acquitted with the judge noting that he was minded to order the SFO to pay Regan's defence costs. In 2005, the Co-operative Group (successor to the CWS) received what it described as a "substantial payment" as part of an out-of-court settlement with Regan and others in a civil case relating to the accusations.

=== ASOS plc ===
Regan was the original financier behind the online fashion retailer ASOS plc, which is now the UK's largest independent online fashion retailer. He invested £2.3 million in seed capital at the company’s inception and was described as the “creative arm” of the business during its formative period. As Seen on Screen, as it was then known at listing, was reversed into Brindle Limited, a shell company created by a consortium of fellow Monaco investors that included Nigel Robertson. The AIM listing raised only £255,000 (£95,000 after expenses) and had a market capitalisation of £12m when listed on the AIM Market in 2001, growing to £4.36bn in 2017.

=== Corvus Capital ===
Regan became the chief executive officer and sole shareholder of Corvus Capital, an international investment company, in 2004 - a position he still assumes. Corvus was established to identify assets or companies which are either underperforming or undervalued. The management team attempt to acquire or tactically reposition such companies in order to realise potential value. Corvus Capital, Inc. was listed in the UK on the London Stock Exchange's Alternative Investment Market (AIM) before it was taken private in December 2008.

Corvus founded Lodore Resources, an AIM-listed investment company formed in 2004 with the intention to build a group specialising in the oil and gas sector. The company listed with a market capitalisation of £6.4 million, and after building a group with its assets principally in the United States. In 2005 the company was acquired for a total consideration of £115.0 million. Other Corvus investments included, amongst others, Commoditrade and Gable Holdings.

Regan has been involved in several start-up companies including Imperial Energy, an upstream oil and gas exploration and production company focused on the Commonwealth of Independent States and, in particular, the Russian Federation. The company was floated on AIM in 2004 at 25p per share and moved to the Official List in 2007. In 2008, Imperial was acquired by ONGC Videsh of India for £1.3 billion (1,125 pence per share).

=== Sarborg ===
In September 2026, Regan was appointed chief executive officer of Sarborg Limited, a quantum computing and agentic AI signature intelligence business. Sarborg uses AI agents to analyse biological and chemical signatures, which it treats as a common data language for identifying opportunities across industries. Originally focused on evaluating pharmaceutical assets, the company has expanded into agriculture, animal health and bacteria, and in June 2026 launched SarborgQ, a division applying quantum computing to its signature analysis. In November 2026, Sarborg shares were acquired at $125,000 per share, a price that values the company's ordinary shares in issue at approximately $709 million. In November 2026, Corvus Capital acquired a further 1,182 ordinary shares in Sarborg, taking its holding to 43.5% of the shares in issue.

=== Academia ===
In 2014, Regan was awarded a PhD from Oxford Brookes University's Faculty of Technology, Design and Environment. His thesis was "A system to predict the S&P 500 using a bio-inspired algorithm."

== Polar travel ==
=== North Pole ===
Regan visited the Geographic North Pole for the first time in 2004. In April 2008 he returned, completing an expedition on foot with three of his children to raise awareness about climate change. His latest visit was in 2014, taking the total number of times he has reached the pole to three.

=== Ice Challenger 05 ===
In 2005, he led the Ice Challenger Expedition, a world record attempt for the fastest overland crossing to the South Pole. The six-man Ice Challenger team completed the 1,200 km route in 69 hours, breaking the previous world record of 24 days (576 hours). The expedition aimed to increase awareness of global warming. The entire team wanted to highlight the impact of climate change on the Antarctic, to the rest of the world.

=== Moon-Regan TransAntarctic Expedition ===
Regan returned to Antarctica in November 2010, leading the Moon Regan TransAntarctic Expedition. The 10-man expedition team completed the first ever there-and-back crossing of Antarctica, a journey of some 4,000 km, in 23 days. They travelled from Patriot Hills on the west coast to the South Pole, heading north from there through the Trans-Antarctic Mountains, down the Leverett Glacier and off the coastline onto the Ross Ice Shelf.

Winston Wong, a prominent Taiwanese businessman and alumnus of Imperial College London, was the main sponsor to the expedition. The Winston Wong Bio-Inspired Ice Vehicle was the lead vehicle in the expedition and was the first ever bio-fuelled vehicle to reach the Geographic South Pole. The WWBIV is currently on display at the Magic School for Green Technology at the National Cheng Kung University in Tainen.

The expedition partnered with Imperial College London, to carry out scientific experiments in Antarctica.

== Personal life ==
Regan was born in Manchester and has eight children.
