= John Huston (polar explorer) =

American polar explorer (born 1976)

John Huston (born August 14, 1976) is an American polar explorer, motivational speaker, wilderness guide, and safety and logistics consultant. In 2009, Huston completed the first successful unsupported American expedition to the North Pole. He has also completed expeditions to the South Pole, Greenland, and Ellesmere Island. Huston is the co-author of Forward: The First American Unsupported Expedition to the North Pole.

== Biography ==
Huston started his career in Minnesota’s Boundary Waters. From 2000 to 2005, Huston worked full-time at Outward Bound, an expedition school that leads active learning trips. In the spring of 2005, Huston was the only North American selected to join a team of Norwegians restaging Roald Amundsen’s 1911 expedition to the South Pole for a History Channel and BBC documentary. The expedition team skied and dog sledded 1400 miles over 72 days on the Greenland icecap, using 1911 period clothing, equipment and food. During December 2007 and January 2008, Huston led a full-length ski expedition to the South Pole, covering 720 miles in 57 days.

In April 2009, Huston and his expedition partner, Tyler Fish, traveled unsupported from land to the North Pole. In doing so, they became the first North Americans to complete this trip. Th 55-day, 475-mile journey had been accomplished by 13 prior expeditions and is considered the toughest expedition on the planet by many in the polar exploration industry. Huston highlights themes of this expedition in his motivational lectures.

In March 2013, Huston (United States), Tobias Thorleifsson (Norway), Hugh Dale-Harris (Canada), and Kyle O’Donoghue (South Africa), an expedition filmmaker, completed a 630-mile expedition on Ellesmere Island in the Canadian High Arctic. The team filmed their expedition for the documentary New Land 2013.

Recently, Huston has worked as a guide in polar base camps, where he has assisted film crews and scientists operating in temperatures down to -57 °F (-50 °C). Huston currently consults with other polar expeditions to run logistics, safety and communications for teams on the ice. He also advises and serves as a safety auditor for educational outdoor programs like Project Wildcat, a backpacking program that Huston co-founded in 1996 for incoming students at Northwestern University.

=== Personal life ===
Huston trains daily. He spends his downtime cooking, reading, and traveling. He lives in on the shores of Lake Michigan in Evanston, Illinois with his wife.

=== Degrees ===
Bachelor of Arts in History, Anthropology, and Geography from Northwestern University in Evanston, Illinois

== Expeditions ==
=== New Land – Ellesmere Island, Canada (2013) ===
Huston and his teammates, Tobias Thorleifsson, Hugh Dale-Harris, and Kyle O’Donoghue, retraced portions of Norwegian explorer Otto Sverdrup’s 2nd Fram expedition on Ellesmere Island. They made the documentary film Mystery of the Arctic Cairn about their journey. The team skijored over 600 miles in 65 days.

=== Victorinox North Pole Expedition (2009) ===
Huston completed the first American unsupported expedition to the North Pole with Tyler Fish. They finished 478 miles in 55 days with no resupplies.

=== NorthWinds Vision South Pole Expedition (2007-2008) ===
Huston lead this 720-mile ski expedition to the South Pole in 57 days, with resupplies.

=== Global Warming 101 Expedition – Baffin Island, Canada (2007) ===
Huston worked as the on-site expedition manager for this Will Steger-led team. This 100-day dogsled expedition linked Inuit villages to schools in the U.S. and Canada.

=== The Modern Amundsen Expedition – Greenland (2005) ===
Huston worked as a dog musher on a team of Norwegian explorers to re-stage Roald Amundsen's race to the South Pole for a BBC and History Channel documentary film project. Rune Gjeldnes led the expedition team of Harald Kippenes, Ketil Reitan, and Inge Soleheim. The team spent 72 days traveling 1,400 miles by dogsled and cross country ski, using only 1911-style food, clothing and equipment.

== Guiding ==
John has been guiding since 1996. He has led major polar expeditions and guided television crews on the Arctic Ocean. Previous work includes: Northwinds Polar Training with the Canadian Special Operations Forces Command in Iqaluit, Nunavut, Canada; Catlin Arctic Survey with CNN, British Channel 4, and Al Jazeera English at the Arctic Ocean Scientific Base Camp; Northwinds Vision South Pole Expedition; Voyageur Outward Bound School; and Project Wildcat at Northwestern University.

== Awards and honors ==
2013: Minnesota Book Awards Finalist

2012: IBPA Benjamin Franklin Award, Sports and Recreation Book of the Year
