= ONGC Tripura Power Company =

Thermal power plant in Palatana, Tripura, India

Palatana Power Plant
- Official name: ONGC Tripura Power Company Limited (OTPC)
- Country: India
- Location: Palatana, Udaipur, Tripura
- Coordinates: 23°30′00″N 91°26′18″E
- Construction began: October 2005
- Commission date: June 2013
- Owners: Oil and Natural Gas Corporation, Ministry of Petroleum and Natural Gas, Government of India

Power generation
- Units operational: 1 × 363.3 MW (as of 16 January 2014)
- Units planned: 726.6 MW
- Units under const.: 1 × 363.3 MW
- Nameplate capacity: 726.6 MW

External links
- Website: www.otpcindia.in

ONGC Tripura Power Company Limited (OTPC) also known as Palatana Power Plant, is a thermal power plant station in Palatana, Udaipur in the Gomoti district of the northeastern Indian state of Tripura. It is a division of Oil and Natural Gas Corporation which is under the ownership of Ministry of Petroleum and Natural Gas, Government of India. It is the first government owned-power plant in India and it is also known as the biggest Plant in Northeast India.

== Capacity ==
726.6 MW Combined Cycle Gas Turbine (CCGT) power plant at Palatana, Tripura, based on ONGC's domestic gas supply. The project is in advanced stage of implementation. EPC contract of about Rs. 2200 crores has already been awarded to BHEL on 11 August 2008. The Generation Project is being domiciled in ONGC Tripura Power Company Ltd. ("OTPC" or "the Company"), a Special Purpose Vehicle promoted by ONGC, IL&FS Limited and Government of Tripura (GoT).

Stage	Unit number	Capacity (MW)	Date of commissioning
1st	1	363.3	2013 January
1st	2	363.3	2014 November

== Transmission project ==
A 400 kV D/C Transmission system connecting Palatana (generation project site) in Tripura to Bongaigaon in Assam over a distance of around 650 km for the evacuation of power from the generation project.

The development and operation of the transmission system would be undertaken by North-East Transmission Company Limited (NETCL) a joint venture of OTPC, Power Grid Corporation of India Ltd (PGCIL) and the North Eastern Region beneficiary states. OTPC has been granted in-principle approval for Mega Power Project (MPP) status by GoI on 27 July 2006 for the Project. The company is applying to MoP, GoI for final approval of MPP status and the same is expected to be obtained shortly. For evacuating Power from the gas based 726.6 MW power Project Generators, a trunk transmission line is being developed by another Special Purpose Vehicle (SPV), jointly promoted by Power Grid Corporation Ltd., OTPC and the North Eastern Region (NER) states. Inter-state and intrastate sub-transmission system and the distribution system within NER states shall be developed by Power Grid Corporation as the Central Transmission Utility (CTU) The Transmission Project was initially envisaged to be domiciled in a separate SPV, North-East Power Transmission Company Limited ("NEPTC") and developed through a BOOT operator. However given the criticality of timely completion of the Transmission System to the operations of the Generation Plant, a decision was taken to develop the transmission system as a component of the composite Project within OTPC. Subsequently, the process of merging NEPTC with OTPC was initiated; The petition for amalgamation of NEPTC with OTPC was approved by the Hon'ble Guwahati High Court in Sept 2007. Subsequently, in late 2007, in consultation with the Ministry of Power (MoP), it was decided that the integrated project be developed as a regional project. The power allocation from the project was revised and about 640 MW was allocated to the NER beneficiary states and the balance 100 MW was to be retained by OTPC for merchant/short-term sale (based on assumed capacity of 740 MW). Pursuant to this development, the Transmission project was again carved out for development through a separate SPV. Accordingly, the Transmission JV was again incorporate as "North East Transmission Company Ltd"(NETC). The transmission project is progressing smoothly with the process of award of transmission tower construction packages for completion in tandem with the commissioning of the Generation Project.

== Gas reserves ==
However, these natural gas reserves are yet to be commercially developed due to low industrial demand in the North-Eastern region. The complexities of logistics and attendant costs limit the economic viability of transportation of gas to other parts of the country where gas is in deficit. In order to optimally utilize the gas available in Tripura, ONGC proposes to initially develop a 726.6 MW Combined Cycle Gas Turbine (CCGT) thermal power plant ("the Project") close to its gas fields in the state of Tripura and supply power to the deficit areas of North Eastern States of India.

== Allocation of power ==
660 km long transmission line from the plant to Burnihat in Meghalaya through Silchar in Assam was completed by which power from the first unit could be catered to other states of the north-east. But the work for the 400 kV double circuit high tension line up to Bongaigaon from Burnihat is pending due to forest clearance. The Following are the distribution of electricity to the different Northeastern States of India from the OTPC.

Beneficiary	Power(MW)
Arunachal Pradesh	22 MW
Assam	240 MW
Manipur	42 MW
Meghalaya	79 MW
Mizoram	22 MW
Nagaland	27 MW
Tripura	196 MW
Total	628 MW

OTPC will be selling the remaining 98 MW electricity.
