= Mumbai High Field =

Oilfield in India

Mumbai High
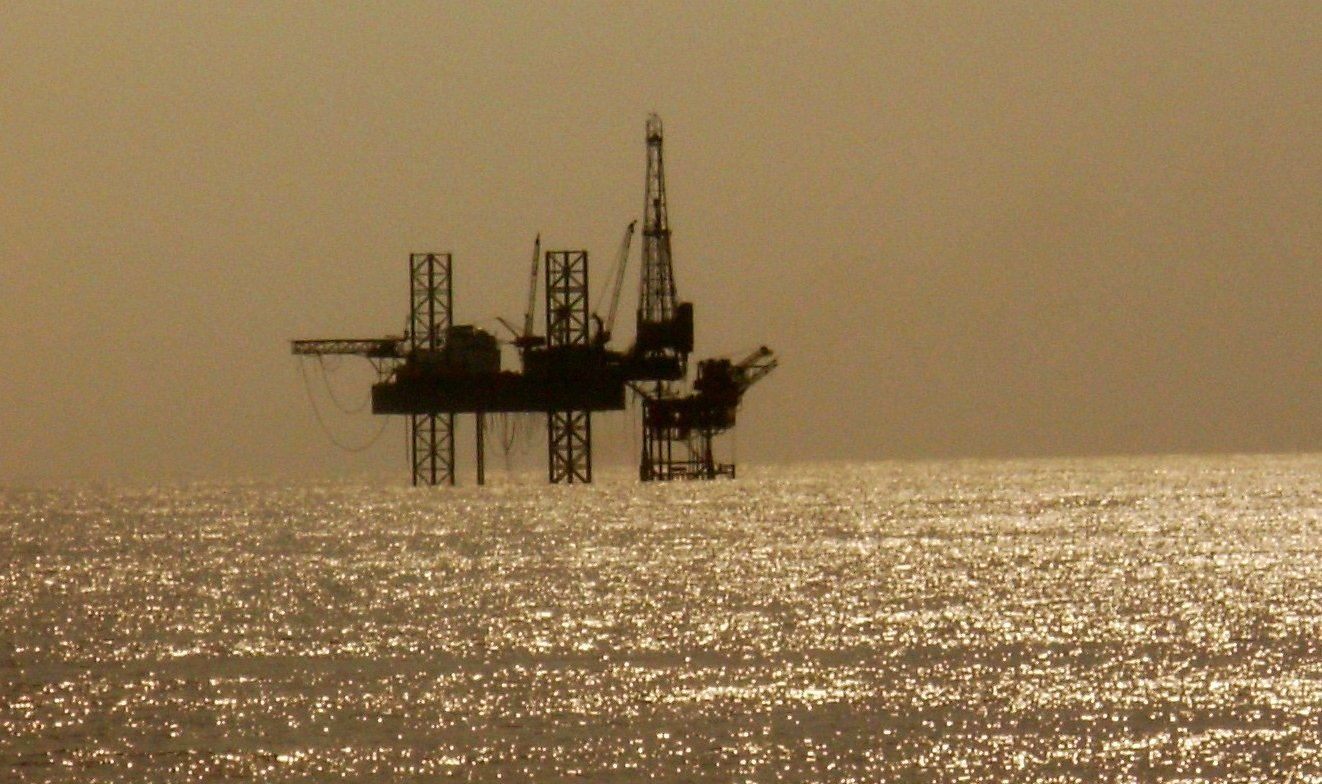
- Oil Rig at Mumbai High

- Location within India
- Country: India
- Region: Gulf of Khambhat
- Location: off the coast of Mumbai
- Offshore/onshore: Offshore
- Coordinates: 19.41667°N 71.33333°E
- Operator: ONGC

Field history
- Discovery: 1974
- Start of production: 1976
- Peak year: 1989

Production
- Current production of oil: 126,000 barrels per day (~6.28×10^{6} t/a)
- Year of current production of oil: 2026
- Current production of gas: 10×10^{6} m^{3}/d (350×10^{6} cu ft/d)
- Year of current production of gas: 2024
- Peak of production (oil): 471,000 barrels per day (~2.35×10^{7} t/a)

The Mumbai High Field, formerly called the Bombay High Field, is an offshore oilfield 160 km (99 mi) off the west coast of Mumbai, in Gulf of Cambay (now Khambhat) region of India, in about 75 m (246 ft) of water. The oil operations are run by India's Oil and Natural Gas Corporation (ONGC).

Mumbai High field was discovered by an Indo-Soviet oil exploration team operating from the seismic exploration vessel Academic Arkhangelsky during mapping of the Gulf of Khambhat (earlier Cambay) in 1964–67, followed by a detailed survey in 1972. The naming of the field is attributed to a team from a survey run in 1965 analysed in the Rashmi building in Peddar Road, Cumballa Hill, Mumbai. The first offshore well was sunk in 1974.

Every oil resource rock requires Structural traps which are mainly salt dome, coral reefs, fault trap and fold trap. In case of Mumbai High, the structure is a "north-northwest to south-southeast trending doubly plunging Anticline with a faulted east limb", 65 km long and 23 km wide", and is the most probable reason to call it "Mumbai High".

== Geology ==
This is a carbonate reservoir, the main producing zone, L-III, consisting of sedimentary cycles of lagoonal, algal mound, foraminiferal mound and then coastal marsh, capped by a post-middle Miocene shale. Mumbai High has three blocks separated by east–west trending faults, all three with different gas-oil contacts but approximately 1,355 m (4,446 ft) deep.

== Production ==
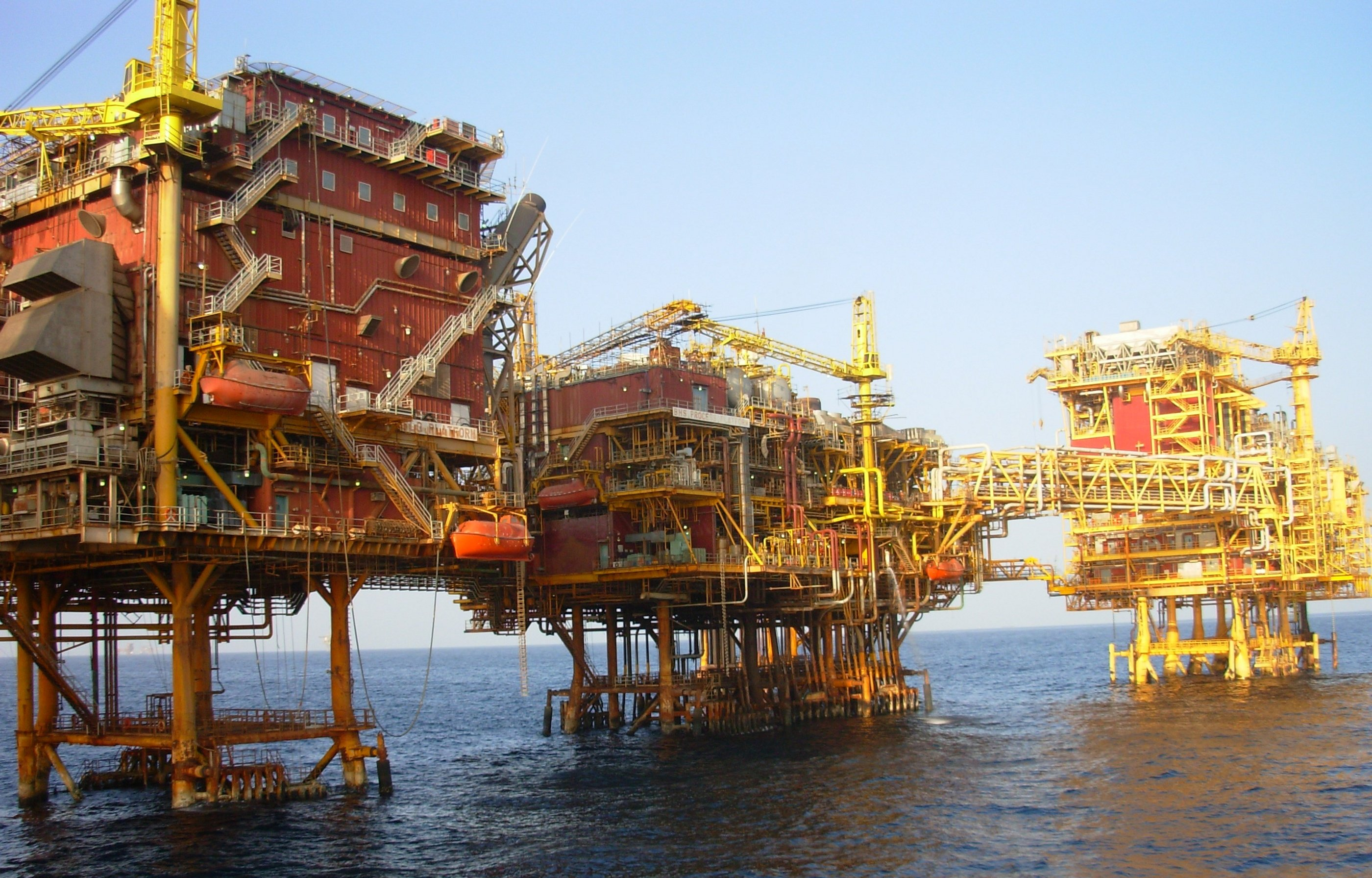
ONGC platform at Mumbai High in the Arabian Sea

Mumbai High Field reached its peak production level of 20 million tonnes per year in 1998.

As of 2004, it supplied 14% of India's oil requirement and accounted for about 38% of all domestic production.

ONGC approved construction of seven pipelines with risers and associated top-side facilities in MHN in April 2007. These pipelines are vital for optimum utilisation from Mumbai High.

Crude oil produced from Mumbai High is considered to be of very good quality as compared to crudes produced in middle east. Mumbai High crude has more than 60% paraffinic content while light Arabian crude has only 25% paraffin.

In November 2009, output of Mumbai High fields, that accounted for half of the India's domestic oil production, fell 5.3% to 347,197 barrels per day (55,199.9 m^{3}/d).

On 1 January 2018 the output of the field was stated as 205,000 barrels per day (32,600 m^{3}/d).

In 2020 the output of the field was 170,000 barrels per day (27,000 m^{3}/d) and the output of the Bassein field was 60,000 barrels per day (9,500 m^{3}/d). ONGC temporarily suspended operations at two drilling rigs in the Mumbai High and Bassein fields after 54 employees tested positive for coronavirus and one died but the oil and gas production was not impacted.

As of 2020 Mumbai High and Bassein were India's top oil and gas producing fields, accounting for almost two-third of the country's production.

The field produces 134,000 barrels per day (21,300 m^{3}/d) in 2024. ONGC believes the field still has a balance reserve of 80 million tonnes (610 million barrels) of oil and over 40 bcm of gas and hence, needs partners who can help tap them.

In 2025, BP was appointed specifically to act as the Technical Services Provider (TSP). BP's primary role is to advise, deploy expert personnel, and implement technical solutions to boost efficiency.Within the first year of the technical partnership, the collaboration successfully stabilized the baseline and added an initial 3,500 to 4,000 barrels per day (bpd) of crude, bringing total output to roughly 126,000 bpd in 2026.

== 2005 major accident ==
On 27 July 2005, a major fire destroyed the production platform, leaving at least 22 people dead despite rescue measures taken by the Indian Coast Guard. The platform accounted for 110,000 barrels per day (17,000 m^{3}/d), or 15% of India's oil production. Rebuilding this was expected to take upwards of 4 months and estimated to cost around ₹1,200 crore or US$300 million.
