= Concept Ice Vehicle =

The Concept Ice Vehicle or CIV was a bio-fuelled, propeller-powered vehicle that was developed for the Andrew Regan / Andrew Moon bid to cross the Antarctic in 2009. The Expedition was rescheduled to November 2010 and the Ice Vehicle was re-engineered and renamed the Winston Wong Bio-Inspired Ice Vehicle BIV. Professor Winston Wong is the sponsor of the Moon Regan Transantarctic Expedition 2010. The Expedition has several key objectives: to show that the right motorised vehicles can operate successfully and efficiently in the Antarctic, to successfully complete a transantarctic crossing and to help researchers at Imperial College London gather useful data on vehicle emissions, the performance of biofuels and human performance under extreme conditions. Few ground vehicles have, to date, been successful there; researchers who work across the continent tend to rely on air travel, which may be more environmentally damaging.

== Development ==
The CIV was originally designed and engineered by Kieron Bradley - chassis designer for the Lotus Formula One team. Later changes and modifications were undertaken by the Expedition team and engineers at Imperial College London.

== Specifications ==
- Suspension: all-round independent suspension to cope with rough terrain and sastrugi
- Engine: R259 oilhead BMW motorcycle engine, running on E85 bio-ethanol
- Dimensions: 4.5m long x 4.5m wide
- Weight: 690 kg
- Top speed: 84 mph

== Testing ==
The CIV underwent pre-expedition testing in Sweden in March 2009.

== See also ==
- Imperial Trans-Antarctic Expedition of 1914-1917
- Commonwealth Trans-Antarctic Expedition of 1955-1958
