= Eva Carneiro =

Gibraltar-born British sports medicine specialist

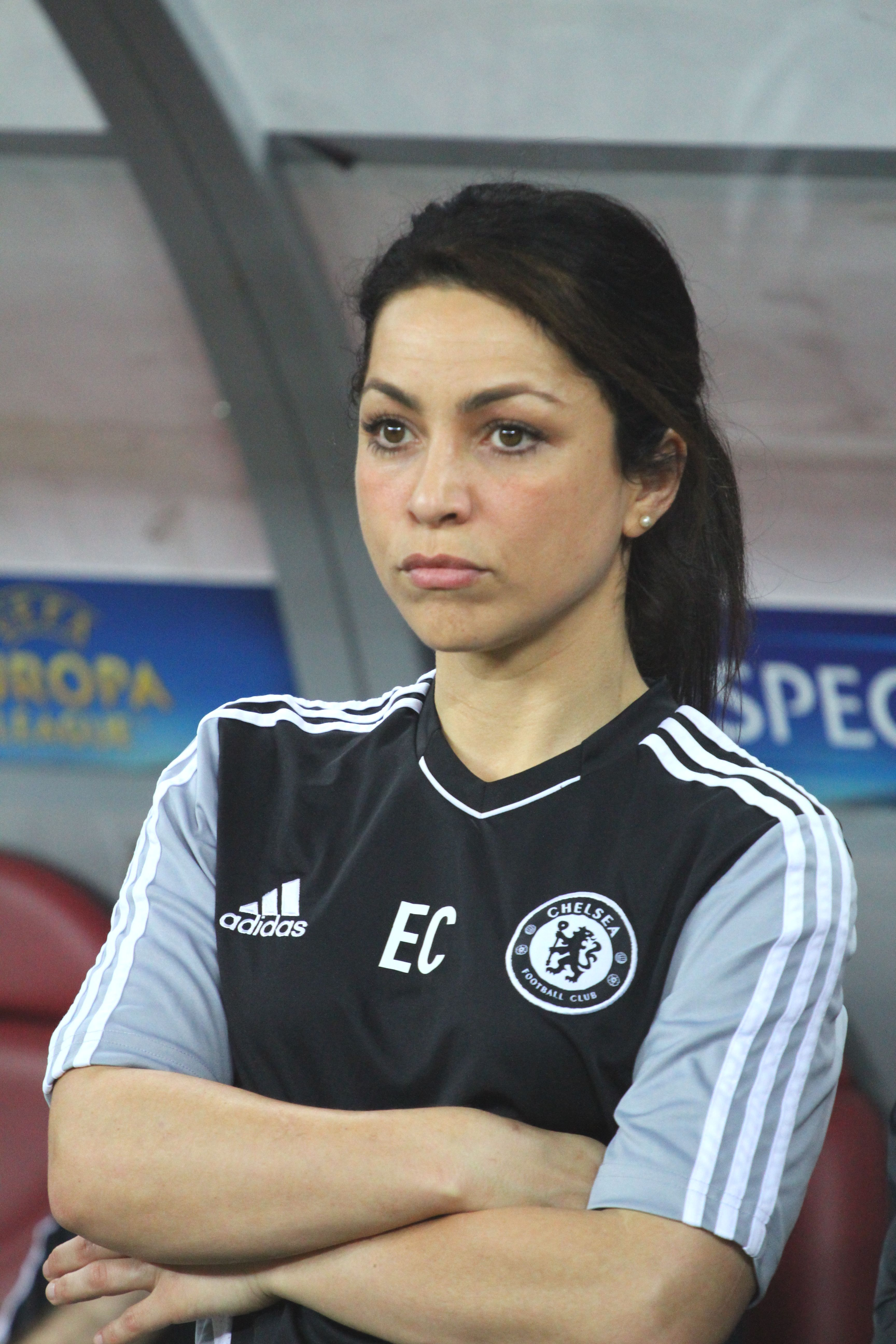
- Carneiro with Chelsea in 2013
- Born: 30 September 1973 (age 53); Gibraltar
- Education: University of Nottingham; Australasian College of Sports Physicians; Queen Mary University of London
- Employer: The Sports Medical Group
- Website: The Sports Medical Group

Eva Carneiro (born 30 September 1973) is a Gibraltarian sports medicine specialist who is best known for serving as the first-team doctor of Chelsea, which she joined in 2009.

Educated at the University of Nottingham, the Australasian College of Sport and Exercise Physicians in Melbourne and Queen Mary University of London, she worked variously for West Ham United, the Public Health Department, the Olympic Medical Institute, and the England women's football team. Carneiro was employed by Chelsea in 2009, leaving her position under controversial circumstances in September 2015.

== Early life ==
Carneiro was born in Gibraltar to a Spanish-Galician father Antonio Carneiro, an electrician, and his English wife Lourdes. At the age of 16, she was inspired to be a doctor in sport. She studied medicine at the University of Nottingham, spent two years at the Australasian College of Sports Physicians in Melbourne and completed her MSc in Sport and Exercise at Queen Mary University of London.

== Career ==
=== Early career ===
Carneiro worked for West Ham United upon completing her thesis, after which she was employed by the Public Health department at Islington Primary Care Trust before being appointed to the UK Sports and Medicine Specialist training programme with the Olympic Medical Institute preparing British athletes for the 2008 Olympic Games. She also worked with the England women's football team.

=== 2009–2015: Chelsea ===
Carneiro joined Chelsea in 2009 and in 2011 she was appointed by manager André Villas-Boas to work with the first team having previously worked with their reserve team squad. After his dismissal she continued to work for Chelsea under the managerships of Roberto Di Matteo, Rafael Benítez and José Mourinho.

In the 2014–15 season, Carneiro was reported to have been subjected to sexist chants by Arsenal, Manchester City and Manchester United supporters. The Football Association's Heather Rabbatts, from their Inclusion and Advisory Board, called on supporters to report sexism within the game with the FA vowing to act against sexist chanting. Chelsea called for an end to sexist chanting by fans. Prompted by the abuse aimed at Carneiro, UK Sports Minister, Helen Grant, demanded that sport do more to eradicate “the scourge of bigotry and discrimination”. Journalist Alex Clark of The Guardian quoted the abuse aimed at Carneiro as a reason to eradicate sexism from both within football and society in general. She was part of the backup team supporting the Chelsea side that won the Premier League and League Cup in 2015.

Carneiro and chief physiotherapist Jon Fearn were the subject of criticism from Mourinho after the first game of the 2015–16 season: Chelsea were playing Swansea City at Stamford Bridge. According to Mourinho, she and Fearn rushed onto the pitch to attend to Eden Hazard when he felt the injury was not of a serious nature. He was further annoyed because this meant that Chelsea, having already had a player sent off during the match, were temporarily left with eight outfield players. Under the Laws of the Game, medical staff are not allowed onto the field without the referee's permission, but have a duty to tend to an injured player when summoned. Carneiro and Fearn were twice summoned onto the field by referee Michael Oliver. Carneiro's view that she was simply doing her job has been fully supported by FIFA and its medical chairman Michel D’Hooghe. Both Fearn and Carneiro were absent for Chelsea's following game, away to Manchester City on 16 August.

Back in 2007, Mourinho admitted that he called match referee Mike Riley filho da puta, which is an abusive Portuguese expression which translates as "son of a bitch/whore". After the Carneiro incident, it was alleged that Mourinho had called her filha da puta, which translates as "daughter of a bitch/whore". Mourinho denied using the feminine form of the phrase, saying "Filho da puta is a phrase I often use, all of the players know it. There is no sexist connotation in the use of the phrase - it is just like saying 'f*** off'." On 22 September 2015, Carneiro left her position as first team doctor with Chelsea. On 30 September, after consulting a Portuguese language expert, the FA cleared Mourinho of making discriminatory comments towards Carneiro. Neither Mourinho nor Carneiro were called to give evidence to the FA. The report stated that the audio recording had been examined but did not contain the words which the expert concluded Mourinho had said.

Campaign group Women in Football, after consulting their own language expert, said they were "appalled" at the decision to clear Mourinho and that its language expert was certain Mourinho had used abusive language towards a woman, contrary to the verdict of the FA's expert. The decision to clear Mourinho also drew criticism from Football Association chairman, Greg Dyke, and Heather Rabbatts, the head of the FA's inclusion advisory board.

In October 2015, lawyers acting on behalf of Carneiro served notice of a claim of constructive dismissal against Chelsea Football Club. In March 2016, Sam Wallace, the Telegraph's chief football writer, contrasted the speed with which Chelsea resolved issues with players and managers with the 'disgrace' of its seven-month delay over the proper treatment of Carneiro. Wallace said that the next manager must resolve the problem.

Private negotiations took place in early 2016, with an employment tribunal scheduled for June 2016 and expected to last 10 days.

The tribunal was the subject of many newspapers' front pages, and was settled on confidential terms on the second day of the hearing. Chelsea issued an unreserved apology for distress caused to Carneiro and her family, and said "We wish to place on record that in running onto the pitch Dr Carneiro was following both the rules of the game and fulfilling her responsibility to the players as a doctor, putting their safety first." She also concluded the private case against Mourinho. Legal documents submitted to her employment tribunal revealed she had previously rejected an offer by the club of £1.2 million to settle the claim. The documents also revealed that Carneiro refused to return to work unless she received a 40% increase in salary to £400,000 per annum, a severance payment of one year's salary, participation in a bonus scheme “to properly reward me for my contribution to the club’s success”; and a “substantial payment” in compensation for distress.

=== 2016: Private practice ===
Carneiro operates a clinic in Harley Street specialising in sports medicine.

=== 2024: Lewes FC co-owner ===
In October 2024, it was announced that Carneiro had become one of the co-owners of the Isthmian League Premier League team Lewes FC.

== Personal life ==
On 11 November 2015, Carneiro married Jason De Carteret in St Patrick's Church, Soho Square, London.
