= List of polar explorers =

This list is for recognised pioneering explorers of the polar regions. It does not include subsequent travelers and expeditions.

== Polar explorers ==
- Aeneas Mackintosh
- Adolf Erik Nordenskiöld
- Adolphus Greely
- Adrien de Gerlache
- Albert Hastings Markham
- Albert P. Crary
- Alex Hibbert
- Alexander Kuchin
- Aleksandr Kolchak
- Alexander MacKenzie
- Alexander von Middendorff
- Alexey Tryoshnikov
- Alfred Björling
- Alfred Gabriel Nathorst
- Alfred Ritscher
- Alfred Wegener
- Alistair Mackay
- Andreas Peter Hovgaard
- Andrew Croft
- Andrew Regan
- Ann Bancroft
- Ann Daniels
- Antoni Bolesław Dobrowolski
- Antony Jinman
- Apsley Cherry-Garrard
- Augustine Courtauld
- Avgust Tsivolko
- Ben Saunders
- Bernhard Hantzsch
- Boris Vilkitsky
- Børge Ousland
- Carl Anton Larsen
- Carl Frederick Wandel
- Carsten Borchgrevink
- Cecil Madigan
- Charles Francis Hall
- Charlie Paton
- Christian Dahl
- Christian Leden
- Daniel Byles
- Dmitry Laptev
- Dmitry Ovtsyn
- Donal T. Manahan
- Douglas Mawson
- Dwayne Fields
- Edgar Evans
- Edgeworth David
- Edith Ronne
- Edmund Hillary
- Eduard Dallmann
- Eduard Toll
- Edward Bransfield
- Edward Evans
- Edward Israel
- Edward Nelson
- Edward W. Bingham
- Edward Wilson
- Edwin de Haven
- Ejnar Mikkelsen
- Elisha Kent Kane
- Emil Racovita
- Émile Danco
- Eric Marshall
- Eric Philips
- Erich von Drygalski
- Erling Kagge
- Ernest de Koven Leffingwell
- Ernest Shackleton
- Evald Kallstenius
- Fabian von Bellingshausen
- Fedot Popov
- Ferdinand von Wrangel
- Fiann Paul
- Finn Ronne
- Francis Crozier
- Francis Leopold McClintock
- Frank Wild
- Frank Worsley
- Frederick A. Cook
- Fridtjof Nansen
- Fritz Loewe
- Fyodor Litke
- Fyodor Matisen
- Fyodor Matyushkin
- Fyodor Minin
- George Comer
- George J. Dufek
- George Nares
- George W. De Long
- George W. Rice
- Georges Lecointe
- Georgy Sedov
- Georgiy Baidukov
- Georgy Brusilov
- Georgy Ushakov
- Gerald Ketchum
- Gerhard Muller
- Gino Watkins
- Godske Lindenov
- Helmer Hanssen
- Henry Cookson
- Henry Hudson
- Henry Robertson Bowers
- Henryk Arctowski
- Hjalmar Johansen
- Hjalmar Riiser-Larsen
- Hubert Wilkins
- Isaac Israel Hayes
- Ivan Lyakhov
- Ivan Papanin
- Ivan Simonov
- Jacques Cartier
- James Cook
- James Clark Ross
- James Marr
- James Weddell
- Jameson Adams
- Janice Meek
- Jason De Carteret
- Jean-Baptiste Charcot
- Jim McNeill
- Johann Georg Gmelin
- John Balleny
- John Franklin
- John Hornby
- John Huston
- John Rae
- John Richardson
- John Ross
- John Rymill
- Jon Bowermaster
- Josée Auclair
- Jules Dumont d'Urville
- Karl Baer
- Khariton Laptev
- Knud Rasmussen
- Konstantin Badygin
- Lars Christensen
- Lauge Koch
- Lawrence Wager
- Leo Gburek
- Lewis Gordon Pugh
- Lincoln Ellsworth
- Louise Arner Boyd
- Maria Klenova
- Mark Agnew
- Martin Frobisher
- Matthew A. Henson
- Matvei Gedenschtrom
- Merkury Vagin
- Michael Barne
- Mikhail Babushkin
- Mikhail Somov
- Mikhail Stadukhin
- Nathaniel Palmer
- Nikifor Begichev
- Nikolai Kolomeitsev
- Nikolai Pinegin
- Nikolay Urvantsev
- Nina Demme
- Nobu Shirase
- Olav Bjaaland
- Oscar Wisting
- Otto Kalvitsa
- Otto Nordenskjöld
- Otto Schmidt
- Otto Sverdrup
- Paul Landry
- Paul Siple
- Paul Walker
- Pavel Senko
- Pen Hadow
- Percy Lemon
- Peter Freuchen
- Philip Brocklehurst
- Pierre-Esprit Radisson
- Piotr Fyodorovich Anjou
- Pyotr Pakhtusov
- Pyotr Shirshov
- Quintin Riley
- Ralph Plaisted
- Richard Evelyn Byrd
- Richard Profit
- Richard Weber
- Roald Amundsen
- Robert Bartlett
- Robert Edwin Peary
- Robert Falcon Scott
- Robert M. Berry
- Robert Swan
- Rudolf Samoylovich
- Rune Malterud
- Salomon August Andrée
- Samuel Hearne
- Sebastian Copeland
- Semion Chelyuskin
- Martin Lindsay
- Sir Ranulph Fiennes
- Sverre Hassel
- Stepan Malygin
- Stian Aker
- Sydney L. Kirkby
- Tatiana Pronchishcheva
- Tobias Furneaux
- Todd Carmichael
- Tom Crean
- Umberto Cagni
- Umberto Nobile
- Valerian Albanov
- Valery Chkalov
- Vasili Chichagov
- Vasili Pronchishchev
- Vilhjalmur Stefansson
- Vivian Fuchs
- Vladimir Rusanov
- Vladimir Vize
- Wally Herbert
- Walter Wellman
- Wilhelm Filchner
- Will Steger
- Willem Barents
- William Parry
- William Scoresby
- William Speirs Bruce
- Yakov Gakkel
- Yakov Permyakov
- Yakov Sannikov
- Yevgeny Tolstikov

== See also ==
- List of Russian explorers
- List of female explorers and travelers
