= Ann Daniels =

English polar explorer

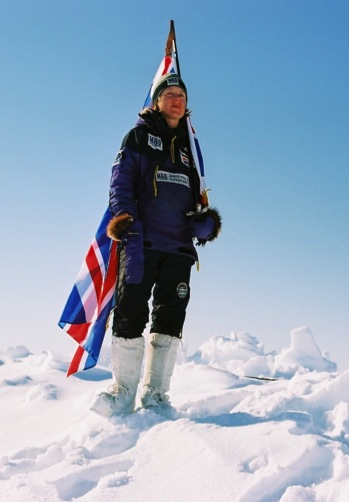
- Daniels at the North Pole in 2002
- Born: 1964; Bradford, England
- Occupations: Assistant bank manager (former); Motivational speaker
- Known for: Polar exploration
- Daniel's voice recorded September 2014

Ann Daniels (born 1964 or 1965) is a British polar explorer and motivational speaker. She and her team-mate Caroline Hamilton were the first women to reach both the North Pole and South Pole as part of all-women teams, in 2002.

Daniels was born Bradford, England, and grew up there, with four older brothers. Her father was an insurance salesman, her mother a secretary. She worked for NatWest, achieving promotion to assistant bank manager, a post which she gave up in 1994, when her triplets were born.

She first reached the North Pole on in the 1997 McVities Penguin Polar Relay, and has been there at least six times in all.

Her first attempt to reach the North Pole solo, walking from Russia, was called off in 2005.

She appeared as a castaway on the BBC Radio programme Desert Island Discs on 21 January 2007, and was awarded an honorary DUniv degree Staffordshire University in the same year.

She led Catlin Arctic Survey expeditions in 2009, 2010 and 2011, with Pen Hadow.

She is the mother of four children, three of them (two girls and a boy) triplets from her first marriage, plus a daughter from a second partner.
