= Stian Aker =

Norwegian polar explorer

Stian Aker (born June 17, 1980) is a Norwegian polar explorer. He won the race to the South Pole as a member of "Team Missing Link", in 2008/2009. This was the first race to the South Pole since Scott and Amundsen’s historic race nearly 100 years ago. They completed the race (770 km) in 17 days and 11 hours.
