= Institute of Petroleum Safety, Health and Environment Management =

Training institute in Goa, India

- Main Gate of Institute of Petroleum Safety, Health and Environment Management (2018)
- Established: 1989
- Head: Sanjeev Singhal
- Owner: Oil and Natural Gas Corporation
- Location: Betul, Goa, India
- Coordinates: 15°08′09″N 73°56′52″E
- Interactive map of Institute of Petroleum Safety, Health and Environment Management

The Institute of Petroleum Safety, Health and Environment Management (IPSHEM) is a training institute of the Oil and Natural Gas Corporation that provides technical education in the fields of industrial safety, occupational health and environmental science.

== History ==
The institute's inception was conceived by ONGC during its 230th Executive Committee meeting on November 28, 1984, emphasizing Health, Safety and Environment within the petroleum industry.

At first, the institute was founded in 1989; however, it commenced operations from its own campus in Betul in South Goa, starting in 1997. It was set up following a feasibility study and master plan developed by Norwegian consultants SikteC A/S, supported by the Norwegian Agency for Development Cooperation, as part of a bilateral agreement between India and Norway.

As of December 2023, ONCG is planning to upgrade this institute with a budget of ₹250 crore (US$30 million).

== Programs ==
It organizes training programs which are categorized into Basic, Advanced, and Accredited levels. Also, it conducts safety audits, develops emergency response plans, and creates disaster management strategies for different petroleum and petrochemical installations across India.
