= Rune Malterud =

Norwegian explorer (born 1981)

- Born: January 1, 1981 (age 44)
- Occupation(s): Polar explorer and physiotherapist
- Known for: Winning the race to the south pole

Rune Malterud (born January 1, 1981) is a Norwegian polar explorer and physiotherapist.

He won the race to the South Pole as a member of "Team Missing Link", in 2008/2009. This was the first race to the South Pole since Scott and Amundsen’s historic race nearly 100 years ago. They completed the race (770 km) in 17 days and 11 hours.
