= Antony Jinman =

British polar adventurer (born 1981)

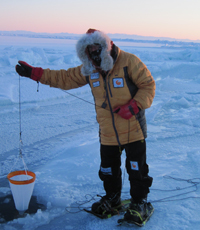
- Antony Jinman conducting scientific research at the North Pole in 2010
- Born: 8 April 1981 (age 44); Wembury, Devon, United Kingdom
- Occupations: British polar explorer
- Known for: Polar explorer

Antony Jinman (born 8 April 1981) is a British polar adventurer.

== Early life ==
Jinman was born in Wembury, in Devon near Plymouth. He attended school at Wembury Primary School and then Plymstock School. After four years in the British Armed Forces he left to become an expedition leader.

== Expeditions ==
=== Baffin Island ===
Baffin Island is the main hub of Jinman's Arctic expedition work. His first trip to the Baffin Island was as part of a team that helped raise £180,000 for The Mitchemp Trust. In 2009 he travelled with two graduate students to the area. He has completed the 2010 Baffin Island Outreach Expedition, taking 8 graduate students.

Antony has also recorded a documentary about the effects of global warming in the Baffin Island region called 'The Land That Never Melts', about the Auyuittuq National Park.

=== North Pole ===
In 2010, Jinman along with two teammates reached the geographic North Pole. Antony and his teammates, Eric Larsen and Darcy St Laurent skied and snow shoed (and sometimes swam) over 500 miles from Cape Discovery to the North Pole taking 51 days.

=== South Pole ===
In 2014 Jinman skied 730 miles solo to the Geographic South Pole in just 46 days. Upon reaching the Pole on 17 January 2014, Jinman became only the 12th Briton to have achieved this feat.

== Education ==
=== Education Through Expeditions ===
As well as being an explorer, Antony Jinman is a climate change educator. He often visits schools to deliver presentations on his experiences in the Arctic. He has also set up a web company, Education Through Expeditions, which aims to provide climate change education resources for teachers.

In 2011, Jinman was awarded the honorary degree Doctor of Education from the University of the West of England.
