= Jason De Carteret =

British polar explorer and musher

Jason De Carteret, born on the British island of Guernsey, is a polar explorer. He took part in the Ice Challenger Expedition and holds (or has held) skiing and vehicle world records for polar exploration. He has worked as a commercial helicopter pilot.

Along with two companions in 2011 he drove a modified Toyota Tacoma overland from Patriot Hills to the South Pole, a distance of over 1,000 kilometres (620 mi) in a world record time of less than forty hours – over twenty-nine hours quicker than the record time he had set previously. He has also travelled to both Poles by skiing.

== Personal life ==
On 11 November 2015 De Carteret married Dr Eva Carneiro.

== See also ==
- Todd Carmichael
