= Ice Challenger Expedition =

Expedition to the South Pole

The Ice Challenger Expedition was an expedition to the geographic South Pole. The expedition's six man team used a six-wheel drive vehicle to cover about 1,000 miles.

Not to be confused with the Ice Challenger expedition to traverse the ice floes in the Bering Strait.

== Expedition details ==
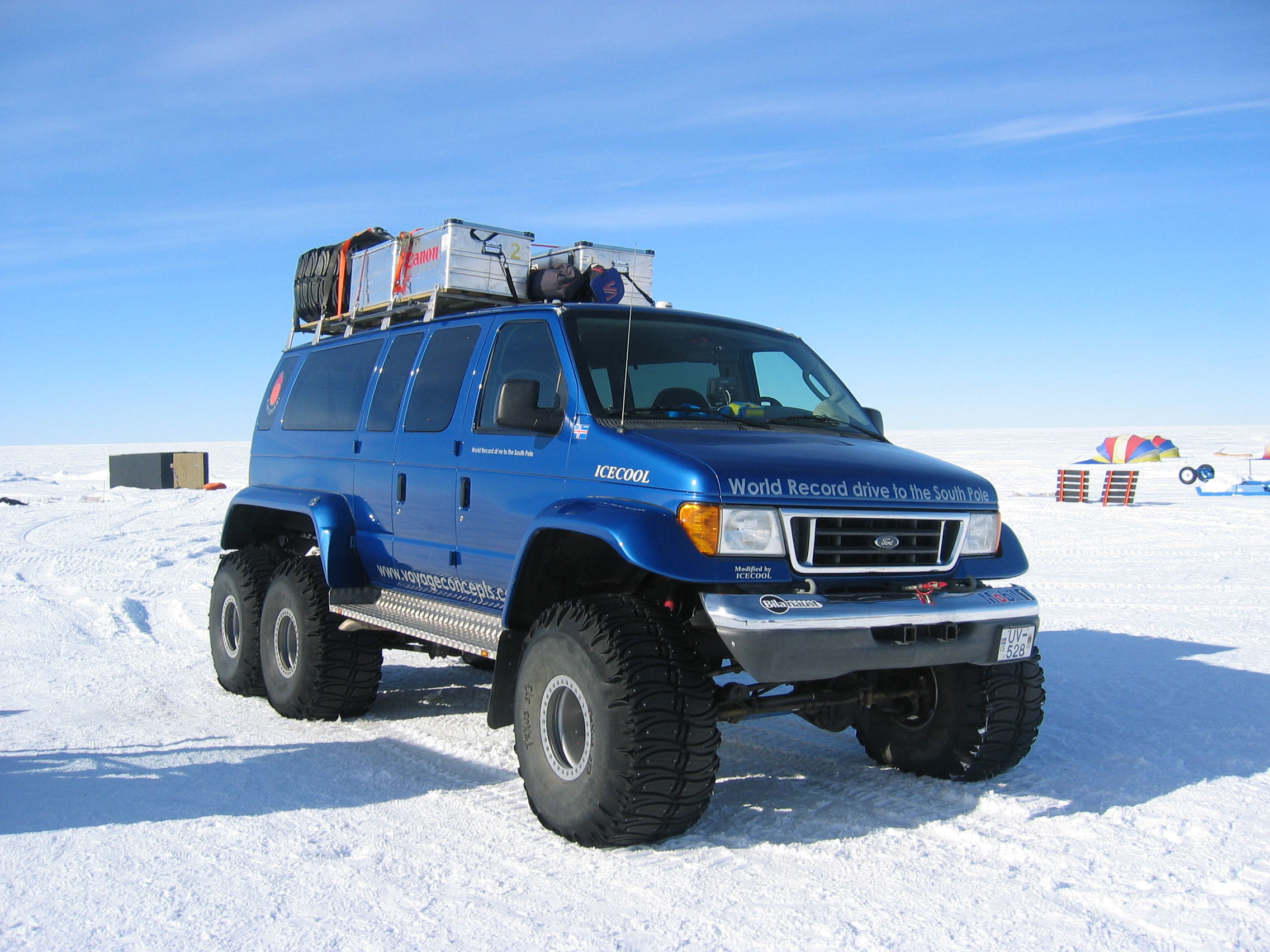
Ice Challenger vehicle at Patriot Hills

In 2005 a team of six people took part in the Ice Challenger Expedition. Traveling in a specially designed and modified 4th-gen Ford_E-Series six-wheel drive van, the team completed the journey from the Antarctic coast at Patriot Hills to the geographic South Pole in 69 hours. In doing so they easily beat the previous record of 24 days. They arrived at the South Pole on 12 December 2005. The team members on that expedition were Andrew Regan, Jason De Carteret, Andrew Moon, Richard Griffiths, Gunnar Egilsson, and Andrew Miles. The expedition hoped to show that wheeled transport on the continent is not only possible but also more practical. It was also aimed at increasing awareness about global warming.

== Further expeditions ==
A second expedition led by Andrew Regan and Andrew Moon is departed in November 2010. The Moon-Regan Trans Antarctic Expedition traversed the entire continent, using 2 six wheel drive vehicles and a Bio-Inspired Ice Vehicle. The team used the expedition to raise awareness about the global environmental importance of the Antarctic region and to show that bio-fuel can be a viable and environmentally friendly option.

== See also ==
- South Pole Traverse
