= Imperial Energy Corporation =

Indian oil extraction company

Imperial Energy Corporation PLC
- Company type: Subsidiary of Oil and Natural Gas Corporation
- Industry: Oil and gas industry
- Founded: 2004
- Headquarters: Leeds, United Kingdom
- Key people: Peter Levine, Chairman; Christopher Hopkinson, CEO
- Revenue: US$19.9 million (2007)
- Operating income: US$39 million (2007)
- Net income: US$42.5 million (2007)
- Owner: Oil and Natural Gas Corporation
- Website: imperialenergy.com

Imperial Energy Corporation PLC is a wholly owned subsidiary of the Oil and Natural Gas Corporation which is under the ownership of Ministry of Petroleum and Natural Gas of the Government of India operating in Siberia. It is British-based and headquartered in Leeds.

== History ==
The business was founded in 2004. In 2007 it was first listed on the London Stock Exchange. The company was acquired by ONGC for $2.1 billion in January 2009.

== Operations ==
Imperial Energy Corporation produces approximately 80% of its oil from Maiskoye field and 20% from Snezhnoye field in Tomsk region. The company had an extraordinarily high exploration success rate under British management with exploration activity on all blocks, in particular block 80 to the north of the river Ob, where a significant new Cretaceous play was discovered in June 2008. However, recent exploration results under the new Indian management have been disappointing. In addition, new investment aimed at boosting production has not materialised causing production levels to drop below targets. The parent company ONGC have recently run into trouble with the Government over poor operational results, unpaid salaries, legal confrontations with staff and outsourcing of valuable contracts to foreign companies resulting in a warning that future projects involving ONGC depended on better results from this current project.

Imperial Energy have a large number of promising and previously undrilled structures in all blocks in addition to 3.5 billion barrels of reserves currently in the 3p or 'possible' category. New exploration wells and seismic data are planned for 2010.

Imperial Energy has two operational pipelines flowing west of the Ob River: the 152 kilometres (94 mi) long Maiskoye-Luginetskoye pipeline and the 152 kilometres (94 mi) Snezhnoye-Zavyalovo pipeline, connected with the Transneft's pipeline system. The company also constructs the third pipeline linking its Block 80, East of the Ob River, to Zavyalovo.

== Subsidiaries ==
The company is currently operating through four subsidiaries:

- Allianceneftegaz
- Sevkazgra
- Sibinterneft
- Nord Imperial

The business is organised on a geographic basis:

- Tomsk Oblast of Western Siberia
- Kostanai in North Central Kazakhstan
