= Pen Hadow =

British explorer

- Born: 26 February 1962 (age 64); Perth, Scotland
- Education: University College London
- Occupations: Polar explorer, author
- Known for: First solo trek, without resupply, from Canada to the North Geographic Pole
- Website: penhadow.com

Rupert Nigel Pendrill Hadow, known as Pen Hadow (born 26 February 1962), is a British Arctic region explorer, advocate, adventurer and guide. He is the only person to have trekked solo, and without resupply by third parties, from Canada to the Geographic North Pole. He is also the first Briton to have trekked, without resupply by third parties, to both the North and South Geographic Poles from the respective continental coastlines of North America and Antarctica. Hadow also led the Catlin Arctic Survey (2007-2012) which investigated sea ice volume, ocean acidification and ocean circulation.

== Early life and education ==
Son of Nigel Philip Ian Hadow and Anne Pendrill Callingham, Hadow was educated at Temple Grove School, a former independent school at Heron's Ghyll in East Sussex, and at Harrow School, an independent school in London, where he was Head of School and captain of the school's rugby and Harrow Football teams.

In 1977, while at Harrow, he inaugurated the school tradition of Long Ducker, a 20-mile run from Harrow-on-the-Hill to Marble Arch and back raising £101.58 for the Queen's Silver Jubilee Fund in the process. Though reported at the time by the school's headmaster as having last been run in 1927, the school commissioned research in 2014 which found that Hadow was the first recorded person ever to have run the full distance. The running of Long Ducker has since become one of the school's major annual events involving pupils, teachers, support staff and parents and can raise in excess of £100,000 for charity each year. He attended University College London where he was awarded the Professor Bill Mead Scholarship, and graduated with a BA (Hons) in Geography in 1984.

== Life and career ==
Hadow worked at Mark McCormack's Sports Organisation from 1985 to 1988, acting as an agent representing the European equestrian interests of International Management Group (IMG). He managed IMG's relationship with the Swedish Equestrian Federation to deliver the funds, through corporate sponsorship, to underwrite the staging costs of the inaugural World Equestrian Games in Stockholm (1990). The Games brought together the world championship events of the six disciplines under the jurisdiction of the International Equestrian Federation (FEI): dressage; eventing; vaulting; carriage driving; endurance; and show jumping.

In 1995 he set up The Polar Travel Company offering guided expeditions to the Arctic and Antarctic, and most notably the North Geographic Pole. In 1997 he organised the McVitie's Penguin Polar Relay, the first all-women expedition to the North Geographic Pole, involving 20 British women, operating in five teams of four, accompanied throughout by two professional women Canadian guides.

Hadow is an Honorary Vice-President of the Royal Scottish Geographical Society, an Honorary Vice-President of the Scientific Exploration Society, an Honorary Patron of British Exploring, and President of the OH Adventurers. He received an Honorary Doctorate of Laws from the University of Exeter (2004), and an Honorary Doctorate of Science from the University of Plymouth (2009).

=== North Pole - Solo, unsupported ===
In 2003, Hadow trekked 770 km from Ward Hunt Island, Canada to the North Geographic Pole in 64 days becoming the first person to complete the journey solo and without resupply. He started the trek on 17 March 2003, pulling a 265 lb sledge and arrived 19 May. Of the 850 hours travelling across the disintegrating sea ice, he swam part of the way wearing an immersion suit when he encountered open water or thin ice. His book Solo: Alone & Unsupported to the North Pole (published by Michael Joseph) recounts the journey.

=== South Pole ===
In 2004, Hadow partnered with Simon Murray for a trek to the South Geographic Pole. The 1,200 km trek started 5 December 2003, on Antarctica's Zumberge Coast, approximately 120 km to the east of the traditional Hercules Inlet start point, and was completed on reaching the South Pole on 28 January 2004. Murray (41) became the oldest person to reach the South Pole from the continental coastline; and the expedition raised US$450,000 for the Royal Geographical Society (London)

=== Catlin Arctic Surveys ===
In 2009, Hadow organised and led an exploration team to survey the thickness of the winter-spring sea ice in the northern Beaufort Sea area (Arctic Ocean). Its purpose was to provide a new source of information from the ocean's surface to help forecast how long the perennial sea-ice cover would continue to be a year-round surface feature of the planet. The expedition, known as the "Catlin Arctic Survey" after lead sponsor Catlin Group Limited, an international speciality insurance and reinsurance company, covered 430 km in 73 days, with Hadow accompanied by Arctic explorer, Ann Daniels, and photographer Martin Hartley.

The Survey's observations, viewed in the context of decades of existing measurements by submarines, satellites and buoys, led Professor Peter Wadhams of the Polar Ocean Physics Group (University of Cambridge) to suggest the Survey's work added further evidence to an emerging view that there is a significant probability that by 2020 only 20% of the Arctic Ocean basin will have sea ice cover in the late summer. Professor Wadhams also suggested that by 2030–40, there is a significant probability that the Arctic Ocean's sea ice cover will be transformed into an ice-free open ocean in summer times.

Catlin Group Limited continued its support of the Arctic Survey in 2010, with a scientific focus on ocean acidification and in 2011 on ocean thermo-haline circulation.

In 2010 and 2011 the Surveys, delivered by newly formed Geo Mission Ltd, involved two inter-linked field research components: a seasonal (winter/spring) research base located on the sea ice of the Gustav Adolph Sea on the edge of the Arctic Ocean (off Ellef Ringnes island) amongst Canada's northernmost Queen Elizabeth islands, and a 300 – 450 km transect of the Arctic Ocean surveyed by a team of explorers in the Winter / Spring. Scientific papers have since been published by the participating research groups.

Hadow, Chip Cunliffe and Martin Hartley co-edited the book, 'Catlin Arctic Survey: Investigating the Changing Arctic Ocean Environment', published by Polarworld (2013).

In summer 2017, he led Arctic Mission, which became the first boat expedition without icebreakers to sail into the ice-free international waters surrounding the North Geographic Pole. Its pioneering research into the wildlife, ecosystem, and marine pollution of these waters was led in the field by Tim Gordon (University of Exeter, UK). Its marine pollution work was cited by Senator Sheldon Whitehouse (Rhode Island) in the US Senate to introduce the 'Save Our Seas Act'.

== Personal life ==
From 1995 to 2013, Hadow was married to Mary Frances (daughter of Eton housemaster Matthew Archibald Nicholson), with whom he had two children. In 2017, he married Venetia Jenkins (née Cooper)

Hadow shared a Nanny (Enid) with his father, Nigel, and Sir Peter Scott, only son of Captain Robert Falcon Scott
