= Defence costs =

Defence costs are the cost that are incurred in the defence of a criminal trial in England and Wales. Should a defendant be acquitted they will almost always be awarded their defence costs.

Defence costs will arise when a defendant is privately represented in a criminal matter. To be privately represented means that the defence will not be covered by legal aid. This tends to be because the defendant in question is wealthy.

Defence costs will be assessed by a taxation master at the conclusion of most successful criminal trials. Defendants will only be entitled to the proportion of their costs that are found to be reasonable.
