= Oil and Natural Gas Corporation =

Indian crude oil and natural gas producer

Oil and Natural Gas Corporation Limited
- Type: Central public sector enterprise
- Traded as: NSE: ONGC; BSE: 500312; NSE NIFTY 50 constituent
- ISIN: INE213A01029
- Industry: Energy: Oil and gas
- Founded: 14 August 1956; 70 years ago
- Headquarters: Deendayal Urja Bhawan, 5A-5B Nelson Mandela Road, Vasant Kunj, Delhi, India
- Area served: Worldwide
- Key people: Sunil Kumar (chairman & CEO)
- Products: Petroleum; Natural gas; LNG; Lubricants; Petrochemicals; Electricity
- Revenue: ▲₹6.77 trillion (US$70 billion) (2026)
- Operating income: ▲₹1.03 trillion (US$11 billion) (2026)
- Net income: ▲₹498 billion (US$5.2 billion) (2026)
- Total assets: ▲₹7.91 trillion (US$82 billion) (2026)
- Total equity: ▲₹3.72 trillion (US$39 billion) (2026)
- Owner: Government of India (58.89%)
- Number of employees: 23,967 (June 2025)
- Divisions: Mangalore Refinery and Petrochemicals Limited; ONGC Videsh; ONGC Petro-Additions Limited; ONGC Tripura Power Company
- Subsidiaries: Hindustan Petroleum; Imperial Energy Corporation; Petronet LNG; ONGC Green
- Website: www.ongcindia.com

The Oil and Natural Gas Corporation Limited (ONGC) is an Indian central public sector undertaking which is the largest government-owned oil and gas explorer and producer in the country. It accounts for around 70 per cent of India's domestic production of crude oil and around 84 per cent of natural gas. Headquartered in Delhi, ONGC is under the ownership of the Government of India and administration of Ministry of Petroleum and Natural Gas. It was founded on 14 August 1956 by the Government of India under Prime Minister Jawaharlal Nehru. In November 2010, the Government of India conferred the Maharatna status to ONGC.

In a survey by the Government of India for fiscal year 2019–20, it was ranked as the largest profit making central public sector undertaking (PSU) in India. It is ranked 5th among the Top 250 Global Energy Companies by Platts.

ONGC is vertically integrated across the entire oil and gas industry. It is involved in exploring for and exploiting hydrocarbons in 26 sedimentary basins of India, owns and operates over 11,000 kilometers of pipelines in the country and operates a total of around 230 drilling and workover rigs. Its international subsidiary ONGC Videsh currently has projects in 15 countries. ONGC has discovered seven out of the eight producing Indian basins, adding over 7.15 billion tonnes of In-place Oil & Gas volume of hydrocarbons in Indian basins. Against a global decline of production from matured fields, ONGC has maintained production from its brownfields like Mumbai High, with the help of aggressive investments in various IOR (improved oil recovery) and EOR (Enhanced Oil Recovery) schemes. ONGC has many matured fields with a current recovery factor of 25–33%. Its Reserve Replacement Ratio for between 2005 and 2013, has been more than one.

During FY 2012–13, ONGC had to share the highest ever under-recovery of ₹89.77 trillion (US$1.53 trillion) (an increase of ₹17.89 billion (US$305.3 million) over the previous financial year) towards the under-recoveries of Oil Marketing Companies (IOC, BPCL and HPCL).

On 1 November 2017, the Union Cabinet approved ONGC for acquiring a majority 51.11% stake in Hindustan Petroleum Corporation Limited (HPCL). On 30 January 2018, ONGC completed the acquisition of 51.11% stake in HPCL.

== History ==
=== Foundation to 1956 ===
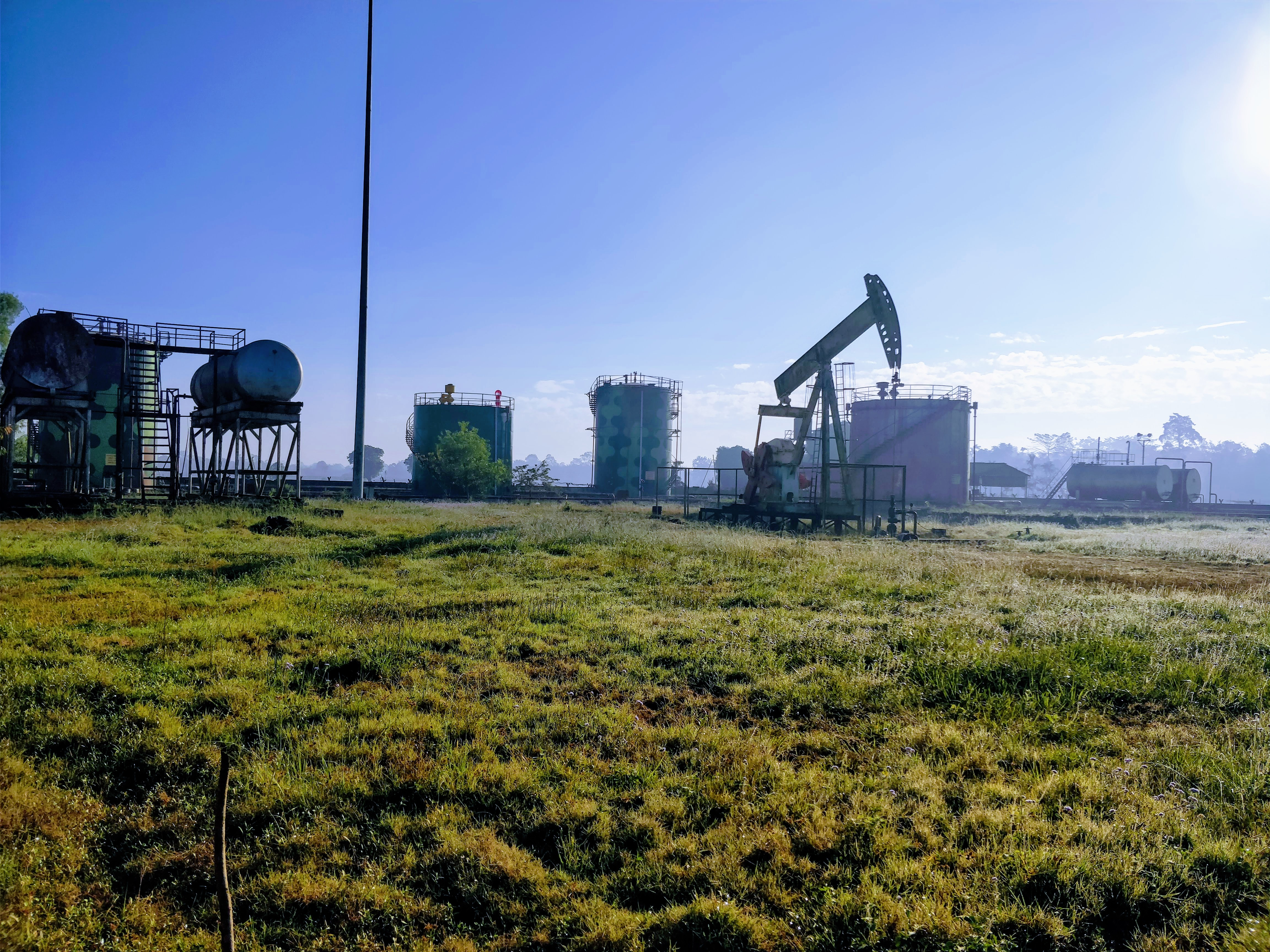
Pumpjack working in an oilfield of ONGC at Sivasagar, Assam

Before the independence of India in 1947, the Assam Oil Company in the north-eastern and Attock Oil Company in the north-western part of the undivided India were the only oil-producing companies, with minimal exploration input. The major part of Indian sedimentary basins was deemed to be unfit for the development of oil and gas resources.

After independence, the Central Government of India realized the importance of oil and gas for rapid industrial development and its strategic role in defence. Consequently, while framing the Industrial Policy Statement of 1948, the development of the petroleum industry in the country was considered to be of utmost necessity.

Until 1955, private oil companies mainly carried out exploration of hydrocarbon resources of India. In Assam, the Assam Oil Company was producing oil at Digboi (discovered in 1889) and Oil India Ltd. (a 50% joint venture between Government of India and Burmah Oil Company) was engaged in developing two newly discovered large fields Naharkatiya and Moraan in Assam. In West Bengal, the Indo-Stanvac Petroleum project (a joint venture between the Government of India and Standard Vacuum Oil Company of USA) was engaged in exploration work. The vast sedimentary tract in other parts of India and adjoining offshore remained largely unexplored.

In 1955, the Government of India decided to develop the oil and natural gas resources in the various regions of the country as part of the public sector development. With this objective, an Oil and Natural Gas Directorate was set up towards the end of 1955, as a subordinate office under the then Ministry of Natural Resources and Scientific Research. The department was constituted with a nucleus of geoscientists from the Geological Survey of India.

A delegation under the leadership of the minister of Natural Resources visited several European countries to study the status of the oil industry in those countries and to facilitate the training of Indian professionals for exploring potential oil and gas reserves. Experts from Romania, the Soviet Union, the United States and West Germany subsequently visited India and helped the government with their expertise. Soviet experts later drew up a detailed plan for geological and geophysical surveys and drilling operations to be carried out in the 2nd Five Year Plan (1956–61).

In April 1956, the Government of India adopted the Industrial Policy Resolution, which placed Mineral Oil Industry among the schedule 'A' industries, the future development of which was to be the sole and exclusive responsibility of the state.

Soon, after the formation of the Oil and Natural Gas Directorate, it became apparent that it would not be possible for the Directorate with its limited financial and administrative powers as a subordinate office of the Government, to function efficiently. So in August 1956, the Directorate was raised to the status of a commission with enhanced powers, although it continued to be under the government. In October 1959, the commission was converted into a statutory body by an act of the Indian Parliament, which enhanced powers of the commission further. The main functions of the Oil and Natural Gas Commission subject to the provisions of the Act were "to plan, promote, organize and implement programs for development of Petroleum Resources and the production and sale of petroleum and petroleum products produced by it, and to perform such other functions as the Central Government may, from time to time, assign to it ". The act further outlined the activities and steps to be taken by ONGC in fulfilling its mandate.

=== 1961 to 2000 ===
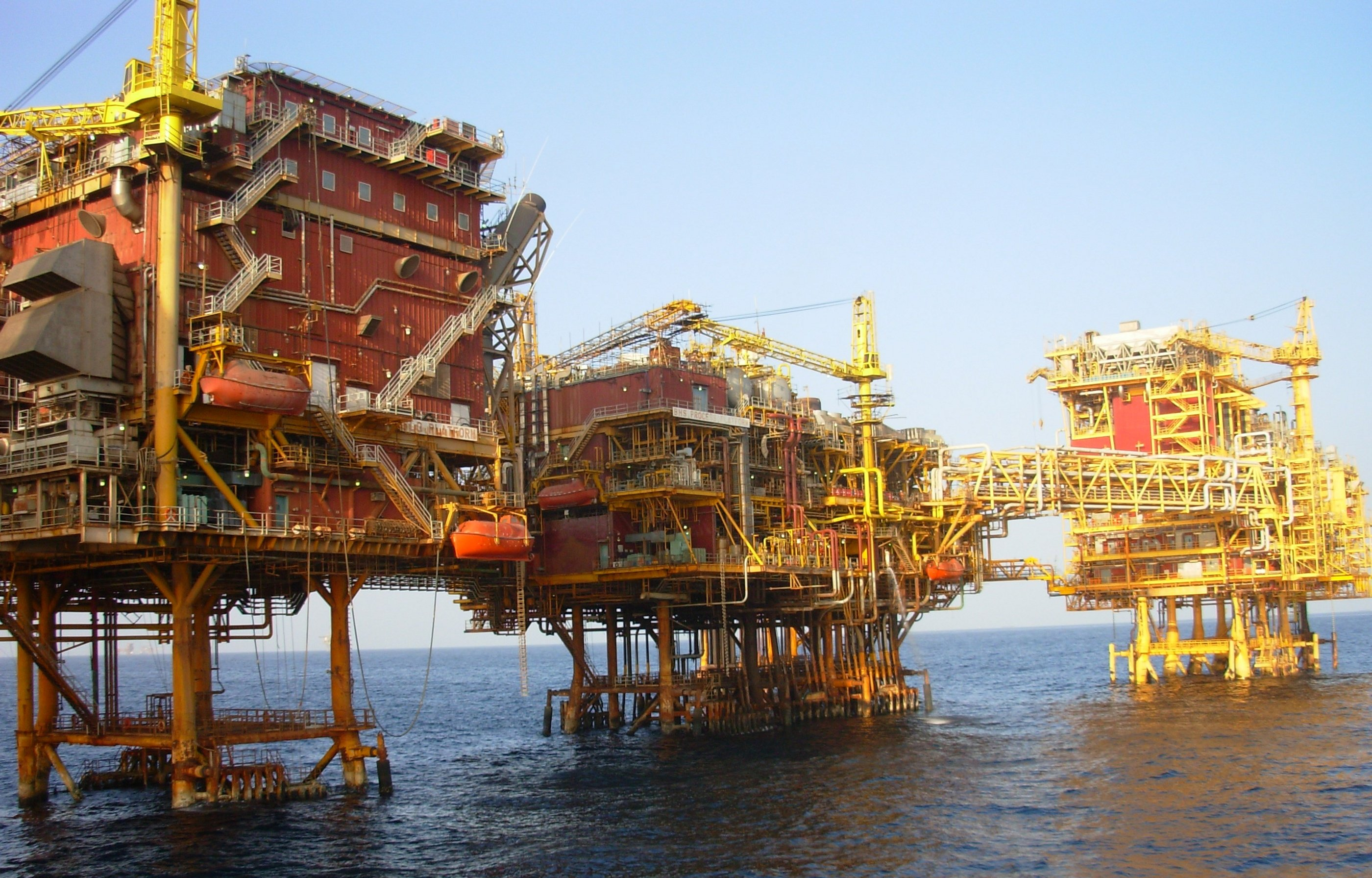
An ONGC platform at Bombay High in the Arabian Sea

Since its inception, ONGC has been instrumental in transforming the country's limited upstream sector into a large viable playing field, with its activities spread throughout India and significantly in overseas territories. In the inland areas, ONGC not only found new resources in Assam but also established new oil province in Cambay basin (Gujarat), while adding new petroliferous areas in the Assam-Arakan Fold Belt and East coast basins (both onshore and offshore).

In 1963, ONGC discovered oil and gas sites in Sivasagar district and established oilfields in Lakua, Gelekey, and Rudrasagar.

ONGC went offshore in the early 1970s and discovered a giant oil field in the form of Bombay High, now known as Mumbai High. This discovery, along with subsequent discoveries of huge oil and gas fields in Western offshore changed the oil scenario of the country. Subsequently, over 5 billion tonnes of hydrocarbons, which were present in the country, were discovered. The most important contribution of ONGC, however, is its self-reliance and development of core competence in E&P activities at a globally competitive level.

ONGC became a public listed company in February 1994, with 20% of its equity were sold to the public and eighty per cent retained by the Indian government. At the time, ONGC employed 48,000 people and had reserves and surpluses worth ₹104.34 billion (equivalent to ₹750 billion or US$7.8 billion in 2026), in addition to its intangible assets. The corporation's net worth of ₹107.77 billion (US$3.43 billion) was the largest of any Indian company.

In 1958 the then chairman, Keshav Dev Malaviya, held a meeting with some geologists in the Mussoorie office of the Geology Directorate where he accepted the need for ONGC to go outside India too in order to enhance Indian owned capacity for oil production. The argument in support for this step, by LP Mathur and BS Negi, was that Indian demand for crude would go up at a faster rate than discoveries by ONGC in India.

Malaviya followed this up by making ONGC apply for exploration licences in the Persian Gulf. Iran gave ONGC four blocks and Malaviya visited Milan and Bartlesville, Oklahoma to request ENI and Phillips Petroleum to join as partners in the Iran venture. This resulted in the discovery of the Rostum oilfield in the early 'sixties, very soon after the discovery of Ankleshwar in Gujarat. This was the very first investment by the Indian public sector in foreign countries and oil from Rostum and Raksh was brought to Cochin where it was refined in a refinery built with technical assistance from Phillips.

=== 2001 to present ===
In 2003, ONGC Videsh Limited (OVL), the division of ONGC concerned with its foreign assets, acquired Talisman Energy's 25% stake in the Greater Nile Oil project.

In 2006, a commemorative coin set was issued to mark the 50th anniversary of the founding of ONGC, making it only the second Indian company (State Bank of India being the first) to have such a coin issued in its honour.

In 2011, ONGC applied to purchase 2000 acres of land at Dahanu to process offshore gas. ONGC Videsh, along with Statoil ASA (Norway) and Repsol SA (Spain), has been engaged in deep-water drilling off the northern coast of Cuba in 2012. On 11 August 2012, ONGC announced that it had made a large oil discovery in the D1 oilfield off the west coast of India, which will help it to raise the output of the field from around 12,500 barrels per day (bpd) to a peak output of 60,000 bpd.

In January 2014, OVL and Oil India completed the acquisition of Videocon Group's ten per cent stake in a Mozambican gas field for a total of $2.47 billion.

In June 2015, Oil and Natural Gas Corporation (ONGC) gave a ₹27 billion (US$420.88 million) offshore contract for the Bassein development project to Larsen & Toubro (L&T).

In February 2016, the board of ONGC approved an investment of ₹50.5 billion (US$751.54 million) in Tripura for drilling of wells and creation of surface facilities to produce 5.1 million standard cubic feet per day gas from the state's fields.

On 19 July 2017, the Government of India approved the acquisition of Hindustan Petroleum Corporation by ONGC.

According to reports, ONGC's oil production decreased from 20.80 million tonnes in the fiscal year 2018 to 16.88 million tonnes during the April–February period of the fiscal year 2022–23.

In the year 2023, ONGC made an announcement stating its plans to invest a large sum of money in the exploration of deepwater and ultra-deepwater, despite the ongoing decrease in the company's production of oil and gas.

In May 2023, ONGC announced that it would start its oil production in the Krishna Godavari Basin by June and appointed Manish Patil as its director of human resources.

== Operations ==
ONGC's operations include conventional exploration and production, refining and progressive development of alternative energy sources like coal-bed methane and shale gas. The company's domestic operations are structured around 11 assets (predominantly oil and gas producing properties), 7 basins (exploratory properties), 2 plants (at Hazira and Uran) and services (for necessary inputs and support such as drilling, geo-physical, logging and well services).

=== Subsidiaries ===
ONGC Videsh Limited (OVL) is the international arm of ONGC. It was rechristened on 15 June 1989. The primary business of ONGC Videsh is to prospect for oil and gas acreages outside India, including exploration, development and production of oil and gas. It currently has 38 projects across 17 countries. Its oil and gas production reached 8.87 MMT of O+oEG in 2010, up from 0.252 MMT of O+OEG in 2002/03. ONGC holds 100% stake in ONGC Videsh Limited.

Hindustan Petroleum Corporation Limited (HPCL) is an Indian state-owned oil and natural gas company with its headquarters at Mumbai, Maharashtra. It has about 25% market-share in India among public-sector companies (PSUs) and a strong marketing infrastructure. Oil and Natural Gas Corporation owns 51.11% shares in HPCL and others are distributed amongst financial institutes, public and other investors. The company is ranked 367th on the Fortune Global 500 list of the world's biggest corporations as of 2016. Prior to ONGC acquiring majority stake in HPCL, the former was not in the list of Fortune Global 500 while the latter HPCL was.

Presence of ONGC Videsh Limited (OVL) in Latin America:

- Brazil (Block BC-10, BM-SEAL-4, BM-BAR-1, BM-ES-42, BM-S-73 & S-74)
- Colombia (CPO-5 & Manasarovar Energy)
- Cuba (Block N-25, N-26, N-27, N-28, N-29 N-34, N-35 & N-36 Block)
- Venezuela (Block San Cristobal, Block Carabobo-1)

Presence of ONGC Videsh Limited (OVL) in CIS:

- Russia (Sakhalin‑1 – OVL 20% participating interest; retained stake after ExxonMobil’s 2022 exit and restructuring under Rosneft-led Sakhalin‑1 LLC; other onshore stakes include Vankorneft and Taas-Yuryakh joint ventures)
- Kazakhstan (Satpayev Exploration Block)

Presence of ONGC Videsh Limited (OVL) in Southeast Asia;

- Vietnam (Block 06.1 – producing, operator Zarubezhneft; Block 128 – exploration, no commercial discovery with contract continuously renewed because of geopolitical rivalry with China)
- Myanmar (Blocks A-1, A-3, B-2, EP-3, Pipeco-1, Pipeco-2) – OVL acquired 17% Participating Interest (PI) in January 2002 in A1 and March 2006 in A3 block.

Presence of ONGC Videsh Limited (OVL) in Africa:

- Libya: Block NC-189, 81–1, Contract Area 43
- Mozambique: Rovuma Area-1 Offshore
- South Sudan: GNOP/GNPOC/GPOC - Blocks 1, 2 and 4, SPOC - Block 5A, and Pipeline- Khartoum-Port project

Presence of ONGC Videsh Limited (OVL) in the Middle East:

- Iran: Block Farsi
- Iraq: Block-8 (renamed as Block-20)
- Syria: Al Furat Production Company (AFPC) and Block-24
- UAE: Lower Zakum Concession

Mangalore Refinery and Petrochemicals Limited is an oil refinery at Mangalore. MRPL has a design capacity to process 15 million tonnes per annum and has two hydrocrackers producing premium diesel (high cetane). It also has 2 CCRs producing unleaded petrol of high octane.

ONGC Mangalore Petrochemicals Limited (OMPL) is an Indian company promoted by Oil and Natural Gas Corporation (ONGC) and Mangalore Refinery and Petrochemicals Limited (MRPL). Both ONGC and MRPL hold respectively 49% and 51% stake in the company. OMPL is a subsidiary company of MRPL and also a PSU behalf of share pattern of OMPL. It was incorporated on 19 December 2006. The OMPL complex spans 442 acres of land in Mangalore Special Economic Zone (SEZ). The project cost was estimated at ₹57.5 billion (US$600 million). The complex is connected with MRPL Refinery, from where they feed to the complex is supplied. It is 14 kilometres (8.7 mi) away from the New Mangalore Port and about 15 kilometres (9.3 mi) from Mangalore International Airport.

==== ONGC sports ====
ONGC has held many sports teams, such as athletics, badminton, basketball, boxing, chess, cricket, cue sports, carrom, field hockey, football, kabaddi, shooting, table tennis, tennis, volleyball and wrestling. Its football team, ONGC F.C., once played in Indian I-League.

The basketball team, in particular, is known internationally since several of the players of India's national basketball team have played there. These players include Vishesh Bhriguvanshi, Amritpal Singh, and Yadwinder Singh.

=== Joint ventures ===
==== ONGC Tripura Power Company ====
ONGC Tripura Power Company (OTPC) is a joint venture which was formed in September 2008 between ONGC, Infrastructure Leasing and Financial Services Limited and the government of Tripura. It has developed a 726.6 MW CCGT thermal power generation project at Palatana in Tripura which supply electricity to the power deficit areas of the northeastern states of the country. OTPC has 2 no 9FA machines supplied by GE USA.

==== ONGC Petro Additions Limited ====
ONGC Petro additions Limited (OPaL), a multi-billion joint venture company was incorporated in 2006, as a public limited company under the Companies Act, 1956, promoted by ONGCGas Authority of India Limited (GAIL), and Gujarat State Petroleum Corporation (GSPC). ONGC owns 49.36% of shares in OPaL, while GAIL has 49.21% per cent and the remaining 1.43% per cent is held by GSPC.

It's ONGC Petro Additions Dahej Complex at Dahej, Gujarat in PCPIR/SEZ began its operation after the inauguration by Prime Minister Narendra Modi in March 2017. The complex, covering 585 hectares (1,446 acres), was founded in 2006 through a collaboration involving the ONGC, Gas Authority of India Limited (GAIL), and Gujarat State Petroleum Corporation (GSPC). Construction commenced in 2008, and the complex was officially commissioned in 2017 by Prime Minister Narendra Modi. The project involved an investment of around ₹300 billion (US$4.61 billion) and is part of India's first Petroleum, Chemicals and Petrochemicals Investment Region.

As of 2023, it has an annual production capacity of 1.5 million tons of polymers (1,100 KTPA Ethylene, 400 KTPA Propylene), along with 0.5 million tons of various other petrochemical products using associated units like the pyrolysis gasoline hydrogenation unit, butadiene extraction unit, and benzene extraction unit.

=== Training institutes ===
- Institute of Petroleum Safety, Health and Environment Management, Goa

== Products and services ==
ONGC supplies crude oil, natural gas, and value-added products to major Indian oil and gas refining and marketing companies. Its primary products crude oil and natural gas are for the Indian market.

Product-wise revenue breakup for FY 2016–17
Product	Revenue (₹ billion)
Crude oil	562.38
Gas	168.88
LPG	31.48
Naphtha	76.80
C2-C3	13.44
SKO	3.69
Others	1.59
Adjustments	−32.74
Total	825.52

== Listings and shareholding ==
The equity shares of ONGC are listed on the Bombay Stock Exchange, where it is a constituent of the BSE SENSEX index, and the National Stock Exchange of India, where it is a constituent of the S&P CNX Nifty.

As of 31 March 2013, Government of India held around 69% equity shares in ONGC. Over 480,000 individual shareholders hold approx. 1.65% of its shares. Life Insurance Corporation of India is the largest non-promoter shareholder in the company with 7.75% shareholding.

Shareholders (as on 31 March 2013)	Shareholding
Promoter – Government of India	68.94%
Government companies	10.09%
Banks, financial inst. & insurance companies	09.69%
Foreign institutional investors (FII)	06.27%
Private corporate bodies	01.83%
Individual shareholders	01.65%
Mutual funds and UTI	01.13%
NRI/employees	00.11%
Total	100.0%

== Employees ==
As of 31 March 2024, the company has 25,847 employees, out of which 2,043 are women (7.9%).

== Awards and recognitions ==
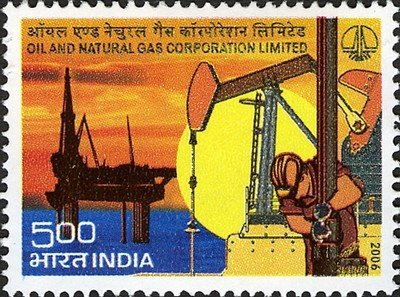
Stamp of India 2006 Oil and Natural Gas Corporation Limited

- ONGC is the top employer in the energy sector in India, in the Randstad Awards 2013.
- ONGC was one of 12 winners of the 'Golden Peacock Award 2014' for its corporate social responsibility practices, and one of 24 winners of the 'Golden Peacock Award 2013' in the occupational safety and health category.
- In April 2013, it was ranked at 155th place in the Forbes Global 2000 for 2012.
- In 2011, ONGC was ranked 39th among the world's 105 largest listed companies in 'transparency in corporate reporting' by Transparency International making it the most transparent company in India.
- It was conferred with 'Maharatna' status by the Government of India in November 2010. The Maharatna status to select PSUs allows more freedom in decision making.
- In February 2014, FICCI conferred it with Best Company Promoting Sports Award.
- ONGC won the "Greentech Excellence Award" for 2013 in Platinum Category.
- ONGC was ranked 82nd among India's most trusted brands according to the Brand Trust Report 2012, a study conducted by Trust Research Advisory. In the Brand Trust Report 2013, ONGC was ranked 191st among India's most trusted brands and subsequently, according to the Brand Trust Report 2014, ONGC was ranked 370th among India's most trusted brands.
- ONGC is the title sponsor for the first edition of the Corporate social responsibility (CSR) Award organised by Amar Ujala.

== Controversies ==
Despite being owned by the government of India, ONGC has repeatedly been found not claiming its rightful payments from private players, especially for the use of oil fields, oil rigs and concessions.

ONGC was owed ₹920 billion (US$13.69 billion) from Reliance Industries Limited (Petrochemicals) for the use of blocks of oil fields. This was highlighted by the Comptroller and Auditor General of India (CAG), the overseer of expenditures of the Indian Government. However, as of 2018, this outstanding amount was still not paid by Reliance Industries Limited to ONGC.

On 21 April 2021, three employees (Mohini Mohan Gogoi, Alakesh Saikia, Retul Saikia) of the ONGC were allegedly abducted from Lakuwa field of Assam's Sivasagar district. Authorities suspect that the banned United Liberation Front of Asom (Independent) is behind the abduction.

Oil and Natural Gas Corporation (ONGC) has faced criticism for maintaining business operations in Russia despite international sanctions imposed following Russia's invasion of Ukraine in 2022. The company continued to sell Russian Sokol crude oil to Indian refiners, drawing concerns over its role in supporting Russia's energy sector. ONGC has been listed on platforms like Leave Russia, which tracks companies still engaged in the Russian market, raising questions about its alignment with global economic sanctions and ethical considerations.

== See also ==
- ONGC FC
- List of companies of India
- List of largest companies by revenue
- List of corporations by market capitalisation
- Make in India
- Forbes Global 2000
- Fortune India 500
- Indian Institute of Technology (Indian School of Mines), Dhanbad
- Rajiv Gandhi Institute of Petroleum Technology
