= 300 club =

300 club may refer to:

- 300 Club, group of people who have experience a temperature difference of 300 °F
- List of players who have played 300 NRL games
- List of players who have played 300 VFL/AFL games
- 300 strikeout club
- 300 save club
- 300-win club
