= Gordon G. Shepherd =

Canadian space scientist

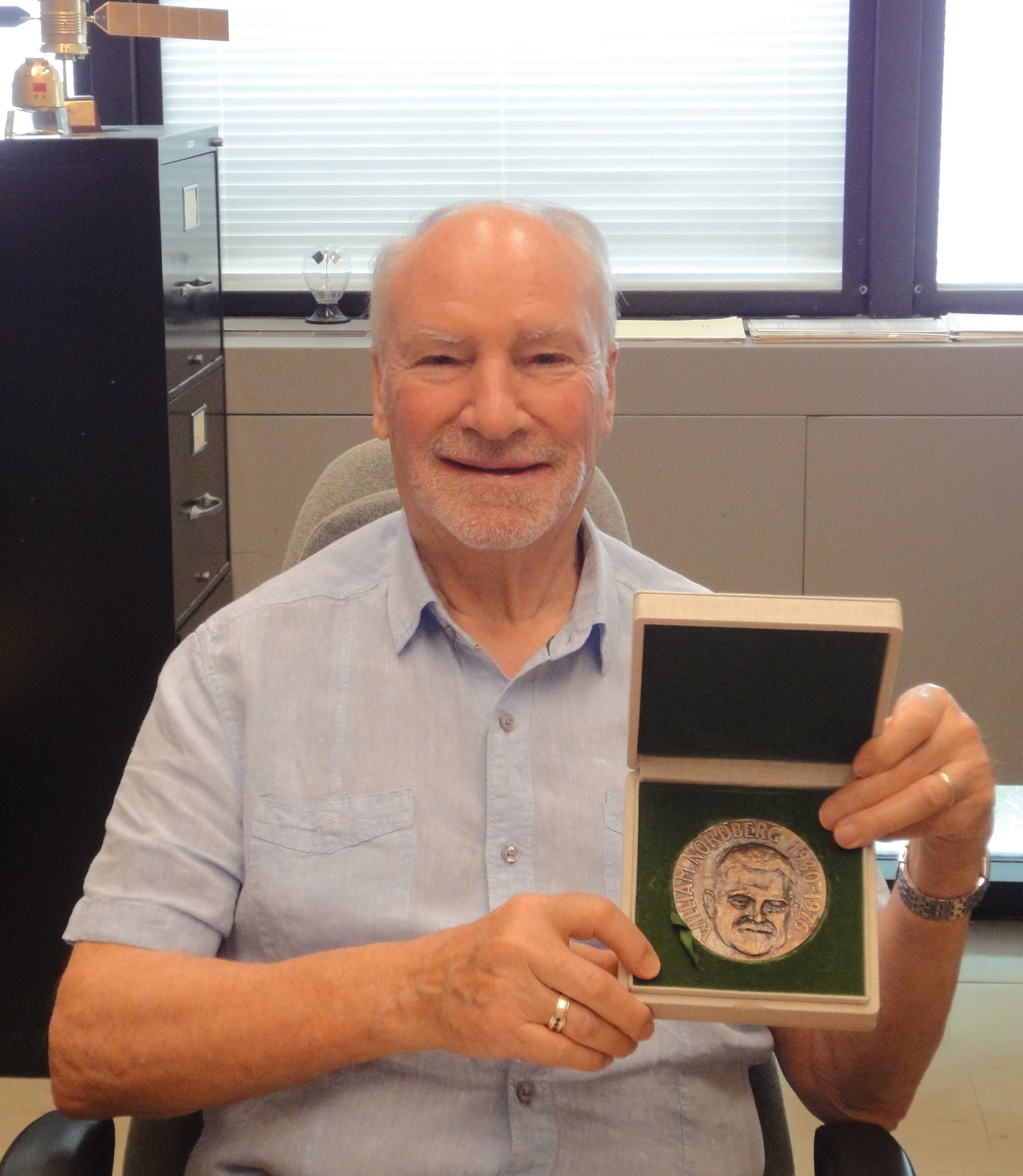
Gordon Shepherd with COSPAR medal

Gordon Greeley Shepherd is a Canadian space scientist, currently a Distinguished Research Professor Emeritus at York University.

== Education and career ==
Gordon Shepherd attended the University of Saskatchewan, where he was awarded a Bachelor of Engineering in Engineering Physics with great distinction in 1952. He continued graduate work there, obtaining an M.Sc. in Physics in 1953, supervised by Donald Hunten. He then moved to the University of Toronto where he obtained his Ph.D. in Physics in 1956, supervised by Harry Welsh. Following his Ph.D., he was appointed Assistant Professor of Physics at the University of Saskatchewan in 1957, becoming Associate Professor in 1964. In 1969 he moved to York University in Toronto as Full Professor, becoming Distinguished Research Professor in 1993, and serving as Director of the Centre for Research in Earth and Space Science from 1995 to 2009.

== Research ==
Professor Shepherd began his research with studies of the aurora borealis, conceiving new instruments for its observation. The implementation was done by his students, postdocs and research associates of which not all can be mentioned here. These began with the Fabry-Perot Interferometer (John Nilson, Leroy Cogger, Steven Peteherych). The most notable was introducing “field-widening” to the Michelson interferometer (Ronald Hilliard, Harold Zwick) and operating it by scanning over a single fringe to obtain atmospheric temperatures from both aurora and airglow. His ground-based observations (Robert Peterson, Kenneth Paulson) were later extended to measurements from rockets (John Miller, Ashley Deans), flown from the Churchill Research Range at Churchill, Manitoba and Cape Parry on the Arctic coastline. He then moved to satellite measurements with the Red Line Photometer (RLP) on the Canadian ISIS-II satellite (Frank Bunn, Frank Thirkettle), launched in 1971. This instrument mapped the auroral O(1D) red line emission, produced by low energy electrons, specifically in the dayside cusp. A wide-angle Michelson interferometer was then conceived for the measurement of winds from space, called the Wind Imaging Interferometer (WINDII), launched on NASA’s Upper Atmosphere Research Satellite (UARS) (William Gault, Brian Solheim, Charles Hersom, Yves Rochon) in 1991. It operated until 2003, providing new information on the dramatic influence of winds on processes in the upper atmosphere through migrating and non-migrating tides and planetary waves (Charles McLandress, Shengpan Zhang), (Guiping Liu, Young-Min Cho). Other versions of the field-widened instrument were developed, the Polarizing Atmospheric Michelson Interferometer and the Spatial Heterodyne Spectrometer (John Bird, Stephen Brown). More recently, the superposition of these zonal waves was proposed for the existence of “bright nights”, a phenomenon known since Roman times of rare nights which were not dark, but exceptionally bright. WINDII data were most recently used to describe the existence of a high-latitude “wind wall”, with reversals of zonal wind from eastward to westward with velocities of up to 600 meters/second (Marianna Shepherd).

== Awards and honours ==
Shepherd became a Fellow of the Royal Society of Canada in 1981, a Fellow of the Canadian Aeronautics and Space Institute in 1981, was a Killam Fellow from 1991–93, received a Vikram Sarabhai Professorship from the Physical Research Laboratory, India, in 1998, became a Fellow of the American Geophysical Union in 1999, received the Canadian Space Agency John H. Chapman Award of Excellence in 2003 and the Canadian Aeronautics and Space Institute Alouette Award in 2004. He received the SCOSTEP Distinguished Research Scientist award in 2014 and the COSPAR William Nordberg Medal in 2016.
