= John Bird (scientist) =

Canadian engineer

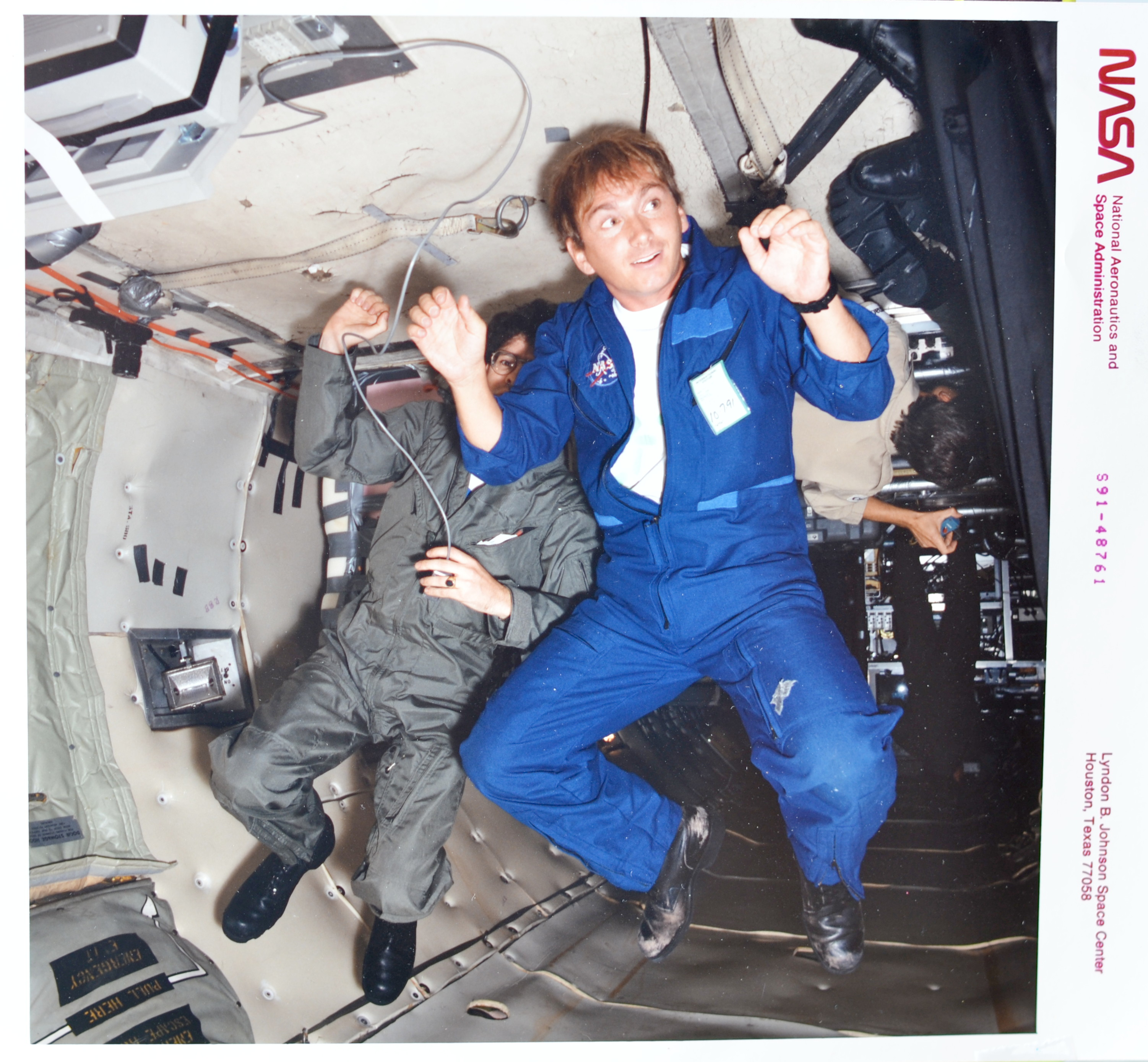
Dr. John Bird floating in NASA's KC-135 aircraft to perform experiments in 0g.

John Clifford Bird (born April 4, 1955) is a Canadian engineer, scientist, and journalist. Bird’s research has included laser physics, atmospheric physics, and materials in microgravity. He broke the world altitude record for hang gliding by launching from a helium balloon at 35,000 ft, and spent a year at the Amundsen–Scott South Pole Station, which was documented in his book One Day, One Night: Portraits of the South Pole.

== Early career ==
Bird’s career started as the youngest NASA-accredited journalist covering the Apollo 13 launch. and is the author of The Upper Atmosphere: Threshold of Space. Bird broke the world altitude record for hang gliding by piloting a hang glider from a helium balloon at 35,000’. Bird competed in Ironman Canada, and Ironman USA.

== Education ==
Bird began his Ph.D. at NASA Marshall Space Flight Center, studying the aurora. He went on to study the atmosphere with wide angle interferometers at York University under Gordon G. Shepherd, where he was awarded a Ph.D. for developing a polarizing version of an optical interferometer. The Polarizing Atmospheric Michelson Interferometer, PAMI, developed by Bird et al., was discussed in Spectral Imaging of the Atmosphere. It employs a polarization tuning technique with no internal moving parts, instead scanning with a polarizer external to the interferometer. The PAMI was demonstrated in an observation campaign where its performance was compared to a Fabry–Perot spectrometer, and employed to measure E-region winds. He attended the International Space University in Strasbourg, France. During post-doctoral studies with the University of Waterloo, Bird trained with the astronauts in zero-g aircraft to investigate laser interactions with materials in zero-gravity.

== Scientific research ==
Bird went on to study the arctic atmosphere with a LIDAR system including measurements of aerosols, chlorine monoxide, and ozone. as well as gravity waves, and ozone structures.

He was selected to spend a year at the Amundsen–Scott South Pole station, to study the aurora and upper atmosphere. Bird’s South Pole Pendulum Project (as discussed in The New York Times and excerpted from Seven Tales of the Pendulum) “is probably the closest ever made to one of the earth's poles. The pendulum was erected in a six-story staircase of a new station that was under construction near the pole. The new station offered an ideal venue for the Foucault pendulum; its height ensured an accurate result, no moving air could disturb it, and low air pressure reduced air resistance. The researchers confirmed about 24 hours as the rotation period of the plane of oscillation.”

His Antarctica adventures were documented in his book, One Day, One Night: Portraits of the South Pole, which won honorable mention for nonfiction at the 2016 New York Book Festival, and was a finalist at the 2017 Next Generation Indie Book Awards. The book was reviewed by Parade.

Bird spoke at the 2016 global climate summit, COP22, in Marrakech, Morocco, and discussed climate change and extreme weather with Jesse Ventura on Ventura’s television show.
