= 300 Club =

People who endured a temperature change of 300 °F (167 °C)

The 300 Club is the term for a small number of individuals who have experienced a temperature difference of 300 °F (167 °C) within minutes. The group originated at Amundsen-Scott South Pole Station in Antarctica and has since been established in North America.

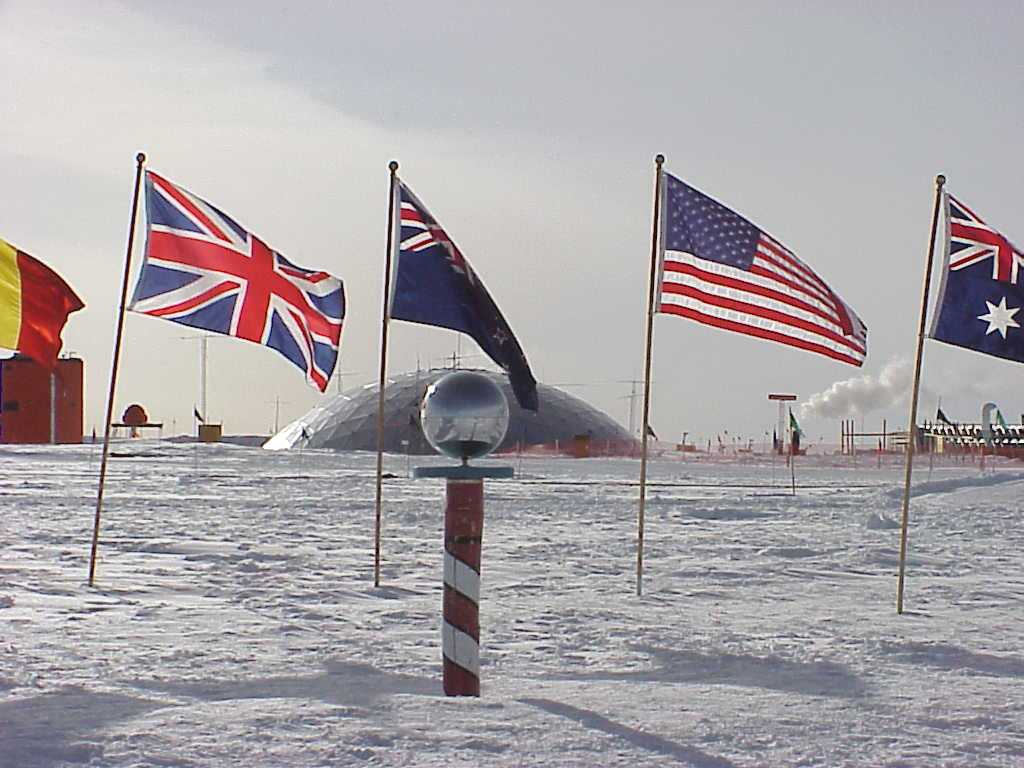
The Ceremonial South Pole. 300 Club participants walk briskly from the Amundsen-Scott station to this marker, circle it, and then return to the station wearing only boots.

Participants in the Antarctic 300 Club wait for a winter day when the temperature drops to −100 °F (−73 °C). This can happen in April to September (see South Pole). Because such cold temperatures may last only minutes, interested parties have to prepare in advance and be ready to act quickly. 300 Club participants spend up to 10 minutes in a sauna heated to 200 °F (93 °C). Then they quickly walk naked to the Ceremonial South Pole wearing only boots. They walk around the marker and return to the station. Participants move fast enough to minimize frostbite, but not so fast that they inhale so much cold air that they freeze their airway and lungs; properly clothed bystanders are often present to provide help if needed. After this, participants usually warm up in the sauna again, often with the aid of alcoholic beverages. After joining the 300 Club, members are entitled to wear commemorative patches.

The first 300 Club outside of Antarctica was established on January 30, 2019 near Minneapolis, Minnesota during a polar vortex. With an outside temperature of −27 °F (−33 °C), three men heated their backyard sauna to 280 °F (138 °C) and sat inside for 10 minutes. Upon exiting the sauna, they sprinted around a flagpole planted in honor of the South Pole tradition and took a brief roll in the snow before returning to the sauna.

== In popular culture ==
Dr. John Bird's award-winning book, One Day, One Night: Portraits of the South Pole chronicles life and science at the station, including the 300 Club.

In the 2006 film Eight Below, Jerry and Coop attempt amateur work at gaining the right to join the 300 Club, while working as researchers in Antarctica. By the time the film ends, though, the best record they've broken, towards this end, is a difference of 150 degrees Fahrenheit. Rosie, a fellow researcher, promises to make breakfast for them if they ever break the 300 record.

== The 200 Club ==
Another version, called 200 Club exists at the Russian Vostok Station located at the Pole of Cold where temperatures regularly reach as low as −80 °C (−112 °F). To join the club one must first endure the heat of the sauna at 120 °C (248 °F) and then spend at least 200 seconds outside the station at −80 °C. The number 200 refers to the temperature variation in Celsius.

== See also ==
- Polar bear plunge
- Line-crossing ceremony
