= Ferry tank =

Auxiliary fuel container for aircraft or other vehicle

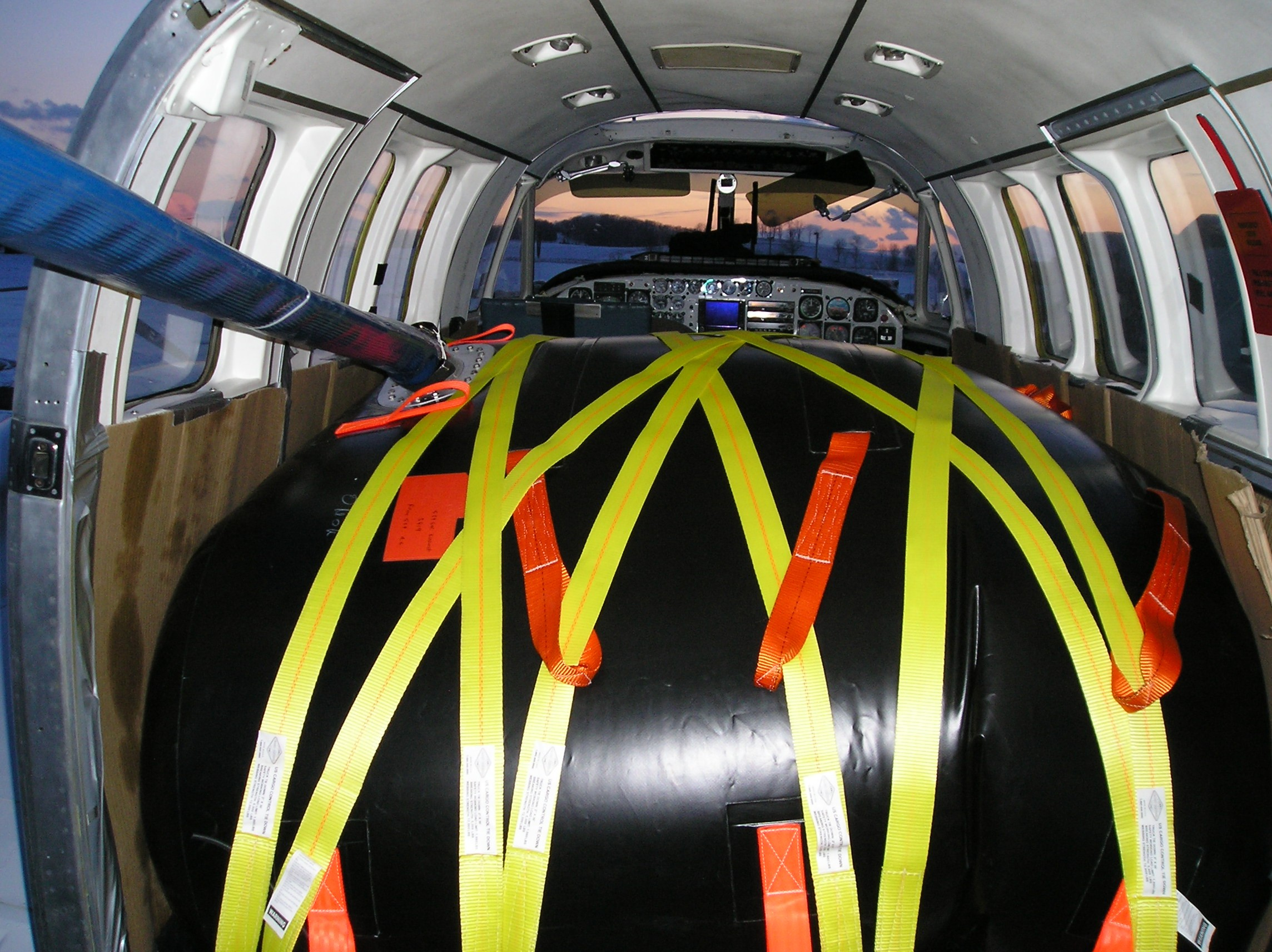
Ferry 529 ferry tank full in King Air

A ferry tank is an auxiliary fuel container that is usually temporarily attached to a motorized device which it then supplies fuel. A ferry tank allows the range or endurance of the vehicle or aircraft to be extended. Ferry tanks are typically used in both civil and military aviation; civil aviation and transport aircraft tend to use internal tanks while combat aircraft will use external tanks.

In aviation, ferry tanks allow aircraft additional range to reach destinations beyond the aircraft's specified range when there are no available re-fueling stopover locations. For example, for an aircraft with only 1,000 miles range to be delivered from North America to Hawaii, which is over 2,000 miles away, the aircraft will require a ferry tank to supply it with enough fuel to travel the excess miles.

== History ==
The first ferry tanks were drop tanks that fit externally on the aircraft and were used primarily by the military, allowing combat aircraft to both travel longer distances and remain in combat longer, giving advantages to air forces that utilized them on their planes. But they also made the planes vulnerable to small arms fire.

== Design ==
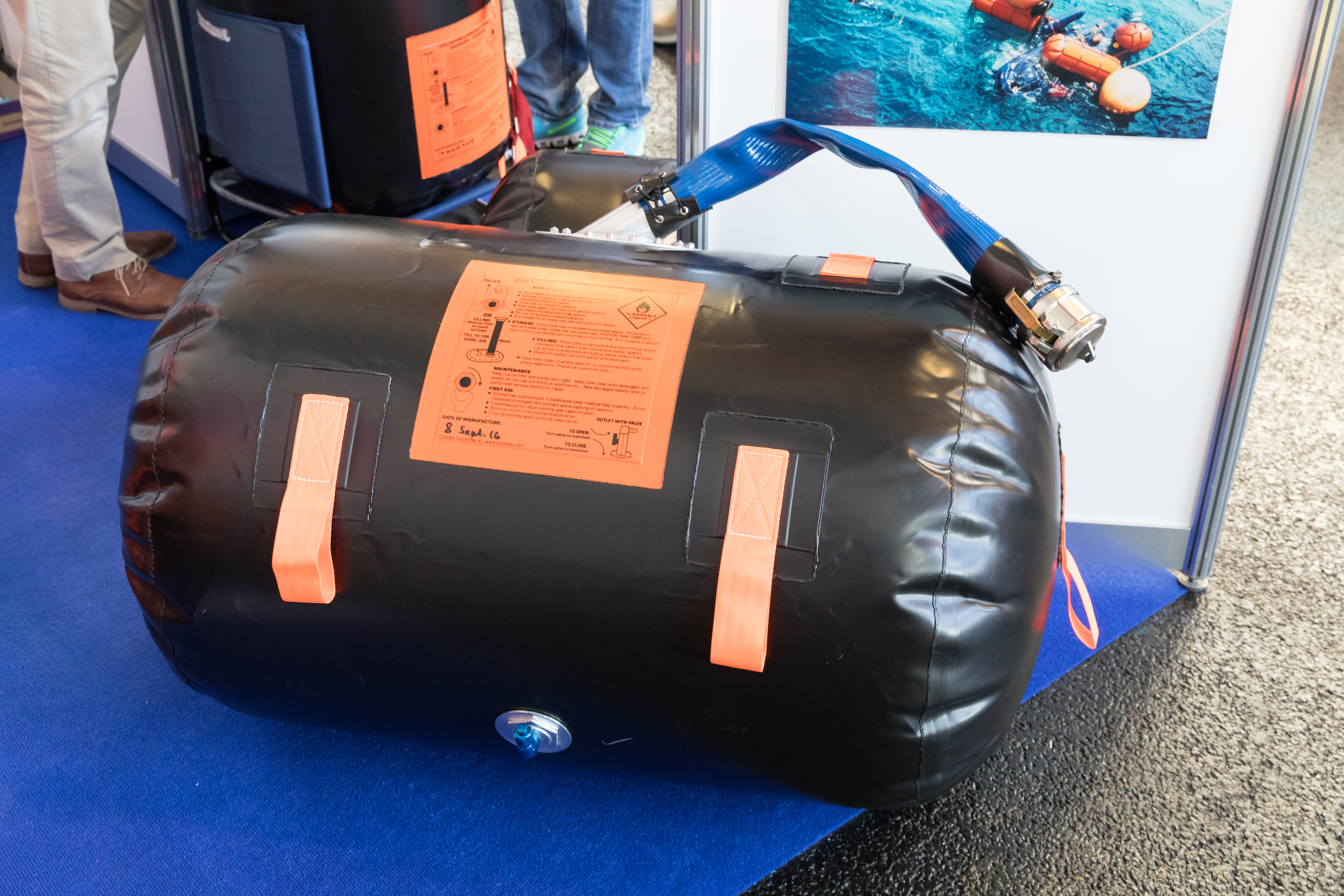
Turtle-Pac collapsible ferry tank

Military forces often utilize external ferry tanks, allowing aircraft to travel greater distance or remain in combat longer. For example, external ferry tanks made possible the Israeli Air Force raid on the Osirak nuclear reactor known as Operation Opera.

The external tanks refill the main tank as it is depleted. Empty external tanks may be dumped in flight, known as drop tanks, or may be retained.

== See also ==
- Ferry flying
