= Nchanga Copper mine =

Copper mine in Copperbelt, Zambia

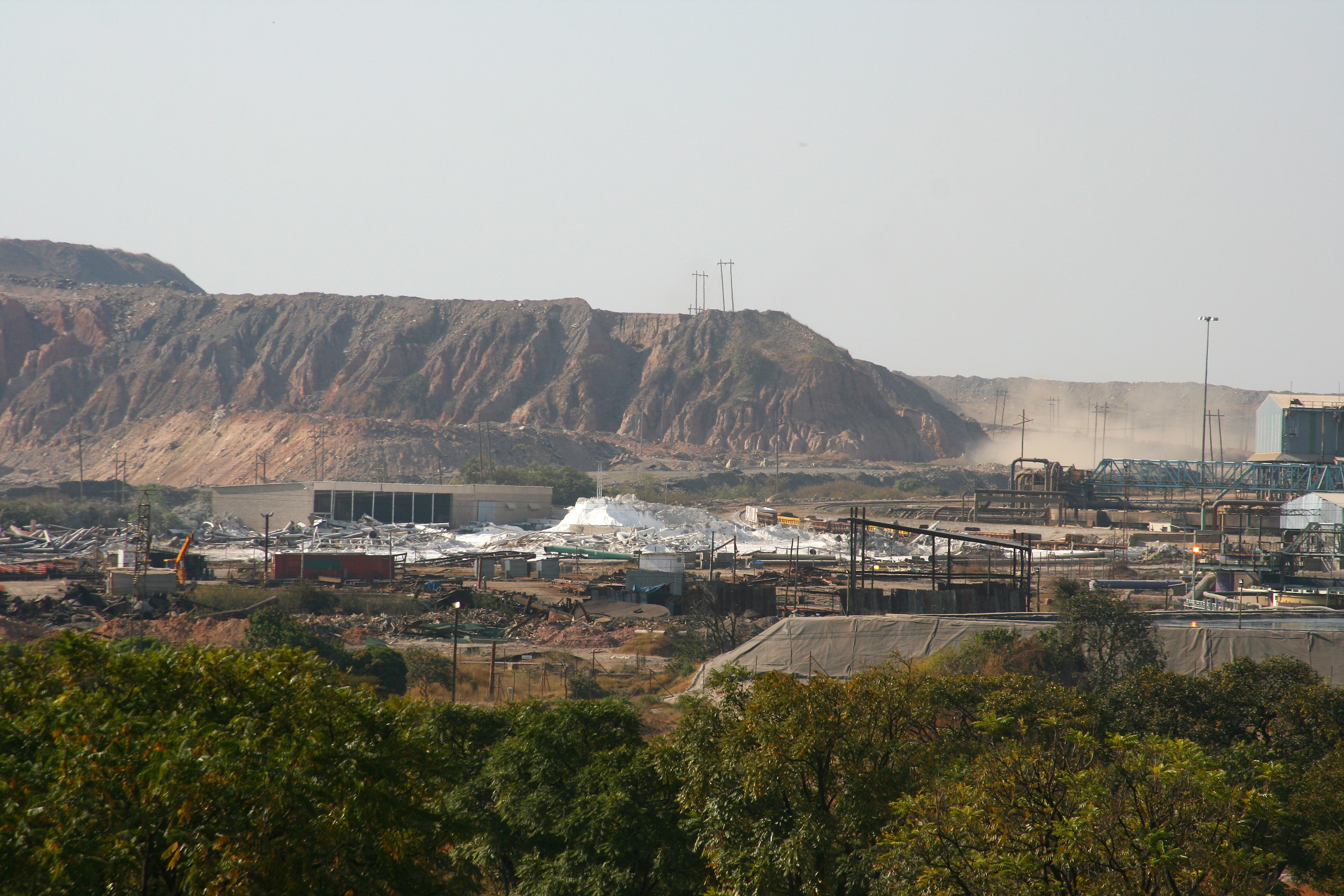
- The mine in 2008

- Location in Zambia
- Location: Chingola,Copperbelt Province,Zambia; 12°31′S 27°51′E,
- Products: Copper, cobalt
- Type: Underground and open-pit
- Company: Konkola Copper Mines
- Website: kcm.co.zm/our-operations/minin

Local impacts
- Pollution: Sulfuric acid and Copper sulfate
- Impacted: Kafue river

Conflict
- Contested by: local villagers
- Lawsuit(s): domestic lawsuit in 2011, and Lungowe v Vedanta Resources plc in England (2015)

Nchanga Copper mine, previously the Chingola Copper mine, is an underground and open-pit cobalt and copper mine in Chingola, in the Copperbelt Province of Zambia. It is the largest copper mine in Africa. It is owned by the Konkola Copper Mines, a joint venture between Vedanta Resources and the state mining company of Zambia (ZCCM Investments Holdings).

Pollution from the mine contaminated water sources for thousands of nearby villagers who had no other source of water, resulting in health problems. The villagers also reported that the pollution had damaged farmland and reduced crop yields. One thousand eight hundred villagers filed a class-action lawsuit (Lungowe v Vedanta Resources plc) against Vedanta Resources in London in 2015. The case went to the British Supreme Court and had broader implications for British multinational resource extraction companies conducting business abroad.

== Description and ownership ==
Nchanga Copper mine is a cobalt and copper producing mine in Chingola, in the Copperbelt Province of Zambia. It is owned by Konkola Copper Mines, a joint venture between the British Vedanta Resources and the state mining company of Zambia.

The mine is the largest copper mine in Africa. Operations take place both in an open-pit and underground. The pit is over four miles long, one mile wide, and 1,600 feet deep. The site has a mine, a smelting plant, a refinery, and a 300-foot high pile of tailings.

== History ==
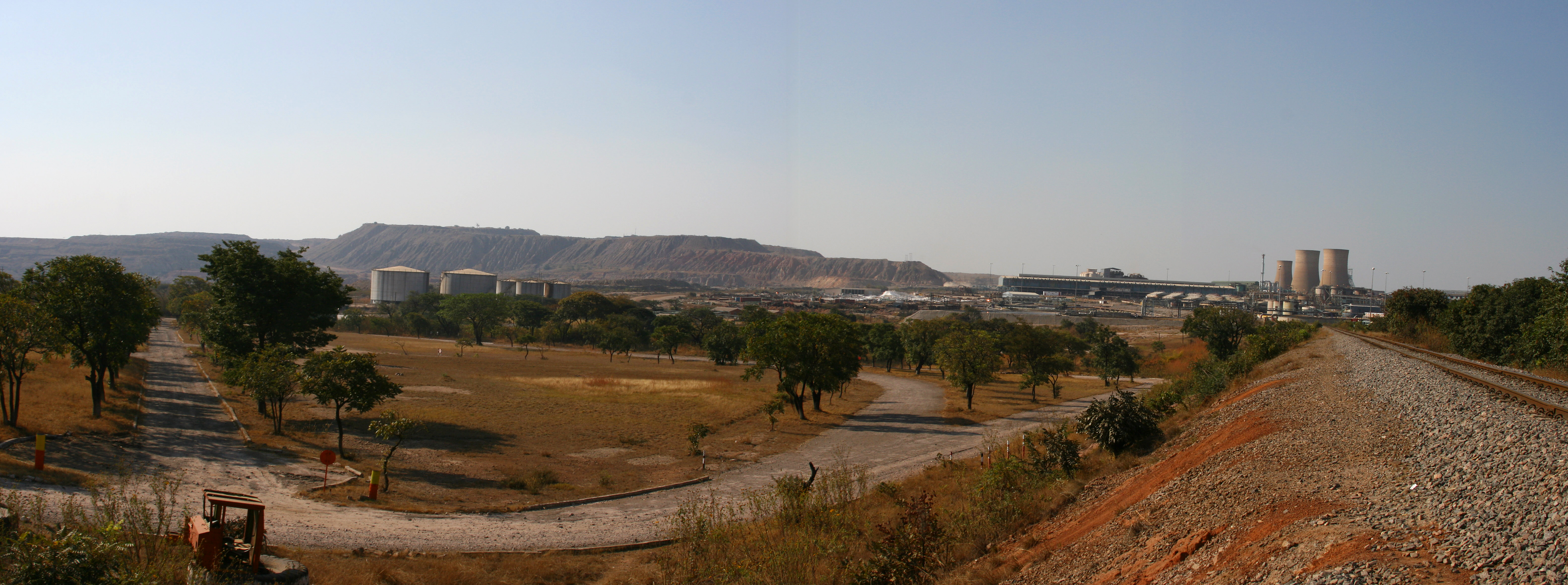
The mine in 2008

In 2011, the Lusaka High Court required £1.3 million of damages to be paid to Chingola residents, compensation for sulphuric acid contamination of the Kafue River in 2006. In 2014, the mine made £320 million of profit.

In 2015, 2,500 people from the communities of Hippo Pool, Kakosa, Shimulala and Hellen alleged that the mine had again polluted the Mushishima stream and Kafue River. The BBC reported seeing leaked documentation verifying spillage of sulphuric acid and other toxic chemicals polluting water sources belonging to people living near the mine. The whistle-blower, who worked for 15 years with KCM, alleges that since Vedanta bought the mine in 2004, corners have been cut to save the costs of running operations.

Without admitting legal liability, Vendanta Resources agreed to an undisclosed financial settlement in 2021.

In 2020, the mine's owners advised that the rainfall was causing the imminent collapse of part of the mine. The area at risk represented a 350 metre length of the edge of the pit, with 20 million tonnes of material expected to fall.

=== Environmental impact ===
In 2006, local farmers and fisherman reported that spillage of copper sulphate turned the Kafue river bright blue and that 40,000 people were affected by poisoned water.

In 2015, the mine polluted farmland in a village near the mine with copper sulfate, contaminating the only source of drinking water for the local school. Contamination gave the water an "overpowering" foul smell and turned it bright orange. Villagers reported that their crops were dying and they were suffering from health problems such as paralysis.

== Nchanga open-pit mine ==
The open pits at Nchanga Mine are situated in a crescent-shaped structure 11 km long around the municipal town of Chingola in Zambia. Covering nearly 30 km^{2}, it is the second largest open-cast mine in the world. The deepest part of the pit is 400 m lower than the surrounding plateau.

Open-pit mining at Nchanga started in 1955, in the main Nchanga open pit. Subsequently, nine medium-sized open pits, called satellite pits, have also been mined at one time or the other.

At present, mining is concentrated on the main Nchanga pit, with satellite planned for future extensions, as economics and processing technological developments unfold. Together they are termed generically as the Nchanga Open Pits.

== Nchanga underground mine ==
The Nchanga underground mine accounts for approximately 45% of the total copper production at Nchanga. Over the past 10 years the annual production has averaged 93,00 tonnes of contained copper. Currently, there are three distinct ore bodies from which mining is taking place, namely, the lower orebody (LOB), Block `A' and Chingola `B'. These contribute 63%, 35% and 8% copper ore production respectively.

== Nchanga process plants ==
The Nchanga processing plants consist of two concentrators, East Mill and West Mill and the tailings leach plant.

The East Mill treats ore from the open pit while the West Mill treats ore from underground. In addition cobalt is treated at the West Mill Cobalt Plant. The tailings leach plant produces copper cathodes from concentrator tailings and reclaimed tailings.

== See also ==
- Copperbelt (region in Central Africa)
- Katanga Supergroup (geological formation)
