= Vedanta University =

Proposed Vedanta University Project
- Type: Proposed Private
- Endowment: Unverified endowment numbers
- Administrative staff: None
- Students: None
- Location: Konark, Odisha, India; 19.859804°N 85.934835°E
- Campus: Rural, 6,000 acres planned, not yet acquired
- Website: www.vedanta.edu.in

Vedanta is a proposed, private, multi-disciplinary, co-educational university to be started by Anil Agarwal of Vedanta Resources corporation near Puri-Konark highway, Odisha, India. In July 2009, the government of Odisha passed a landmark bill to allow this massive university to be set up and function with autonomy. According to news reports and as of September 2010, there were no clear plans regarding the establishment of this proposed University. However, in late April 2015 a revival of the project was initiated; The ex-Chief Secretary of Odisha, Mr. Bijay Patnaik, was hired as the President of the Vedanta University Project to revive this project.

== The vision ==
Anil Agarwal, an Indian businessman, who heads the London based Vedanta Resources corporation and Naveen Patnaik, the Chief Minister of Odisha state in eastern India, had signed a memorandum of understanding to create a world class, multidisciplinary university, Vedanta University. The university, which would be entirely a not-for-profit venture, was planned to be funded from Agarwal's personal funds. Sam Pitroda, the chairman of the Knowledge Commission was the choice of the first chancellor of Vedanta University. Recent reports also suggest that at least three Nobel laureates have been contracted to join the university.

== Academics and research ==

=== Schools and colleges ===
- Engineering
- Medicine
- Business
- Liberal Arts
- Sciences
- Law
- Performing Arts

=== Centers of excellence ===
- Health Sciences
- Manufacturing Sciences
- Agricultural Research
- Rural Economics
- Information & Communication Technology
- Pharmaceutical Research
- Urban Planning
- Nanotechnology
- Biotechnology

== Campus and township ==
The foundation has identified 6,000 acres (24 km^{2}) of land near the Puri-Konark marine drive between Nuanai and Balighai for the proposed Vedanta University. However the land acquisition for the university has hit a roadblock with the Supreme court ordering a status quo and hence the project has been stayed.

== Environmental violations ==
Several environmental violations were raised against the university resulting in multiple cases in the High court and the Supreme Court. In May 2010, Government of India asked the Anil Agarwal Foundation to stall the construction of the proposed Vedanta University at Puri to address issues related to environmental violations in the project.

== Controversies ==
An academic has questioned whether, given its location and size, Vedanta can achieve its aims of being a leading research university. A rejoinder on the matter was also published. Another criticism leveled at the Vedanta university by politicians, local academics, and the farmers currently occupying the proposed site relates to the relatively vast area of the proposed campus and its large student intake, although a few individual opinions differ.

=== Legal issues ===
==== High Court declares land acquisition for the university as illegal and void ====
On 16 November 2010, the Orissa High Court declared the land acquisition for the Rs 15,000-crore Vedanta University project in Puri town as illegal and void

==== Supreme Court - status quo on all land acquisition for Vedanta ====
A couple of months later, the Supreme court of India based in New Delhi ordered a stay or status Quo on all acquisition proceedings.

=== Abandonment of the project ===
It was claimed that when completed the world-class multi-disciplinary university over an area of 6,800 acres on Puri-Konark marine drive would be at par with Harvard and Oxford universities. The university, when fully operational, was to have an intake of 100,000 students with cutting-edge research facilities in 95 different academic disciplines. But local opposition and the problems over land acquisition led to the company abandoning the project. according to their statements. 26 out of the 30 staff posted on site had been since posted to other locations and the project is still described as "as good as over" according to a Vedanta official.

== Revival attempt starting 30 April 2015 ==
A revival of the project is being tried with the hiring of the ex-Chief Secretary of Odisha, Mr. Bijay Patnaik, as the President of the Vedanta University Project. He joined this position on 30 April 2015. He told TOI that his priority would be to expedite the decision in the supreme court case. Asked about potential conflict of interest, he said that such a question does not arise as the project he has joined has nothing to do with Vedanta as a company and he personally feels that the university is a desirable project that should take shape in the interest of Odisha. In an interview with Telegraph, he discusses more details on his task in reviving Vedanta University. He also gave an interview (in Odia) to OTV, a major cable channel in Odisha, where he addressed many questions that were raised by the media on this issue.

Some signs of a possible revival were earlier reported in September 2014 and December 2014. However, prior to that, in the previous years (2012, 2013), Anil Agarwal in some of his interviews did talk about his continuing interest in establishing Vedanta University. See for example:

The Supreme court of India on 28 November 2016 gave some positive indications that it may allow Vedanta University. The Chief Justice of the Supreme Court of India and a member of the bench hearing this case, Justice T.S. Thakur, is quoted to have said "Why should anyone oppose setting up of a world class university which will give opportunity to over one lakh students? If somebody is making an investment of Rs 2,500 crore in education, why should somebody oppose it? Students will benefit. Public would benefit." The Supreme Court bench seems to have suggested that the court may monitor the setting up of the university so as to make sure that the land is used for the university and not for commercial purposes. Following that, the promoter, Mr. Anil Agarwal, said to OTV in Bhubaneswar: "We will definitely go ahead with the plan to set up the university".

== See also ==
- Higher education in Orissa
- Nalanda University
