= Sterlite Copper =

Indian copper manufacturing company

Sterlite Industries (India) Limited
- Type: Subsidiary
- Industry: Metal, Mining
- Founded: September 8, 1975; 51 years ago, in Calcutta, India
- Successor: Sesa Sterlite Limited
- Area served: Worldwide
- Key people: Anil Agarwal (chairman)
- Revenue: ▲₹126.58 billion (2007-08)
- Number of employees: 1500
- Parent: Vedanta Limited

Sterlite Copper is a subsidiary of Sterlite industries, a company owned by Vedanta Limited.

== History ==
It was originally incorporated as Rainbow Investments in 1975, the name of the company was changed to Sterlite Cables in 1976. It was later renamed Sterlite Industries in 1986. With a restructuring in July 2000, the company is left with only a metal division comprising copper and aluminium divisions.

In 1994, it acquired Madras Aluminium Company (MALCO) for ₹55 crores. Sterlite and its associate companies took a 55% stake in India Foils for ₹50 crores. This improved Sterlite's product mix from aluminum to aluminum foil with the largest market share of 65%. In 1999, the company acquired Copper Mines of Tasmania.

In February 2011, Sterlite Industries acquired Lisheen Zinc Mine in Ireland from Taurus International S.A., for a share value of approximately $546 million. In September 2013, SESA Goa, Sterlite Industries and Vedanta Aluminium merged to form Sesa Sterlite Limited. It was listed on the NYSE in June 2007.

== Overview ==
In 1992, Maharashtra Industrial Development Corporation was allotted a plot in Ratnagiri district's Zadgaon village. On 13 December 1993, over 30,000 people of the city marched to the unit and demolished the quarters for the construction workers and some other structures. After that incident Sterlite was relocated to Thoothukudi.

Three state governments, Gujarat, Goa, and Maharashtra have refused permission to the Vedanta Group to set up its 40,000 tonnes capacity due to its high polluting nature of the Sterlite copper smelting plant before the company managed to convince the Tamil Nadu government. Since its commencement in 1997, the plant had been found on numerous occasions to flout the pollution norms with impunity and foregone permit requirements by pollution regulators, as observed by the courts.

Sterlite operated the largest copper smelter plant in India, in Thoothukudi from 1998 to 2018. The plant was not operational from March 2018 and was shut down by the Government of Tamil Nadu on 28 May 2018 after protests from locals. The plant also included a refinery, a phosphoric acid plant and a sulphuric acid plant. The company's main operating subsidiaries are Hindustan Zinc Limited for its zinc and lead operations; Copper Mines of Tasmania Pty Limited for its copper operations in Australia; and Bharat Aluminium Company Limited for its aluminium operations. It also operates a copper mine in Australia.

Sterlite copper operates a copper refinery and two copper rod plants in Silvassa, within the Union Territory of Daman & Diu.The refinery was completed in February 1996 but the smelter was not commissioned until October 1996.

== COVID-19 ==
In late April 2021, considering the COVID-19 situation and oxygen requirement, Sterlite Copper received special permission from the Government of Tamil Nadu to produce medical oxygen at their copper smelter plant in Thoothukudi, which was closed since 2018 after the state government's order. The company generated and despatched over 542.92 metric tonnes of liquid medical oxygen by June 2021 to help India deal with COVID-19. This is in addition to 953 oxygen cylinders containing 6671Nm³ of gaseous oxygen were supplied to meet the requirements of COVID-19 patients and hospitals. It also donated ₹5 crore (US$519,213) to the Government of Tamil Nadu Chief Minister's Public Relief Fund in April 2021.

== Financials ==
The company reported ₹1,055 crores as its operating profit in India in the financial year 2018. In FY20, it recorded an operating profit of negative ₹300 crores. It reported a loss in Ebitda of ₹235 crore and a revenue drop by 57% to ₹10,739 crore during the fiscal year 2018-19, compared to FY 2018-17, primarily due to the shutdown of Thoothukudi smelter in Tamil Nadu. In 2017-18, the company reported an Ebitda profit of ₹1,055 crore. The company's revenue was ₹24,951 crore in the FY18.

== Controversies ==
In 2001, Sterlite industries, BPL and Videocon were found guilty by SEBI of having colluded with Harshad Mehta and 17 brokers (10 from BSE and 7 from NSE) in a bid to corner shares and rig shares prices. This resulted in a ban on the company from accessing capital markets for 2 years. In 2003, Vedanta Resources (UK) was listed on the London Stock Exchange in the second largest floatation of the year in LSE. Vedanta Resources is a holding company that owns many entities including a large proportion of Vedanta Limited and Sterlite industries.

Vedanta Sterlite Copper Public Relations:

Vedanta Sterlite Copper, a major entity in the mining and metallurgy sector, collaborates with an official Public Relations agency to manage its public communications. The PR efforts are focused on providing accurate and transparent information to the public, stakeholders, and the wider community.

=== Thoothukudi violence ===
The Thoothukudi Copper Smelting plant has been long-opposed by the local residents for polluting their environment as well as causing a range of health problems and has been subject to several closures, on grounds of violating environmental norms.

The National Environmental Engineering Research Institute (NEERI) and the Tamil Nadu Pollution Control Board (TNPCB) found evidence that Sterlite contaminated the groundwater, air and soil with its effluents and also violated standards of operation.

In 2010, the Madras High Court had ordered a shut down of the same plant, for violating environmental regulations which was subsequently challenged by the group in the Supreme Court. The Supreme Court, in April, 2013 struck down the Madras high court's order and instead fined Sterlite Rs 100 crore for polluting the environment and for operating the plant without a renewal of the consents by TNPCB. Post a favorable ruling by the National Green Tribunal (NGT), the plant soon reopened.

In March 2013, TNPCB re-ordered a closure of the plant on grounds of leakage of gas, leading to nausea and skin irritation among local inhabitants.

The group has steadfastly denied accusations of any wrongdoing, throughout.

In March and April 2018, there were renewed mass-protests against the company's plans of setting up a second smelting complex and demands of an entire shutdown of the smelting plants, on grounds of violating environmental regulations were raised. On 22 May 2018 the protests took a deadlier when 20,000 protesters turned violent and subsequently police had to resort to lathi charge and shooting. In the event referred to as Thoothukudi violence 14 people were killed and several others injured. Section 144 was imposed to control the situation.

On 28 May 2018, the Government of Tamil Nadu ordered the permanent closure of Sterlite plant in Thoothukudi. This action of TN Government was set aside by NGT on 15 December 2018, directing the TNPCB to pass fresh order of renewal of consent and authorization to handle hazardous substances. Though the Supreme Court of India set aside these directions on appeal by TN Government, Justices Rohinton Fali Nariman and Navin Sinha held on 18 February 2019 that the NGT had no jurisdiction to entertain the matter. But the ADMK parties are given rights to approach the Madras High Court.

==== Aftermath and impact ====
On 28 October 2018, Tamil Nadu Pollution Control Board reported that the sulphur-dioxide levels in the air had reduced significantly after the Sterlite plant's closure. TNPCB also confirmed an improved Air Quality Index.

As it was classified as a red category, the district administration has maintained the smelter premises since its closure. On 22 March 2019, the company submitted an affidavit to the Madras High Court, claiming the damage of ₹100 crore (US$10 million), which was caused due to negligence in maintaining the premises by the district authorities.

Three years after closure of Sterlite, A 2022 study conducted by the Asian Institute of Technology, Bangkok and National Institute of Technology, Jamshedpur, indicated no significant change in the air quality and sulfur dioxide contribution to pollution in Thoothukudi before and after the closure of the smelter in 2018. While the closure of Sterlite caused immediate noticeable improvement in air quality by TNPCB, another study conducted by Anna University and the Centre for Climate Change and Adaptation Research confirmed that the road dust and vehicular emission as major factors contributing for the dust, causing poor air quality and make tuticorin already unsustainable .

In June 2019, Mint reported that the company faced a loss of about $200 million in profits ever since its copper smelter plant got closed. Around 20,000 people lost their jobs, who were employed by the company due to the shutting of the smelter and about 98,400 people were affected in the consumer or downstream industries. The plant's closure also caused a cascading effect on the supply chain of chemicals and the associated industries that operate using products of Sterlite Copper.

According to commerce ministry data, it impacted India's industrial metal exports and led to becoming a net importer beginning 2018-19. In March 2021, in a written response in the Lok Sabha, Pralhad Joshi, the Minister of Mines, Coal and Parliamentary Affairs, informed the lower house that the plant's closure has affected the domestic production of refined copper. The copper production of India dropped to 410,000 tonnes in 2019-20 from 830,000 tonnes in 2017-18 and the refined copper output in 2018-19 was 450,000 tonnes.

In 2021 and 2022, controversially it was also reported that petitions were filed by some villagers, fishermen and a few local organizations demanding the reopening of Sterlite Copper including the victims of police firing on anti-Sterlite protests.

While the Justice Aruna Jagadeesan Commission did not find any "direct evidence" that points to the involvement of either Sterlite Industries, as claimed by a few activist groups, or any outfit, as alleged by the then government and a few individuals such as actor Rajinikanth, in the violence of 22 May 2018, it is clear state government, three Tahsildars, 17 police personnel and the then District Collector, N Venkatesh co-ordinated inaction, lethargy, complacency and dereliction of duty.

== CSR ==
The company is engaged in various CSR activities, supporting health, education, environmental and humanitarian causes. In June 2019, the company supplied RO purified water to 1,400 families in 12 villages as part of the Muthucharam - Tamira Surabhi Project during the water crisis. It has launched Tamira Muthukkal, a project under the Muthucharam Initiative that provides skill training modules on various courses to help the youth of Thoothukudi to seek employment. It has also launched a skill center, offering courses and training in logistic trade. It runs a project called Ilam Mottukal, which works for the education of girl child in the Thoothukudi district and also runs a scholarship program called Sterlite Educational Scholarship. In December 2018, it announced to allocate ₹100 crore (US$10 million) to set up social infrastructure, including building a hospital and one million trees plantation in Thoothukudi, Tamil Nadu. Sterlite donated ₹5 crore (US$519,213) to the Chief Minister's Public Relief Fund during COVID-19 pandemic in April 2021.

== Awards and recognition ==
- In 2009, the company was named in the American Society for Quality (ASQ)'s International Team Excellence Awards finalists.
- In March 2011, the company awarded the Indian Merchants' Chamber's Ramkrishna Bajaj National Quality Award 2010 under the manufacturing category.
- It won FICCI Water Award by the Federation of Indian Chambers of Commerce & Industry and HSBC India in August 2012.
- In December 2012, Sterlite Copper won the Associated Chambers of Commerce and Industry of India (ASSOCHAM) appreciation award for its contribution in the field of CSR.
- In September 2013, the company won the Greentech Best Safety Practices award under the metals and mining category by the Greentech Foundation.
- In July 2016, it was awarded the Confederation of Indian Industries '4 Star Rating' Award in the CII Southern Region Environment, Health and Safety (EHS) Awards.
- In November 2016, Sterlite Copper won the National Award for Excellence in Water Management 2016 by the Confederation of Indian Industry.
- The company won the CII's Excellent Energy Efficient Unit award in the 18th National Energy Management Awards 2017 by the Confederation of Indian Industry in September 2017.
- In December 2017, it received the Future Ready Factory of the Year Award by the Federation of Indian Chambers of Commerce & Industry and Frost & Sullivan.
- In January 2018, it was awarded the British Safety Council's Sword of Honour Award 2017 with a 'Five Star Rating' in the preliminary evaluation.
