= Vedanta Limited =

Indian multinational mining company

- Type: Public
- Traded as: BSE: 500295; NSE: VEDL
- Industry: Mining
- Predecessor: Sesa Goa; Sesa Sterlite
- Founded: 1979; 47 years ago
- Headquarters: Mumbai, India
- Key people: Anil Agarwal (non-executive chairman); Sunil Duggal (CEO)
- Products: Zinc; Nickel; Cobalt; Copper
- Revenue: ▲₹1.77 trillion (US$18 billion) (2026)
- Operating income: ▲₹559.76 billion (US$5.8 billion) (2026)
- Net income: ▲₹250.96 billion (US$2.6 billion) (2026)
- Total assets: ▲₹2.33 trillion (US$24 billion) (2026)
- Total equity: ▲₹685.77 billion (US$7.1 billion) (2026)
- Number of employees: 97,015 (2024)
- Parent: Vedanta Resources
- Subsidiaries: Hindustan Zinc; Sterlite Copper; Sterlite Technologies; Nicomet Industries; Gamsberg; Black Mountain Mining; Ferro Alloys Corporation; Skorpion Zinc
- Website: www.vedantalimited.com

Vedanta Limited is an Indian multinational mining and metals company headquartered in Mumbai, with its main operations in zinc, silver, cobalt, nickel, and gold.

== History ==
=== Sterlite Industries ===
Vedanta (then called Sterlite industries) began in the 1980s, as the founder D. P. Agarwal founded Sterlite Industries (India) Limited in Mumbai and begun to buy mining concessions in different states of India. He was soon joined by his two sons, Navin Agarwal and Anil Agarwal, both of whom currently run the company. In 1992, they established Volcan investments in Nassau (Bahamas) as the main holding company for their mines. D. P. Agarwal had a small aluminium conductor business in Patna. His son Anil Agarwal had come to Mumbai to expand their business.

In the 1990s, as the Indian government began to sell off sick (non-performing) companies, Sterlite began to bid for them. They were able to bid successfully for BALCO and Hindustan Zinc Limited, both bankrupt companies that had been closed down for 4 years. Meanwhile, in January 1993, D. P. Agarwal founded Twinstar Holdings Limited in Mauritius, which was mostly owned by Volcan investments. On 26 May 2002, the Enforcement Directorate filed a show cause notice with Sterlite, relating to the six-year period between 1993 and 1999 when Twinstar acquired the shares of Sterlite and various investment companies – such as Dwarka Prasad Anil Kumar Investments Private Limited, Pravin Navin Investment & Trading Private Limited and Sterlite Copper Rolling Mills Private Limited – which, in turn, had made substantial investments in Sterlite and another group company, Madras Aluminium Company Limited (MALCO) after obtaining permission from the Reserve Bank of India (RBI). On 29 April 1999, many of these investment companies were liquidated and all the shares of Sterlite came back to Twinstar's possession. Twinstar became the 100% owner of shares in these investment companies and received government approvals from the RBI as well as the Foreign Investment Promotion Board (FIPB).

On 8 December 1999, officials of the Income Tax department raided the offices of Sterlite located at Dhanraj Mahal, Apollo Bunder and Tulsiani Chambers, Mumbai, and seized many documents. The IT department then decided to engage the services of ED officials as it appeared that there could have been a violation of the country's foreign exchange laws. After analyzing these documents, the ED inferred that Twinstar was incorporated with the sole intention of acquiring an interest in Sterlite. The Directorate alleged that the Agarwals, before liquidating the shares of the investment companies mentioned, had written off loans worth 230 million and made an agreement to gift their overseas corporate body, Twinstar, a sum of ₹338 million including shares of Sterlite worth ₹72 million. Between 1993 and 1999, Sterlite and its investment companies allegedly brought in ₹2.08 billion to India through Twinstar to subscribe to the shares of Sterlite and make investments in the company.

=== Sesa Goa – Scambi (1954–1963) ===
The company today known as Sesa Goa was founded in 1954, as Scambi Economici SA Goa. Since then, it gradually grew to become a large low-cost producer of iron ore. During 1991–1995, it diversified into the manufacture of pig iron and metallurgical coke. Scambi Economici Societa Anonyma (SESA), owned by Baron Ludovic Toeplitz, with the financial backing of Alessandro Vassalo, obtained the Orasso Dongor mining lease in Sirsaim, Goa in 1954 and Sesa Goa Limited was formed. It was bought over in 1955, with equal shareholding, by Gewerkeshaft Exploration e Bergbau and Ferromin S.p.A., a subsidiary of Finsider S.p.A. (of IRI group), which eventually acquired the other half stake in 1963.

=== Sesa Goa (1963–2007) ===
Sesa Goa Limited was incorporated as a private limited company in 1963 under the Companies Act, 1956. In 1979, Sesa Goa Private Limited was formed, with the merger of Sesa Goa Limited with another mining company in Goa, Mingoa Sociedade Miniera Goesa S.a.r.l. By 1965, Sesa Goa and Mingoa were incorporated as a private limited company under the Companies Act, 1956. The merger happened in 1979 and the new, unified company was called 'Sesa Goa Pvt Ltd'. The company went public in 1981 with 42,000 Indian shareholders, holding 60% of its shares and the remaining 40% held by Finsider International, which later became ILVA International. Sesa Goa had started with iron mining as its core business but slowly, it ventured into barge construction in 1984 at Sirsaim, located in the Bardez taluka of North Goa. Since then, the barge construction unit has been developed into a shipbuilding division.

In the 1990s, Sesa Goa began further expansion, aided by an influx of foreign investment during the economic liberalization of India enforced by the World Bank and IMF. In 1992, the first phase of a 150,000 ton pig iron plant was commissioned. In the same year, Sesa introduced India's first low-phosphorus foundry grade pig iron in India and subsequently formalised the business under pig iron division. The pig iron plant was located at Amona, Goa and had an annual production capacity of 250,000 tonnes per annum. Other alliances were formed in the nineties—in January 1995, Sesa Shipping was launched by acquiring a transhipper M.V. Orissa. The year also saw the inclusion of 84 new coke ovens. When Mitsui & Co. of Japan bought Finsider International in 1996, it gained 51% stake in Sesa Go. By 1997, Sesa Kembla became a 100% subsidiary of Sesa Goa.

In 1997, A Narrain mines located in Chitradurga, Karnataka were purchased. A Supreme Court directive in August 2011 led to suspension of mining activities in the region. In 1999, Sesa Goa started mining operations in Barbil, which has the fifth largest deposit of iron ore and manganese in the world. They started producing iron ore which was exported from the port towns of Haldia and Paradip. During this time, the company also started the Sesa Community Development Foundation that supported the NCM Sesa Technical School and a football academy called SESA F.A. In March 2024, Supreme Court also rejected a plea for reopening the plant in Tamil Nadu.

During the end of the 90s, the company also began to consolidate through mergers and acquisitions. Sesa Kembla completed the creation of an indigenous and environment-friendly technology that produced high-quality metallurgical coke. This technology generated power as a by-product. In 2003, the Sesa Goa equity in Sesa Industries was raised to 88.25%, impacting the shareholding pattern.

=== Take over by Vedanta (2007) ===
In 2007, Vedanta Resources Plc, a diversified metals and mining group founded by Anil Agarwal, acquired 51% controlling stake in Sesa Goa Ltd. from Mitsui & Co. Ltd. Vedanta Resources is listed on the London Stock Exchange and a constituent of FTSE 100 Index. The deal was worth ₹40.7 billion (US$420 million), making it the largest M&A deal in the industry so far. In 2009, Sesa Goa acquired Goa-based Dempo Group's mining and maritime businesses for ₹17.5 billion (US$180 million) in an all-cash deal. This was the second largest acquisition in India's iron-ore industry, and it gave Sesa Goa access to Dempo's 70 million tons of iron-ore mineable resources in Goa. In 2011, Sesa Goa purchased 51% stake in Western Cluster, Liberia for $90 million. The Liberia Gola Forest Community people who also suffered from the civil war believe that the coming of Western Cluster will help to alleviate their suffering and provide employment.

In 2007, it became a majority-owned subsidiary of Vedanta Resources Plc, listed on the London Stock Exchange, when Vedanta acquired 51% controlling stake from Mitsui & Co., Ltd. In June 2009, Sesa Goa Limited acquired VS Dempo & Co. Private Limited (now Sesa Resources Limited) along with its fully owned subsidiary Dempo Mining Corporation (now Vedanta Limited) and 50% equity in Goa Maritime Private Limited. In 2010, Vedanta acquired the zinc assets of British miner Anglo American plc.

In 2011, Vedanta Resources bought 58.5% controlling stake in Cairn India, India's largest private sector oil & gas company. In 2015, Sterlite Industries and Sesa Goa announced their merger and finally merged into a single entity in August 2015. In 2015, Sesa Sterlite changed its name to Vedanta Limited. On 11 April 2017, Cairn India merged with Vedanta Limited to consolidate its position as one of the largest diversified natural resources companies in the world.

In 2018, Vedanta Limited acquired control of Electrosteels Steels Limited. Electrosteel Steels had been constructing an integrated steel plant at Siyaljori in Jharkhand.

In May 2020, it is declared that company is going to delist from Indian bourses as per the comment by Mr. Anil Agarwal.

In September 2022, Vedanta signed a pact with Foxconn as a technical partner to invest ₹1.54 trillion (US$16 billion) to set up semiconductor and display production plants in Gujarat. The venture intends to start manufacturing display and chip products within two years. The investment follows the Indian government commitment to expand incentives beyond an initial $10 billion plan for those investing in manufacturing of semiconductors. Barely a year later in July 2023 the venture was ended with mutual agreement with both companies maintaining that they are still looking to set up semiconductor foundries in India.

On 24 March 2024, Vedanta Ltd announced a $6 billion investment across various business verticals, including aluminium, zinc, iron ore, steel, and oil and gas, aiming to add at least $2.5 billion to its annual EBITDA. The investment is part of a strategy involving over 50 active projects expected to generate additional revenues of over $6 billion, with plans for a significant vertical split leading to the creation of five newly listed companies.

On 28 March 2026, Vedanta's Chairman Anil Agarwal announced the company's plans to invest nearly $5 billion in the US to "build assets, access technology and partner with the best in the industry." The company later clarified that it routinely evaluates such strategic opportunities, and any discussions regarding a potential investment are "exploratory and preliminary in nature."

== Operations ==
Though the company primarily operated in Goa and Karnataka, it has gradually expanded its operations in recent years to Odisha, Rajasthan, Chhattisgarh, Tamil Nadu, Punjab, Jharkhand, Gujarat and Andhra Pradesh.

Vedanta limited owns, leases and operates in India through the following entities:

- Bharat Aluminium Company: In February 2001, Government of India in a major dis-investment deal, approved the sale of its 51% stake in BALCO to Sterlite Industries (now Vedanta Limited) for Rs.551.5 crores. The government of India owns the remaining 49.0%. Incorporated in 1965, BALCO was a profit making Public Sector Company which had played a crucial role in increasing the usage of aluminium over a wide spectrum of products ranging from household utensils to aerospace and defense sectors. BALCO is headquartered at Korba in the state of Chhattisgarh and is a vertically integrated aluminium producer having its own captive bauxite mines, captive power plants and smelter.
- Hindustan Zinc: HZL is headquartered in Udaipur in the state of Rajasthan. HZL's equity shares are listed and traded on the NSE and BSE. Vedanta owns 64.9% of the share capital in HZL and has management control. Sterlite has a call option to acquire the government of India's remaining ownership interest.
- Sterlite Copper (Tuticorin): Sterlite is registered office headquartered in Tuticorin, Tamil Nadu, India. Sterlite has been a public listed company in India since 1988, and its equity shares are listed and traded on the NSE and the BSE, and are also listed and traded on the NYSE in the form of ADSs. Vedanta owns 53.9% of Sterlite and has management control of the company. Protest by Public of Tuticorin started for not following Environmental Clearance Issues. The Tamil Nadu Pollution Control Board (TNPCB) accused the factory of releasing noxious gas in the air. It said sulphur-di-oxide levels had gone off the charts on the night of 23 March in the year 2013. It showed a reading of 2939.55 mg/cubic metre against the prescribed limit of 1250 mg/ cubic metre more people were affected by cancer and other breathing disorders but the Indian government did not take any action.
- Twin star (a Mauritius-based offshore holding company that owns sizable parts of Vedanta limited)
- Cairn India and Cairn energy India (oil and offshore exploration)
- Mines in Goa (currently frozen statewide) and Karnataka (owned by Vedanta limited)
- Electrosteel Steels limited, Jharkhand (through Vedanta star, a holding company)
- Talwandi Sabo power limited (a thermal power plant in Mansa, near Bathinda, Punjab)
- Vedanta Aluminium: Vedanta Aluminium is headquartered in Jharsuguda, Odisha. Vedanta owns 70.5% of the share capital of Vedanta Aluminium and Sterlite owns the remaining 29.5% share capital of Vedanta Aluminium. Vedanta Aluminium produces ingots, billets & wire rods that are sold in the markets around the world. Vedanta Aluminium Limited (VAL) has acquired a 24.5% stake in L & T subsidiary Raykal Aluminium. Based on achieving certain milestones, Vedanta Aluminium will fully acquire Raykal Aluminium in phases. Vedanta is undertaking an expansion program. It plans to produce around 1.5 million tonnes of aluminium in the fiscal year 2016-17 from its Jharsuguda and Korba smelters which will make it the largest aluminium producer in India. Its alumina refinery, located in Lanjigarh, plans to produce 1.5 million tonnes of alumina and depending on availability of domestic bauxite will subsequently ramp it up to 4 million tonnes per annum in the near future. Despite NGO sponsored activism, the Lanjigarh smelter has seen a lot of support from the local people who see it as an important source of employment and livelihood.
  - Madras Aluminium Company: MALCO is headquartered in Mettur, India. MALCO's equity shares are listed and traded on the NSE and BSE. It owns 93.9% of MALCO's share capital and has management control of the company.

== Shareholding pattern ==
As of 30 June 2018, the company is owned 50% by the promoters (under Finsider international and Twinstar holding, both holding companies owned under the names of 12 members of the Agarwal family) and 50% by the public. The promoters ownership (51%) is held under "Westglobe limited" under "Twinstar holdings" (37%) and Finsider international (11%). The balance 49% of the company is owned by mutual funds (ICICI Prudential), foreign portfolio investors (17%), Corporate bodies (7%), LIC India (6%), Citibank New York (4%), individual retail shareholders (5%) and Citibank NYADR (4%).

Relationship with Sesa Goa: Sesa Goa was originally a Portuguese owned company, with iron ore mines in Goa. In the 1990s, Sesa Goa was purchased by Sterlite industries (subsequently renamed as Vedanta Limited).

Vedanta Management has shared its intentions to delist company from stock exchanges subject to Shareholders approval. However, delisting is a lengthy process and may take years.

Relationship with Cairns India and Carins energy: In 2016, Cairns India and Cairns Energy were purchased by Vedanta Limited. Cairns was a US-owned company and the 2nd largest private oil and gas company in India.

== Products ==
Copper: Vedanta limited operates the largest copper smelter In India, in Tuticorin. This contributes to nearly 50% of Vedanta Limited's profits. In early 2016, due to local protests related to environment pollution, the plant was temporarily shut down by the Tamil Nadu state government. Vedanta has contested these claims, stating that its gas emissions are well below the state norms and the emissions of 11 other neighboring industries. It has also stated that their plant does not pump any water into the sea, due to a change in the plant configuration after a previous (2013) complaints from the state government.

Zinc-Lead-Silver: Zinc India business is owned and operated by Hindustan Zinc Limited (HZL). HZL owns and operates a fully integrated zinc-lead business. HZL is one of the world's largest integrated zinc-lead producers by volume. Sesa Sterlite owns 64.9% of the share capital of HZL, while the Government of India remains an equity partner and holds a 29.5% stake. HZL is listed on Indian stock exchanges (NSE and BSE).HZL's fully integrated zinc operations include five lead-zinc mines, one rock phosphate mine, four hydrometallurgical zinc smelters, two lead smelters, one lead-zinc smelter, four sulphuric acid plants, one silver refinery and six captive power plants at our Chanderiya, Dariba and Zawar facilities in the State of Rajasthan, processing and refining facilities for zinc at Haridwar and for zinc, lead and silver at Pantnagar, both in the State of Uttarakhand and in northern India. In FY 2013, these operations delivered 870,000 tonnes of mined zinc-lead metal-in-concentrate, and 802,000 tonnes of refined zinc and lead.

Aluminium: Vedanta's aluminium output rises 2% to 584,000 tonnes in second Qtr of FY23

== Controversies ==
=== 2001 SEBI case ===
In 2001, Sterlite industries, BPL and Videocon were found guilty by the Securities Exchange Board of India (SEBI) of having colluded with the broker Harshad Mehta and 17 brokers (10 from BSE and 7 from NSE) in a bid to corner shares and rig shares prices. This resulted in a ban on Sterlite from accessing capital markets for 2 years. Subsequent to this, in 2003, Vedanta Resources (UK) was listed on the London Stock Exchange. Vedanta Resources itself is a holding company that owns many entities including a large proportion of Vedanta Limited and Sterlite industries.

=== Tuticorin Sterlite protests ===
In early 2018, thousands of residents of Tuticorin began to protest against the Sterlite plant located in the industrial complex there. The protests continued for three months and began to draw the attention of the media as well as local political parties who began to instigate as well as mobilise locals. Most of the protests were related to what locals perceived to be pollution from the Sterlite factory. The managers of Sterlite countered that there were another four similar plants adjacent to them, and that they were complying with all government regulations. There was little equipment, either with the plant or with the government to take actual measurements of the air in the vicinity. Sterlite further countered that contrary to the rumours that were being circulated, they did not pump any water from the plant into the sea which lay more than 10 kilometers away. In April 2018, the Government of Tamil Nadu placed an order to close down the factory. This order was temporarily cancelled by the district collector.

In May 2018, amidst ongoing protests by thousands of people, matters turned rough one day and the police opened fire on demonstrators. The firing killed 13 people and protesters turned violent, burning vehicles and structures. Residents say the copper smelter is causing environmental damage. Subsequent to the firing, the Tamil Nadu chief minister Palaniswami ordered a judicial inquiry into the shootings but defended the police response.

== 2023-26 Demerger ==
In September 2023, Vedanta Limited announced a demerger plan to separate its businesses into independent listed entities. Following revisions to the proposal, the company outlined a structure under which Vedanta Limited would be divided into four sector-focused companies, comprising aluminium, oil and gas, power, and iron and steel businesses, while certain other operations would remain within the parent entity.

Under the scheme, shareholders of Vedanta Limited would receive shares in each of the resulting companies in proportion to their existing holdings.

The company stated that the restructuring was intended to simplify its corporate structure, enhance management focus, improve capital allocation, and enable each business to pursue its own growth strategy.

The demerger was fulky approved in early 2026, by regulatory authorities. In June 2026, the demerged companies were listed on Bombay Stock Exchange and National Stock Exchange

=== Demerger Plan Objections ===
In August 2025, Vedanta's proposed demerger plan faced significant objections from the Indian federal government and the Securities and Exchange Board of India (SEBI). The government raised concerns over concealed liabilities and incomplete disclosures, leading the National Company Law Tribunal (NCLT) to defer the hearing to September 17, 2025. SEBI issued a warning regarding modifications made to the demerger scheme post-No Objection Certificate (NOC).

== See also ==
- Mining in India
- List of mines in India
