= Mahadev Katulkar =

Mahadev Katulkar is a judge in Chhattisgarh, India.

== Career ==
Katulkar joined Judicial Services for Madhya Pradesh in 1985. During the formation of Chhattisgarh, he opted to stay at Chhattisgarh. He has dealt with several high-profile cases as a judge in Chhattisgarh.

=== 2009 Korba Chimney Collapse ===
Katulkar was appointed as Principal District & Session Judge in April 2009, and assigned a post at Korba. After taking the post, he was assigned the 2009 Korba chimney collapse case, which is to date the most deadly industrial disaster in Chhattisgarh, claiming more than 40 lives. On 26 November 2009, he rejected bail pleas of the Bharat Aluminium Co Ltd (BALCO) officials, including the BALCO Vice President and AGM. He then sent the pair into judicial custody. Later, on 18 January 2010, Katulkar rejected the bail pleas of three Chinese nationals who were contracted by SEPCO to build the power plant by BALCO. In February, 2010, Katulkar was transferred from Korba to Kanker, North Bastar, retaining his role as Principal District & Session Judge.

=== Naxal Cases ===
While at Kanker, he heard record number of cases involving Naxals, and convicted and sentenced many naxal leaders and hardcore naxals.

=== Jhaliamari Rape Case ===
In May 2013, Katulkar initiated the hearing of the Jhaliamari Rape Case. In this case, 15 tribal girls aged between 10 and 13 years were raped by hostel officials over a two-year period in a government-run Tribal Hostel in Jhaliamari Village, Kanker. Although the whole village knew about the crimes, the matter was covered up. During the trial, nearly 100 witnesses were examined, as well as a paper record totaling over 1,000 pages. He decided the case after less than six months, and on 30 October 2013, he delivered a 250-page judgment convicting all of the accused in the case, saying, "The ghastly inhuman act of convicts cannot be condoned and a substantive and stern sentence if not imposed will be miscarriage of justice. The message to be sent by court has to be loud and clear and that is "Don't Mess with a Child" and any person who meddles with the child in any manner shall not be spared as children are nation's most precious assets and most vulnerable citizens".

Further, stating that the victims came from poor tribal families that were mercilessly gang-raped by public servants, he ordered State Government to pay a compensation of Rs. 1.5 Crores (15 million), the highest compensation ever awarded in a rape case in India. This compensation was paid in addition to any other relief granted by the state.

In the judgment he made the following comment on the stigma of rape in society:

Women are told not to get raped; they must stay out of rapist's way. Attempt is to prevent the sexual assault by focusing on altering the behaviour of the victim. They are expected to learn martial arts, not go through parks alone and other ways make themselves as less accessible to sexual assault as is humanly possible. This is often extended to children also. This results not in the prevention of sexual assault but, the prevention of sexual assault on cautious women and children. The attacker continues to victimise the young, weak, vulnerable and uninformed. Sexual assaults are not prevented from this approach but, rather displaced…Secondary victimization of a victim can be far worse if not as bad as the actual sexual abuse itself. It's a general experience that rather than lending a helping hand to such people, a significant part of our society chooses to humiliate and push them into darkness of loneliness and agony. They are viewed as “damaged” and every attempt is made to force them to recall their ghastly experiences. This is the key reason for non-reporting of such offences, which acts as impunity to perverted criminals and they remain a constant danger to the society especially to women and children. For every rational mind it is hard to accept “Why a victim should be blamed for what have been done to her?” They are people who are suffering beyond description. They are innocent people, they didn't bring this upon themselves, they are the victims of the sins of other people, and had been punished for no reason. As Joseph De Maistre said “False opinions are like false money, stuck first of all by guilty men and thereafter circulated by other people who perpetuate the crime without knowing what they are doing”. Stigmatisation of rape victims is one such opinion prevalent in our society, created by guilty and perpetuated by others and is violation of mankind's most fundamental duty to protect the innocent. It is essential to renounce such practices to build a progressive society based on virtue of equality.

Later, he spoke on the mandatory reporting of sexual offences against children stating Section 21 of POSCO, Act, observing that "in child sexual abuse cases public is generally unaware that trials are the exception rather than the rule. Only a small fraction of the cases that come to official attention end in trials. Indian society has tried very hard to sweep the issue of child sexual abuse under the carpet. Many people don't want to believe that child abuse exists, or only willing to belive [sic] that certain kinds of abuse go on. They don't want to consider that something so horrific, and yet so widespread, is taking place in their community, perhaps only a door away, a few steps from their lives or even in their lives if they would only open their eyes. In the present case, Panchayat was called off, the whole village knew about rape of minor girls but they kept mum for long time and left the children to suffer the horror. Child Sexual abuses are dark realities in Society."

He further observes that the "rape of a child or woman not only affects her alone but such and incident leaves a devastating impact on her entire family who equally suffers in silence. Sexual abuse happens because the system of silence around the act perpetuates it. It happens as this system of silence encourages some more people to want it to happen, and so social and cultural attitudes which serve to underestimate woman and child especially, the female child, create an environment in which abuse can flourish...[sic] The rights of women and children and provisions for their protection will be circumscribed into statute books and remain a mere rhetoric until and unless people near them help in their enforcement."

As a result of this case, he asked free medical aid be provided to acid attack and rape victims. He further directed the Government to ensure proper, regular monitoring of Tribal Hostels to prevent any future incidents.

=== 2013 Naxal Attack in Darbha Valley Case ===
In February 2014, Katulkar took over as Principal District and Session Judge, Bilaspur and Special Judge (NIA) for state of Chhattisgarh. Katulkar was presiding over trial of 2013 Naxal attack in Darbha valley, in which 29 people were killed by naxals including State Congress President Nandkumar Patel, his son, Former Union Minister Vidhya Charan Sukhla and Leader of Opposition and Salwa Judum Founder Mahendra Karma. In April 2014, in a major move, he ordered NIA to record voice sample of alleged Mastermind of 2013 Naxal attack in Darbha valley, Gudsa Usendi who had surrendered before Andhra Pradesh Police in Jan, 2014 and induct him as accused in the case. NIA filed the charge-sheet in the case on 26 Sep 2014. But, Special Public Prosecutor was only appointed in June, 2015.

=== 2014 Chhattisgarh Sterilisation Deaths Case ===
He then presided over the 2014 Chhattisgarh Sterilization Deaths Case. The case covered the deaths of 15 women as a result because of botched sterilization procedures. He sentenced the Dr. R.K. Gupta, accused of performing the operations, to jail without bail, saying, "operations were carried out in an unruly manner, violating all guidelines and norms at a high speed for merely meeting out targets with unsuitable and contaminated instruments in unhygienic atmosphere despite knowledge that it may cause death of patients. In the manner operations were conducted more like animals being slaughtered in slaughter house without the least respect to human lives. Thus, intent of operations were not treatment and an action in good faith, rather merely meeting out targets and forming records." Katulkar further observed that, "poor people are not experimental apparatus for doctors rather they are as human as any rich man and their lives are equally precious...The incident had not only claimed lives of women, but also ruined several families and most importantly had deprived infants of their mothers". He also rejected a bail plea from drug manufacturers. Later, the Supreme Court of India also denied bail to drug manufacturers.

=== Human Trafficking Case ===
After he was moved to Bilaspur, he presided over human trafficking and kidnapping case involving a 7-year-old girl. the girl had been kidnapped for forcing her into begging. The case was closed in less than one month with a guilty verdict, with the accused sentenced to seven years imprisonment.

== Threats ==
Judge Katulkar has been receiving death threats from Naxals after he oversaw the conviction and sentencing of several naxal leaders and hardcore naxal figures. On 12 June 2015, an explosion was reported at his residence in Bilaspur. A threatening letter was later found at the site of blast. The letter asked him to step down from his role in the 2013 Naxal attack in Darbha valley case, which he ignored. Later on, it was discovered that he had received a similar threat in July, 2014. On 24 August 2015, another letter was thrown at his residence. Once again, the letter demanded he either step down from the 2013 Naxal attack in Darbha valley case, or to transfer the case to Jagdalpur, Bastar. The letter cited his previous convictions of naxal leaders, and threatened to kill him and his whole family should he fail to comply.
