= 2009 Korba chimney collapse =

Disaster at a power plant in India

Coordinates: 22.35°N 82.68°E

The chimney collapse occurred in the Indian state of Chhattisgarh

The 2009 Korba chimney collapse occurred in the town of Korba in the Indian state of Chhattisgarh on 23 September 2009. The chimney was under construction under contract for the Bharat Aluminium Co Ltd (Balco). Construction had reached 240 m (790 ft) when the chimney collapsed on top of more than 100 workers who had been taking shelter from a thunderstorm. At least 45 deaths were recorded.

== Incident and rescue ==
Plans specify a 275-metre (902 ft) chimney for the construction of a thermal power plant by Balco, which is owned by Vedanta Resources. The incident happened during extreme weather conditions involving lightning and torrential rainfall. Workers sought shelter from the rain in a nearby store room, and a lightning strike at approximately 16:00 brought the chimney down on top of them.

A rescue attempt was initiated following the collapse. Ongoing rain obstructed efforts to retrieve the trapped workers. At least seven of the wounded were hospitalised. A Gannon Dunkerley & Co Ltd employee was allegedly lynched by angry workers; his corpse was located near the scene. It was originally thought he had fallen from the chimney, but wounds indicate he was attacked.

== Reaction ==
An investigation is ongoing to determine the cause of the collapse. Balco initially did not discuss the incident at length, stating only that "[t]here is an accident and some people are injured"; claiming to be too busy with the rescue effort to make a longer statement. The state government believes that Balco had been "overlooking security aspects". District superintendent of police, Ratanlal Dangi, described it as "a massive accident". The state announced Rs.100,000 (US$2084) compensation for the family of each of the dead.

In November 2009, the project manager from GDCL was arrested, as well as three officials from Vedanta Resources which manages Balco. Later the National Institute of Technology (NIT) Raipur observed that the materials were of substandard quality and technically faulty in design. NIT also concluded that there was improper water curing and that soil at the site was not up to code. Additionally, supervision and monitoring was found to be negligent. On 11 January 2010, as a result of these findings, three senior officials of Sepco, the Chinese company contracted to build the chimney, were arrested and are being held without bail.

== Litigations ==
The 2009 Korba Chimney Collapse case was headed by Judge Mahadev Katulkar. On 26 November 2009, he rejected bail pleas of BALCO officials, including Vice-President and AGM of BALCO. He then sent the pair into judicial custody. Later, on 18 January 2010, Katulkar rejected the bail pleas of three Chinese nationals who were contracted by SEPCO to build the power plant by BALCO.

== See also ==
- List of chimneys
- List of structural failures and collapses
