= Konkola Copper Mines =

Zambian copper mining company

- Logo

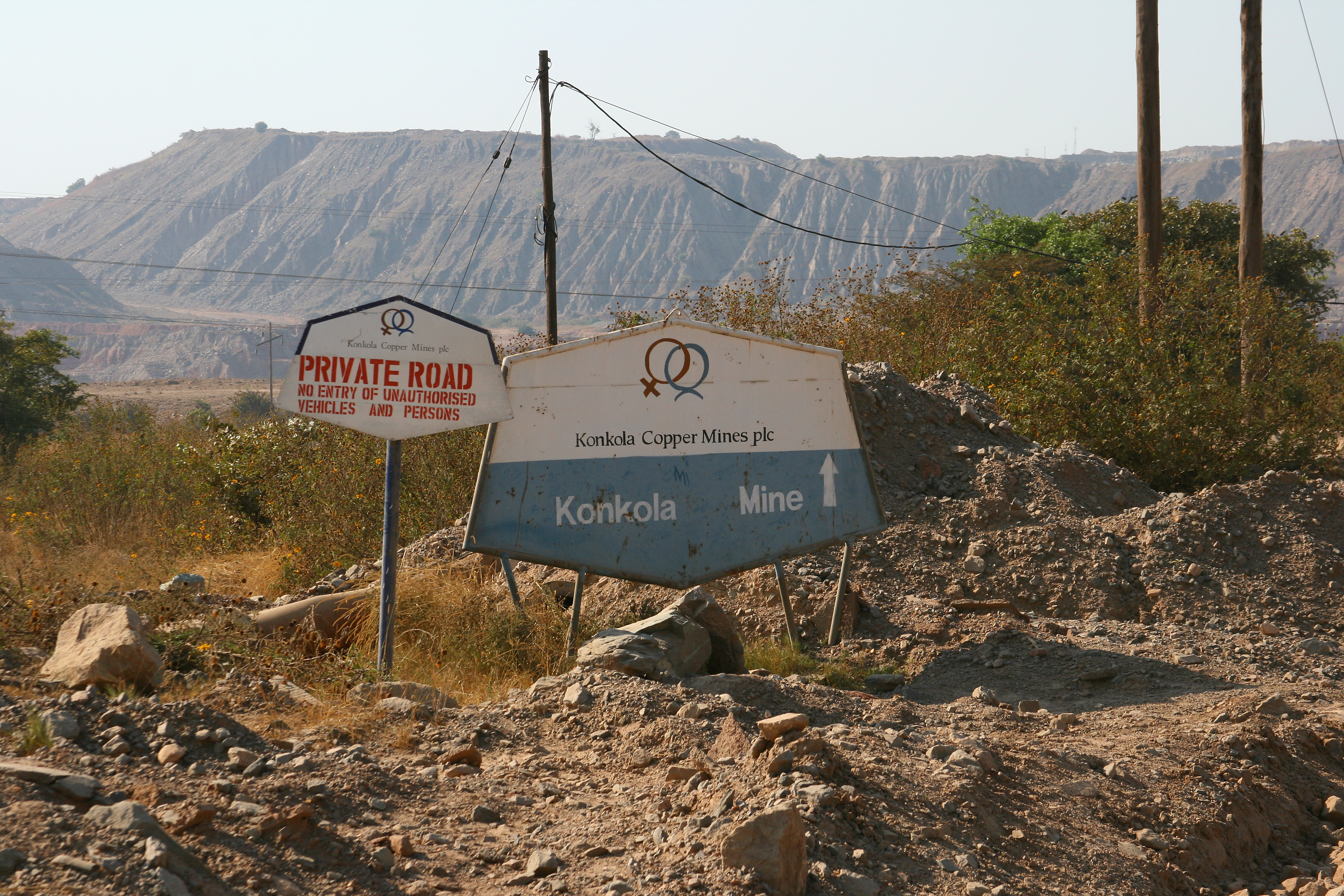
- Konkola sign, Chingola, Zambia
- Industry: Metal mining and smelting
- Headquarters: Zambia
- Parent: Vedanta Resources (~80%); ZCCM Investments Holdings (~20%)
- Website: konkolaplc.com

Konkola Copper Mines (abbreviated to KCM) is a copper mining and smelting company in Zambia. It is 80% owned by Vedanta Resources, a mining conglomerate based in Mumbai and London.

== Operations ==
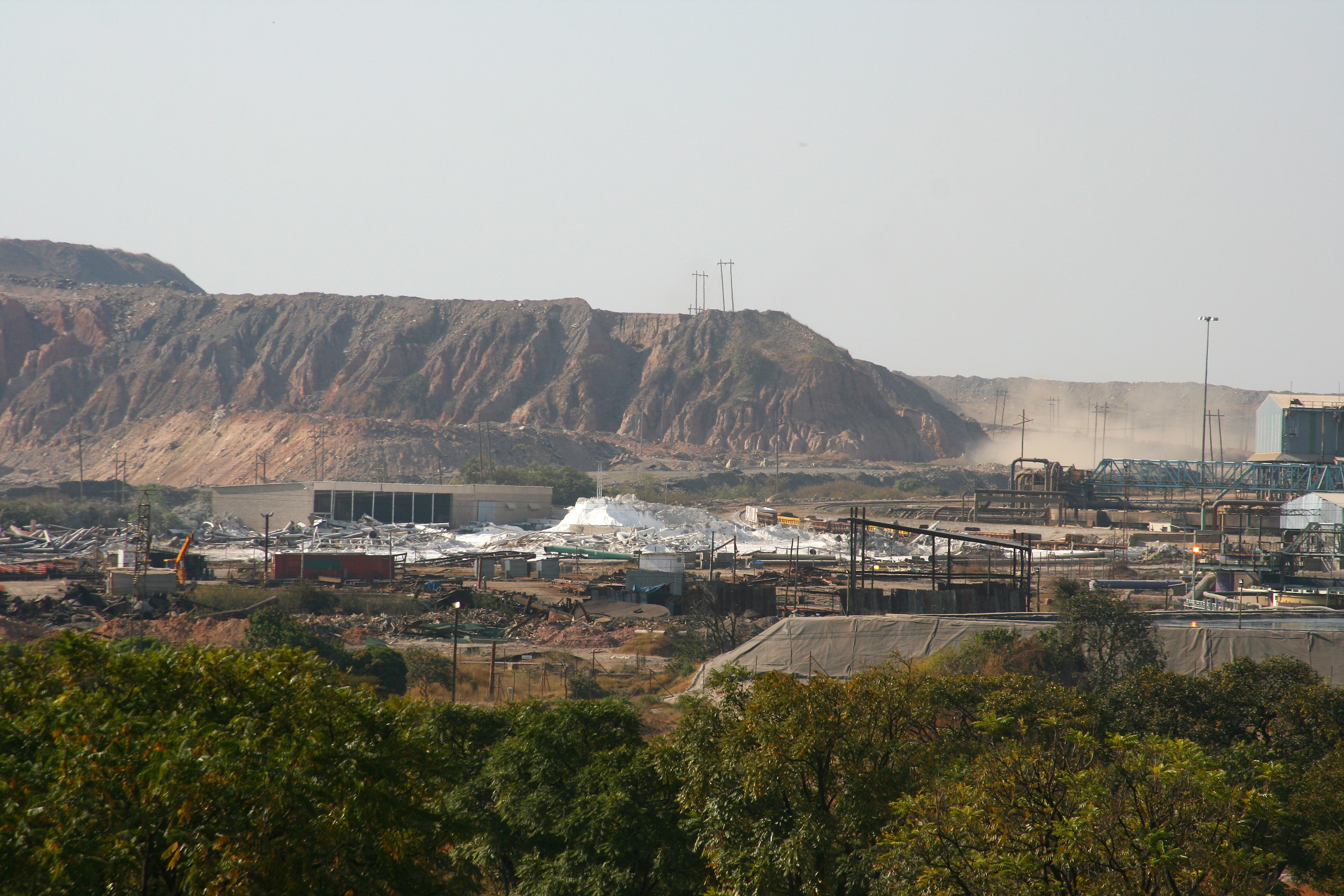
Nchanga Copper mine, 2008

The company is 80% owned by Vedanta Resources and 20% owned by the state mining company of Zambia, ZCCM Investments Holdings.

KCM produces 2 million tons of copper ore per year. The company's Konkola Deep Mining Project will expand its capacity to 6 million tons of ore per year.

Company assets include Konkola Copper Mine, Nchanga Copper mine near Chingola, Nampundwe Pyrites Mine and Nkana Refinery in Kitwe - the largest copper smelter in Zambia.

Exports were transported to the ports of Dar es Salaam in Tanzania and Durban in South Africa. Principal markets included the Middle East and East Asia. Metal was also sold domestically, to Metal Fabricators of Zambia.

== History ==
The company declared insolvency in early 2019. Later that year, 1,826 Zambians obtained permission from the Supreme Court of the United Kingdom in its Lungowe v Vedanta Resources plc ruling to sue Vedanta for local water pollution caused by KCM that started in 2005. Also in 2019, Lusaka High Court of Zambia blocked the sale of Konkola's assts by the company's liquidator. The court's judgement enabled the state controlled minority owner ZCCM Investment Holdings to enter arbitration with the majority shareholder Vendanta Resources.

Vendanta agreed a financial settlement for all pollution claims, without admitting liability, in 2021.

== See also ==
- Copper mining and extraction
