= Indians in Uruguay =

Indian people in Uruguay

Total population
- 10 (2016, est.)

Regions with significant populations
- Montevideo

Languages
- Rioplatense Spanish · English · Indian languages

Religion
- Hinduism · Roman Catholicism · Sikhism · Islam · Religions of India

Related ethnic groups
- Indian diaspora

Indians in Uruguay form a small expatriate community consisting mostly of businessmen, Indian employees of TCS and some Catholic nuns. As of January 2016, about 83 Indians hold permanent residency in Uruguay. A further 733 Indians reside in the country on long-term visas, most of whom are employed by TCS in Montevideo. A small number of Indians from the Gujarati and Sindhi communities work as importers and run retail outlets of Indian textiles and handicrafts in Uruguay.

== Overview ==
Tata Consultancy Services has established a software development centre and a regional training centre in Montevideo and it is the first IT Centre opened by TCS in Latin America. There are about 300 Indians in Montevideo; most of these are young IT professionals from TCS. Indian companies have shown interest in investment in pharma and agri-business sectors and they are encouraged to do so as they can acquire farmlands and also lease the land. As of 2013, there are 125 Indian citizens registered in the Uruguayan social security.

Early in 2013 a Gurgaon-based Private Limited company "Sharma Fabricators and Erectors (P) Ltd" established its Latin American branch to participate and carry out various construction jobs throughout the region. It present in the country with a team of 100 executives and technicians.

Indian culture has very little presence in the country as there are no Hindu or Sikh temples and Indian food and spices are very limited.

Indian Restaurants:

Moksha - Cocina de la India, is the first Indian Restaurant in Montevideo located in Punta Carretas. They have since also opened another branch in the old city (Cuidad Vieja) and third takeaway & delivery place in Malvin.

The Taste of India, has a takeout and delivery service in the heart of Pocitos neighborhood.

There are a few Yoga organizations in Uruguay, which spread Indian thought and philosophy-prominent among them are, the Sivapremananda Ashram of the Divine Society. A portion of the beach in Montevideo is named after Mahatma Gandhi and a bust of Gandhi is installed in one of the parks along the beach.

Recently, some employees of TCS have started playing cricket in Montevideo, Uruguay. Slowly, due to the curiosity surrounding the new sport, the local population of Montevideo throng to Mahatma Gandhi Rambla to see the enthusiastic people playing this new sport. This was published in a leading national daily.

The Missionaries of Charity, a Roman Catholic religious congregation founded by Mother Teresa, is also established in Uruguay.

== See also ==
- India–Uruguay relations
- Asian Latin American
- Hinduism in Uruguay
- Uruguay national cricket team
