= Copper Mines of Tasmania =

Successor to Mount Lyell Mining and Railway Company

Copper Mines of Tasmania is the successor company to the Mount Lyell Mining and Railway Company that operated in Queenstown, Tasmania for just short of one hundred years.

== History ==
The first form of the company existed during the time of the Mount Lyell Remediation and Research and Demonstration Program. Following the first form going into administration in 1998 the mine was then acquired in 1999 by Monte Cello BV. First it operated as a subsidiary and then acquired by Sterlite Industries (India) Limited. It is now owned by Vedanta Resources.

Its mine output goes to supply the companies copper smelter in Tuticorin, India.

Production stopped at the mine in January 2014 following three deaths. Its reopening was subsequently prevented by a rockfall. As of July 2014, it was not expected to reopen for up to three years.

== See also ==
- West Coast Tasmania Mines
