= 2014 Chhattisgarh sterilisation deaths =

Death of 15 women in India

In November 2014, 15 women died after undergoing improperly performed sterilization procedures performed in the Indian state of Chhattisgarh. In addition to the 15 deaths, 70 women were hospitalized in critical condition, 20 of whom were placed on mechanical ventilation.

== Background ==
Each of the women was paid to undergo the procedure. Reports differed on the amount, with some saying the amount was 1,400 rupees, while others said it was 600. The government of India sometimes pays women to undergo sterilization in an effort to curb population growth in the country.

== Sterilisations ==
On November 8, 2014, Dr. R. K. Gupta and an unnamed assistant carried out tubectomies on around 140 women in two different camps in Pendari, Bilaspur district. He was then honored by the Chhattisgarh government for carrying out the record number of sterilizations.

However, the women fell ill on November 10, 2014, two days after the surgery. By that night, eight of them had died, and their deaths were announced the following day. By November 13, 2014, 13 deaths were reported with seventy hospitalized and some admitted in AIIMS.

== Investigation ==
S.K. Mandal, the chief medical officer in Chhattisgarh, suggested that the doctor who performed the operations was under pressure to meet government-set targets for a number of sterilizations that had to be performed.

According to an unnamed medical official, by performing 83 sterilizations in six hours, the doctor had breached guidelines requiring surgeons to perform no more than 30 sterilizations per day. The unnamed doctor reacted by saying that the women were well when they left the hospital. In a telephone interview, he attributed their vomiting and abdominal pain to antibiotics they had been given. Mandal described the doctor in question as a "very senior and respected surgeon".

The exact cause of the deaths remains unclear. According to Amar Singh, the deputy health director of Chhattisgarh, the women appeared to have died from either blood poisoning or hemorrhagic shock.

The leader of the investigation, police inspector S.N. Shukla, said that preliminary investigations suggested that the deaths were caused by either contaminated equipment or adulterated medicines. According to district medical officer M.A. Jeemani, results of autopsies performed on some of the women who died suggested that the administration of tainted medicines might have caused the women's deaths. On November 15, two senior Chhattisgarh officials stated that tablets of ciprocin that had been linked to the deaths contained zinc phosphide, a chemical often used in rat poison. This conclusion arose from a preliminary report, and samples of the tablets have been sent to other laboratories for verification. The company responded to this finding by releasing a statement which said that information about the incident had been exaggerated, denying that the pills they produced were contaminated.

=== Arrests ===
After being condemned by Chief Minister Raman Singh, on 12 November, Dr. Gupta was arrested and subsequently suspended. He said, "It was not my fault - the administration pressured me to meet targets. The surgeries went well but the problem was with the medicines given to the women." The case was presided over by Mahadev Katulkar.

On November 14, 2014, the Director of Mahawar Pharma, the company that supplied medicines used in the sterilizations, was arrested and charged with fraud, and the company's drugs were banned from consumption.

== Response ==
Chief Minister Raman Singh blamed negligence for the incident, and as a result, four health officials were suspended by the state, including the district's chief medical officer. The government promised to pay the equivalent of about $6,600 to each of the affected families.

Unnamed local health officials denied any responsibility for the deaths, with some suggesting that there was added pressure from the government to perform many operations in a short period of time. Chhattisgarh Health Minister Amar Agarwal said that the government had banned six unnamed medicines used in such operations pending the investigation.

A team of doctors from All India Institute of Medical Sciences reached Bilaspur to probe the incident. Few other surgeons from the neighboring state of Andhra Pradesh were called on to assist in this crisis.
