= Anil Agarwal (industrialist) =

Indian industrialist (born 1954)

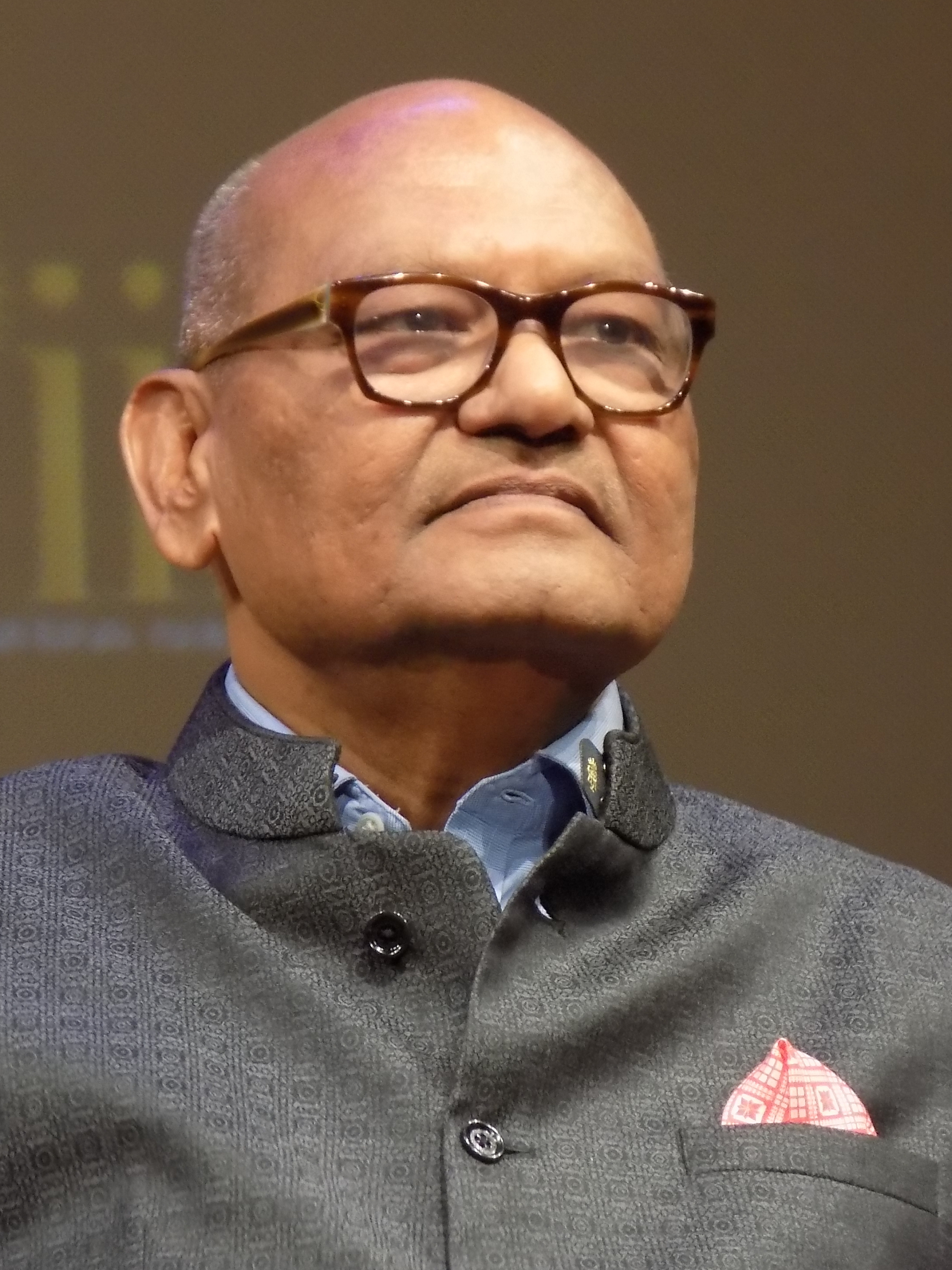
- Agarwal at 2017 FICCI - IIFA Global Business Forum
- Born: 1954 (age 71–72); Patna, Bihar, India
- Known for: The Vedanta Foundation, Sterlite Industries
- Title: Chairman of Vedanta Resources
- Spouse: Kiran Agarwal
- Children: 2
- Website: vedantaresources.com

Anil Agarwal (born 1954), is an Indian billionaire businessman who is the founder and chairman of Vedanta Resources Limited. He controls Vedanta Resources through Volcan Investments, a holding vehicle with a 100% stake in the business.

== Early life ==
Anil Agarwal was born and brought up in a Marwadi family in Patna, Bihar, India. His father, Dwarka Prasad Agarwal, had a small aluminum conductor business. He studied at Miller High School, Patna. He decided to join his father's business, making aluminium conductors instead of going to university. At 19, Anil left Patna for Mumbai (then Bombay) to explore career opportunities.

== Career ==
In the mid-1970s, he began trading in scrap metal, collecting it from cable companies in other states and selling it in Mumbai. In 1976, Anil Agarwal acquired Shamsher Sterling Corporation, a manufacturer of enameled copper, among other products, with a bank loan. For the next 10 years, he ran both businesses. In 1986, he established a factory to manufacture jelly-filled cables, founding Sterlite Industries. He soon realised that the profitability of his business was volatile, fluctuating with the prices of his raw materials: copper and aluminium. So he decided to control his input costs by manufacturing the metals instead of buying them.

In 1993, Sterlite Industries became the first private sector company in India to set up a copper smelter and refinery. In 1995, Sterlite Industries acquired Madras Aluminium, a 'sick' company that had been shut down for 4 years and held by the Board for Industrial and Financial Reconstruction (BIFR).

His first opportunity came when the government announced a disinvestment program. In 2001, he acquired 51 percent in Bharat Aluminium Company (BALCO) for an amount of INR 551.50 crore, a public sector undertaking; in the very next year, he acquired a majority stake (nearly 65 per cent) in state-run HZL(Hindustan Zinc Limited). Both companies were considered sleepy and inefficient mining firms.

To access international capital markets, Anil Agarwal and his team incorporated Vedanta Resources Plc in 2003 in London. At the time of its listing, Vedanta Resources Plc, was the first Indian firm to be listed on London Stock Exchange, on 10 December 2003, Vedanta Resources became the parent company of the group through a process of internal restructuring of group companies and their shareholding.

In 2004 Vedanta Resources Plc announced a global bond offering and acquired Konkola Copper Mines in Zambia, Africa. In 2007, Vedanta Resources acquired a controlling stake in Sesa Goa Limited, India's largest producer-exporter of iron ore, and in 2010, the company acquired South African miner Anglo American's portfolio of zinc assets in Namibia, Ireland and South Africa. The next year, Vedanta Resources acquired controlling stake in Cairn India, India's largest private sector oil-producing firm. The merger of Sesa Goa and Sterlite Industries was announced in 2012, as part of the Vedanta Group's consolidation.

Vedanta Resources, headquartered in London, is a globally diversified natural resources conglomerate, with interests in zinc, lead, silver, copper, iron ore, aluminium, power generation, and oil and gas. The greatest share of its assets, however, is in India; Agarwal lives in London.

In October 2017, it was announced that Agrawal's Volcan Holdings Plc had taken a 19% stake in mining company Anglo American, making him the biggest shareholder of the company.

According to The Sunday Times Rich List in 2020 his net worth was estimated at £8.5 billion.

According to Forbes, Vedanta and Foxconn would jointly invest about $20 billion in 2022 to build semiconductor and display plants in the Indian state of Gujarat, with Vendanta having 60% stakes in the venture.

On 8 January 2025, it was announced that Agarwal had purchased Riverside Studios in London for an undisclosed sum. The studios are now operated by the Anil Agarwal Riverside Studios Trust.

== Investments in India ==
Anil Agarwal through his Vedanta group has made several investments in various Indian states.

- He had invested ₹80000 crore earlier in Odisha, with an additional investment of more than ₹25000 crore for expansion of its Aluminium, Ferrochrome, and mining business in the state. Vedanta has invested nearly 4% of Odisha's GDP in 2022.
- Vedanta invested ₹1.54 lakh crore in Gujarat in association with Foxconn (2022), for their new semiconductor plant.

== Controversy and criticism ==
In 2004, a committee of the Indian Supreme Court charged that Vedanta had dumped thousands of tons of arsenic-bearing slag near its factory in the Indian state of Tamil Nadu, resulting in major poisoning of the environment and neighbouring population. In 2005, another committee of the Indian Supreme Court charged that Vedanta had forced over one hundred indigenous families from their homes in the Indian state of Odisha, where it sought to mine bauxite. According to the committee's report, "An atmosphere of fear was created through the hired goons", and residents were "beaten up by the employees of M/s Vedanta". Vedanta's actions in Odisha were rebuked by the British commerce agency, and the Church of England investment funds sold their shares in the company in protest. In Zambia, Vedanta dumped hazardous waste into the Kafue River from its copper mine there, according to a lawsuit filed by 2,000 residents, resulting in widespread human illness and the death of fish. A local judge stated: "This was lack of corporate responsibility and criminal, and a tipping point for corporate recklessness". In 2014, an audit was begun by Zambian officials due to suspicions that Vedanta had not been paying its proper fees to the government. In addition, "hundreds of former mine workers are fighting Vedanta for severance or disability pay."

=== Thoothukudi massacre ===
In March and April 2018, there were renewed mass protests against the company's plans to set up a second smelting complex and to demand a shutdown of its Thoothukudi (Tuticorin) smelting plants, on grounds of violating environmental regulations. On 22 May 2018, the protests took a deadlier turn as 13 people were shot died and several others injured, following a police shooting. Section 144 was imposed to control the situation. The Justice Aruna Jagadeesan Commission has not found any “specific evidence” that points to the involvement of either Sterlite Industries, as claimed by a few activist groups, or any outfit, as alleged by the then government and a few individuals such as actor Rajinikanth, in the violence of 22 May 2018.

== Philanthropy ==
In 1992, Anil Agarwal created the Vedanta Foundation as the vehicle through which the group companies would carry out their philanthropic programs and activities. In the financial year 2013–14, the Vedanta group companies and the Vedanta foundation invested US$49.0 million in building hospitals, schools and infrastructure, conserving the environment and funding community programs that improve health, education and livelihood of over 4.1 million people. The initiatives were undertaken in partnership with the government and non-governmental organizations (NGOs). Among his inspirations, Agarwal counts Andrew Carnegie and David Rockefeller who built public works with their fortunes, and Bill Gates. The activities funded by his philanthropy are focused on child welfare, women empowerment and education.

Anil Agarwal was ranked second in the Hurun India Philanthropy List 2014 for his personal donation of Rs. 1,796 crore (about $360 million). He was ranked 25th in the Hurun India Rich List with a personal fortune of 12,316cr.

In 2015, the Vedanta group, in partnership with the Ministry for Women and Child development, inaugurated the first "Nand Ghar" or modern anganwadi, of the 4,000 planned to set up. As of 2022, a total of 3,700 "Nand Ghars" have been established across 13 states in India.

Agarwal has pledged to donate 75% of his family's wealth to charity, stating that he was inspired by Bill Gates. ‌In 2021, the Anil Agarwal Foundation pledged to spend Rs 5000 crore on social impact programmes focused on nutrition, women & child development, healthcare, animal welfare, and grassroots-level sports over the course of 5 years. In the same year, along with his daughter, Priya Agarwal, he joined the Giving Pledge. He repeated the pledge on the sudden death of his son Agnivesh in January 2026.

== Personal life ==
Anil Agarwal married Kiran Agarwal in 1975. The couple has two children, Agnivesh Agarwal and Priya Agarwal. Their elder son, Agnivesh Agarwal, died in January 2026 at the age of 49.

== Awards and honours ==
- Padma Bhushan(2016).
- EY Entrepreneur of the Year Award (2008).
- Business Leader of the Year - Economic Times Awards (2012).
- The Mining Journal Lifetime Achievement Award (2009).
- Global Indian Award (2022).
