= Lungowe v Vedanta Resources plc =

Legal case heard by the UK Supreme Court

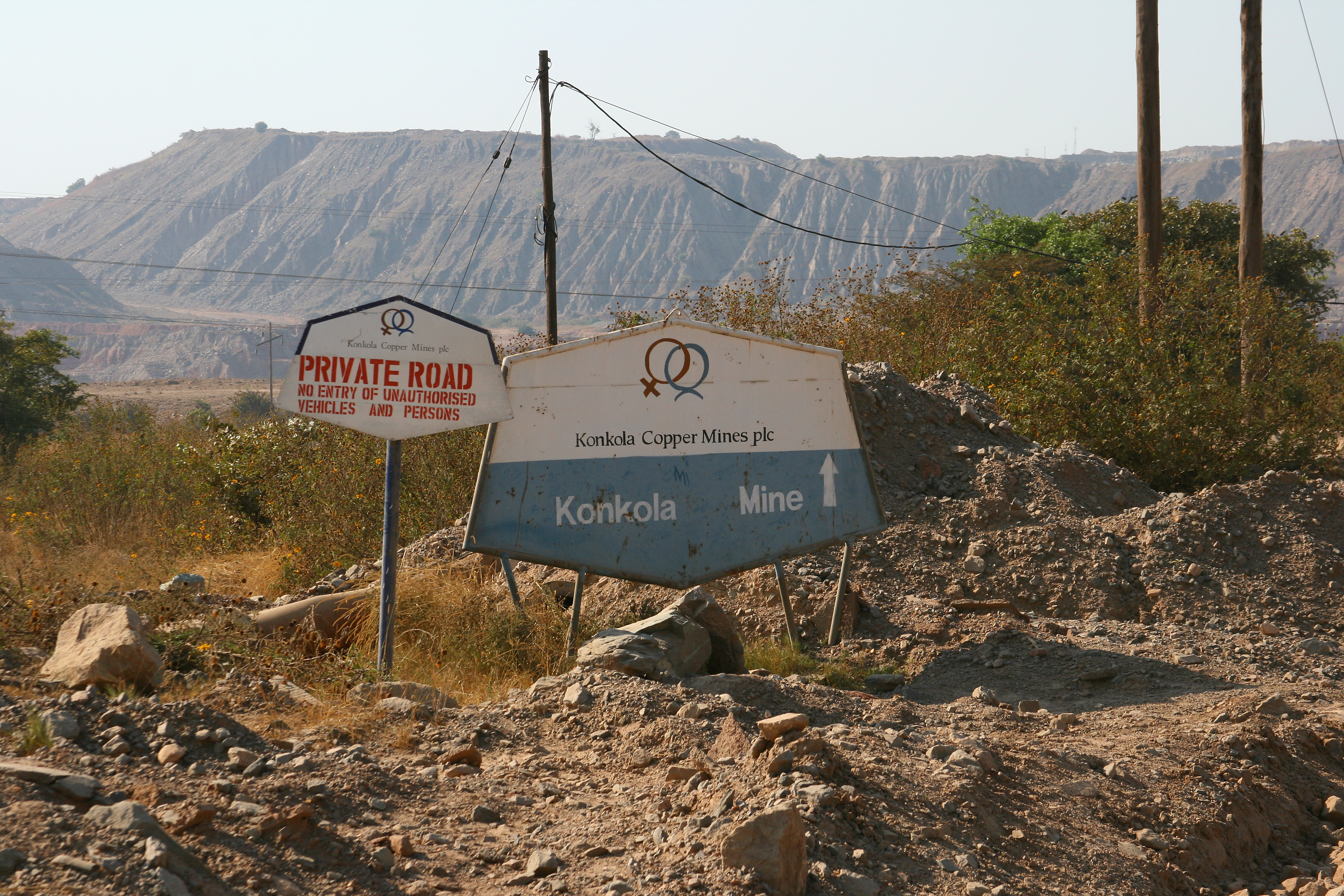
- Sign leading to Konkola Copper Mines, Zambia
- Court: Court of Appeal
- Citation: [2019] UKSC 20

Case history
- Prior actions: [2017] EWCA Civ 1528, [2016] EWHC 975

Keywords
- Environmental damage, human rights, corporate liability

Lungowe v Vedanta Resources plc [2019] UKSC 20 is a UK company law and English tort law case, concerning business liability for human rights violations, environmental damage and the duty of care owed by a parent company.

== Facts ==
From Chingola in Zambia's copperbelt region, lead claimant Dominic Liswaniso Lungowe and another 1,825 Zambian citizens claimed that Vedanta Resources plc had breached its duty of care to ensure that its Zambian subsidiary, Konkola Copper Mines Plc, ("KCM") would not harm the environment and local communities. They claimed compensation for personal injury, property damage, loss of income, amenity and enjoyment of land because of copper mine discharges. Vedanta plc argued the English court did not have jurisdiction to hear the claim and should stay proceedings on forum non conveniens grounds. It argued there was an abuse of EU law.

== Judgments ==
=== High Court ===
By an order dated 16 June 2016, issued following judgment on 27 May 2016, Peter Coulson, then a High Court judge, granted jurisdiction over the claims: the case could not be fairly pursued in Zambia. Forum non conveniens, after the case of Owusu was irrelevant under the Brussels Regulation (EU) 1215/2012 article 4. He rejected the argument that there was an abuse of EU law. To show abuse, the sole object of litigation had to be to oust another court’s jurisdiction, or that the claim was fraudulent. There was legitimate concern that the parent company was the architect of the environmental pollution, and that the Zambian company had no ability to pay. The claim had a real prospect of success in holding the parent owed a duty of care: by establishing foreseeability, proximity and reasonableness under the three-fold test for the duty of care laid down in Caparo plc v Dickman. A claim in negligence could arise from the subsidiary’s operations, according to Chandler v Cape plc. Former employees were more likely to succeed, but residents have an arguable case, both in English and Zambian law, considering Erste Group Bank AG (London) v JSC (VMZ Red October). Claims against both defendants (the parent and subsidiary company) were closely bound together. The Zambian company was a necessary and proper party to the claim against the parent company. England was an appropriate place to try the claims. Also, ‘if these claimants pursued KCM in Zambia, they would not obtain justice’. If it had been necessary, the court would have exercised discretion to allow service out of the jurisdiction on the Zambian company.

10. The claimants live in the four villages in the Chingola district noted in paragraph 1. They are situated to the northwest of the mine. The majority of them are subsistence farmers who rely on the land and the local waterways to sustain basic agrarian livelihoods. They live along the Mushishima and Kakosa streams and the Kafue River, into which those streams flow. Their income is likely to be below the average income in Zambia, which is one of the world's poorest countries. It is unlikely that many of them will have travelled outside this part of Zambia, known as the Copperbelt region.

11. Beyond those general matters, it is not possible to be more specific about the claimants because, beyond the list of names, dates of birth and areas of residence, and a number of short witness statements from a few of them dealing with general matters, no other information has been provided about the individual claimants. Specifically, there are no details about their injuries, their land, or their alleged losses.

12. The mine commenced operation in 1937, when it was wholly owned by the Anglo-American Corporation Group, at the time of the British Protectorate of Northern Rhodesia. That country was granted independence and became Zambia in 1964. In 1970 the mine was part-nationalised, with 51% owned by State-controlled companies.

13. Thirty years later, in April 2000, KCM was incorporated in Zambia as a public limited company for the purpose of privatising the mine. It was 65% owned by KCM Holdings SA (an Anglo-American subsidiary), and 35% by ZCCM-Investment Holdings Plc, a State-owned company ("ZCCM"). In 2002, Anglo-American Plc withdrew from KCM. In 2004, Vedanta Resources Holdings Limited ("VRHL"), a subsidiary of Vedanta (the first defendant), acquired a 51% interest in KCM, the remaining 49% being held by ZCCM. In February 2008 VRHL increased its shareholdings, via call options, to 79.42%. The remaining 20.58% is owned by the Zambian State through ZCCM.

14. KCM operates the mine pursuant to statutory authority in the form of a mining licence. Only a Zambian domiciled company can be the holder of a mining licence. In addition, KCM hold a number of discharge licences which, subject to various conditions, permit KCM to make certain discharges from the mine into local waterways.

15. Vedanta is an extremely wealthy holding company: there are references in the papers to it being worth around £37 billion. It has 19 employees, of which eight are directors, with the others in corporate or administrative support roles. By contrast, the Vedanta group employs 82,000 people worldwide through its subsidiary companies. Those are the operating companies, like KCM, involved in all kinds of mining and manufacture, as well as oil, gas and power generation.

The Nchanga Copper Mine

16. The Nchanga mine actually consists of two separate mines: an 11km open pit mine and a deep underground mine. The mine operates in demanding conditions given the high water table and the high annual rainfall. KCM also operate a third copper mine in Zambia which is not the subject of this litigation. KCM employ 16,000 people in Zambia, the vast majority of them at Nchanga. KCM is the largest private employer in Zambia.

17. The Google satellite images not only show the two parts of the Nchanga copper mine, but they also show the waterways in the area of the mine and in particular the Kafue River, into which the subsidiary waterways flow. It is this river and these waterways which are at the heart of the claimants' claim in these proceedings.

[...]

31. The claim against Vedanta is set out in detail between paragraphs 78 and 94 of the Particulars of Claim. The primary way in which the case is put is in negligence. Paragraph 79 alleges that Vedanta's duty of care arose as a result of their assumption of responsibility "for ensuring that [KCM]'s mining operations do not cause harm to the environment or local communities, as evidenced by the very high level of control and direction that [Vedanta] exercise at all material times over the mining operations of [KCM] and its compliance with applicable health, safety and environmental standards."

32. Then, at paragraph 80, there is an express plea of a relationship of proximity between Vedanta and the claimants. It is said that, in those circumstances, the imposition of a duty of care is fair, just and reasonable in the light of four specific factors. These are that i) the businesses of Vedanta and KCM are in a relevant respect the same; ii) that Vedanta knew or ought reasonably to have known that KCM's operations were unsafe and were discharging harmful effluent into the waterways; iii) that Vedanta had superior expertise, knowledge and resources; and iv) that Vedanta knew or ought to have known that KCM would rely on that superior expertise knowledge and resources in respect of health, safety and environmental protection.

33. These four indicia of proximity are taken directly from the judgment of Arden LJ in Chandler v Cape [2012] EWCA Civ 525; [2012] WLR 3111. It is Vedanta's case that, on a proper analysis, the tortious claim advanced by reference to Chandler v Cape is either unarguable or is so weak that the court should take that into account when exercising its discretion against allowing the claimants to serve out of the jurisdiction.

[...]

49. As noted above, the claimants' case on the Vedanta applications is very straightforward. They say that Article 4 of the Recast Brussels Regulation provides a clear and unqualified right to sue a United Kingdom domiciled company in the United Kingdom. They say that Article 4 allows for no discretion or qualification to that simple proposition. They rely on the decision of the European Court of Justice in Owusu v Jackson, which makes it plain that the doctrine of forum non conveniens has no part to play under Article 4, and that the Brussels Convention precludes a court of a contracting State from declining the jurisdiction conferred on it by Article 4 on the ground that a court of a non-contracting State would be a more appropriate forum.

50. The claimants go on to rely upon a raft of subsequent United Kingdom authorities in which the Owusu effect has been followed and applied. They point to the fact that, in the one area where this principle was doubted, namely where there were pending proceedings in another Member State, any uncertainty has been resolved by subsequent Regulations. They also reject out of hand the suggestion that, in some way, the fact that a forum non conveniens argument is not available to Vedanta is an abuse of EU law. Accordingly, they say, the court is simply not entitled to stay these proceedings. In addition they argue that, even if the court was tempted to, it would be wrong in principle to impose a stay for case management reasons, because that would be achieving by the back door that which Owusu expressly prohibits at the front.

51. Vedanta submit that Owusu is a case on its particular and straightforward facts, and can have no applicability to the very different facts that apply here. In any event they point to the reasoning in Owusu, which they say is plainly and obviously flawed and should not be followed. They seek at the very least a reference to the European Court of Justice. In the alternative, they argue that Article 4, which is expressly said to provide protection to defendants like them, is being abused by the claimants, because they are using the existence of the claim against Vedanta as a device in order to ensure that the real claim, against KCM, is litigated in the United Kingdom rather than in Zambia.

52. In addition, Vedanta refer to and rely upon KCM's submissions that there is either no real issue between Vedanta and the claimants or, if there is, the claim against Vedanta is so weak that this should be reflected in the exercise of the court's discretion in allowing KCM's application. In those circumstances, Vedanta say that, if the court is persuaded by either of those submissions, then that would also justify a stay of the claim against Vedanta. In that context, it is perhaps important to note that, because Vedanta have not submitted to the jurisdiction, they have not made any application to strike out the claim against them.

8. THE LAW 53. Article 4 of the Recast Brussels Regulation provides that:

"Subject to the Regulation, persons domiciled in a Member State shall, whatever their nationality, be sued in the courts of that Member State."

This is the successor to the earlier Article 2 and is the same terms. It is common ground that none of the exceptions within the Regulation apply to the claimants' claim against Vedanta.

54. Owusu v Jackson is authority for the proposition that forum non conveniens arguments are irrelevant to the claim against Vedanta, given the terms of what is now Article 4. As a result of this answer to the first question posed by the Court of Appeal in that case, the ECJ declined to answer the second question, which asked whether the prohibition applied "in all circumstances or only in some and if so which?" The ECJ noted at paragraph 37 that it was common ground that no exception on the basis of the forum non conveniens doctrine was provided for by the authors of the Brussels Convention, and that respect for the principle of legal certainty was one of the objectives of the Convention and "would not be fully guaranteed if the court having jurisdiction under the Convention had to be allowed to apply the forum non conveniens doctrine" (paragraph 38).

[...]

77. ... on the face of the pleading, there is a real issue to be tried between the claimants and Vedanta and that, whilst establishing their claims may not be straightforward, they are quite entitled to try and bring themselves within the class of liability recognised in Caparo v Dickman and Chandler v Cape. I cannot see how a claim that raises a real issue can also be labelled a device.

78. In addition, there is some evidence that the claimants wish to pursue Vedanta because they are seen as the real architects of the environmental pollution in this part of Zambia. The argument is that, since it is Vedanta who are making millions of pounds out of the mine, it is Vedanta who should be called to account. I acknowledge that this argument has some force, and provides a further reason why I cannot label the claim against Vedanta as a device.

79. There is a related (and possibly more important) point about corporate structure. Even though Vedanta, following the order of Akenhead J, have agreed to submit to the courts of Zambia, they are not technically bound by any judgment of those courts. Thus I would be wrong to ignore the possibility that, if the litigation was conducted in Zambia, Vedanta/KCM could seek to strike it out, or if they lost at trial, Vedanta might put KCM into liquidation in order to avoid paying out to the claimants. The history of the U&M case (paragraphs 18-24 above) demonstrates that these are possibilities which cannot be ignored.

80. Finally, there is the separate question of KCM's financial position, to which I have already referred at paragraphs 21-24 above. There are no relevant accounts. And the evidence in the public domain, summarised in Mr Day's fifth witness statement at paragraphs 121-126, indicates that KCM were in 2014 running at a significant loss. This evidence includes ministerial statements about the threat of insolvency, bankruptcy or receivership facing KCM and the existence of at least one debt of $30million which went unpaid.

81. Furthermore if there were any doubt about it, the findings of Eder J in Konkola Copper Mines Plc v U&M Mining Zambia Ltd [2014] EWHC 2146 (Comm); [2015] 1 CLC 314, firmly support the suggestion that there is a risk that KCM may not be able to honour their debts as they fall due. Whilst I accept at once that Mr Day's evidence about KCM's financial position was not at the forefront of the claimants' original application to serve out, and has been proffered late in the day, it would be wrong for the court simply to ignore it. The evidence strongly suggests that KCM may not be good for the money, so a claim against the much wealthier parent company is justified on practical grounds too.

82. Accordingly, it cannot be said that the sole purpose of the claim against Vedanta is to act as a hook for the claim against KCM. That may very well be one of its principal purposes, but I cannot ignore the fact that there is a real issue between the claimants and Vedanta and there are legitimate concerns about Vedanta's conduct and KCM's financial position. Neither can it be said that the claim is somehow a fraudulent use of Vedanta's domicile. For those reasons, therefore, I do not stay these proceedings on the basis that the claim against Vedanta is an abuse of EU law.

[...]

176. The general evidence in that case about South Africa contrasts starkly with the evidence here about Zambia, which is one of the world's poorest countries. CFAs are not lawful there. And on any view the legal system in Zambia is not well developed: indeed, in 2012 Zambia was the subject of a report by the Bureau for Institutional Reform and Democracy which highlighted the dearth of lawyers in Zambia, and the consequences for its citizens.

177. In my view, the following factors, when taken together, amount to cogent evidence that, if these claimants pursued KCM in Zambia, they would not obtain justice.

178. First, the claimants have been described as being considerably below the average income earners in Zambia. Given that Zambia is one of the world's poorest countries, where the vast majority live at subsistence levels, I can conclude that the vast majority of the claimants would not be able to afford any legal representation.

179. Secondly, in consequence of the claimants' poverty, the only way in which they could ordinarily bring these claims is by way of a CFA. But it is common ground that CFAs are not available in Zambia; indeed they are unlawful.

180. Thirdly, I find that there is no realistic prospect of legal aid for these claims. The evidence of Mr Anderson Ngulube, the Director of the Legal Aid Board of Zambia, makes this plain. The defendants, who originally suggested that legal aid would be available, backtracked, and the highest they could put it at the hearing was that there was the possibility that the claimants could obtain exceptional funding. But that evidence (from Mr Abraham Mwansa SC) emerged late and was not the subject of any detailed explanation. In any event all Mr Mwansa SC was saying was that an application could be made. He could not say what the outcome of any application for exceptional funding might be.

181. Mr Ngulube, who should know, said that even exceptional funding would only amount to around $352 per case (which is nowhere near enough here). He is emphatic in his view that the Legal Aid Board would not have the capacity or funding to commence an action in a large environmental claim on behalf of 1,800 claimants. Accordingly, I conclude that, on the evidence, there is no prospect of legal aid.

182. Fourthly, in the absence of both CFAs and legal aid, the only remaining theoretical funding possibility that would allow these claimants to bring these claims in Zambia is for the lawyers to take on the claimants as their clients on the payment of a small up-front fee; to pay for all of the disbursements, including expert evidence, out of their own pockets; and then to recover their costs when the claims were successful.

=== Court of Appeal ===
The Court of Appeal confirmed by a ruling issued on 13 October 2017 that Vedanta could be sued in England, and that the claimants' case in tort had a reasonable prospect of success.

=== Supreme Court ===
In its judgment delivered on 10 April 2019, the Supreme Court unanimously held that Vedanta Resources plc could be sued in England, applying Zambian law although this was agreed to share similar principles to English tort law. There was an arguable case that Vedanta Resources plc, as the parent company, had assumed responsibility or had a duty of care towards the claimants who were harmed by Vedanta's subsidiaries.

Lord Briggs gave the following decision, concerning the duty of care.

44 ... In the present case the critical question is whether Vedanta sufficiently intervened in the management of the Mine owned by its subsidiary KCM to have incurred, itself (rather than by vicarious liability), a common law duty of care to the claimants or, (on the claimants' expert evidence), a fault-based liability under the Zambian environmental, mining and public health legislation in connection with the escapes of toxic materials from the Mine alleged to have caused the relevant harm. The level of intervention in the management of the Mine requisite to give rise to a duty of care upon Vedanta to persons living, farming and working in the vicinity is (as is agreed) a matter of Zambian law, but the question whether that level of intervention occurred in the present case is a pure question of fact. I make no apology for having suggested during argument that it is blindingly obvious that the proof of that particular pudding would depend heavily upon the contents of documents internal to each of the defendant companies, and upon correspondence and other documents passing between them, currently unavailable to the claimants, but in due course disclosable.

45 This poses a familiar dilemma for judges dealing with applications for summary judgment. On the one hand, the claimant cannot simply say, like Mr Micawber, that some gaping hole in its case may be remedied by something which may turn up on disclosure. The claimant must demonstrate that it has a case which is unsuitable to be determined adversely to it without a trial. On the other, the court cannot ignore reasonable grounds which may be disclosed at the summary judgment stage for believing that a fuller investigation of the facts may add to or alter the evidence relevant to the issue: see Tesco Stores Ltd v Mastercard Inc [2015] EWHC 1145, per Asplin J at para 73.

46 The main thrust of the appellants' case under this heading was that a conclusion that Vedanta had incurred a duty of care to the claimants would involve a novel and controversial extension of the boundaries of the tort of negligence, beyond any established category, calling for a cautious incremental approach by analogy with established categories, which therefore required a detailed investigation of the claimants' case, which neither the judge nor the Court of Appeal carried out.

47 It was submitted therefore that this court needed to carry out that detailed analysis. For that purpose Mr Charles Gibson QC for KCM undertook, mainly in writing, a thorough review of the appellants' published documents describing their relationship, and Mr Richard Hermer QC for the claimants responded in kind, albeit to some extent under protest that this was not an exercise which this court ought to undertake.

48 It might be thought that an assertion that the claim against Vedanta raised a novel and controversial issue in the common law of negligence made it inherently unsuitable for summary determination. It is well settled that difficult issues of law of that kind are best resolved once all the facts have been ascertained at a trial, rather than upon the necessarily abbreviated and hypothetical basis of pleadings or assumed facts.

49 The appellants' submission that this case involves the assertion of a new category of common law negligence liability arises from the fact that, although the claimants chose to plead their case by seeking to fit its alleged facts within a series of four indicia given by the Court of Appeal in Chandler v Cape plc [2012] 1 WLR 3111, it was submitted that this was by no means a Chandler type of case. It may, like the claim in the Chandler case, loosely be categorised as a claim that a parent company has incurred a common law duty of care to persons (in this case neighbours rather than employees) harmed by the activities of one of its subsidiaries. But the liability of parent companies in relation to the activities of their subsidiaries is not, of itself, a distinct category of liability in common law negligence. Direct or indirect ownership by one company of all or a majority of the shares of another company (which is the irreducible essence of a parent/subsidiary relationship) may enable the parent to take control of the management of the operations of the business or of land owned by the subsidiary, but it does not impose any duty upon the parent to do so, whether owed to the subsidiary or, a fortiori, to anyone else. Everything depends on the extent to which, and the way in which, the parent availed itself of the opportunity to take over, intervene in, control, supervise or advise the management of the relevant operations (including land use) of the subsidiary. All that the existence of a parent subsidiary relationship demonstrates is that the parent had such an opportunity.

50 Mr Gibson and Mr Hermer were eventually ad idem in commending to the court the pithy and in my view correct summary of this point by Sales LJ in AAA v Unilever plc [2018] EWCA Civ 1532, para 36:

"There is no special doctrine in the law of tort of legal responsibility on the part of a parent company in relation to the activities of its subsidiary, vis-à-vis persons affected by those activities. Parent and subsidiary are separate legal persons, each with responsibility for their own separate activities. A parent company will only be found to be subject to a duty of care in relation to an activity of its subsidiary if ordinary, general principles of the law of tort regarding the imposition of a duty of care on the part of the parent in favour of a claimant are satisfied in the particular case. The legal principles are the same as would apply in relation to the question whether any third party (such as a consultant giving advice to the subsidiary) was subject to a duty of care in tort owed to a claimant dealing with the subsidiary. Helpful guidance as to relevant considerations was given in Chandler v Cape plc; but that case did not lay down a separate test, distinct from general principle, for the imposition of a duty of care in relation to a parent company."

He continued, at para 37:

"Although the legal principles are the same, it may be that on the facts of a particular case a parent company, having greater scope to intervene in the affairs of its subsidiary than another third party might have, has taken action of a kind which is capable of meeting the relevant test for imposition of a duty of care in respect of the parent."

He proceeded then to provide typical examples, which included this case, which had already by then been decided by the Court of Appeal.

51 Sales LJ thought that cases where the parent might incur a duty of care to third parties harmed by the activities of the subsidiary would usually fall into two basic types: (i) Where the parent has in substance taken over the management of the relevant activity of the subsidiary in place of or jointly with the subsidiary's own management; (ii) Where the parent has given relevant advice to the subsidiary about how it should manage a particular risk. For my part, I would be reluctant to seek to shoehorn all cases of the parent's liability into specific categories of that kind, helpful though they will no doubt often be for the purposes of analysis. There is no limit to the models of management and control which may be put in place within a multinational group of companies. At one end, the parent may be no more than a passive investor in separate businesses carried out by its various direct and indirect subsidiaries. At the other extreme, the parent may carry out a thoroughgoing vertical reorganisation of the group's businesses so that they are, in management terms, carried on as if they were a single commercial undertaking, with boundaries of legal personality and ownership within the group becoming irrelevant, until the onset of insolvency, as happened within the Lehman Brothers group.

52 Mr Gibson sought to extract from the Unilever case and from HRH Emere Godwin Bebe Okpabi v Royal Dutch Shell plc [2018] EWCA Civ 191; [2018] Bus LR 1022, a general principle that a parent could never incur a duty of care in respect of the activities of a particular subsidiary merely by laying down group-wide policies and guidelines, and expecting the management of each subsidiary to comply with them. This is, he submitted, all that the evidence thus far deployed in the present case demonstrated about the Vedanta Group. Again, I am not persuaded that there is any such reliable limiting principle. Group guidelines about minimising the environmental impact of inherently dangerous activities, such as mining, may be shown to contain systemic errors which, when implemented as of course by a particular subsidiary, then cause harm to third parties. In the Chandler case, the subsidiary inherited (by taking over a business formerly carried on by the parent) a system for the manufacture of asbestos which created an inherently unsafe system of work for its employees, because it was carried on in factory buildings with open sides, from which harmful asbestos dust could, and did, escape. As a result, and after a full trial, the parent was found to have incurred a duty of care to the employees of its subsidiary, and the result would surely have been the same if the dust had escaped to neighbouring land where third parties worked, lived or enjoyed recreation. It is difficult to see why the parent's responsibility would have been diminished if the unsafe system of work, namely the manufacture of asbestos in open-sided factories, had formed part of a group-wide policy and had been applied by asbestos manufacturing subsidiaries around the world.

53 Even where group-wide policies do not of themselves give rise to such a duty of care to third parties, they may do so if the parent does not merely proclaim them, but takes active steps, by training, supervision and enforcement, to see that they are implemented by relevant subsidiaries. Similarly, it seems to me that the parent may incur the relevant responsibility to third parties if, in published materials, it holds itself out as exercising that degree of supervision and control of its subsidiaries, even if it does not in fact do so. In such circumstances its very omission may constitute the abdication of a responsibility which it has publicly undertaken.

54 Once it is recognised that, for these purposes, there is nothing special or conclusive about the bare parent/subsidiary relationship, it is apparent that the general principles which determine whether A owes a duty of care to C in respect of the harmful activities of B are not novel at all. They may easily be traced back as far as the decision of the House of Lords in Dorset Yacht Co Ltd v Home Office [1970] AC 1004, in which the negligent discharge by the Home Office of its responsibility to supervise Borstal boys working on Brownsea Island in Poole Harbour led to seven of them escaping and causing serious damage to moored yachts in the vicinity, including one owned by the plaintiff.

55 The essence of the claimants' case against Vedanta is that it exercised a sufficiently high level of supervision and control of the activities at the Mine, with sufficient knowledge of the propensity of those activities to cause toxic escapes into surrounding watercourses, as to incur a duty of care to the claimants. In the lengthy Particulars of Claim (in which this allegation of duty of care, together with its particulars, occupied 13 pages) the claimants make copious reference, including quoted highlights, to material published by Vedanta in which it asserted its responsibility for the establishment of appropriate group-wide environmental control and sustainability standards, for their implementation throughout the group by training, and for their monitoring and enforcement. The claimants have exhibited the underlying published materials to witness statements, and relied, in addition, upon a management services agreement between Vedanta and KCM and a witness statement of a Mr Kakengela, a middle manager of KCM who gave evidence about changes in the mode of management of the Mine after KCM became part of the Vedanta Group.

56 The judge's approach to this issue may be summarised as follows. First, he accepted that it was arguable that the Zambian courts would identify the relevant principles of Zambian common law in accordance with those established in England. It is now common ground that he was entitled on the evidence to do so. Secondly, he accepted the invitation of counsel on both sides to treat Caparo Industries plc v Dickman [1990] 2 AC 605, and its three ingredients of foreseeability, proximity and reasonableness, as the starting point. This assumed, contrary to my view, that he was dealing with a novel category of common law negligence liability, but he can hardly be criticised for having done so in the light of the parties' joint invitation. Thirdly he was guided by the claimants' own pleaded case to focus upon the question whether the indicia in the Chandler case were satisfied. In my view, and that of the Court of Appeal in this case, the Chandler indicia are no more than particular examples of circumstances in which a duty of care may affect a parent. They were so described by Arden LJ when setting them out in the Chandler case. Although this if anything imposed an unnecessary straitjacket, both upon the claimants and the judge, it did not lead to the identification of a wider basis in law for the recognition of the relevant parental duty of care than that which, in my view, the law actually provides, by reference to basic principle.

57 Next, the judge reminded himself, correctly in my view, that the answer to the question whether Vedanta incurred a duty of care to the claimants was likely to depend upon a careful examination of materials produced only on disclosure, and in particular upon documents held by Vedanta: see para 118. He cautioned himself against embarking on any sort of mini-trial. At para 119 he said this:

"In the light of that view, it is unnecessary for me to identify in any detail the evidence [on] which the claimants rely in support of their case that Vedanta, as the parent company, owed a relevant duty of care."

58 He then identified in four short sub-paragraphs the particular material which supported his view that the claimants' case was arguable. They included part of the published material, namely a report entitled "Embedding Sustainability" which, he said, stressed that the oversight of all Vedanta's subsidiaries rested with the board of Vedanta itself, made particular reference to problems with discharges into water and to the particular problems arising at the Mine. He relied upon the management services agreement between Vedanta and KCM to which I have referred, upon a decision of the Irish High Court about the group (Elmes v Vedanta Lisheen Mining Ltd [2014] IEHC 73) and upon the witness statement of Mr Kakengela. He concluded by recognising the need for a cautious approach to the relevant evidence filed by KCM's principal witness Mr Ndulo, whose credibility he said had been subject to serious adverse comment (including a finding of dishonesty) by a Commercial Court judge in an earlier case: see U & M Mining Zambia Ltd v Konkola Copper Mines plc (No 3) [2014] EWHC 3250 (Comm) .

59 For its part the Court of Appeal followed a broadly similar course, while reminding itself that the Chandler indicia were no more than examples, and making a slightly different selection from the voluminous evidence of those parts of Vedanta's published statements indicative at least of an arguable case for having undertaken a sufficiently close intervention into the operation of the Mine to attract the requisite duty of care.

60 In my view the appellants' primary submission under this heading, that the judge and the Court of Appeal failed to apply sufficient rigour to their analysis of the claimants' pleadings and evidence on this question, fails in limine. This was not a case of the assertion, for the first time, of a novel and controversial new category of case for the recognition of a common law duty of care, and it therefore required no added level of rigorous analysis beyond that appropriate to any summary judgment application in a relatively complex case. Nor does the judge's judgment disclose any lack of appropriate rigour. The question as to triable issue as against Vedanta was one of a significantly larger number of contentious issues than those which have survived in this court. The reason which the judge gave for the relative brevity of his analysis of the underlying materials in para 119 of his judgment said nothing about the depth and rigour of his own review of those materials. He was merely seeking to explain why, in what was necessarily a long and detailed judgment, having formed a clear view that the case against Vedanta was arguable, it was unnecessary to burden his judgment with a lengthy and detailed description of his own analysis. For the reasons I have already given, his legal analysis may have departed slightly from the ideal, but only in respects in which either he followed the parties' joint invitation, or by imposing a straitjacket derived from the Chandler case which, if anything, increased rather than reduced the claimants' burden in demonstrating a triable issue. But in that respect those imperfections were largely cleared up by the Court of Appeal which, rightly in my view, recognised that they did not undermine the judge's conclusion.

61 This court has, again, been taken at length through the relevant underlying materials. For my part, if conducting the analysis afresh, I might have been less persuaded than were either the judge or the Court of Appeal by the management services agreement between the appellants, or by the evidence of Mr Kakengela. But I regard the published materials in which Vedanta may fairly be said to have asserted its own assumption of responsibility for the maintenance of proper standards of environmental control over the activities of its subsidiaries, and in particular the operations at the Mine, and not merely to have laid down but also implemented those standards by training, monitoring and enforcement, as sufficient on their own to show that it is well arguable that a sufficient level of intervention by Vedanta in the conduct of operations at the Mine may be demonstrable at trial, after full disclosure of the relevant internal documents of Vedanta and KCM, and of communications passing between them.

62 It matters not whether this court would have reached the same view as did the judge about triable issue. It is sufficient that, for the reasons which I have given, there was material upon which the judge could properly do so, and that his assessment was not vitiated by any error of law.

== See also ==
- English tort law
- UK company law
