= Global bond =

A global bond is a bond which is issued in several countries at the same time. It is similar to a Eurobond in that it is denominated in a currency not native to the country that it is issued, but it is also issued in several countries. It is typically issued by a large multinational corporation or sovereign entity with a high credit rating. By offering the bond to many investors, a global issuance can reduce borrowing cost.

These bonds are usually issued by large multinational organizations and sovereign entities, both of which regularly carry out large fund-raising exercises. By issuing global bonds, an issuing entity is able to attract funds from a vast set of investors and reduce its cost of borrowing.

Global bonds are issued in different currencies and distributed in the currency of the country where it is issued. For example, a global bond issued in the United States will be in US Dollars (USD), while a global bond issued in the Netherlands will be in euros. Bonds are loaned in terms of years; for example, a three-year US$2 billion global loan will be paid back by the country it is loaned to within three years at face value plus the interest rate.
