= Vedanta Resources =

Global diversified metals and mining company

Vedanta Resources Limited
- Formerly: Angelchange Limited
- Type: Private
- Traded as: LSE: VED; NYSE: VEDL
- ISIN: INE205A01025
- Industry: Mining
- Founded: 22 April 2003 (23 years ago) as Angelchange Limited
- Founder: Anil Agarwal
- Headquarters: London, England, UK
- Area served: Worldwide
- Key people: Anil Agarwal (executive chairman); Navin Agarwal (executive vice chairman); Srinivasan Venkatakrishnan (CEO)
- Products: copper, aluminum, zinc, lead, gold, iron ore, pig iron, metallurgical coke and Oil and gas exploration, power
- Revenue: ▲US$18.220 billion (2025)
- Operating income: ▲US$4.538 billion (2025)
- Net income: ▲US$3.01 billion (2025)
- Total assets: ▲US$25.671 billion (2025)
- Total equity: ▲US$2.915 billion (2025)
- Owner: Anil Agarwal
- Subsidiaries: Vedanta Limited; Konkola Copper Mines
- Website: www.vedantaresources.com

Vedanta Resources Limited is a diversified mining company headquartered in London, England. It is the largest mining and non-ferrous metals company in India and has mining operations in Australia and Zambia and oil and gas operations in three countries. Its main products are zinc, lead, silver, oil and gas, iron ore, steel, aluminium and power. It has also developed commercial power stations in India in Odisha (2,400 MW) and Punjab (1,980 MW).

The company with 20,000 employees is primarily owned by the family of Anil Agarwal through Volcan Investments, a holding vehicle with a 61.7% stake in the business. Vedanta limited (formerly Sesa Goa / Sterlite) is one of the many Indian subsidiaries of Vedanta resources and operates iron ore mines in Goa.

Vedanta was listed on the London Stock Exchange and was a constituent of the FTSE 250 Index until chairman, Anil Agarwal's offer to take the company private went unconditional in September 2018.

== History ==
The company was founded in Bombay (now Mumbai) in 1976 by Anil Agarwal, as a scrap-metal dealership. In 1979, he acquired the Shamsher Sterling Corporation (subsequently renamed Sterlite Industries), a manufacturer of power and control cables.

The company acquired a majority stake in Balco, the Indian state aluminium business, in 2001. It was first listed on the London Stock Exchange in 2003 when, as Vedanta Resources, it raised US$876 million through an initial public offering.

In 2006, Vedanta acquired Sterlite Gold, a gold mining business, and in 2007, Vedanta Resources bought a 51% stake in Sesa Goa, India's largest producer-exporter of iron ore, and the company became listed on NYSE with a US$2 billion ADS issue.

In 2008, Vedanta bought certain of the assets of Asarco, a copper mining business, out of Chapter 11 for US$2.6 billion. and in 2010, it acquired Anglo-American's portfolio of Zinc assets in South Africa, Namibia and Ireland.

In 2011, Vedanta acquired 58.5% controlling stake in Cairn India, India's largest private sector oil and gas company and in 2013, Sterlite Industries and Sesa Goa announced a merger. The merger took place in August 2013 and the consolidated group was then called Sesa Sterlite Ltd (now Vedanta Limited). In June 2018, Vedanta acquired 90% stake in Electrosteel Steels, a steel producer.

In September 2018, the company announced that Anil Agarwal would be taking Vedanta Resources private on 1 October 2018.

In 2019, Vedanta sold off the nearly 20% stake in Anglo-American it had acquired in 2017.

In September 2025, the Vedanta Project in Odisha halted over tribal rights violation claims.

== Operations ==
=== Copper ===
Sterlite Industries (India): Sterlite is registered office headquartered in Tuticorin, Tamil Nadu, India. Sterlite has been a public listed company in India since 1988, and its equity shares are listed and traded on the NSE and the BSE, and are also listed and traded on the NYSE in the form of ADSs. Vedanta owns 53.9% of Sterlite and has management control of the company. Protest by Public of Tuticorin started for not following Environmental Clearance Issues. The Tamil Nadu Pollution Control Board (TNPCB) accused the factory of releasing noxious gas in the air. It said sulphur-dioxide levels had gone off the charts on the night of 23 March in the year 2013. It showed a reading of 2939.55 mg/cubic metre against the prescribed limit of 1250 mg/ cubic metre more people where affected by cancer and other breathing disorders but the Indian government did not take any action.

Konkola Copper Mines: Vedanta owns 79.4% of KCM's share capital and have management control of the company. KCM's other shareholder is ZCCM Investment Holdings plc. The government of Zambia has a controlling stake in ZCCM Investment Holdings plc.

Copper Mines of Tasmania: CMT is headquartered in Queenstown, Tasmania. Sterlite owns 100.0% of CMT and has management control of the company.

=== Zinc ===
Hindustan Zinc: HZL is headquartered in Udaipur in the state of Rajasthan. HZL's equity shares are listed and traded on the NSE and BSE. Sterlite owns 64.9% of the share capital in HZL and has management control. Sterlite has a call option to acquire the government of India's remaining ownership interest.

=== Iron ore ===
Vedanta's iron ore mining operations in India are operated under the umbrella of Vedanta Limited, a company headquartered in Panaji, India. It has mining operations in Goa and Karnataka. Originally founded as Sesa Goa, a Portuguese company, Sesa Goa was purchased by Vedanta (then known as Sterlite industries) in the 1990s. As of 30 June 2018, the company is owned 50% by the promoters (under the names of 12 members of the Agarwal family) and 50% by the public. This includes ownership by and "Westglobe limited", "Twinstar holdings", Finsider international and mutual funds (ICICI Prudential), foreign portfolio investors (17%), LIC India (6%) and Citibank New York (4%).

Sterlite Energy: Sterlite Energy is headquartered in Mumbai. Sterlite owns 100.0% of Sterlite Energy and has management control of the company.

== Philanthropy ==
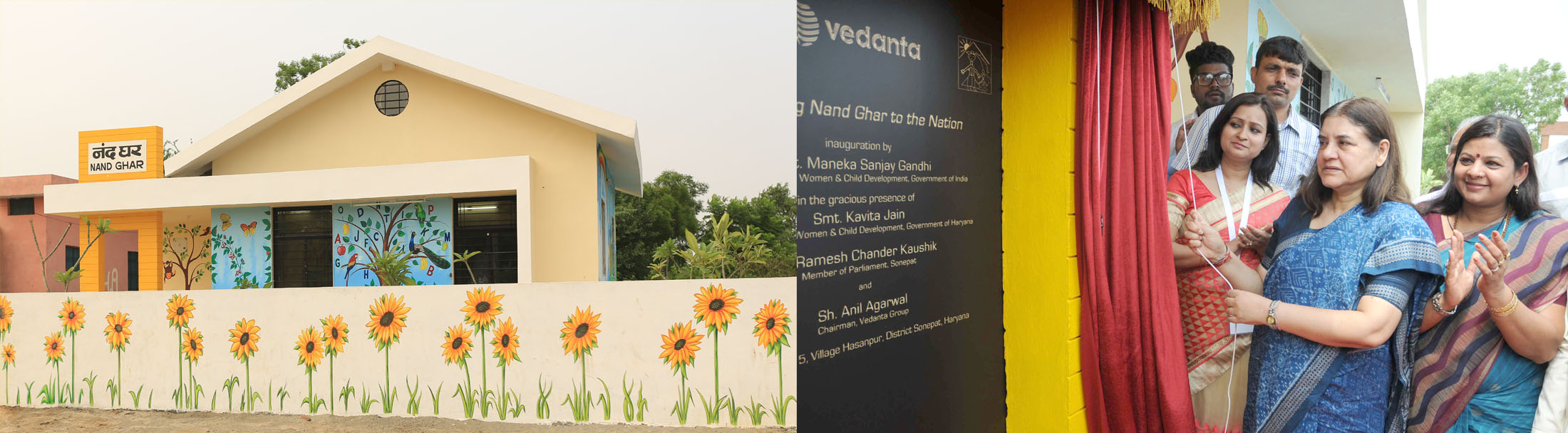
Maneka Sanjay Gandhi inaugurating the first ever modern Anganwadi Centre 'Nand Ghar' in PPP Model, at Sonipat, in Haryana on 24 June 2015. The Women & Child Development Minister of Haryana, Smt. Kavita Jain is also seen

In 1992, Anil Agarwal created the Vedanta Foundation as the vehicle through which the group companies would carry out their philanthropic programs and activities. In the financial year 2013–14, the Vedanta group companies and the Vedanta foundation invested US$49.0 million in building hospitals, schools and infrastructure, conserving the environment and funding community programs that improve health, education and livelihood of over 4.1 million people. The initiatives were undertaken in partnership with the government and non-governmental organizations (NGOs). Among his inspirations, Agarwal counts Andrew Carnegie and David Rockefeller who built public works with their fortunes, and Bill Gates. The activities funded by his philanthropy are focused on child welfare, women empowerment and education. Anil Agarwal was ranked second in Hurun India Philanthropy List 2014 for his personal donation of ₹1,796 crore (about US$36 million). He was ranked 25th in the Hurun India Rich List with a personal fortune of ₹12,316 crore.

In 2015, the Vedanta group in partnership with Ministry for Women and Child development inaugurated the first "Nand Ghar" or modern anganwadi, of the 4,000 planned to set up. Agarwal has pledged to donate 75% of his family's wealth to charity, saying he was inspired by Bill Gates.

== Environmental record ==
Vedanta has been criticised by human rights and activist groups, including Survival International, Amnesty International and Niyamgiri Surakshya Samiti because of the company's operations in Niyamgiri hills in Odisha, India that are said to threaten the lives of the Dongria Kondh people who populate this region. The Niyamgiri hills are also claimed to be an important wildlife habitat in Eastern Ghats of India as per a report by the Wildlife Institute of India as well as independent reports/studies carried out by civil society groups. In January 2009, thousands of locals formed a human chain around the hill in protest at the plans to start bauxite mining in the area. The Union Environment Ministry in August 2010 rejected earlier clearances granted to a joint venture led by the Vedanta Group company Sterlite Industries for mining bauxite from Niyamgiri hills.

Vedanta's Alumina Refinery in Lanjigarh was criticised by the Orissa State Pollution Control Board (the statutory environmental regulation body) for air pollution and water pollution in the area. According to Amnesty International, local people reported dust, allegedly from the plant, settling on clothes, crops and food. Vedanta officials claimed there was no dust pollution from the plant at all. An environmental inspection of the plant reported water pollution by the plant including a small increase of the pH value of the river Vamshadhara below the refinery and a high level of SPM in the stack emissions.

In October 2009 it was reported that the British government has criticised Vedanta for its treatment of the Dongria Kondh tribe in Orissa, India. The company refused to co-operate with the British government and with an OECD investigation. It has rejected charges of environmental damage, saying it may be related to the increased use of fertiliser by farmers.

It was reported in August 2015 that villagers in Chingola, Zambia can smell and taste toxic pollution/leaks from the largest copper mine in Africa owned by KCM.

Vedanta Resources was ranked as "the worst of the 12 biggest diversified miners at reducing emissions and planning for climate change", according to the Digging Deep report (CDP).

== Controversy ==
=== Balco, Korba, Chhattisgarh ===
A chimney under construction by Gannon Dunkerley & Company at the Balco smelter in Korba, Chhattisgarh collapsed on 23 September 2009, killing at least 40 workers. Balco and GDCL management have been accused of negligence in the incident.

=== Gamsberg Mine Landslide ===
On 17 November 2020, a mining-related "geotechnical incident" caused a landslide at the Gamsberg Mine in South Africa and 10 miners became trapped; with mining halted, eight miners were rescued, one died and one body was missing. On 18 January 2021, the company confirmed that mining operations had resumed.

== Litigation ==
=== India ===
In respect of bauxite mines at Lanjigarh, Orissa, public interest litigations were filed in 2004 by Indian non-government organisations led by the People's Union for Civil Liberties to the supreme court sub-committee regarding the potential environmental impact of the mines. The Ministry of Environment and Forests received reports from expert organisations and has submitted its recommendations to the supreme court. The sub-committee has found "blatant violations" of environmental regulations and grave concerns about the impact of the Niyamgiri mine on both the environment and the local tribal population. The committee recommended to the court that mining in such an ecologically sensitive area should not be permitted.

In July 2025, Vedanta’s plan to clear a vast forestland in Odisha was halted by the Forest Advisory Committee after evidence surfaced that they may have fraudulently obtained consent for their plans from Adivasis and other communities in the area. Residents of the villages where Gram Sabhas were held claim Vedanta created and passed false resolutions, making Vedanta's plans in violation of the PESA Act and the Forest Rights Act.

=== Human rights ===
In February 2010, the Church of England decided to disinvest from the company on ethical grounds.

The Director of Survival International, Stephen Corry, said, "The Church’s unprecedented and very welcome decision sends a strong signal to companies that trample on tribal peoples' rights: we will not bankroll your abuses. Anybody that has shares in Vedanta should sell them today if they care about human rights."

Vedanta responded by expressing disappointment at the church's actions, and that it is "fully committed to pursuing its investments in a responsible manner, respecting the environment and human rights".

The NGO Amnesty International has also criticised the company's record on human rights. It has said, "[I]t is clear that Vedanta Resources and its subsidiaries [...] have failed to respect the human rights of the people of Lanjigarh and the Niyamgiri Hills" adding, "The proposed bauxite mine [...] threatens the survival of a protected Indigenous community [...] However, these risks have been largely ignored and consultation with and disclosure of information to affected communities have been almost non-existent."

Several shareholders sold their shares because of human rights concerns. This includes the Joseph Rowntree Charitable Trust, the Marlborough Ethical Fund, Millfield House Foundation and PGGM. The Economic Times criticised the project in an editorial, stating that if the mine goes ahead it will "impoverish a defenceless populace, perhaps to extinction." In July 2010, the Chief Secretary of the Indian state of Orissa ordered a new investigation into the rights of the Dongria Kondh tribe affected by Vedanta Resources' bauxite mine, in what Survival International characterised as the "...third major blow to Vedanta in a month".

A four-member panel set up by the government of India in the Ministry of Environment and Forests investigated the bauxite mining proposal over Niyamgiri near Lanjigarh in the districts of Kalahandi and Rayagada in Orissa. The area has been the traditional habitat of two particularly vulnerable tribal groups, the Dongria Kondh and the Kutia Kondh. The committee submitted its report on 16 August 2010, saying "The Vedanta Company has consistently violated the Forest Conservation Act [FCA], the Forest Rights Act [FRA], the Environment Protection Act [EPA] and the Orissa Forest Act in active collusion with the State officials. Allowing mining by depriving two primitive tribal groups of their rights over the proposed mining site to benefit a private company would shake the faith of the tribal people in the laws of the land ". Based on a panel report, the government of India has served a show cause notice on the company on why its Stage I environment clearance should not be cancelled.

In October 2017, London's Court of Appeal in the case of Lungowe v Vedanta Resources plc ruled that nearly 2,000 Zambians could sue Vedanta Resources plc as a parent company in English courts over alleged pollution of their village. In concluding the same litigation in 2019, the Supreme Court of the United Kingdom confirmed that Vedanta could be sued in England concerning business liability for human rights violations and environmental damage.

== Legal violations ==
In July 2010, Sterlite Industries, a subsidiary of Vedanta Group, received a tax notice of about ₹3.24 billion (US$34 million), and was charged with violating several rules by the excise department in India. Excise officials charged Sterlite Industries with misdeclaration because the company is alleged to have tried shipping out copper waste for the purpose of separating gold and silver when the waste also contained other precious metals like platinum and palladium. Vendanta also owes the Income Tax Department ₹10,247 crore as retrospective tax as of January 2014.
