= Bharat Aluminium Company =

Indian aluminum company

Bharat Aluminium Company Ltd.
- Company type: Private
- Industry: Aluminium
- Founded: 1965; 61 years ago
- Headquarters: New Delhi, India
- Key people: Mr. S K Roongta (chairman) (since November 2001); Mr. Rajesh Kumar (CEO & Whole Time Director) (Since February 2023); Mr. Anand Soni (CFO) (since August 2025); Ms. Pragya Pandey (CHRO) (since January 2024); Dr. Princy John (CSR Head) (Since December 2025); Captain Dhananjay Mishra (Chief of Corporate Affairs and Administration) (Since 2025)
- Products: Aluminium; Electricity; Rural Development
- Number of employees: 7,430 (31 March 2025)
- Parent: Vedanta Resources (51%) Government of India (49%)
- Website: www.balcoindia.com

Bharat Aluminium Company Ltd. (BALCO) was an Indian government owned aluminium producer under Ministry of Mines, Government of India.

BALCO was incorporated in 1965 as the first Public Sector Undertaking (PSU) in the Indian aluminium industry. The establishment of the Bharat Aluminium Company Limited (BALCO) in India was done with Soviet assistance. The agreement formally starting the Korba Aluminium Project (the former name of BALCO) was signed by Pandit Nehru, the then Prime Minister of India, with the USSR (Soviet Union). The Korba plant was set up as an integrated aluminium complex with the aim of reducing India's dependence on imported aluminium. This collaboration was part of the broader friendly relations and technical/industrial cooperation between India and the Soviet Union during that period, which also included projects like the Bhilai and Bokaro Steel Plants.

In 2000, the Ministry of Mines, Government of India sold it to Vedanta Resources when Atal Bihari Vajpayee-Bharatiya Janta Party-National Democratic Alliance-led-government was in power. BALCO was incorporated in the year 1965 as a central public sector unit (CPSU) and it was the central government-establishment until 2001, when it was taken over by Vedanta Resources, a company listed on the London Stock Exchange. The government company has been closely associated with the Indian Aluminium Industry, in a pivotal role. Mr. Rajesh Kumar is the current CEO & Whole Time Director of the company.

== History ==
It was incorporated in 1965 as a Public Sector Undertaking. It is the first public sector enterprise in India which started producing aluminium in 1974. Till 2001, BALCO was a public sector enterprise owned 100% by Government of India. In 2001, Government of India divested 51% equity and management control in favour of Sterlite Industries India Limited. There's a little history behind the privatisation of the company that was not doing so well being a public sector company. There were groups formed among people or rather BALCO employees namely supporters of privatisation and the ones who opposed it. Rallies and processions were carried out in the evenings to oppose the privatisation and those who supported it were left in minority. Eventually, things happened as they were planned and the company was listed under Sterlite. There were allegation of scam involved in disinvestment of BALCO.

== Achievements ==
They are one of the main primary aluminium producer in India with the production capacity of 590 TPA. The development of special aluminium alloys for "Intermediate Range Ballistic Missile" – Agni and "Surface Missile" – Prithvi have been significant achievements of BALCO. BALCO has been the first in the Indian Aluminium Industry to produce the Alloy Rods, which is a Feedstock for all Aluminium Alloy Conductors, very much needed for today’s power transmission lines.

== Criticism ==
=== Safety concerns ===
A chimney under construction by Gannon Dunkerley & Company at the Balco smelter in Korba, Chhattisgarh collapsed on 23 September 2009 killing 49 workers.
