= Icici =

Icici may refer to:

- ICICI Bank, Industrial Credit and Investment Corporation of India, an Indian bank
  - ICICI Home Finance Company
  - ICICI Infotech Ltd or 3i Infotech, Indian IT company
  - ICICI Lombard, Indian general insurance company
  - ICICI Prudential Life Insurance, Indian life insurance company, joint venture with Prudential Financial
  - ICICI Prudential Mutual Fund, Indian asset management company
  - ICICI-Videocon loan scam, financial scam in India involving ICICI and Videocon
  - ICICI Knowledge Park or Genome Valley, life sciences establishment in India
- Ičići, a town in Croatia
