= Cairn Energy and Government of India dispute =

The Cairn Energy and Government of India dispute is mainly an ongoing tax and investment dispute which has its origins in 2005–2006. The case is closely linked to Cairn's partner in India, Vedanta, and to concepts such Ex post facto law in the form of retrospective taxation, bilateral investment treaties, and international arbitration between private and sovereign states.

Proceedings in the private investor-state arbitration (Cairn Energy PLC & Cairn UK Holdings Limited v. The Republic of India) at the Permanent Court of Arbitration in The Hague began on 22 September 2015 under United Nations Commission on International Trade Law (UNCITRAL) rules. The final arbitration award of US$1232 million was issued on 21 December 2020 in favour of Cairn; though compensation claimed by Cairn had been US$5584 million. To enforce the arbitration award, Cairn has registered the award around the world including in countries such as United States, United Kingdom, Canada, France, Singapore, Mauritius, UAE, Cayman Islands and Netherlands. In May 2021, Cairn sued Air India in New York. In July 2021, Tribunal judiciaire de Paris accepts Cairn's claim to seize Indian properties in France.

The case includes Vedanta Resources PLC v. Government of India in the Income Tax Appellate Tribunal of India, as well as a case in the High Court of Delhi.

India amended its income tax law in 2012, adding an amendment/clarification allowing for it to collect tax on old investments. While India applied the law on Cairn in 2015, it had done the same in 2014 to Vodafone. The case went to the Permanent Court of Arbitration and in September 2020, Vodafone got a ruling in its favour. In August 2021 India scrapped its retrospective tax provision.

== Timeline ==
=== Before 2000 ===
Year	Cairn Energy	Government of India	Related events
1950		26 January: Government of India formed; 29 July: India becomes party to and ratifies the Hague Conventions of 1899; therefore becoming party to the Permanent Court of Arbitration in The Hague.	
1959		India becomes a party to the Convention on the Recognition and Enforcement of Foreign Arbitral Awards	
1981	Cairn Energy formed		
1994	Cairn invests in India's oil and gas sector.		
1996	Cairn becomes an operator of Ravva oil field, Andhra Pradesh, India.		

=== After 2000 ===
Year	Cairn Energy	Government of India	Related events
2004	Cairn Energy completes its Mangala Area appraisal drilling.		
2006	Cairn undergoes internal restructuring in India, forms Cairn India, and transfers assets to it. Cairn India Holdings Limited was a Jersey company.		
2007	Cairn India listed on the Bombay Stock Exchange (BSE).		
2009	Prime Minister of India Manmohan Singh inaugurates Cairn's oil fields in Mangala area.		
2011	Cain Energy sells 58.5% stake in Cairn India to Vedanta Resources for $8.67 billion.		
2012		India under the UPA government and Finance Minister Pranab Mukherjee amends/clarifies its Income-tax Act, 1961.	
2014			Vodafone serves arbitration notices under India-Netherlands bilateral investment treaty.
2015	The Income Tax Department in India imposed on Cairn a tax demand of ₹20,495 crore (equivalent to ₹310 billion or US$3.2 billion in 2023), comprising tax of ₹102.48 billion and interest of ₹102.47 billion.; Cairn sues India at an investor-state dispute settlement tribunal, initiating international arbitration proceedings, citing violation of United Kingdom-India bilateral investment treaty (BIT).; 22 September: Permanent Court of Arbitration proceedings commence (Cairn Energy PLC & Cairn UK Holdings Limited v. The Republic of India). The tribunal consisted of Presiding Arbitrator Laurént Levy and one arbitrator appointed by each side. Representatives for Cairn included Quinn Emanuel Urquhart & Sullivan and Shepherd and Wedderburn, for the Indian state Gourab Banerji and Professor Chester Brown.		
2016	18 April: First procedural hearing.		
2017	April: Cairn India merges with Vedanta.		
2018	January–March: India's income tax department seizes a fraction of Cairns income; that is Cairn Energy's 5% stake in Vedanta.; A majority of Cairn Energy's seized shares are sold by the Income Tax Department.; December: Following merits hearing and final hearing, Tribunal rules in favour of Cairn.		
2020	21 December: Final arbitration award. Compensation claimed by investor was US$5584 million out of which US$1232 million was awarded.		25 September: Vodafone get positive ruling from Permanent Court of Arbitration.; 24 December: India challenges Vodafone arbitration award in Singapore.
2021	February–March: Cairn registers award and moves courts in the United States, United Kingdom, Canada, France, Singapore, Mauritius, Netherlands, United Arab Emirates and the Cayman Islands.		
2021	Cairn and Government of India Revenue Secretary hold multiple meetings.		
2021	17 May: Cairn sues Air India in New York. Cairn is relying on judgements such as the US Supreme Court judgement in the case of First National City Bank NA versus Banco Para El Comercio Exterior de Cuba (Bancec).; 11 June: Tribunal judiciaire de Paris agrees to Cairns proposal to seize Indian assets in Paris.	22 March: India files counter appeal at The Hauge following an announcement by the Finance Minister Nirmala Sitharaman on 5 March that it's her "duty" to do so.; Indian government denies reports of any properties being seized.; 5 August: Government of India introduces the Taxation Laws (Amendment) Bill, 2021, undoing the 2012 retrospective tax provision.	Devas Multimedia also files case against Air India.; 27 August: US District Court for the District of Columbia gives times till 10 September to Cairn to reply to a motion to dismiss petition.

== See also ==
- Bifurcation (law)
- Energy law
- Ex post facto law
- State immunity
