= Arun Jaitley =

Indian politician and attorney (1952–2019)

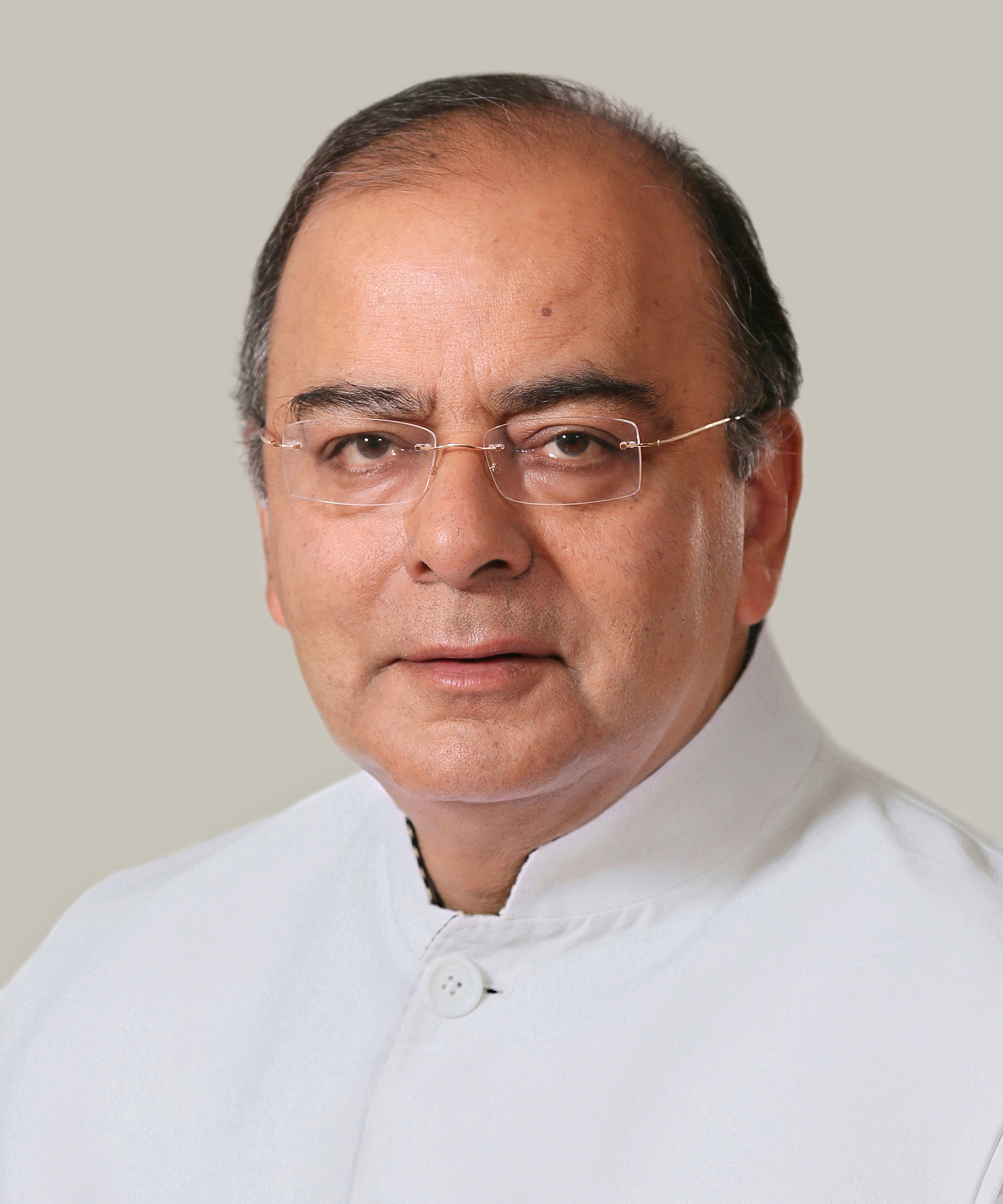
- Official portrait, 2014

Union Minister of Finance
- In office 26 May 2014 – 30 May 2019 (Note: Jaitley was on medical leave between 14 May 2018 & 23 August 2018 and 23 January 2019 to 15 February 2019, during which his colleague Piyush Goyal took over his responsibilities.)
- Prime Minister: Narendra Modi
- Deputy: Surendrajeet Singh Ahluwalia
- Preceded by: P. Chidambaram
- Succeeded by: Nirmala Sitharaman

Union Minister of Corporate Affairs
- In office 26 May 2014 – 30 May 2019 (Note: Jaitley was on medical leave between 14 May 2018 & 23 August 2018 and 23 January 2019 to 15 February 2019, during which his colleague Piyush Goyal took over his responsibilities.)
- Prime Minister: Narendra Modi
- Preceded by: Sachin Pilot
- Succeeded by: Nirmala Sitharaman

Union Minister of Defence
- In office 13 March 2017 (Note: Jaitley succeeded Parrikar due to his election as Chief Minister of Goa.) – 3 September 2017
- Prime Minister: Narendra Modi
- Preceded by: Manohar Parrikar
- Succeeded by: Nirmala Sitharaman
- In office 26 May 2014 – 9 November 2014
- Prime Minister: Narendra Modi
- Preceded by: A. K. Antony
- Succeeded by: Manohar Parrikar

Union Minister of Information and Broadcasting
- In office 9 November 2014 – 5 July 2016
- Prime Minister: Narendra Modi
- Preceded by: Prakash Javadekar
- Succeeded by: Venkaiah Naidu

Leader of the House in Rajya Sabha
- In office 26 May 2014 – 11 June 2019
- Preceded by: Manmohan Singh
- Succeeded by: Thawar Chand Gehlot

Leader of the Opposition in Rajya Sabha
- In office 3 June 2009 – 26 May 2014
- Prime Minister: Manmohan Singh
- Chairman: Mohammad Hamid Ansari
- Preceded by: Jaswant Singh
- Succeeded by: Ghulam Nabi Azad

Union Minister of Law and Justice
- In office 29 January 2003 – 22 May 2004
- Prime Minister: Atal Bihari Vajpayee
- Preceded by: Jana Krishnamurthi
- Succeeded by: H. R. Bhardwaj
- In office 23 July 2000 – 1 July 2002
- Prime Minister: Atal Bihari Vajpayee
- Preceded by: Ram Jethmalani
- Succeeded by: Jana Krishnamurthi

Union Minister of Commerce and Industry
- In office 29 January 2003 – 22 May 2004
- Prime Minister: Atal Bihari Vajpayee
- Preceded by: Arun Shourie
- Succeeded by: Kamal Nath

Union Minister of Information and Broadcasting
- In office 13 October 1999 – 30 September 2000
- Prime Minister: Atal Bihari Vajpayee
- Preceded by: Pramod Mahajan
- Succeeded by: Sushma Swaraj

Member of Parliament, Rajya Sabha
- In office 3 April 2000 – 24 August 2019
- Preceded by: Naresh Agrawal
- Succeeded by: Sudhanshu Trivedi
- Constituency: Uttar Pradesh (from 2018); Gujarat (till 2018)

Personal details
- Born: 28 December 1952 Delhi, India
- Died: 24 August 2019 (aged 66) New Delhi, India
- Party: Bharatiya Janata Party
- Spouse: Sangeeta Jaitley (m. 1982)
- Children: 2; including Rohan Jaitley
- Education: Delhi University (BCom, LLB)
- Occupation: Advocate; politician
- Awards: Padma Vibhushan (2020) (posthumously)
- Website: www.arunjaitley.com

Arun Jaitley (28 December 1952 – 24 August 2019) was an Indian politician and attorney. A member of the Bharatiya Janata Party, Jaitley served as the Minister of Finance and Corporate Affairs of the Government of India from 2014 to 2019. Jaitley previously held the cabinet portfolios of Finance, Defence, Corporate Affairs, Commerce and Industry, and Law and Justice in the Vajpayee government and Narendra Modi government.

Jaitly was a Senior Advocate of the Supreme Court of India. From 2009 to 2014, he served as the Leader of the Opposition in the Rajya Sabha. He oversaw the introduction of the Goods and Services Tax which brought the country under one GST regime, demonetisation, merger of Railway budget with general budget and introduction of Insolvency and Bankruptcy Code. Jaitley decided not to join the second Modi Cabinet in 2019, due to health issues.

He was awarded the Padma Vibhushan, India's second highest civilian award, posthumously in 2020 in the field of Public Affairs.

== Early life ==
Arun Jaitley was born on 28 December 1952 in Delhi into a Punjabi Hindu Brahmin family which migrated from Lahore during Partition of India. His father Maharaj Kishen Jaitley was a lawyer and mother Ratan Prabha Jaitley a housewife. He studied at St. Xavier's Senior Secondary School, Delhi from 1957 to 1969. He graduated with the honours degree in commerce, BCom from Shri Ram College of Commerce of Delhi University in 1973. He passed his LLB degree from Faculty of Law, University of Delhi in 1977.

Jaitley was the Akhil Bharatiya Vidyarthi Parishad (ABVP) student leader at the Delhi University Campus in the seventies and rose to be the President of the Students Union of Delhi University in 1974. During the period of proclamation of the Emergency (1975–77) when fundamental rights were suspended, he was under preventive detention for a period of 19 months. He was a prominent leader of a movement against corruption launched in the year 1973 by Raj Narain and Jayaprakash Narayan. He was the convener of the National Committee for Students and Youth organisation appointed by Jayprakash Narayan. He was also active in civil rights movement and helped found PUCL Bulletin along with Satish Jha and Smitu Kothari.

In 1977, being the convener of the Loktantrik Yuva Morcha at a time when the Congress suffered defeat, Jaitley was appointed the president of the Delhi ABVP and All India Secretary of the ABVP. He was then made the president of the youth wing of the BJP and the secretary of the Delhi Unit in 1980, a short time after joining the party.

== Legal career ==
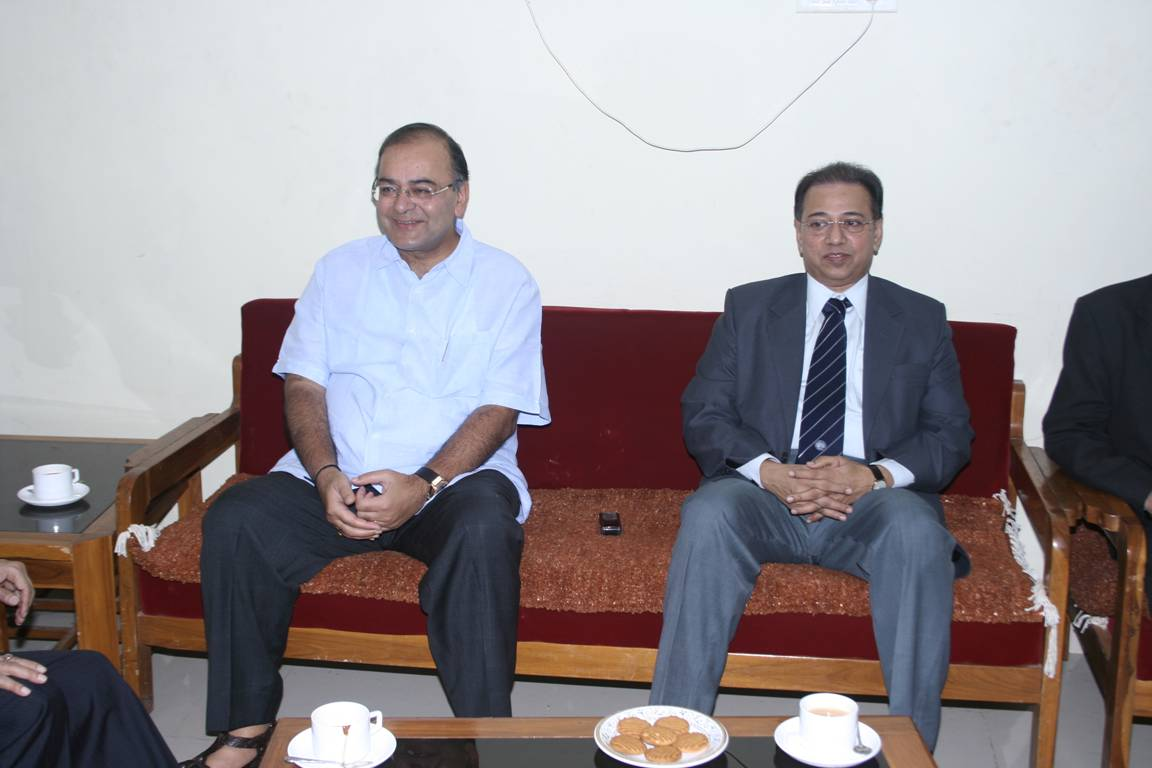
Jaitley with Former Supreme Court Judge K.S. Panicker Radhakrishnan at the Gujarat National Law University

Since 1977, Jaitley had been practising law in the Supreme Court of India and several High Courts in India. In January 1990, he was designated as a Senior Advocate by the Delhi High Court.

He was appointed Additional Solicitor General of India by the V. P. Singh government in 1989 and did the paperwork for the investigations into the Bofors scandal. His clients cover the political spectrum from Sharad Yadav of the Janata Dal to Madhavrao Scindia of the Indian National Congress to L. K. Advani of the Bharatiya Janata Party (BJP). Several publications on legal and current affairs were written by him. A paper on law about corruption and crime in India was presented by him, before the Indo-British Legal Forum. He was appointed the Government of India's delegate to the United Nations General Assembly Session in June 1998 which approved the Declaration on Laws Relating to Drugs and Money Laundering.

Jaitley had also appeared on behalf of giant multinational corporations such as PepsiCo against Coca-Cola and in various other cases in India. After having been the Minister of Law, Justice and Company Affairs, Jaitley represented Pepsi in 2002 in a case where the Supreme Court of India admonished and imposed stiff fines on 8 companies for painting advertisements on ecologically fragile rocks along the Manali-Rohtang road in the Himalayas. "The companies were also issued show-cause notices as to why exemplary damages should not be imposed on them for indulging in environmental vandalism." In 2004, Jaitley appeared on behalf of Coca-Cola in a Rajasthan High Court case.

Given his political duties as Leader of the Opposition in the Rajya Sabha, Jaitley stopped practising law in June 2009.

== Political career ==
Jaitley had been a member of the national executive of Bharatiya Janata Party since 1991. He became the spokesperson of the BJP during the period preceding the 1999 general election.

=== Union Minister for Information and Broadcasting (1999–2000) ===
On 13 October 1999, after the Vajpayee Government of the BJP led National Democratic Alliance came to power, he was appointed Minister of State for Information and Broadcasting (Independent Charge). In addition he was appointed Minister of State for Disinvestment (Independent Charge). The disinvestment ministry was created for the first time in accordance with the policy of disinvestment under the World Trade Organization regime. On 23 July 2000 following the resignation of Ram Jethmalani as the Union Cabinet Minister of Law, Justice and Company Affairs, he took over his ministry as an additional charge.

=== Union Minister of Law and Justice (2000–04) ===
In November 2000 Jaitley was made a Cabinet Minister for the Ministry of Law, Justice and Company Affairs and Shipping. The Ministry of Surface Transport was bifurcated and he was appointed as the first Minister of Shipping. He demitted the office of the Minister for Shipping with effect from 1 September 2001 and as Union Minister of Law, Justice and Company Affairs on 1 July 2002. He then served as the General Secretary of the BJP and its national spokesman. He worked in this capacity until January 2003. He rejoined the Union Cabinet as the Minister of Commerce & Industry and Law & Justice on 29 January 2003. With the defeat of the National Democratic Alliance in May 2004, Jaitley returned to his legal career and worked in the Supreme Court.

=== Leader of the Opposition, Rajya Sabha (2009–14) ===
He was chosen as the Leader of the Opposition in the Rajya Sabha on 3 June 2009 by L.K. Advani. On 16 June 2009, he resigned from the post of General Secretary of the BJP, as per his party's One Man One Post principle. He was also a member of the Central Election Committee of the party. As the leader of opposition in Rajya Sabha, he participated in the debates on the Women's Reservation Bill in the Rajya Sabha and also supported Anna Hazare in his 2011 Indian anti-corruption movement for the Jan Lokpal Bill. He successfully introduced the 84th amendment to the Constitution of India in 2002, freezing parliamentary seats until 2026, and the ninety-first amendment to the Constitution of India in 2004, penalising defections. However, being in the party since 1980, he never contested any direct election until 2014. He was the BJP candidate for the Amritsar seat in the Lok Sabha (replacing Navjot Singh Sidhu) for the 2014 general election, but lost to the Indian National Congress candidate Amarinder Singh. He was elected as a Rajya Sabha member from Gujarat. He was re-elected to the Rajya Sabha from Uttar Pradesh in March 2018.

On 26 August 2012, he said (outside Parliament) "There are occasions when an obstruction in Parliament brings greater benefits to the country." This statement was considered to have given legitimacy to obstruction by the parliament in contemporary Indian politics. After forming a government in 2014, the BJP government has faced disruption and obstruction in parliament multiple times, and the opposition have referred to this statement as a legitimising that floor strategy.

=== Union Finance Minister (2014–19) ===
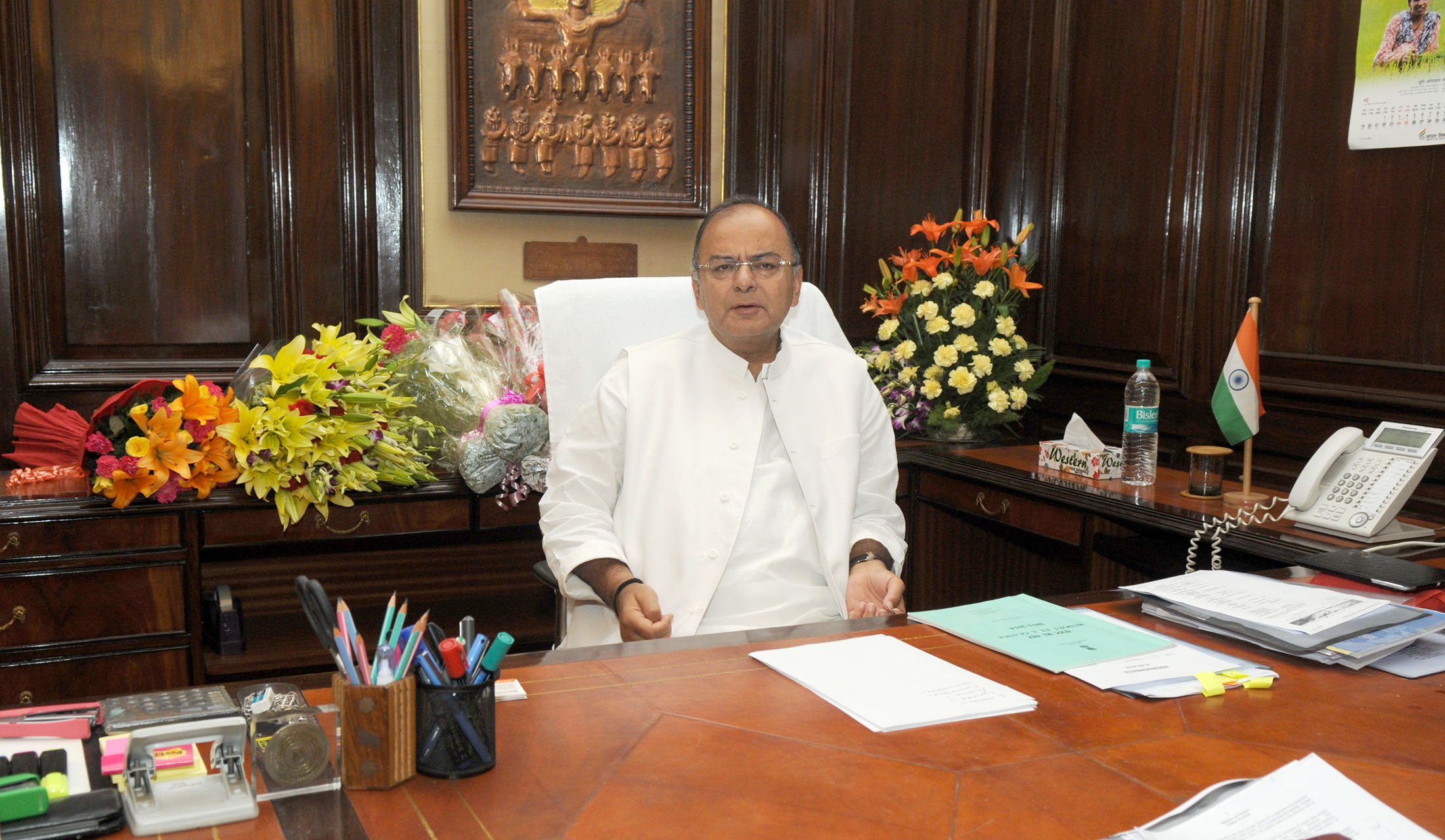
Jaitley taking charge as the Union Minister for Finance, in New Delhi on 27 May 2014

On 26 May 2014, Jaitley was selected by newly elected Prime Minister Narendra Modi to be the Minister of Finance, the Minister for Corporate Affairs and the Minister of Defence, in his cabinet. Analysts cited Jaitley's "part-time" focus on defence as a simple continuation of the policies of the previous government. According to a WikiLeaks cable by Robert Blake, the Charge at the US Embassy, to his government, When raised on the question of Hindutva, Jaitley had argued that Hindu nationalism "will always be a talking point" for the BJP and characterised this as an opportunistic issue. Jaitley later clarified that "the use of the word opportunistic in reference to nationalism or Hindu nationalism is neither my view nor my language. It could be the diplomat's own usage."

During the 2015 Bihar Legislative Assembly election, Arun Jaitley agreed with Prime Minister Narendra Modi's assertions that the idea of reservations on the basis of religion is fraught with danger and was against giving reservations to Muslim Dalits and Christian Dalits as it might impact demography. He also served as a member to the Board of Governors of Asian Development Bank. In November 2015, Jaitley said that personal laws governing marriages and divorces should be subject to fundamental rights, as constitutionally-guaranteed rights are supreme. He announced the Income declaration scheme, 2016 in September 2016.

During his tenure as the Finance Minister of India, the government demonetised the ₹500 and ₹1000 currency notes, with the stated intention of curbing corruption, black money, fake currency, and terrorism from 9 November 2016. He oversaw the introduction of the Goods and Services Tax (GST) which brought the country under one GST regime. On 20 June 2017, he reaffirmed that the roll-out of GST overseen by him as the finance minister was on track.

Out Leadership recommended Arun Jaitley as one of the experts and leaders who openly speak on LGBT+ issues. In 2015, Jaitley said that the 2013 Supreme Court ruling upholding Section 377 should be reconsidered, saying that it was out of step with legal developments elsewhere. After the Supreme Court decriminalised consensual same sex acts in September 2018, he said that he agreed with the outcome but disagreed with the reasoning, which treated sexuality as a matter of free speech.

On 29 May 2019, in a letter to Prime Minister Modi, Arun Jaitley cited his health as a reason for not taking an active role in the formation of the new government, effectively declining a role as a minister in the second term of Prime Minister Modi.

In January 2019 Jaitley generated controversy when he accused the Central Bureau of Investigation of investigative adventurism in the ICICI Bank – Videocon fraud case. The Central Bureau of Investigation had named Chanda Kochhar and her husband Deepak Kochhar as beneficiaries in the financial fraud, in which Venugopal Dhoot, the promoter of Videocon had fraudulently transferred part of the loan received from ICICI Bank to the Kochhar's business enterprise. Jaitley stated that naming the corrupt bank officials will not help in the investigation. Previously in September 2012, Jaitley had warned CBI on corruption cases involving political leaders from Gujarat.

It was during his tenure as Finance Minister electoral Bonds for political parties were introduced for funding of parties. Later these bonds were termed illegal and stopped, but the money collected by parties were never returned.

== Personal life ==
Arun Jaitley married Sangeeta, daughter of former Jammu and Kashmir finance minister Girdhari Lal Dogra, on 24 May 1982. They have two children, Sonali Jaitley and Rohan Jaitley; the former married Jaiyesh Bakhshi. Both his children are lawyers. He had two siblings.

== Illness and death ==
Jaitley had a series of health-related issues and underwent multiple surgeries leading into his deteriorating health and subsequent death in 2019. In 2005, he underwent a coronary artery bypass surgery after he was hospitalised with high blood pressure. In 2014, when he weighed 117 kilograms (258 lb), a gastric bypass surgery was performed on him aimed at reducing his weight. Doctors confirmed that Jaitley had been "suffering from diabetes for nearly two decades" then, and that the said procedure was the best option for patients with "uncontrolled diabetes". In May 2018, he underwent a kidney transplant surgery.

In February 2019, the media reported that Jaitley had been diagnosed with a rare form of soft-tissue sarcoma and was undergoing treatment in the US, although it was termed a "regular medical check-up". On 9 August, he was admitted to the All India Institute of Medical Sciences, New Delhi (AIIMS) after he complained of "breathlessness". On 17 August, it was reported that he was on life-support.

By 23 August, his health had deteriorated. Jaitley died at 12:07 p.m. (IST) the following day, aged 66. He was cremated at Nigam Bodh Ghat on 25 August. The Indian Cricket team wore black armbands for a day during the test match with the West Indies, to condole Jaitley's death.

== Legacy ==
On 12 September 2019, Delhi's Feroz Shah Kotla stadium was renamed as Arun Jaitley Stadium at a function held at Jawaharlal Nehru Stadium in memory of Jaitley. The decision to name the stadium after him came as he was once the president of DDCA and also the vice-president of the BCCI.

On 28 December 2020, Home Minister Amit Shah unveiled a statue of Arun Jaitley at the Arun Jaitley Stadium.

== Notes ==
Political offices
| Preceded by Jaipal Reddy | Minister of State for Information and Broadcasting; 1999–2000 | Succeeded by Sushma Swaraj |
| Preceded by Ram Jethmalani | Minister of Law and Justice; 2000–2002 | Succeeded by Jana Krishnamurthi |
| Preceded by Jana Krishnamurthi | Minister of Law and Justice; 2003–2004 | Succeeded by H. R. Bhardwaj |
| Preceded by Jaswant Singh | Leader of the Opposition in the Rajya Sabha; 2009–2014 | Succeeded by Ghulam Nabi Azad |
| Preceded by Manmohan Singh | Leader of the House in the Rajya Sabha; 2014–2019 | Succeeded by Thawar Chand Gehlot |
| Preceded by A. K. Antony | Minister of Defence; 2014–2014 | Succeeded by Manohar Parrikar |
| Preceded by Prakash Javadekar | Minister of Information and Broadcasting; 2014–2016 | Succeeded by Venkaiah Naidu |
| Preceded by Manohar Parrikar | Minister of Defence; 2017–2017 | Succeeded by Nirmala Sitharaman |
| Preceded by P. Chidambaram | Minister of Finance; 2014–2018 | Succeeded by Piyush Goyal |
| Preceded by Piyush Goyal | Minister of Finance; 2018–2019 | Succeeded by Nirmala Sitharaman |
| Preceded by Sachin Pilot | Minister of Corporate Affairs; 2014–2019 | Succeeded by Nirmala Sitharaman |
