= Dhoot =

Dhoot is a surname predominantly used in Maheshwari (Marwadi) community. Notable people with the surname include:

- Rajkumar Dhoot (born 1955), Indian politician
- Venugopal Dhoot (born 1951), Indian businessman
