= CRISIL =

Indian company providing analytical services

CRISIL Limited
- Formerly: Credit Rating Information Services of India Limited
- Type: Public subsidiary
- Traded as: BSE: 500092; NSE: CRISIL
- Founded: 1987; 39 years ago
- Headquarters: Mumbai, Maharashtra, India
- Key people: Amish Mehta (MD & CEO); Sanjay Chakravarti (CFO)
- Services: Ratings, data, research, analytics and solutions
- Revenue: ▲₹2,076.3 crore (US$220 million) (December 2020)
- Net income: ▲₹354.7 crore (US$37 million) (December 2020)
- Parent: S&P Global (66%)
- Website: www.crisil.com

CRISIL Limited, formerly Credit Rating Information Services of India Limited, is headquartered in Andheri, Mumbai. Incorporated on January 29,1987, it was established as India's first credit rating agency, and is a subsidiary of American company S&P Global.

== History ==
CRISIL, was the first credit rating agency in India, introduced in 1988 by the ICICI and UTI jointly with share capital coming from SBI, LIC and United India Insurance Company.

In 1993, CRISIL went public with an initial public offering (IPO).

In April 2005, Us based credit rating agency S&P acquired the majority shares of company.

As of December 2020, the company has revenue of ₹20,763 million (equivalent to ₹27 billion or US$280 million in 2026), net income of ₹3,547 million (equivalent to ₹4.6 billion or US$47 million in 2026). It is also India's largest ratings company, and as of March 2022, it had a market cap of ₹23,429 crore (US$2.4 billion).

In April 2024, Crisil Received SEBI Approval for ESG Scoring in India.

== News ==
The former Union Minister for Finance and Corporate Affairs Arun Jaitley launched CriSidEx India's first sentiment index for micro and small enterprises (MSEs) developed jointly by CRISIL and SIDBI.

CriSidEx is a composite index based on a diffusion index of 8 parameters and measures MSE business sentiment on a scale of 0 (extreme negative) to 200 (extreme positive). CriSidEx will have two indices, one for the 'survey quarter' and another for 'next quarter' once a trend emerges after few rounds of the survey, providing independent time series data. The parametric feedback was captured through a survey of 1100 MSEs in November –December.

In February 2020, Crisil completed the acquisition of Greenwich Associates LLC, a provider of proprietary benchmarking data, analytics, and qualitative insights to financial services firms.
