= Videocon Group =

Indian multinational conglomerate company

Videocon Industries Limited
- Type: Private
- ISIN: INE703A01011
- Industry: Conglomerate
- Founded: 1979; 47 years ago
- Founder: Nandlal Dhoot
- Defunct: 2021; 4 years ago
- Headquarters: Mumbai, Maharashtra, India
- Area served: Worldwide
- Key people: Anandilal Kathpitia (Chairman & MD)
- Products: Consumer electronics; Home appliances; Components; Office automation; Mobile phones; Wireless; Internet; Petroleum; Satellite television; Power
- Revenue: ▼₹12,828.6 crore (US$1.95 billion) (2017)
- Net income: ▼₹1,915.67 crore (US$291 million) (2017)
- Total assets: ₹35,738.5 crore (US$5.43 billion) (2017)
- Total equity: ₹8,391.07 crore (US$1.27 billion) (2017)
- Owner: Vedanta Resources
- Number of employees: 10,000 (2012)
- Website: videoconindustriesltd.com

Videocon Industries Limited was an Indian multinational conglomerate, headquartered in Mumbai. The company was founded in 1979, by Venugopal Dhoot. The group had 17 manufacturing sites in India and plants in mainland China, Poland, Italy and Mexico. It was the third largest picture tube manufacturer in the world valued at US$5.5 billion.

The company stopped trading and entered corporate insolvency proceeding in June 2018. In June 2021, NCLT approved Vedanta Group's bid to take over Videocon, paving the way for the new ownership.

== Early years ==
In 1985, Aurangabad based Nandlal Madhavlal Dhoot founded and incorporated Videocon International with a goal of manufacturing 1 lakh TV sets per year. "Videocon became the first company to bring colour TVs in India," claims Anirudh Dhoot, the founder's grandson (Venugopal Dhoot's son) and Videocon's current director.

== Corporate profile ==
The Videocon group's core areas of business are consumer electronics and home appliances. They diversified into areas such as DTH, power and oil exploration.

=== Consumer electronics ===
In India, the group sold consumer products like colour televisions, washing machines, air conditioners, refrigerators, microwave ovens and many other home appliances, through a multi-brand strategy with the largest sales and service network in India.

Since the entry of Korean Chaebols and their rising popularity in the Indian market, Videocon from a stand-point of market leader has seen a slow decline to become a no. 3 player in India. The company continued to do well in the washing machine and refrigerator segment.

=== Mobile phones ===
In November 2009, Videocon launched its new line of mobile phones. Videocon has since launched a number of handsets ranging from basic colour FM phones to high-end Android devices. In February 2011, Videocon Mobile Phones launched the hitherto unknown concept of 'Zero' paise (1 paisa is the 100th unit of 1 Indian rupee) per second with bundled SIM cards of Videocon mobile services for 7 of its handset models. In July 2015, Videocon Mobiles launched its own flagship smartphone Videocon Infinium Z51+ in India. On 7 June 2016, Videocon Mobile launched its new smartphone 'Videocon Cube3 V50290' in India.

Videocon Petroleum had 25% stake in Ravva oil field which is operated by Cairn India in Andhra Pradesh.

==== Acquisition of CPT arm of Thomson SA ====
Videocon acquired the colour picture tube (CPT) businesses from Thomson S.A. of France having manufacturing facilities in Poland, Italy, Mexico and China along with support research and development facilities in the fiscal year 2005.

== Decline ==
In 2018, following losses in its oil businesses, the company entered insolvency proceedings.

=== Controversy with ICICI loan fraud ===
On 4 October 2018, Chanda Kochhar, the ex MD and CEO of ICICI Bank had to step down from her position following allegations of corruption in sanctioning loans to Videocon. Amidst investigations related to Videocon bad loans, she was forced by the board of ICICI Bank to take indefinite leave. The Central Bureau of Investigation named Chanda Kochhar and her husband Deepak Kochhar as beneficiaries in the financial fraud between June 2009 and October 2011. Venugopal Dhoot, the promoter of Videocon had fraudulently transferred part of the loan received from ICICI Bank to the Kochhars' business entreprise after Chanda Kochhar, Sandeep Bakhshi became the full time managing director and CEO of ICICI Bank.

== See also ==
- Onida Electronics
- Moser Baer
- BPL Group
- Sansui Electric
