= Ravva oil field =

Oil field in Andra Pradesh, India

- Location of Ravva Oil Onshore facilities
- Country: India
- Region: Andhra Pradesh
- Location: Surasani Yanam, Konaseema District
- Block: PKGM-1
- Offshore/onshore: Offshore
- Coordinates: 16.4879328°N 82.0896668°E
- Operator: Cairn Energy
- Partners: Cairn India, ONGC, Videocon and Ravva Oil Singapore Private Limited
- Service contractors: Petrodril, VP Petro6 Engineers

Field history
- Discovery: 1987
- Start of development: 1993
- Start of production: 1994

Production
- Current production of oil: 25,986 barrels per day (~1.295×10^{6} t/a)
- Year of current production of oil: 2015

The Ravva oil field in the Krishna Godavari Basin is located in coastal Andhra Pradesh.

== Ownership ==
The field is operated by Cairn India with a 22.5% share. Its partners in the field are the Oil and Natural Gas Corporation (ONGC) with a 40% share, Videocon Petroleum with a 25% share and Ravva Oil Singapore Private Limited with a 12.5%.

== Development and production ==
The oil field was developed in partnership with Cairn India, ONGC, Videocon and Ravva Oil Singapore Private Limited, under a 25-year production sharing contract (PSC) that expired in 2019. There are eight unmanned offshore platforms and sub-sea pipelines are being operated. The crude oil produced from the Ravva field is transferred to the Ravva onshore terminal via four pipelines. Processing takes place at a 225-acre facility at Surasani Yanam. The onshore storage capacity is one million barrels.

== See also ==
- Bombay High
- Krishna Godavari Basin
