= ICICI Prudential Mutual Fund =

Indian asset management company

- Type: Joint venture
- Industry: Investment management
- Founded: 1993; 33 years ago
- Headquarters: Mumbai, India
- Area served: India
- Key people: Mr. Nimesh Shah (MD & CEO); Mr. S. Naren (Chief Investment Officer); Mr. Rahul Goswami (Chief Investment Officer – Fixed Income)
- Products: Asset Management; Wealth Management
- AUM: ▲₹671,442 crore (US$70 billion) (December 2023)
- Owner: ICICI Bank (51%); Prudential Plc (49%)
- Number of employees: 2000–2500 (2022)
- Website: www.icicipruamc.com

ICICI Prudential Mutual Fund is an Indian asset management company headquartered in Santacruz, Mumbai, founded in 1993 as a joint venture between ICICI Bank and Prudential plc. It is the second-largest asset management company in India after the SBI Mutual Fund.

== History ==
The company was founded in 1993 as a joint venture between Indian ICICI Bank and UK insurance company Prudential plc. By 1998, it had two locations and six employees.

Since the establishment of the joint venture in 1998, the company has expanded its operation from 2 offices to over 281 locations across India. As of 2026, the asset management company employs over 3500 people across its branch network.

ICICI Prudential Mutual Fund's corporate headquartered in Santacruz, Mumbai. As of 2016 it had grown to over a thousand employees across 120 locations with more than 1.9 million investors.

As of June 30, 2026, ICICI Prudential AMC reported a Quarterly Average Asstes Under Management (QAAUM), including alternates, exceeding ₹11.96 lakh crore.

== Products and services ==
The asset management company (AMC) manages significant Assets Under Management (AUM) in the Mutual Fund segment across asset classes in India. The AMC also caters to Portfolio Management Services and Real Estate Division for investors, spread across the country, along with International Advisory Mandates for clients across international markets.

- Mutual Fund - The Mutual Fund primarily targets retail investors.
- Portfolio Management Services - allows high net worth investors to invest in a more concentrated portfolio aiming at higher returns. In the year 2000, ICICI Prudential AMC was the first institutional participant to offer these service in India.
- Real Estate Business - targets high net worth investors and domestic institutional investors, with ICICI Prudential AMC starting the Real Estate Investment Series Portfolio in 2007.

== Competitor ==
ICICI Prudential Mutual Fund have major competition with SBI Mutual Fund and UTI Mutual Fund.

== Operations ==
As of June 30, 2026, ICICI Prudential AMC reported a customer base of over ₹1.73 crore unique investors.

== See also ==
- Mutual funds in India
