= Rohan Jaitley =

Indian lawyer

- Born: New Delhi
- Citizenship: India
- Education: Law Degree, Master of Laws (LL.M.) from Cornell University
- Alma mater: Amity University, Cornell University
- Occupations: Lawyer; cricket administrator
- Organization(s): Delhi & District Cricket Association
- Known for: President of the Delhi & District Cricket Association (DDCA)
- Title: President, Delhi & District Cricket Association
- Parents: Arun Jaitley (father); Sangeeta Jaitley (mother)
- Website: https://rohan-jaitley.com/

Rohan Jaitley is an Indian lawyer and administrator. He is currently the President of the Delhi & District Cricket Association (DDCA).

== Biography ==
=== Early life and education ===
Jaitley was born in New Delhi, India. He is the son of the late Arun Jaitley, a prominent lawyer and politician who served as India's Finance Minister. Rohan Jaitley obtained a law degree in India and a Master of Laws (LL.M.) from Cornell University.

=== Career ===
Jaitley is a practicing lawyer who primarily focuses on cases before the Supreme Court of India and the Delhi High Court. In March 2024, he was appointed as a Central Government Standing Counsel for the Delhi High Court.

Jaitley is also involved in cricket administration. He was elected unopposed as the President of the Delhi & District Cricket Association (DDCA) in 2023.

== Achievements ==
As president of the Delhi and District Cricket Association (DDCA), Rohan Jaitley successfully turned around the association's financial health. When he assumed leadership, DDCA had just Rs 85 lakh in reserves and outstanding dues of Rs 22 crore. Under his guidance, the association's finances improved significantly, including a Rs 100-crore fixed deposit and the investment of over Rs 70 crore to renovate the stadium for the 2023 World Cup.

Under Jaitley’s leadership, cricket now accounts for over 95% of DDCA's budget, and annual T20 revenues reached Rs 65 crore, highlighting a successful financial and operational turnaround.

In January 2025, Jaitley supported the Indian cricket team for the Physically Disabled (PD) Champions Trophy 2025. At a send-off ceremony in New Delhi, he distributed essential cricketing gear to the players, emphasizing their resilience and dedication.

== Controversies ==
In 2022, Jaitley faced allegations of sexual assault from a model who approached him for an emcee job during the Indian Premier League (IPL). These allegations have not been proven in court.
