= ICICI Home Finance Company =

Indian housing finance company

- Type: Private
- Industry: Housing Finance Company (HFC), Financial services, BFSI
- Founded: 1999
- Headquarters: Mumbai, India
- Area served: India
- Key people: Shalu Bansal (Managing Director & CEO)
- Products: Home loans, Loan against property, Fixed Deposits, Construction Finance
- Operating income: ₹ 1227.36 crore (2026)
- Total assets: ₹ 47,882.65 crore (2026)
- Number of employees: 5800 (2026)
- Parent: ICICI Bank Ltd
- Website: www.icicihfc.com

ICICI Home Finance Company (ICICIHFC) is an Indian public limited housing finance company (HFC), headquartered in Mumbai with branches in major cities across India. The company operates as a wholly owned subsidiary of ICICI Bank and is registered with the regulation authority of India - National Housing Bank (NHB). It provides home and commercial loans, loan against property, gold loans and accepts fixed deposits.

== History ==
The company was incorporated in 1999, under the Companies Act, 1956 as a wholly owned subsidiary of ICICI Bank. It was created by ICICI Bank to focus as a separate entity dedicated to provide housing finance. ICICI HFC is registered with National Housing Bank. The company operates all over the country and it has offices in all major cities across India.

ICICI HFC fixed deposits have received the highest ratings of MAAA by ICRA, FAAA by CRISIL and AAA rating from CARE.

== Awards ==
- 2019: ‘Mortgage and Home Loan Product of the Year – India’ from Asian Banking & Finance

== Product and services ==
ICICI HFC provides housing finance to individuals and corporates for purchase or construction of residential houses. In FY2026, the company has disclosed that it has disbursed over Rs.18,787.25 crore in housing loans in the country. It offers home loans, loan against property, fixed deposit and construction finance.

== Branch network ==
The company started with six branches in 2017 and as of 2026, it has over 248 branches in India.
