= Siddharth Sahib Singh =

Indian cricketer (born 1980)

Siddharth Sahib Singh Verma
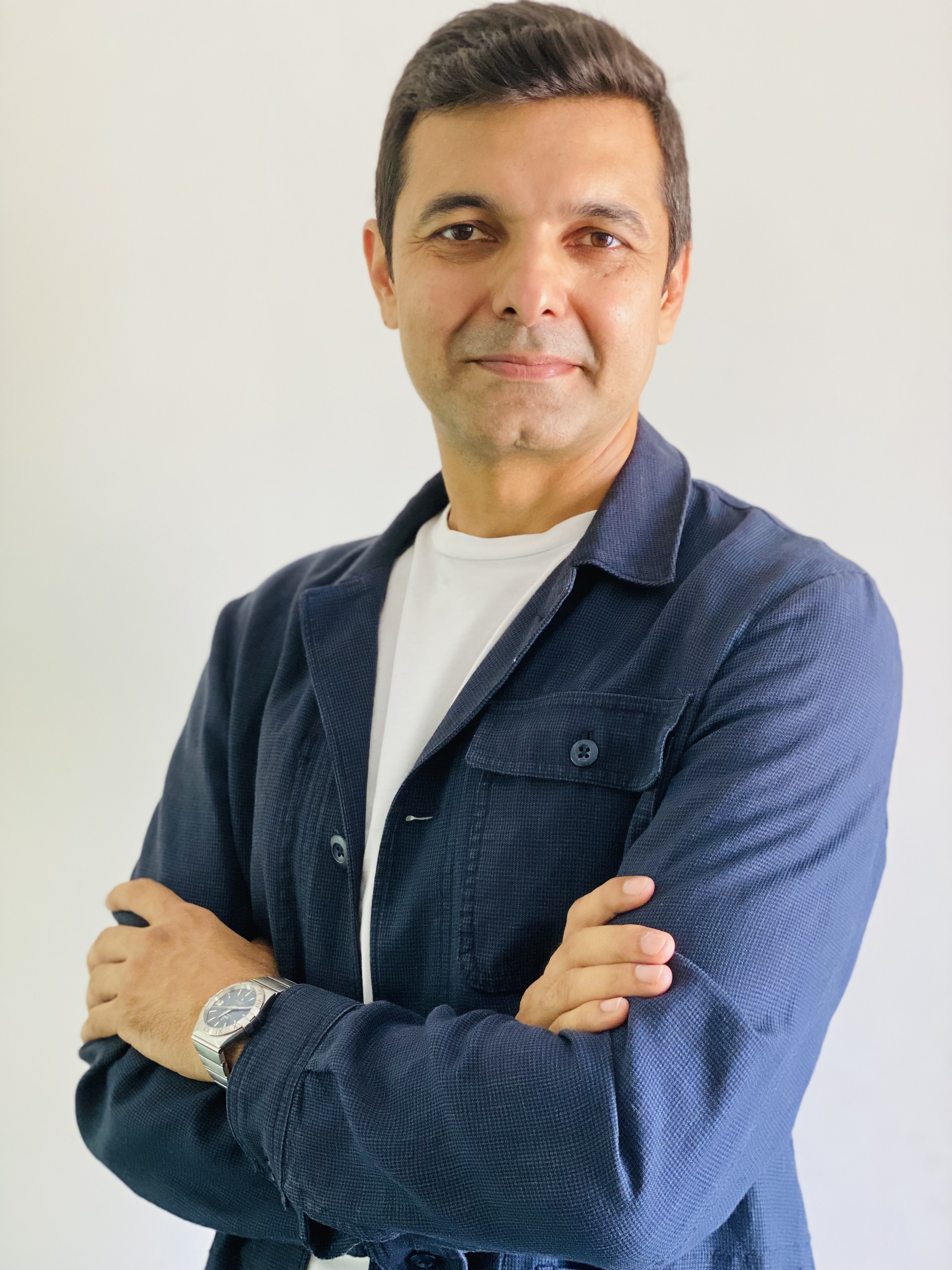

Personal information
- Born: 20 November 1980 (age 45); Delhi, India
- Batting: Right-handed
- Bowling: Right arm off break
- Source: Cricinfo, 12 April 2016

Siddharth Sahib Singh Verma, also known as Siddharth Verma, (born 20 November 1980) is an Indian former cricketer. He played first-class cricket for Delhi, Haryana and Railways between 2002 and 2007. He later worked for the Delhi and District Cricket Association (DDCA).

== See also ==
- List of Delhi cricketers
