= Bank of Rajasthan =

Private bank in India

The BANK OF RAJATHAN Ltd.
- Company type: Private
- Traded as: BSE: 500019; NSE: BANKRAJAS
- Industry: Banking, loan, capital markets
- Founded: 1943
- Defunct: 2010
- Fate: Merged with ICICI Bank
- Headquarters: Clock Tower, Udaipur, India
- Key people: G. Padmanabhan (MD & CEO)
- Products: Loans, Savings, Investment vehicles
- Revenue: ₹15,073.344 million (US$160 million) (year ended March 2009)
- Net income: ▲₹1,177.119 million (US$12 million) (March 2009)
- Website: www.bankofrajasthan.com

The Bank of Rajasthan Ltd (Hindi: बैन्क ओफ राजस्थान) was a private sector bank of India which merged with ICICI Bank in 2010.

== History ==
It was set up at Udaipur in 1943 with an initial capital of Rs. 10.00 lacs. An eminent industrialist named Seth Shri Govindram Seksaria was the founder chairman and Late Shri Dwarka Prasad Gupta was the first General Manager. It was classified as the Scheduled Bank in 1948. The Bank also established a rural (Gramin) bank Mewar Anchlik Gramin Bank in Udaipur District in Rajasthan on 26 January 1983.

The bank's central office is located at Jaipur, although its registered office is in Udaipur. Presently the bank has 463 branches, in 24 states, with 294 of the branches being in Rajasthan.

== Merger with ICICI Bank ==
RBI was critical of BOR's promoters not reducing their holdings in the company. BOR has been merged with ICICI Bank. ICICI paid Rs. 30 billion for it. Each 118 shares of BOR will be converted into 25 shares of ICICI Bank. dated 12 Oct 1998
