= Delhi & District Cricket Association =

Governing body of cricket in Delhi, India

- Sport: Cricket
- Jurisdiction: Regional
- Abbreviation: DDCA
- Founded: 1883
- Affiliation: Board of Control for Cricket in India
- Affiliation date: 1928; 98 years ago
- Headquarters: Arun Jaitley Stadium
- Location: Delhi
- President: Rohan Jaitley
- Secretary: Siddharth Sahib Singh

Official website
- www.ddca.in/index.php
- (India)

The Delhi & District Cricket Association (DDCA) is the governing body of cricket activities in Delhi, India. It is affiliated to the Board of Control for Cricket in India. The Delhi cricket team is the team for Delhi & District Cricket Association in the Ranji Trophy and other domestic tournaments. The DDCA is responsible for both men's and women's teams of U14, U16, U19, U23 and seniors.

In 2024, Rohan Jaitley was re-elected as DDCA president with 1,577 votes, compared with his nearest rival, Kirti Azad, who got 777 votes.

== Allegations ==
In 2015–16, BJP MP Kirti Azad and Delhi Chief Minister Arvind Kejriwal have alleged corruption in DDCA against Union Finance Minister Arun Jaitley. On 16 November 2019, Rajat Sharma, president DDCA resigned alleging irregularities after a tentur of nearly 20 months.
