= Gourab Banerji =

Additional Solicitor General of India

Gourab Banerji is a Senior Advocate appearing in varied cases before the Indian courts and in many domestic and international arbitrations in India and overseas. He is an alumnus of Cambridge University (1986-1989), from where he graduated with First Class Honours, and has been practicing in India since 1990. As an Additional Solicitor General of India in the Supreme Court (2009-2014), he represented the Union of India in many sensitive and landmark cases. Banerji has also been appointed amicus curiae by the Courts in several matters relating to land laws, international commercial arbitration, Supreme Court practice and procedure, as well as indirect tax. He is also an Overseas Associate at the Essex Court Chambers, London.

Gourab Banerji is the younger son of Milon Kumar Banerji, who was a former Attorney General of India, grandson of Birendra Narayan Chakraborty and a grand-nephew of Sachindranth Sanyal. His elder brother is also a senior Supreme Court Advocate Debal Banerji. His wife, Dr. Swapna Liddle, is an historian who has authored Chandni Chowk: The Mughal City of Old Delhi and Connaught Place and the Making of New Delhi.

He appears as counsel in a large number of domestic and international commercial arbitrations and investment arbitrations in India and overseas and routinely appears before the Indian courts on behalf of clients seeking enforcement of foreign awards. Apart from that, he has been appointed amicus curiae by the Courts in a number of matters relating to land laws, international commercial arbitration, Supreme Court practice and procedure, as well as indirect tax. He was designated as Senior Advocate in December 2003. Gourab Banerji was appointed as Additional Solicitor General for the Union of India in the year 2009. Gourab has represented the Government of India in a number of sensitive and landmark cases.

== See also ==
- Cairn Energy PLC & Cairn UK Holdings Limited v. The Republic of India
