= SBI Mutual Fund =

Indian bank sponsored fund house

- Type: Joint venture
- Industry: Investment management
- Founded: 29 June 1987; 39 years ago
- Headquarters: Mumbai, India
- Area served: India
- Key people: Debasish Mishra (MD & CEO); Denys de Campigneulles (Deputy CEO); Srinivas Jain (Joint CEO)
- Products: Asset Management; Wealth Management
- AUM: ▲₹1,119,756.6 crore (US$120 billion) (September 2024)
- Owner: State Bank of India (63%); Amundi (37%)
- Number of employees: 1000–1200
- Website: www.sbimf.com

SBI Mutual Fund is an Indian private asset management company introduced by the State Bank of India (SBI) and incorporated in 1987 with its corporate head office located in Mumbai, India. SBIFMPL is a joint venture between the State Bank of India, an Indian public sector bank, and Amundi, a European asset management company. A shareholder agreement in this regard has been entered on April 13, 2011, between SBI & AMUNDI Asset Management. Accordingly, SBI currently holds 63% stake in SBIFMPL and the 37% stake is held by AMUNDI Asset Management through a wholly owned subsidiary, Amundi India Holding. SBI & AMUNDI Asset Management shall jointly develop the company as an asset management company of international repute by adopting global best practices and maintaining international standards.

== History ==
The mutual fund industry in India originally began in 1963 with the Unit Trust of India (UTI) as a Government of India and the Reserve Bank of India initiative. Launched on 29 June 1987, SBI Mutual Fund became the first non-UTI mutual fund in India. In July 2004, State Bank of India decided to divest 37 per cent of its holding in its mutual fund arm, SBI Funds Management Pvt Ltd, to Societe Generale Asset Management, for an amount in excess of $35 million.

Post-divestment, State Bank of India's stake in the mutual fund arm came down to 67%. In May 2011, Amundi picked up 37% stake in SBI Funds Management, that was held by Societe Generale Asset Management, as part of a global move to merge its asset management business with Crédit Agricole.

SBI Funds Management Private Limited (SBIFMPL) has been appointed as the Asset Management Company of the SBI Mutual Fund. SBIFMPL is a joint venture between the State Bank of India, an Indian public sector bank, and Amundi, a European asset management company.

As of September, 2019, the fund house claims to serve 5,809,315 unique investors through approximately 212 branches PAN India. As of September 2021, the total AUM stands at Rs.579318.29 crores.

In July 2026, SBI Funds Management completed a US$1.03 billion initial public offering and began trading on the National Stock Exchange of India and Bombay Stock Exchange. The offering, India's largest IPO of 2026 at the time, attracted approximately US$31 billion in bids. Its shares ended their first trading session 6.2% above the issue price, valuing the company at nearly US$13 billion.

== Key milestones ==
- 1987 – Establishment of SBI Mutual Fund
- 1991 – Launch of SBI Magnum Equity Fund
- 1999 – Launch of sector funds, India's first contra fund: SBI Contra Fund
- 2001 – Involvement in Ketan Parekh Scam SBI Mutual Fund, according to the CBI charge-sheet, purchased 22 lakh shares at Rs 165 each in February 2000 through off-market deals from Ketan Parekh-controlled firms.[22]
- 2004 – Joint Venture with Societe General Asset Management
- 2006 – Became the first bank-sponsored fund to launch an offshore fund – SBI Resurgent India Opportunities Fund
- 2011 – Stake Transfer from SGAM to Amundi Asset Management
- 2013 – Acquisition of Daiwa Mutual Fund, part of the Tokyo-based Daiwa Securities Group
- 2013 – Launch of SBI Fund Guru, an investor education initiative
- 2015 – Employees' Provident Fund Organisation decided to invest in the equity market for the first time by investing Rs. 5,000 crore in the Nifty and Sensex ETFs (Exchange Traded Fund) of SBI Mutual Fund
- 2018 – First AMC in India to launch an Environment, Social and Governance (ESG) fund viz Magnum Equity ESG Fund
- 2018 – Signatory to the United Nations Principles for Responsible Investment (UN-PRI)

== Products and services ==
=== Equity ===
The company provides a broad range of equity funds, spanning diversified, thematic, and sector-based op and strategies. The offerings cater to both well-balanced approaches and targeted investments in particular themes or sectors. Overall, the company aims to meet diverse investor needs and financial goals.

=== Debt ===
The company has a robust product range matching all maturities for cash management. The focus of investment philosophy is primarily on the product's liquidity as well as on the quality of the securities held in the portfolio.

=== Hybrid ===
Hybrid Schemes invest in a mixture of multiple asset classes like debt, equity, and gold in different proportions based on the investment objective. The company has a suite of products across the risk-spectrum including a multi-asset offering that has gold in the portfolio into the traditional mix of equity and debt.

== Other Large Mutual Fund Houses ==
Some of the major competitors for SBI Mutual Fund in the mutual fund sector are Axis Mutual Fund, Birla Sun Life Mutual Fund, HDFC Mutual Fund, ICICI Prudential Mutual Fund, Kotak Mutual Fund, Nippon India Mutual Fund and UTI Mutual Fund .

== See also ==
- Mutual funds in India
- State Bank of India
