= ICICI-Videocon loan scam =

Financial scam

The ICICI-Videocon loan scam is about a criminal conspiracy by Chanda Kochhar as Managing Director of ICICI Bank who abused her position by sanctioning a ₹3,250 crore (US$696.34 million) loan to Venugopal Dhoot's Videocon International Electronics Limited (VIEL) between June 2009 and October 2011 to cheat the bank in lieu of illegal gratification and undue benefit received in NuPower Renewables Private Limited (NRPL), a company owned by Kocchar's husband, Deepak Kochhar.

== Investigation ==
In the course of its preliminary investigation, the Central Bureau of Investigation (CBI) discovered that between June 2009 and October 2011, ICICI Bank allegedly broke its own policies by authorising six loans totaling ₹1,875 crore to be given to companies affiliated with the Videocon Group. According to the investigation agency, the loans were declared to be non-performing assets in 2012, which resulted in a loss of ₹1,730 crore for the bank.

The CBI filed a chargesheet in April 2023 against Kochhar, her husband Deepak, Dhoot, and six other individuals. On June 26, 2023, the investigative agency presented their arguments to a special court, seeking acknowledgment and acceptance of the chargesheet.

== Arrests ==
On 23 December 2022, the CBI has taken into custody Chanda Kochhar as well as her husband, Deepak Kochhar. And by 26 December 2022, Venugopal Dhoot had also been arrested by the investigation agency. Dhoot reportedly made an offer to turn himself in as an approver in the case, as reported by local media sources.
