= Chanda Kochhar =

Indian businesswoman (born 1961)

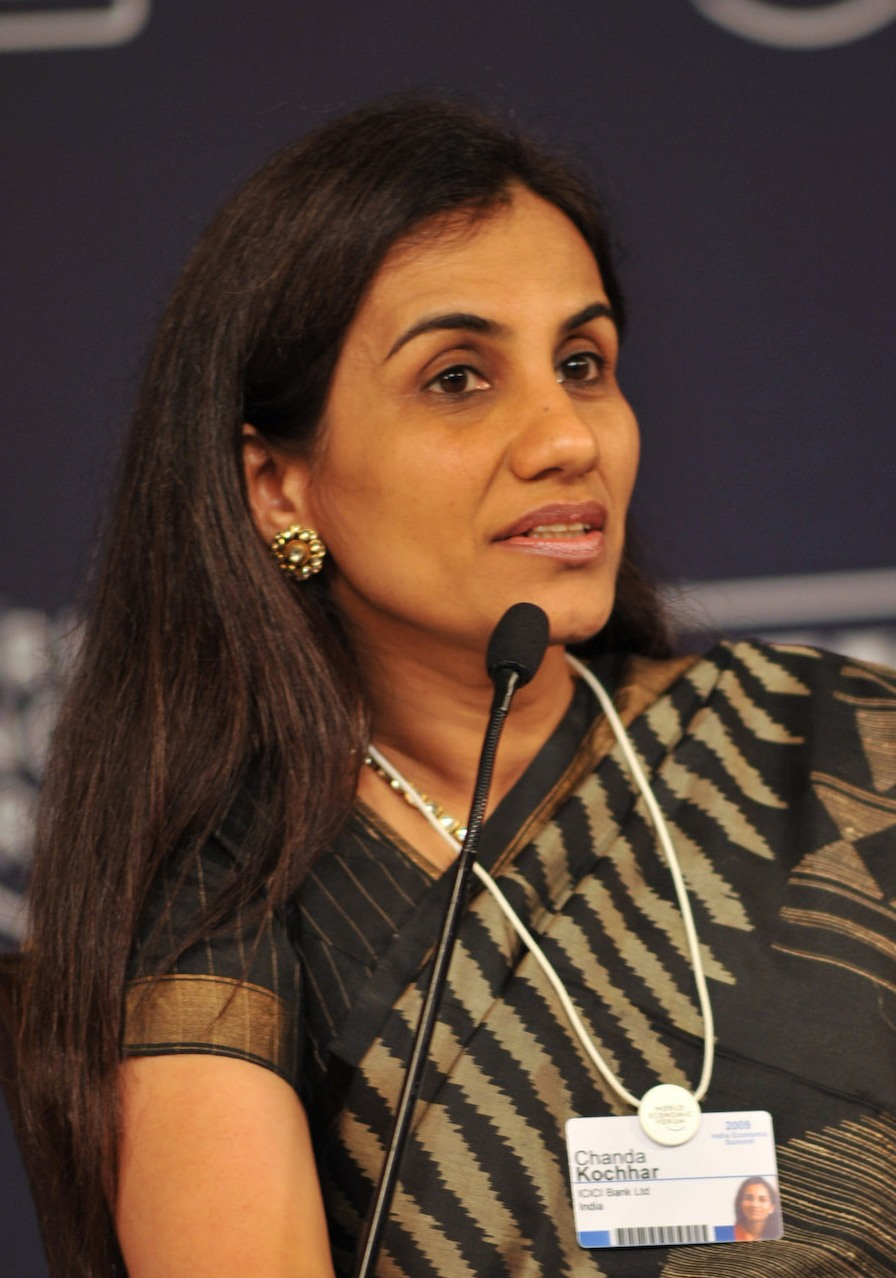
- Born: Chanda Advani; 17 November 1961 (age 64); Jodhpur, Rajasthan, India
- Education: Jai Hind College, Mumbai; Jamnalal Bajaj Institute of Management Studies, Mumbai
- Occupations: former MD and CEO of ICICI Bank
- Term: 2009–2018
- Predecessor: K. V. Kamath
- Successor: Sandeep Bakhshi
- Spouse: Deepak Kochhar
- Children: 2

Chanda Kochhar (née Advani, born 17 November 1961) is an Indian banker. She was the MD and CEO of ICICI Bank from 2009 to 2018 She resigned from her positions in 2018 due a case of conflict of interest. Subsequently, she was fired by ICICI Bank, a decision which was later upheld by the Supreme Court of India.

Kochhar is facing allegations of money laundering charges in India. She has been arrested by Central Bureau of Investigation in December 2022, in a case linked to alleged loan fraud charges. In 2019, the case has been filed for giving high-value loans to Videocon with conspiracy during 2009.

== Early life and education ==
Kochhar was born in Jodhpur, Rajasthan, in a Hindu Sindhi family. She studied at St. Angela Sophia School in Jaipur. She moved to Mumbai, where she joined Jai Hind College and earned a bachelor of commerce degree from University of Mumbai.

After graduating in 1982, she studied cost accountancy at the Institute of Cost Accountants of India and obtained a master of management studies degree at the University of Mumbai from the Jamnalal Bajaj Institute of Management Studies. She received the Wockhardt Gold Medal for Excellence in Management Studies as well as the J. N. Bose Gold Medal in Cost Accountancy.

== Career ==
=== 1984–1993 ===
In 1984, Kochhar joined the ICICI as a management trainee. During her early year at ICICI, she handled project appraisal and monitoring and evaluated projects in industries such as textile, paper and cement.

=== 1993–2009 ===
Kochhar was instrumental in establishing ICICI Bank during the 1990s. In 1993, Kochhar was appointed as one of the core team members who were assigned the responsibility of setting up the bank. She was promoted to assistant general manager (AGM) in 1994 and then to deputy general manager (DGM) in 1996.

In 1996, Kochhar was heading the newly formed Infrastructure Industry Group of ICICI Bank, which was formed to build industry expertise in the power, telecom and transportation industries.

In 1998, she was promoted as the General Manager (GM) and headed ICICI Bank's major client group, which handled relationships with ICICI's top 200 clients. In 1999, she also handled the strategy and e-commerce divisions of ICICI Bank.

Under Kochhar's leadership, ICICI Bank started building the nascent retail business in 2000 focusing largely on technology, innovation, process engineering and expansion of distribution and scale. In April 2001, she took over as executive director.

In 2006, Kochhar was appointed as deputy managing director of ICICI Bank. In 2006–07, Kochhar handled the international and corporate businesses of the bank. From 2007 to 2009, she was the bank's chief financial officer (CFO) and joint managing director.

=== 2009 to 2018 ===
In 2009 Kochhar was appointed as managing director and chief executive officer of the bank and was responsible for the bank's diverse operations in India and overseas. She also chaired the boards of most of the bank's subsidiaries, which included among the leading private sector life and general insurance companies in India.

Kochhar is a member of the India–Russia Business Leaders Forum and the US-India CEO Forum. Between 2015 and 2016, she was the president of the International Monetary Conference, an organization that organizes annual meetings that bring together chief executives from around 70 of the world's largest financial institutions spanning 30 countries, along with representatives from government institutions. She is the deputy chairman of the Indian Banks Association. She is on the boards of the National Institute of Securities Markets and Institute of International Finance. Kochhar has been a member of the Prime Minister's Council on Trade & Industry, the Board of Trade and High-Level Committee on Financing Infrastructure. She was co-chair of the World Economic Forum's Annual Meeting in 2011.

Kochhar received an honorary doctorate from Carleton University, Canada in 2014, in recognition of her pioneering work in the financial sector, effective leadership in a time of economic crisis and support for engaged business practices. She was conferred with the Padma Bhushan, one of India's highest civilian honours, in 2011.

Acting on a 2016 allegation of a shareholder of Videocon Group over a possible conflict of interest of Kochhar, ICICI Bank's board reviewed its credit approval process and found them strong and cleared Kochhar of the allegations. On 4 October 2018 she was forced to step down from her position as managing director and CEO of ICICI Bank, following a fresh complaint from an anonymous whistleblower. After an enquiry concluded that she had violated the bank's code of conduct regarding conflict of interest and due disclosure or recusal requirements, she was terminated from service. She tried to contest the termination by going to Supreme Court but it denied to oppose the petition contesting the High Court order which dismissed it.

== Recognition ==
Under Kochhar's leadership, ICICI Bank won the "Best Retail Bank in India" award in 2001, 2003, 2004 and 2005 and "Excellence in Retail Banking Award" in 2002; both awards were given by The Asian Banker. Kochhar personally was awarded "Retail Banker of the Year 2004 (Asia-Pacific region)" by the Asian Banker, "Business Woman of the Year 2005" by The Economic Times and "Rising Star Award" for Global Awards 2006 by Retail Banker International. Kochhar has also consistently figured in Fortune's list of "Most Powerful Women in Business" since 2005. She climbed up the list debuting with the 47th position in 2005, moving up 10 spots to 37 in 2006 and then to 33 in 2007. In the 2008 list, Kochhar features at the 25th spot. In 2009, she debuted at number 20 in the Forbes "World's 100 Most Powerful Women list". She is the second Indian in the list behind the Indian National Congress party chief Sonia Gandhi at number 13. In 2010, she fell to number 92 in the Forbes list, but in 2011 bounced back to 43. As of 2014, she ranks at #43. And in 2015 she climbed up to #35 again. In 2017, she was ranked at # 32 and she ranked the highest among the 5 Indian woman who made it on the list.

Kochhar has also consistently figured in Fortune's list of "Most Powerful Women in Business" since 2005. In 2009, she debuted at number 20 in the Forbes "World's 100 Most Powerful Women list", and climbed to the 10th spot in 2010. In 2011, she featured in Business Today's list of the "Most Powerful Women – Hall of Fame". In 2011, she also featured in the "50 Most Influential People in Global Finance" List of Bloomberg Markets. Chanda Kochhar was awarded with ASSOCHAM Ladies League Mumbai Women of the Decade Achievers Award on 2 January 2014.

In 2011, Kochhar was awarded the third highest civilian award the Padma Bhushan and the "ABLF Woman of Power Award (India)" at the Asian Business Leadership Forum Awards.

Kochhar was ranked as the most powerful businesswoman in India in Forbes' list of 'The World's 100 Most Powerful Women 2013'. Kochhar was also featured in the Power List 2013 of 25 most powerful women in India by India Today, for the third year in a row.

Kochhar was selected in Time magazine's list of the 100 Most Influential People in the World 2015. In 2015, she was ranked first in the Fortune List of 100 Most Powerful Women in Asia Pacific.

Kochhar ranked 40th on India Today's 'High and Mighty Power List 2016' in 2016. In the same year, she was 22nd in the Forbes Asia's '50 Power Businesswomen List 2016'. She was also listed in Forbes list of 'The World's Most Powerful Women in Finance 2016' at number 10.

In 2017, Kochhar was featured in Business World magazine's 'BW's Most Influential Women' list as an evergreen woman leader. In May of the same year, she received the Woodrow Wilson Award for Global Corporate Citizenship from the Woodrow Wilson Centre located in Washington, D.C., US. She is the first leader to receive an award in this category. In the same year, Kochhar was ranked 5th in Fortune's list of 'Most Powerful Women in business outside the U.S.'.

== Lending controversies ==
Kochhar allegedly favoured Videocon Group in lending practices under influence of Deepak Kochhar and his close aide Sunil Bhuta. ICICI Bank said it has decided to institute an independent enquiry into the allegations. On 29 March 2018, the Indian Express first reported that Videocon group promoter Venugopal Dhoot provided crores of rupees allegedly to NuPower Renewables Pvt Ltd (NRPL), a firm he had set up with Chanda Kochhar's husband Deepak Kochhar and two relatives six months after the Videocon group got ₹3,250 crore as loan from ICICI Bank in 2012.

He allegedly transferred proprietorship of the company to a trust owned by Deepak Kochhar for ₹9 lakh, six months after he received the loan from ICICI Bank. The Videocon account was declared an NPA (Non-performing Assets) or a bad loan in 2017 according to the report. "The Income Tax department is also probing the acquisition of the swanky family residence of Chanda Kochhar, the CEO and MD of ICICI Bank, in South Mumbai by her husband Deepak Kochhar in a complex transaction involving firms linked to Videocon Group", reported the Indian Express.

The Indian Express also reported similar transactions and favourable loans granted by Kochhar allegedly to the Essar Group, which was also later classified as NPAs. Chanda Kochhar subsequently quit ICICI bank following these allegations and is currently being investigated.

On 24 January 2019, Chanda, her husband Deepak, and industrialist Venugopal Dhoot were named in a CBI FIR for cheating and defrauding ICICI Bank to the tune of ₹1,730 crore. The Central Bureau of Investigation (CBI) detailed the modus operandi and charged them with offences punishable under Section 120B (conspiracy) and 420 (cheating) of IPC, section 7 (taking gratification) and 13(2) (criminal misconduct) read with 13(1)(d) (pecuniary advantage) of the Prevention of Corruption Act.

Following CBI action, the Enforcement Directorate (ED) lodged a case of money laundering against Chanda Kochhar in connection with loans disbursed by bank to the Videocon Group which later turned into NPAs. There are several public complaints sent to the Ministry of Finance, particular to the Union Finance Minister suggesting to withdraw esteemed civilian awards such as Padma Shri and Padma Bhushan awarded to Chanda by the Union Government of India. The Enforcement Directorate attached the properties of Chanda Kochhar and her family in connection with the money laundering case on 10 January 2020. The book value of the attached assets was ₹78 crore according to ED. Chanda Kochhar was granted bail by the special PMLA court in February following her appearance before the court and honouring the summons issued against her. She has never been arrested in the case. The ED on 24 August 2021, Tuesday, submitted draft charges against Chanda Kochhar, her businessman-husband and other accused in a special PMLA court in connection with a money laundering case. The Securities Appellate Tribunal (SAT) provided interim relief to Chanda Kochhar, against an order by markets regulator Securities and Exchange Board of India (SEBI) on 14 June 2022, for not supplying the requisite documents to Kochhar. SAT directed Kochhar to file a fresh application before SEBI indicating the documents being sought for inspection.

Chanda Kochhar and her husband Deepak Kochhar have been arrested by Central Bureau of Investigation on Friday, 23 December 2022, in a case linked to alleged loan fraud charges.

Chanda Kochhar, her husband, and Videocon Group's promoter, V N Dhoot, were charged with corruption in the Rs 3,250 crore loan fraud scam, in CBI's 11,000-page chargesheet lodged in late March 2023. On 26 June 2023 CBI said that Chanda Kochhar had conspired with the other accused and sanctioned credit facilities to the firms of the Videocon Group, which were ineligible for such loans. On 26 August 2009, a Rupee Term Loan (RTL) of Rs 300 crore was sanctioned to Videocon International Electronics Limited (VIEL) by the ICICI Bank. Out of the Rs 300 crore sanctioned to VIEL, Rs 64 crore was transferred by Dhoot to Deepak Kochhar's company. Thus, said CBI, Chanda accepted illegal gratification of Rs 64 crore as a reward and thereby misappropriated the bank's fund for her own use. Also, CBI argued that Chanda Kochhar got a flat in Churchgate transferred to her family trust, where Deepak was managing trustee, only for Rs 11 lakh in October 2016, whereas the flat was valued at Rs 5.25 crore in 1996.

In September 2023, Kochhar and her husband were granted bail. In September 2024, the Supreme Court requested a response from Kochhar and Deepak in regards to the CBI's petition that challenges the Bombay High Court's ruling that declared the Kocchar's arrest illegal. In November 2024, the Bombay High Court instructed the Serious Fraud Investigation Office (SFIO) to avoid any coercive measures against Kochhar and the court also mandated that any questioning of her should occur strictly within standard working hours. The court order was in response to Kocchar's plea that she and her husband should be treated as senior citizens and not be subjected to extended questioning in the investigations. In July 2025, an appellate tribunal confirmed a clear "quid pro quo" between former ICICI Bank CEO Chanda Kochhar and the Videocon Group, finding she received a ₹64 crore bribe for sanctioning a ₹300 crore loan, upholding the Directorate of Enforcement (ED) case under the PMLA. The tribunal found that funds were routed to her husband's company, invalidating her defense of ignorance and confirming the money laundering charges related to these illegal gains.

== Personal life ==
Kochhar resides in Mumbai, and is married to Deepak Kochhar, a wind energy entrepreneur and her business schoolmate. They have two children, a daughter and a son.

== See also ==
- Chitra Ramkrishna
