= Sandeep Bakhshi =

Indian banker

- Born: 28 May 1960 (age 66)
- Education: Punjab Engineering College; XLRI - Xavier School of Management
- Occupation: Banker
- Title: MD and CEO, ICICI Bank
- Term: October 2018
- Predecessor: Chanda Kochhar
- Relatives: Mona Bakshi Children: Minal Bakshi Esha Bakshi Shivam Bakshi

Sandeep Bakhshi (born 28 May 1960) is an Indian banker, and the MD & CEO, ICICI Bank since October 2018.

== Early life ==
Bakhshi earned a degree in mechanical engineering from Punjab Engineering College, Chandigarh, and has a postgraduate degree in management from XLRI - Xavier School of Management, Jamshedpur.

== Career ==
Bakhshi, an employee of ICICI since 1986, was appointed as MD & CEO in October 2018. Prior to this, he was the managing director and CEO of ICICI Prudential Life Insurance from August 2010 to June 2018 and MD and CEO for ICICI Lombard General Insurance Company in April 2002.

In August 2019 he was reported to be one of the highest paid CEOs of any Indian bank with a monthly salary of ₹22 lakh (US$23,000).
