= Mangala Area =

Oilfield in India

Mangala Area (Mangala, Bhagyam and Aishwariya Fields)
- Location within India
- Country: India
- Block: RJ-ON-90-2
- Offshore/onshore: Onshore
- Coordinates: 25.9586495°N 71.5095209°E
- Operators: Cairn India
- Partners: Oil and Natural Gas Corporation

Field history
- Discovery: 1999
- Start of production: Nov 2005
- Abandonment: 2041 (expected)

Production
- Current production of oil: 200,000 barrels per day (~1.0×10^{7} t/a)
- Estimated oil in place: 3,600 million barrels (~4.9×10^{8} t)
- Producing formations: Tertiary, Palaeocene, Fatehgarh

The Mangala Area, located in Block RJ-ON-90-1 (the Rajasthan Block), is a major oil field located in the Indian State of Rajasthan. The Mangala area consists of over 16 separate oil and gas fields of which the majority of the reserves are located in the three fields of Mangala, Bhagyam and Aishwariya. The Mangala Area sits in Barmer Basin and is thought to contain oil in place volumes of 3.6 billion barrels (570,000,000 m^{3}), of which 1 billion barrels (160,000,000 m^{3}) are thought to be recoverable. Cairn India is the operator of the field, a subsidiary of Vedanta Group.

== Field participation history ==
Royal Dutch Shell won the licensing round for Block RJ-ON-90-1 in 1992 from the Indian Government, entering into a Production Sharing Contract (PSC) with them.

In 1998, Royal Dutch Shell sunk a well in the area and put a logging tool probe (which detects hydrocarbons) down the bore. However, the electronic readings came up negative. A worker for Cairn Energy at the site (which then held a 10% stake in the leasehold) noticed that the probe was actually dripping in oil. - This was later found to be oil from the calibration run, inserted to the well at ground level to test the logging tool.

27% of this contract was then sold to Cairn Energy in 1998 in return for covering some historical costs and drilling the next exploration well. Cairn's stake increased to 50% in 1999 by offering in exchange to fund the second exploration well.

Subsequently, Cairn purchased 40% of Shell's leaseholding and the remaining 50% in 2002 for $7.25 million.

$100 million was spent by Cairn Energy on wells. In January 2004, 3.7 billion barrels of oil equivalent was found in Mangala, making it 2004's biggest discovery of on-shore oil in the world.

In 2005 the national Indian oil company ONGC exercised their right as part of the terms of the PSC to acquire a 30% stake in the two larger fields discovered to date. The company retains this option on all further discoveries in the block. 2006 saw a restructuring of Cairn Energy into three companies, Cairn Energy, Cairn India and Capricorn Energy. Block RJ-ON-90-1 was included in the assets of Cairn India, which was floated on the Indian stock market in the same year, raising almost $2 billion.

== Reservoir properties ==
Despite containing a massive 3.6 billion barrels (570,000,000 m^{3}) of in-situ oil, the recovery factor for the field is roughly around 30%, giving it reserves of approximately 1 billion barrels (160,000,000 m^{3}). This level of recovery is a result of the properties of the oil rather than to do with the geological settings of the reservoir which can often hamper recovery factors. The oil has an API gravity of between 25 and 30, which makes it slightly heavier than Brent Crude at 38 API. However, more importantly, the oil is very waxy. This waxiness causes it to be a solid at room temperature (20 °C, which is much lower than typical daytime temperatures of Mangala). Brent crude typically has a pour point at 3 °C while Mangala oil has a pour point of 42 °C.

To assist with increasing the recovery factor, two types of Enhanced Oil Recovery (EOR) are being evaluated which could increase the recovery by up to 25%. The less riskier and costly of them would be to undertake a Polymer flood instead of a traditional water flood. This is strategy is not very dependent on the oil price, well location or extensive testing. The other option is to undertake Alkaline-Surfactant-Polymer flooding (ASP). ASP flooding would be riskier in terms of costs, well spacing, development time (five years), and would be more sensitive to the oil price. However, the rewards for it are significantly higher, potentially increasing the incremental reserves by 25% when compared to polymer or water flooding.

== Exploration and development ==
Cairn (and previously Shell) have drilled 184 wells during the exploration stage, of which 22 were discoveries, the most significant being the Mangala discovery well which confirmed the field's large reserves. The well intersected two separate reservoirs with a total oil column of 320 meters.

Cairn India expects to drill in excess of 100 wells developing the fields in the Mangala Area. First production was scheduled to begin in 2007; however, this has thought to have slipped to 2009 due to the tight oil market for equipment and services.

Peak production was expected to plateau at 175,000 barrels per day (27,800 m^{3}/d). It is now expected to be 250,000 barrels per day.

India-based Oil and Natural Gas (ONGC) has given nod for its $560m project to improve oil recovery at Mangala oilfield in Rajasthan.
