= Capricorn Energy =

Extractive oil and gas company

Capricorn Energy plc
- Type: Public limited company
- Traded as: LSE: CNE
- Industry: Oil and gas
- Founded: 1981
- Headquarters: Edinburgh, Scotland, UK
- Key people: Maria Gordon (Chair); Randy Neely (CEO)
- Products: Petroleum, natural gas and other petrochemicals
- Revenue: ▼$134.9 million (2025)
- Operating income: ▼$5.7 million (2025)
- Net income: ▲$19.0 million (2025)
- Website: www.capricornenergy.com

Capricorn Energy plc (formerly Cairn Energy plc) is a British oil and gas exploration and development company based in Edinburgh, Scotland.

The company is listed on the London Stock Exchange.

== History ==
The company was founded in 1981 by Sir Bill Gammell, the former international Rugby player, his father James (Jimmy), his brother Pete and others, as Cairn Energy. Its initial operations were in the USA and, following its listing on the London Stock Exchange in 1988, it expanded into the UK North Sea and internationally (Papua New Guinea, Spain, Vietnam, China and Australia). The company acquired Conoco's UK onshore acreage in 1988 and became one of the largest operators of UK onshore oil production with the Palmers Wood oil field just south of London, near Junction 6 of the M25, and at Humbly Grove (near Basingstoke).

The company expansion started with a substantial (non-operated) gas discovery (East Cameron 331) Bangladesh near Chittagong, in 1996. In parallel, the company launched a series of takeovers of public listed companies – Teredo Petroleum in 1994, Holland Sea Search NV in 1995 and Command Petroleum in 1996.

In 1996, the company farmed out a 25% interest in the Sangu field to Halliburton in return for Halliburton bearing a 50% share of the development costs. In 1997, it sold half of all its Bangladeshi interests to Royal Dutch Shell in return for Shell assuming a $330 million carry of the company's exploration and development costs. This agreement gave the company an interest in Shell's huge acreage position in Rajasthan onshore in North West India. The company drilled two unsuccessful exploration wells and Shell then sold its 50% share to the company for $7.5 million: the company's third well, now 100% owned, found the Mangala oil field.

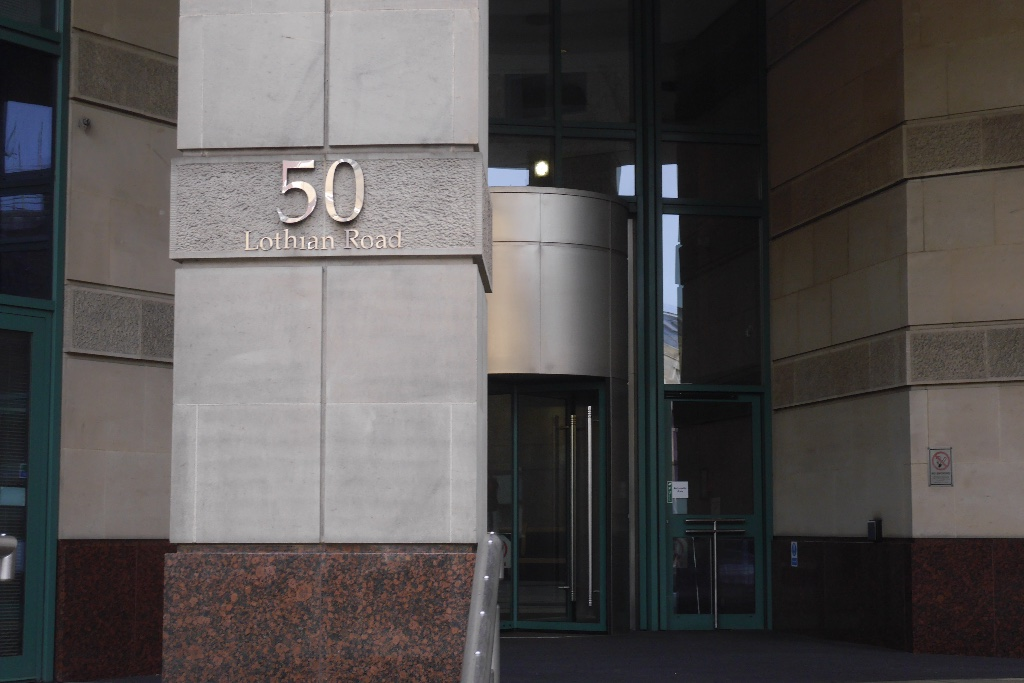
Capricorn Energy offices in Lothian Road, Edinburgh

In December 2010, the company agreed to sell a stake of 58.5% of Cairn India, its India-focused subsidiary, to Vedanta Resources for $8.67 billion. Talks between the two companies started in August 2010. However, approval did not come from the Indian government until September 2011 and the deal had to be restructured.

The company sold an additional 3.5 per cent of its shares in its Cairn India for about US$360 million in June 2012. In March 2014, the company announced that Bill Gammell would step down as chairman after the annual general meeting on 15 May 2014.

The company changed its name from Cairn Energy to Capricorn Energy on 13 December 2021.

The company agreed to an offer, which valued the company at $396 million, from DNO ASA in September 2026.

== Operations ==
The company holds a portfolio of onshore development and production assets in the Egyptian Western Desert.

== Dispute ==
In 2006-2007, after Cairn UK transferred shares of Cairn India Holdings to its Indian counterpart Cairn India, it refused to pay capital gains tax in India. In response, the Indian government in 2012 made any capital gains resulting for the transfer of shares from a foreign entity whose assets were located in Indian taxable from 1962 retrospectively.

In December 2020, the Permanent court of Arbitration at the Hague, awarded Cairn Energy $1.7bn in costs and damages, and in July 2021, a French court ordered a freeze on Indian Government properties in Paris and gave Cairn Energy the right to seize aircraft belonging to Air India.
