= Cairn India =

Indian oil and gas exploration and production company

Cairn Oil & Gas
- Type: Private
- Industry: Oil and gas
- Founded: 2006; 20 years ago
- Fate: Merged with Vedanta Limited
- Headquarters: ASF Center Tower A, 62-363, Jwala Mill Road, PHASE IV, Udyog Vihar, Sector 18, Gurugram, Haryana, 122016, India
- Area served: India, Sri Lanka and South Africa
- Key people: Prachur Sah (deputy CEO); Navin Agarwal (chairman)
- Products: oil and gas
- Revenue: ▼₹10,633.99 crore (US$1.1 billion) (2016)
- Operating income: ▼₹−9,434.63 crore (US$−1.0 billion) (2016)
- Net income: ▼₹−9,431.88 crore (US$−1.0 billion) (2016)
- Total assets: ▼₹56,495.57 crore (US$6.0 billion) (2016)
- Total equity: ▼₹48,792.54 crore (US$5.2 billion) (2016)
- Number of employees: 1001–5000
- Subsidiaries: List: 1. Cairn India Holdings Limited 2. Cairn Energy Holdings Limited 3. Cairn Energy Hydrocarbons Limited 4. Cairn Exploration (No.7) Limited 5. Cairn Exploration (No.6) Limited 6. Cairn Exploration (No.4) Limited 7. Cairn Exploration (No.2) Limited 8. Cairn Energy Gujarat Block 1 Limited 9. Cairn Energy Discovery Limited 10. Cairn Petroleum India Limited 11. Cairn Energy Cambay B.V. 12. Cairn Energy India West B.V. 13. Cairn Energy Gujarat B.V. 14. Cairn Energy India Holdings B.V. 15. Cairn Energy Group Holdings B.V. 16. Cairn Energy Netherlands Holdings B.V. 17. Cairn Energy Gujarat Holding B.V. 18. Cairn Energy India West Holding B.V. 19. Cairn Energy Cambay Holding B.V. 20. Cairn Energy Australia Pty Limited 21. CEH Australia Limited 22. Cairn Energy Asia Pty Limited 23. Cairn Energy Investments Australia Pty Limited 24. Wessington Investments Pty Limited 25. Sydney Oil Company Pty Limited 26. Cairn Energy India Pty Limited 27. CEH Australia Pty Limited 28. CIG Mauritius Private Limited 29. CIG Mauritius Holdings Private Limited 30. Cairn Lanka (Pvt) Limited
- Website: www.cairnindia.com

Cairn India was an Indian oil and gas exploration and production company, headquartered in Gurgaon, India. The company was merged with Vedanta Limited.

== History ==
In early 1999, Cairn made the first Rajasthan discovery – Guda field, followed by Saraswati in 2001. Mangala was their biggest discovery in 2003, followed by Raageshwari, Bhagyam, Aishwariya, Kaameshwari and GR-F fields in Rajasthan. In 2003, Cairn acquired 100% of the exploration interest and took over as the operator of the block.

In 2007, Cairn India was listed on the National Stock Exchanges. Top 250 Global Energy Company Rankings by Platts, ranked Cairn India for being the World's fastest-growing energy company in 2011. Now the Company plans to invest $3 billion in the next three years in finding more oil and raising output from Rajasthan oilfields.

The company was delisted from the NSE and the BSE on 25 April 2017 following its merger with its parent company Vedanta Limited.

== Cairn – Vedanta deal ==
Vedanta Resources initially reached an agreement to acquire 58.8% of Cairn India from Cairn Energy for a total consideration of $8.67 billion in August 2010, with final shareholder approval in December.

== Vedanta ownership ==
While waiting on government approval on its agreement with Cairn Energy, Vedanta acquired an additional 18.5% on the open market including a 10.4% stake from Petronas for $1.5 billion.

== Operations ==
=== Andhra Pradesh ===
The Ravva oil and gas field in the Krishna- Godavari Basin was developed in partnership with Cairn India, ONGC, Videocon and Ravva Oil, under a production sharing contract (PSC) that runs until 2019. Currently, eight unmanned offshore platforms are being operated. A 225-acre onshore processing facility at Surasaniyanam processes natural gas and crude oil from the Ravva field. The Ravva onshore terminal operates to the internationally environmental standard – ISO 14001 – and has the capacity to handle 70,000 barrels (11,000 cubic metres) of oil per day, 95 million ft^{3} (2.7 million m^{3}) per day at standard conditions of natural gas and 110,000 bbl (17,000 m^{3}) per day of injection water. The terminal also has the capacity to store 1 million bbl (160 thousand m^{3}) of crude oil onshore.

The Ravva field has produced more than 253 million bbl (40.2 million m^{3}) of crude and sold 317 billion ft^{3} (9.0 billion m^{3}) of gas; about thrice the initial estimates. During the financial year, the plant uptime was 99.7% demonstrating superb operational efficiency. The asset recorded 1.61 million LTI free hours during the year. The offshore production platform at Ravva received the Oil Industry Safety Award for the year 2010–11.

=== Gujarat ===
In 2002, gas production commenced from the Lakshmi gas field, which is situated in Block CB/OS-2 in the Cambay Basin of the west coast of India in the Gulf of Khambhat. The Gauri offshore gas field was discovered in 2001 and came on-stream in 2004. CB-X, a marginal gas field in the transition zone of the CB/OS-2 block was in production between June 2007 and August 2009. The Lakshmi and Gauri fields commenced production of oil in addition to its gas production in 2005. The CB/OS-2 Block has completed 10 years of production and crossed a cumulative production of over 50 million barrels (7.9 million cubic metres) of oil equivalent hydrocarbons. Safety and operational integrity have been a strong area of focus for the CB/OS-2 asset operations team. The asset team recorded 0.93 million Lost Time Incident (LTI) free hours and delivered facilities uptime of 99.9% during the financial year 2012–13. The block has recorded more than nine million safe work hours over the last seven years.

=== Rajasthan ===
The Mangala field in Rajasthan, which was discovered in January 2004, is the largest onshore oil discovery in India in more than 20 years. The Mangala, Bhagyam and Aishwariya (MBA) fields have gross recoverable oil reserves and resources of over one bn boe. This includes proven plus probable (2P) gross reserves and resources of 636 mm boe with a further 308 mm boe or more of EOR resource potential.

The Mangala, Bhagyam and Aishwariya (MBA) fields have gross recoverable oil reserves and resources of approximately one billion barrels. Production from the Rajasthan Block currently contributes more than 23% of India's domestic production. Cairn India plans to drill in excess of 450 wells in the Rajasthan block over a three-year period; includes 100 Exploration and Appraisal (E&A) wells and the balance as development wells to sustain and enhance production volumes. Cairn India made its 26th discovery in the RJ-ON-90/1 block in Rajasthan. Oil Discovery in Rajasthan Cairn India's renewed exploration efforts resulted in an oil discovery, the 26th discovery so far in the RJ-ON-90/1 block, following recent policy clarity by Government of India (GoI) to conduct exploration activity in development blocks. The Management Committee approved the exploration work programme for the RJON-90/1 block on 14 February 2013, post which Cairn India, the Operator of the block, commenced the drilling of its first Exploration well, Raageshwari-South-1, on 25 February 2013 located in the southern part of the block.

Mangala: At Mangala, a total of 148 development wells have been drilled and completed with 96 producers and 33 injectors operationalised. The company has successfully drilled and completed 11 horizontal wells at MangalaMangala field is producing at plateau rates; infill wells are planned this year for sustaining and extending plateau andgoing forward, the Company intends to bring other wells on stream in a staged manner. Bhagyam: Bhagyam is the second largest field in the Rajasthan block, with an approved production plateau of 40,000 barrels (6,400 m^{3}) of oil per day. A total of 62 development wells have been drilled till date with 21 producers and four injectors operational; 12 producer wells are yet to be drilled. Bhagyam field is expected to ramp up to approved rate in H2 FY2013-14; and additional wells are planned this year. Both Mangala and Bhagyam are connected to the Mangala Processing Terminal (MPT), which processes the crude oil from the Rajasthan fields.

Aishwariya: The Aishwariya field is the third largest discovery in the Rajasthan block. Following an assessment of higher production potential and design optimisation due to increased reserves and resources, Cairn India has commenced development work in the field. Now Aishwariya field has commenced oil production and is the fifth oil field in the Rajasthan block to come online. The oil production from Aishwariya field was inaugurated on 23 March 2013, by the Hon’ble Minister of Petroleum and Natural Gas, Dr M VeerappaMoily in Barmer, Rajasthan in the presence of the Hon’ble Chief Minister Shri Ashok Gehlot, the Hon’ble Union Minister of State of Petroleum and Natural Gas Smt. P. Lakshmi. The field will achieve a gradual and safe ramp up to reach the currently approved FDP rate of 10,000 barrels (1,600 m^{3}) of oil per day.

Raageshwari Deep Gas Field: The Raageshwari Deep Gas field is meant to supply gas to meet the energy requirements at the MPT and the Mangala Development Pipeline, which runs approximately 670 km from Barmer to Viramgam to Salaya and then on to Bhogat, near Jamnagar, on the Arabian Sea coast. Saraswati and Raageshwari Fields: The Saraswati Field, which commenced production in May 2011, is currently producing at a rate of 250 barrels (40 m^{3}) of oil per day. Till date, it has produced over 75,000 barrels (11,900 m^{3}) of oil. This oil is processed at the MPT, and blended with the Mangala oil which is sold through the pipeline. The marginal oil field at Raageshwari also commenced production in March 2012. The Raageshwari and Saraswati fields continue to cumulatively contribute over 500 barrels (79 m^{3}) of oil per day towards the total production from the block. Cairn India plans to drill in excess of 450 wells in the Rajasthan block over a three-year period; includes 100 Exploration and Appraisal (E&A) wells and the balance as development wells to sustain and enhance production. Cairn India commenced gas sales from the Raageshwari field on 23 March.

=== Commencement of sale of gas – Rajasthan Block ===
On 23 March 2013, The Cairn-ONGC Joint Venture (JV) commenced commercial sale of gas from the Rajasthan Block (RJ-ON-90/1). Initial commercial volumes will be about 5 million cubic feet (140 thousand cubic metres) at standard conditions per day. The gas sales was inaugurated by the Hon’ble Minister of Petroleum and Natural Gas, Dr M VeerappaMoily in Barmer, Rajasthan in the presence of the Hon’ble Chief Minister Shri Ashok Gehlot, the Hon’ble Union Minister of State of Petroleum and Natural Gas Smt. P. Lakshmi. The RJ-ON-90/1 block currently produces about 30 million ft^{3} (850 thousand m^{3}) of gas per day from the Raageshwari Deep Gas field and as associated gas along with crude oil from the Mangala and Bhagyam fields. The continued exploration program in the block targets several other gas prospects that are expected to add to the production of natural gas from the block over the years. This is expected to pave the way in future for developing the state of Rajasthan as a gas-based economy.

=== Midstream operations ===
The Mangala Processing Terminal: The Mangala Processing Terminal (MPT) spread over an area of 1.6 km^{2} and is located 40 km from the nearest town, Barmer. The MPT processes crude oil extracted from the Rajasthan fields. Following the processing, the crude oil is transported to distant consumer refineries through a 24 inches (61 cm) diameter continuously heated and insulated pipeline. The MPT integrated production facilities support FDP approved production of 175,000 barrels (27,800 m^{3}) of oil per day.

The Mangala Development Pipeline: The Mangala Development Pipeline (MDP) is the world's longest continuously heated and insulated pipeline and will have access to 75% of India's refining capacity. The MDP originates from Mangala Processing Terminal (MPT) in the Mangala Field and passes through two states (Rajasthan and Gujarat), eight districts and travels up to ~670 km before it reaches its end at the coastal location of Bhogat near Jamnagar on the western coast line of India. About 154 km of the pipeline is in Rajasthan and the rest in Gujarat. The MDP is a 24 inches (61 cm) crude oil pipeline which is using Skin Effect Heat Management System (SEHMS) to ensure that the crude oil remains above the Wax Appearance Temperature (WAT) of 65 Deg C, through the pipeline. It has 8 inches (20 cm) gas line which feeds gas to all the ~36 Above Ground Installations located at every ~ 18 km distance along the pipeline which produces the necessary power to keep the pipeline at the required temperature. The gas needed to fire the boilers and, more importantly, to generate the power to heat the waxy crude at an average of 65-degree Celsius along the pipeline, comes from the Raageshwari gas field, located 90 km away from the MPT.

In addition, there is an intermediate terminal at Viramgam for storage and further pumping to the coast, including a pigging facility. There are two other pigging stations at Sanchore and Wankaner to insert 'pigs' (pipeline cleaning devices) that are used to clean and inspect the pipeline. The pipeline crosses all major crude oil carrier pipelines in the Western part of India and thus, offers potential of blending the Rajasthan crude with these large crude carrier lines. As it terminates at coastal location, the marine facilities are designed to load the crude oil carriers to transport the crude oil to other coastal refiners as well.

The pipeline also incorporates the first of its kind Pipeline Intrusion Detection System. This provides security along the entire length, utilising a fibre optic electronic vibration system that generates an alarm. This is linked to a central control unit via a Geographic Information System (GIS)-based mapping system. The entire length of the pipeline is monitored at the MPT, Viramgam and Bhogat terminals for flow, temperature, pressure, and other operational parameters.

Phase 1 of the pipeline construction from MPT to Salaya, in Gujarat, includes spur lines to connect to private refiners and another spur line at Radhanpur to connect with the Indian Oil Corporation Limited's (IOCL's) Mundra to Panipat crude pipeline. Since then, oil was introduced in the pipeline on 13 May 2010 and has begun commercial sales to IOCL and private refiners. The pipeline construction from Barmer to Salaya was completed in a record time of 18 months. Phase II: From Salaya to the Bhogat terminal on the Arabian Sea coast, and a pipeline connecting the terminal to the marine facilities is under construction

=== Sri Lanka ===
The Block SL 2007-01-001 was awarded to Cairn Lanka Private Limited, the wholly owned subsidiary of Cairn India. Cairn Lanka commenced its 3D seismic survey in the Mannar Basin in Sri Lanka on 10 December 2009 and the data is currently being processed. The acquisition programme, which was launched by the Honourable President of Sri Lanka, Mahinda Rajapaksa, fulfilled the commitment of 1450 km2 of 3D seismic data acquisition. The Mannar basin is an under-explored frontier basin, with both structural and stratigraphic plays.

The drillship 'Chikyu' was mobilised and three well exploration drilling campaign in the SL 2007-01-001 block commenced in August 2011. Cairn Lanka's drilling programme is the first successful programme in Sri Lanka in 30 years and has established a working petroleum system in the frontier Mannar Basin.

The drilling of the phase-II exploration well has been completed in February, 2013. The well encountered high quality reservoir sands; however these sands were water bearing. The well was plugged and abandoned and the rig was demobilized. The results of the well are being integrated with reprocessed 3D seismic data to finalize the forward programme which includes the options for appraisal of the existing two discoveries and entering exploration phase-III.

=== South Africa ===
Cairn India has acquired an exploration block in South Africa ('Block 1') and has signed a farm-in agreement with PetroSA, the South African National Oil Company, Block 1 covers a large area of 19,922 km2 and is currently in the initial stages of exploration. It has an existing gas discovery and identified oil & gas leads and prospects. Located in the geologically proven Orange Basin along the northwestern maritime border of South Africa with Namibia, the block is on trend with the discovered Kudu and Ibhubesi gas fields. Cairn India will hold a 60% interest in the block and will be the Operator, while PetroSA will hold the remaining interest. Government approval has been received for transfer and assignment of PetroSA's Participating Interest (PI) to Cairn in Block 1. The assignment agreement was executed in February, 2013. The 3D survey acquisition commenced in March, 2013 and is likely to be completed within this quarter. As on date more than 80% of the survey has been completed. kl;

== Sponsorships ==
Cairn India has Co-sponsored the Indian Hockey senior teams for a tenure of three years. This association, for a sum of several crores per annum, will cover the senior and junior national men and women teams. Cairn India announced the three-year association with Hockey India in the presence of Hockey India officials and the captains of the men and women hockey teams. Cairn India also sponsors a Marathon in December month of every year by the name of Cairn PinkCity Half Marathon takes place in Jaipur.

== Awards and recognition ==
- Winner of 2012 Platts Top 250 Global Energy Company award for the Fastest growing company in Asia and the World
- Winner of 2012 FICCI Safety Excellence award for Manufacturing conferred to Ravva Asset
- Winner of 2012 PetroFed award for O&G Pipeline Transportation Company of the Year
- Winner of Blue Dart Global CSR Award, 2012
- Winner of 2011 Spotlight Awards by League of American Communications Professionals
- Cairn India awarded 'Superbrand' status, 2011
