= ICICI Bank =

Indian private sector bank

ICICI Bank Limited

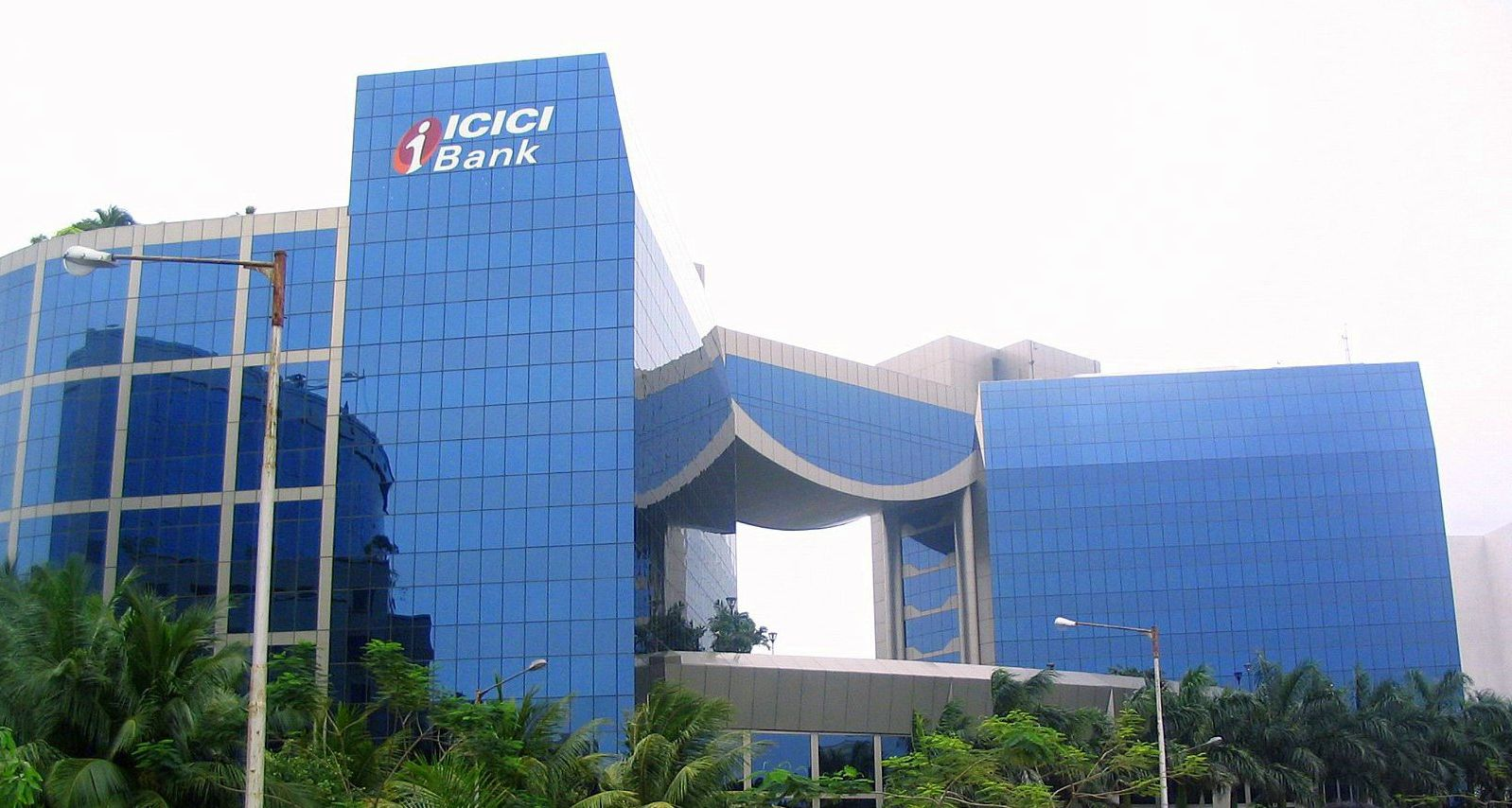
- Headquarters in Bandra Kurla Complex, Mumbai
- Formerly: Industrial Credit and Investment Corporation of India
- Type: Public
- Traded as: BSE: 532174; NSE: ICICIBANK; NYSE: IBN; BSE SENSEX constituent; NSE NIFTY 50 constituent
- ISIN: INE090A01021
- Industry: Financial services
- Founded: 5 January 1955; 71 years ago
- Headquarters: Mumbai, Maharashtra, India (corporate office) Vadodara, Gujarat, India (registered office)
- Number of locations: 7,656 (September 2026)
- Area served: Worldwide
- Key people: Pradeep Kumar Sinha (Part-time Chairman); Sandeep Bakhshi (MD & CEO)
- Products: Consumer banking; Commercial banking; Insurance; Credit cards; Investment banking; Mortgage loans; Private banking; Private equity; Investment management; Asset management; Wealth management; Stockbroking
- Revenue: ▲₹312,118 crore (US$32 billion) (2026)
- Operating income: ▲₹82,696 crore (US$8.6 billion) (2026)
- Net income: ▲₹54,208 crore (US$5.6 billion) (2026)
- Total assets: ▲₹29.14 lakh crore (US$300 billion) (2026)
- Total equity: ▲₹3.59 lakh crore (US$37 billion) (2026)
- Number of employees: ▼1,24,324 (2026)
- Subsidiaries: ICICI Prudential Life Insurance; ICICI Prudential Mutual Fund; ICICI Lombard; ICICI Securities; ICICI Direct; ICICI Home Finance Company; I-Process
- Capital ratio: Tier 1 16.35% (2026)
- Rating: S&P BBB-/Stable; Moody's Baa3/Stable; Fitch BB+/Stable
- Website: icici.bank.in

ICICI Bank is an Indian multinational private bank and financial services company headquartered in Mumbai.It was established in 1955 at the initiative of the World Bank, the Government of India and representatives of Indian industry. It offers services to corporate and retail customers, and has subsidiaries for investment banking, life and non-life insurance, venture capital, and asset management.

The bank has a network of 7,656 branches and 12,143 ATMs across India. It also has a presence in 19 countries, including subsidiaries in the United Kingdom and Canada. The Reserve Bank of India (RBI) has identified the State Bank of India, HDFC Bank, and ICICI Bank as domestic systemically important banks (D-SIBs), which are often referred to as banks that are "too big to fail".

== History ==
The Industrial Credit and Investment Corporation of India (ICICI) was a government institution established on 5 January 1955 and Sir Arcot Ramasamy Mudaliar was elected as the first Chairman of ICICI Ltd. It was structured as a joint-venture of the World Bank, India's public-sector banks and public-sector insurance companies to provide project financing to Indian industry. ICICI Bank was established by ICICI as a wholly owned subsidiary in 1994 in Vadodara.

And in October 2001, the Boards of Directors of ICICI and ICICI Bank approved the merger of ICICI and two of its wholly-owned retail finance subsidiaries, ICICI Personal Financial Services Limited and ICICI Capital Services Limited, with ICICI Bank. The merger of parent ICICI Ltd. into its subsidiary ICICI Bank led to privatization.

In the 1990s, ICICI transformed its business from a development financial institution offering only project finance to a diversified financial services group, offering a wide variety of products and services, both directly and through a number of subsidiaries and affiliates like ICICI Bank. ICICI Bank launched Internet Banking operations in 1998.

ICICI's shareholding in ICICI Bank was reduced to 46% through a public offering of shares in India in 1998, followed by an equity offering in the form of American depositary receipts on the NYSE in 2000. ICICI Bank acquired the Bank of Madura Limited in an all-stock deal in 2001 and sold additional stakes to institutional investors during 2001–02. In 1999, ICICI become the first Indian company and the first bank or a financial institution from non-Japan Asia to be listed on the NYSE.

ICICI, ICICI Bank, and ICICI subsidiaries ICICI Personal Financial Services Limited and ICICI Capital Services Limited merged in a reverse merger in 2002. During the 2008 financial crisis, customers rushed to ICICI ATMs and branches in some locations due to rumours of bank failure. The Reserve Bank of India issued a clarification on the financial strength of ICICI Bank to dispel the rumours.

By March 2018, ICICI bank was the country's largest private sector bank with consolidated asset of Rs. 11,24,281 crore.

In March 2020, the board of ICICI Bank Ltd. approved an investment of ₹10 billion (US$100 million) in Yes Bank, resulting in a 5% ownership interest in Yes Bank.

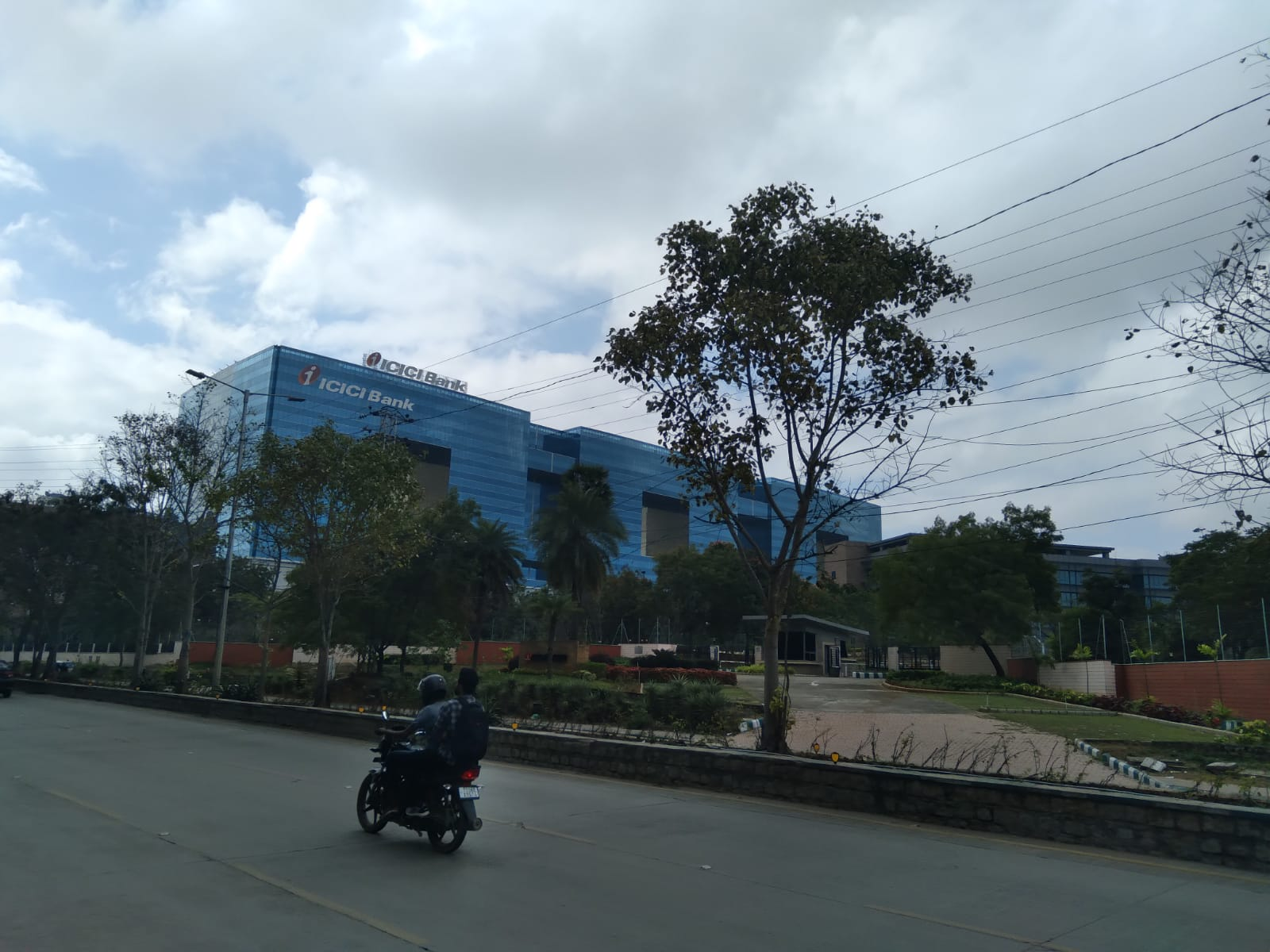
ICICI Bank office in Financial District, Hyderabad.

== Acquisitions ==
- 1996: ICICI Ltd. A financial institution with headquarters in Mumbai
- 1997: ITC Classic Finance. Incorporated in 1986, ITC Classic was a non-bank financial firm that engaged in hire, purchase and leasing operations. At the time of being acquired, ITC Classic had eight offices, 26 outlets and 700 brokers.
- 1997: SCICI (Shipping Credit and Investment Corporation of India)
- 1998: Anagram (ENAGRAM) Finance. Anagram had a network of some 50 branches in Gujarat, Rajasthan, and Maharashtra that were primarily engaged in the retail financing of cars and trucks. It also had some 250,000 depositors.
- 2001: Bank of Madura
- 2002: The Darjeeling and Shimla branches of Grindlays Bank
- 2005: Investitsionno-Kreditny Bank (IKB), a Russian bank
- 2007: Sangli Bank. Sangli Bank was a private sector unlisted bank, founded in 1916, and 30% owned by the Bhate family. Its headquarters were in Sangli in Maharashtra, and it had 198 branches. It had 158 in Maharashtra and 31 in Karnataka, and others in Gujarat, Andhra Pradesh, Tamil Nadu, Goa, and Delhi. Its branches were relatively evenly split between metropolitan areas and rural or semi-urban areas.
- 2010: The Bank of Rajasthan (BOR) was acquired by the ICICI Bank in 2010 for ₹30 billion (US$310 million). Reserve Bank of India was critical of BOR's promoters not reducing their holdings in the company. BOR has since been merged with ICICI Bank.

== Role in Indian financial infrastructure ==
ICICI Bank has contributed to the setting up of a number of Indian institutions to establish financial infrastructure in the country over the years:

- In 1992, India's leading financial institutions, including ICICI Ltd., promoted the National Stock Exchange of India on behalf of the Government of India to establish a nationwide trading facility for equities, debt instruments, and hybrids, ensuring equal access to investors across the country through an appropriate communication network.
- In 1987, ICICI Ltd along with UTI set up CRISIL as India's first professional credit rating agency.
- NCDEX (National Commodities and Derivatives EXchange) was set up in 2003, by ICICI Bank Ltd, LIC, NABARD, NSE, Canara Bank, CRISIL, Goldman Sachs, Indian Farmers Fertiliser Cooperative Limited (IFFCO) and Punjab National Bank.
- ICICI Bank facilitated the setting up of "FINO Cross Link to Case Link Study" in 2006, as a company that would provide technology solutions and services to reach the underserved and underbanked population of the country. Using technologies like smart cards, biometrics and a basket of support services, FINO enables financial institutions to conceptualise, develop and operationalise projects to support sector initiatives in microfinance and livelihoods.
- Entrepreneurship Development Institute of India (EDII), was set up in 1983, by the erstwhile apex financial institutions like IDBI, ICICI, IFCI and SBI with the support of the Government of Gujarat as a national resource organisation committed to entrepreneurship development, education, training and research.
- North Eastern Development Finance Corporation Ltd. (NEDFi) was promoted by national-level financial institutions like ICICI Ltd in 1995 at Guwahati, Assam for the development of industries, infrastructure, animal husbandry, agri-horticulture plantation, medicinal plants, sericulture, aquaculture, poultry and dairy in the North Eastern states of India.
- Following the enactment of the Securitisation Act in 2002, ICICI Bank, together with other institutions, set up Asset Reconstruction Company India Limited (ARCIL) in 2003. ARCIL was established to acquire non-performing assets (NPAs) from financial institutions and banks with a view to enhance the management of these assets and help in the maximisation of recovery.
- ICICI Bank helped establish India's first national credit bureau, Credit Information Bureau of India Limited (CIBIL), in 2000. CIBIL provides credit information reports to its members, containing the credit history of both commercial and consumer borrowers.

== Subsidiaries ==
=== ICICI Prudential Life Insurance ===
ICICI Prudential Life Insurance is a joint-venture between ICICI bank and Prudential Corporation Holdings Limited, and are involved in insurance and asset management business. It is one of the first private sector life insurance companies and commenced operations in 2001.

=== ICICI Lombard ===
ICICI Lombard is a private sector non-life insurance company in India.

=== ICICI Prudential Mutual Fund ===
ICICI Prudential Mutual Fund is a private-sector fund house, with funds in equities, debt, hybrid and other categories.

=== ICICI Securities ===
ICICI Securities Limited was established in March 1995 as a wholly-owned subsidiary of ICICI Bank. The company provides services in equity and derivatives trading, as well as research related to stock and commodity markets. Its retail broking platform is called ICICI Direct.

=== ICICI Bank Canada ===
ICICI Bank Canada
- Type: Subsidiary
- Industry: Financial services
- Founded: 2003
- Headquarters: 220 Yonge Street, Toronto, Ontario, Canada
- Key people: Vikash Sharma (President and Chief Executive Officer)
- Parent: ICICI Bank Limited
- Website: www.icicibank.ca

ICICI Bank Canada is a wholly owned subsidiary of ICICI Bank, whose corporate office is located in Toronto. Established in December 2003, ICICI Bank Canada is a full-service direct bank with assets of about $6.5 billion as of 31 December 2019. It is governed by Canada's Bank Act and operates under the supervision of the Office of the Superintendent of Financial Institutions. The bank has seven branches in Canada.

In November 2003, ICICI Bank Canada was established as a Schedule II (foreign-owned or -controlled) bank, and its head office and downtown Toronto branch was opened in December. In 2008, the bank relocated its corporate office to the Don Valley Business Park in Toronto.

ICICI Bank Canada is a member of the Canadian Bankers Association (CBA); a registered member with the Canada Deposit Insurance Corporation (CDIC), a federal agency insuring deposits at all of Canada's chartered banks; Interac Association; Cirrus Network; and The Exchange Network.

=== ICICI Bank UK ===
ICICI Bank UK plc

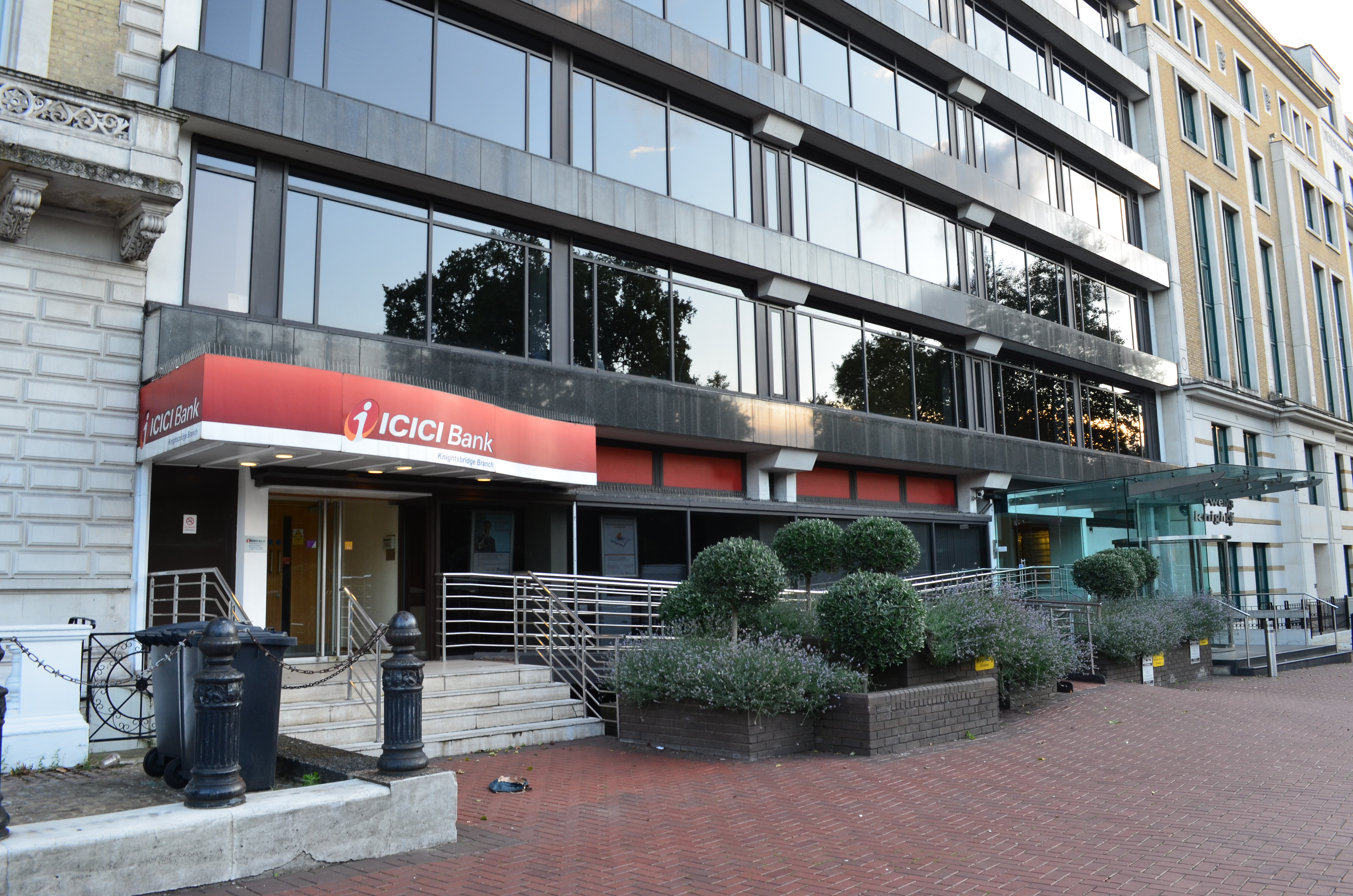
- An ICICI Bank branch in London, England
- Type: Subsidiary
- Industry: Financial services
- Founded: 2003
- Headquarters: One Thomas More Square, London E1W 1YN
- Parent: ICICI Bank Limited
- Website: www.icicibank.co.uk

ICICI Bank UK was incorporated in England and Wales on 11 February 2003, as a private company with the name ICICI Bank UK Ltd. It then became a public limited company on 30 October 2006. Presently the Bank has seven branches in the UK: one each in Birmingham, East Ham, Harrow, London, Manchester, Southall and Wembley.

The bank currently has seven branches in the UK. ICICI Bank UK PLC is authorised by the Prudential Regulation Authority and regulated by the Financial Conduct Authority and Prudential Regulation Authority. It is covered by the Financial Services Compensation Scheme (FSCS). The bank has a long-term foreign currency credit rating of Baa1 from Moody's. On 31 March 2019, it had a capital adequacy ratio of 16.8%.

=== Other regional subsidiaries ===
ICICI Bank also has branches in United States, Singapore, Bahrain, Hong Kong, Qatar, Oman, Dubai International Finance Centre, China and South Africa; as well as representative offices in United Arab Emirates, Bangladesh, Malaysia and Indonesia. The company's UK subsidiary has also established branches in Belgium and Germany.

== Activities ==
=== Inhumane debt recovery methods ===
A number of cases were filed against ICICI Bank and its employees for using "brutal measures" in its recovery methods against loan payment defaulters and credit card payments, with allegations that the bank was using goons to recover the money and that the recovery agents exhibited "inappropriate" and, in some cases, "inhuman" behaviour. Incidents were reported wherein the defaulters were put to "public shame" by the recovery agents. In some cases, notes written by the bank's employees asking the defaulters to "sell everything in the house, including family members" were found. Some suicide notes reportedly spoke of the bank's recovery methods as the cause of the suicide. Subsequently, the bank faced legal cases and monetary penalties.

=== Money laundering allegations ===
ICICI Bank was one of the leading Indian banks accused of facilitating money laundering in a sting operation conducted by the online magazine Cobrapost in 2013. On 14 March 2013, Cobrapost released video footage from Operation Red Spider showing high-ranking officials and some employees of ICICI Bank agreeing to convert black money into white, an act in violation of Prevention of Money Laundering Act, 2002. The Government of India and Reserve Bank of India (RBI) ordered an inquiry following the exposé. On 15 March 2013, ICICI Bank suspended 18 employees, pending inquiry. On 11 April 2013, the Deputy Governor of RBI, Harun Rashid Khan reportedly said that the central bank was initiating action against ICICI Bank in connection with allegations of money laundering.

=== Chanda Kochhar fraud case ===
On 4 October 2018, Chanda Kochhar stepped down as MD and CEO of ICICI Bank following allegations of corruption. In January 2019, based on the report of an enquiry panel headed by Justice Srikrishna, the bank board terminated her employment, and asked for a claw back of bonuses and benefits. In 2020, the Enforcement Directorate provisionally seized assets and shares belonging to Chanda Kochhar worth more than ₹78 crore (US$11.08 million), in relation to the ICICI bank loan case.

=== Data Breach of 2024 ===
In April 2024, the bank admitted to facing a data glitch that affected nearly 17,000 of the newly issued credit card users. These cards were mistakenly linked to wrong users in the digital channels of the bank. The bank assured that the glitch was rectified and that a financial compensation would be given to those affected.

Celebrity Engagement

Amitabh Bachchan, Shah Rukh Khan, Anil Kapoor, Samantha Ruth Prabhu, Seema Pahwa, and Priyamani are among the most prominent Bollywood and regional cinema celebrities who have starred in advertisements for ICICI Bank and its subsidiaries.

== See also ==
- Banking in India
- List of banks in India
- Reserve Bank of India
