= UTI Asset Management =

Indian mutual fund institution

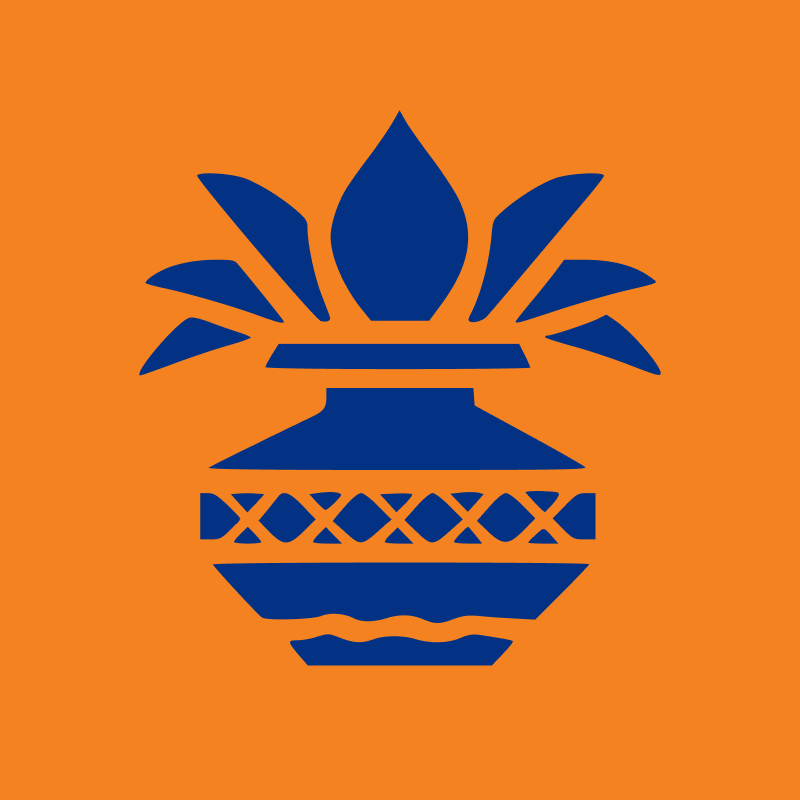
- Type: Public
- Traded as: BSE: 543238; NSE: UTIAMC
- Industry: Investment management
- Founded: 1963; 63 years ago
- Headquarters: Mumbai, Maharashtra, India
- Area served: India and 35 other countries
- Key people: Vetri Subramaniam (Managing Director & CEO)
- Products: Asset Management; Wealth Management
- AUM: ▲₹1,889,318 crore (US$200 billion) (July 2026)
- Owner: Life Insurance Corporation of India (18.5%); Bank of Baroda (18.5%); Punjab National Bank (18.5%); State Bank of India (18.5); T. Rowe Price (23%)
- Number of employees: 1,422 (2026)
- Website: www.utimf.com

UTI Asset Management Company (UTI AMC) is an Indian asset management company. It manages mutual funds, portfolio management services, and retirement solutions for individual and institutional investors. UTI Mutual Fund was launched by the Government of India in 1963, and it is one of the oldest mutual fund companies in India.

== History ==
The Unit Trust of India (UTI), first mutual fund in India, was set up by an Act of Parliament in 1963. Mutual funds in India are constituted in the form of trusts under the Indian Trusts Act of 1882. The Unit Trust of India aimed to encourage saving by providing for various classes of investors the facility of investing their money in units of the Trust. In 1964, UTI launched its first investment scheme Unit Scheme-1964 initially RBI had the regulatory and administrative control. UTI had the monopoly of the mutual fund industry till 1987 when the Government of India permitted public sector banks and financial institutions to sponsor mutual funds.

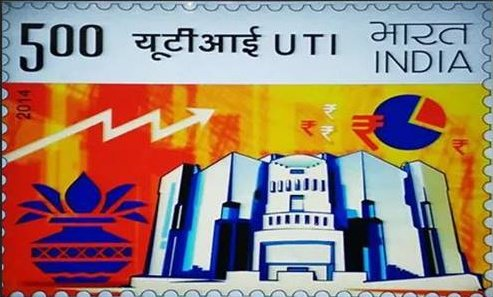
Golden Jubilee Year - Commemorative Stamp

Under Unit Scheme-1964, UTI had sold and repurchased the units at prices fixed arbitrarily by its management rather than on the basis of the actual value of the underlying assets, attributing to its abnormally high dividends. Investment decisions based on political compulsions taken by those in key positions exacerbated by the political instability in the 1990s and the consequent market rout and took a toll on the Unit Scheme-1964 which ultimately led to the government intervention in 2002 with a bailout package and the act to repeal and transfer the undertakings of the trust.

Erstwhile Unit Trust of India was bifurcated with the non-NAV based schemes brought under the government purview and other under the purview of SEBI. While the former came under the Administrator of the Specified Undertaking of The Unit Trust of India (SUTTI) and the latter became the asset manager, UTI Mutual Fund.

== Specified Undertaking of UTI ==
Restructuring of Unit Scheme-1964 brought the large equity holdings along with other assets including real estate and 25 assured-return schemes to the Specified Undertaking of The Unit Trust of India (SUTTI). As of 2016, SUTTI had stakes in 43 listed and 8 unlisted companies valued more than Rs. 60,000 Crores.

== UTI Mutual Fund ==
Considering the active schemes, UTI Mutual Fund is one of the oldest mutual fund companies in India. UTI Mutual Fund has been a pioneer in launching various schemes, such as the UTI Unit Linked Insurance Plan (ULIP) with life and accident cover (launched in 1971), UTI Master Share (launched in 1986), India's first Offshore Fund – India Fund (launched in 1986), and the UTI Wealth Builder Fund, the first of its kind in the Indian mutual fund industry combining different asset classes like equity and gold, which are lowly correlated.

The company manages the portfolios of domestic and offshore funds and offers discretionary, non-discretionary and advisory services to HNI clients, corporates, and institutions; and also offers retirement solutions and private equity funds in India and 35+ countries through the principal and subsidiary business entities.

It also manages pension funds in India and currently has an investor base of more than 12 million live folios. UTI Mutual Fund has a nationwide reach through its distribution channels. It currently operates more than 190 branches across the country.

As of 2026, UTI AMC has an Assets Under Management (AUM) of Rs.18.56 lakh crores.

== See also ==
- Mutual funds in India
- Government of India
