= List of institutes funded by the government of India =

List of educational institutions in India

National institutes or central institutes are institutes established by the Government of India and supported by national agencies such as CSIR, ESIC, ICAR, MoHFW, DBT DST, ICMR, DAE, MHRD, MHA etc. including the Institutes of National Importance.

== List of Institutions ==
Listed below are some of the centrally-funded institutes along with their location. Number of Institutes increased in each category of CFTI, NIT, IIIT and IIT institutes.

Institute	Location
All India Institute of Medical Sciences (AIIMS) (Medical)	New Delhi, Nagpur, Bhopal, Bhubaneswar, Jodhpur, Patna, Raipur, Rishikesh, Bilaspur, Guwahati, Rajkot, Jammu, Deoghar, Kalyani, Bibinagar, Mangalagiri, Gorakhpur, Raebareli, Batinda
All India Institute of Speech and Hearing (AIISH) (Allied Healthcare)	Mysuru
Aryabhatta Research Institute of Observational Sciences (ARIES) (Natural Resource)	Nainital
Birbal Sahni Institute of Palaeobotany (Civil Service)	Lucknow
Bose Institute	Kolkata
Central Drug Research Institute (Allied Healthcare)	Lucknow
Centre of Advanced Study in Botany (Natural Resource)	Varanasi
Centre for the Study of Developing Societies (CSDS) (Civil Service)	Delhi
Centre for Development of Advanced Computing (CDAC) (Computer Application, Electronics)	Bengaluru, Chennai, Delhi, Hyderabad, Kolkata, Mohali, Mumbai, Noida, Patna, Pune, Silchar, Thiruvananthapura
Central Electronics Engineering Research Institute (Engineering)	Pilani
Central Food Technological Research Institute (Allied Healthcare)	Mysuru
Central Glass and Ceramic Research Institute (Applied Science)	Kolkata
Central Mechanical Engineering Research Institute (Engineering Research)	Durgapur
Central Institute for Cotton Research (Natural Resource)	Nagpur
Central Institute of Agricultural Engineering (Natural Resource Engineering)	Bhopal
Central Institute of Brackish Water Aquaculture (Natural Resource)	Chennai
Central Institute of Educational Technology (Academics)	New Delhi
Central Institute of Fisheries Education (Natural Resource)	Mumbai
Central Institute of Fisheries, Nautical and Engineering Training (CIFNET) (Natural Resource/Civil Service/Engineering)	Cochin
Central Institute of Fresh Water Aquaculture (Natural Resource)	Bhubaneswar
Central Institute of Indian Languages (Academics)	Mysuru
Central Institute of Plastics Engineering and Technology (Applied Science)	Chennai
Central Institute of Psychiatry (Medical)	Ranchi
Central Institute of Medicinal and Aromatic Plants (Natural Resource)	Lucknow
Central Institute of Road Transport (CIRT) (Civil Service/Engineering)	Pune
Central Leather Research Institute (Natural Resource)	Chennai
Central Institute of Technology, Kokrajhar (CIT) (Engineering)	Kokrajhar
Central Mine Planning and Design Institute Limited (Natural Resource)	Ranchi
Central Research Institute for Dryland Agriculture (Natural Resource)	Hyderabad
Central Sheep and Wool Research Institute (Natural Resource)	Avikanagar
Central Soil Salinity Research Institute (Natural Resource)	New Delhi
Centre for Cultural Resources and Training (Civil Service)	New Delhi
Centre for Development Studies (Civil Service)	Thiruvananthapuram
Centre for Excellence in Basic Sciences (Civil Service)	Mumbai
College of Defence Management (Defence Service)	Secunderabad
Deccan College Post-Graduate and Research Institute (Social Science)	Pune
ESIC Medical College and PGIMSR, Gulbarga (Medical)	Kalaburagi
Film and Television Institute of India (Entertainment)	Pune
Forest College and Research Institute (FCRI), Hyderabad	Hyderabad
FDDI (Institute of National Importance)	Hyderabad Telangana
Ghani Khan Chowdhury Institute of Engineering & Technology (Engineering)	Malda
Gandhigram Rural University (Academics)	Dindigul
Harish Chandra Research Institute (HRI)	Allahabad
Indian Agricultural Research Institute (IARI) (Natural Resource)	New Delhi
Indian Association for the Cultivation of Science (IACS) (Natural Resource)	Kolkata
Indian Diamond Institute (Natural Resource)	Surat
Indian Institute of Architects (Architecture)	Mumbai
Indian Institute of Astrophysics (Natural Resource)	Bengaluru
Indian Institute of Chemical Biology (IICB) (Allied Healthcare)	Kolkata
Indian Institute of Chemical Technology (Civil Service)	Hyderabad
Indian Institute of Coal Management (Civil Service/Engineering)	Ranchi
Indian Institute of Engineering Science and Technology (IIEST) (Engineering)	Shibpur
Indian Institute of Foreign Trade (IIFT) (Civil Service/Business Administration)	New Delhi, Kolkata
Indian Institute of Forest Management (IIFM) (Natural Resource)	Bhopal
Indian Institute of Information Technology (IIIT) (Engineering)	Gwalior, Prayagraj, Dharwad, Agartala, Jabalpur, Kanchipuram, Kottayam, Kurnool, Guwahati, Nagpur, Bhopal, Pune, Raichur, Sri City, Surat, Vadodara, Ranchi, Kalyani, Lucknow, Una, Sonepat, Kota, Manipur, Bhagalpur, Tiruchirappalli
Indian Institute of Management (Business Administration)	Amritsar, Ahmedabad, Bengaluru, Kolkata, Lucknow, Kozhikode, Indore, Shillong, Kashipur, Raipur, Ranchi, Rohtak, Trichy, Udaipur, Visakhapatnam, Sambalpur, Nagpur
Indian Institute of Information Technology and Management (Engineering)	Gwalior
Indian Institute of Mass Communication (IIMC) (Civil Service)	Aizawl, Amravati, Dhenkanal, Jammu, Kottayam, New Delhi
Indian Institute of Petroleum (Natural Resource/Engineering)	Dehradun
Indian Institute of Petroleum and Energy (Natural Resource/Engineering)	Visakhapatnam
Indian Institute of Plantation Management (Natural Resource)	Bengaluru
Indian Institute of Pulses Research (Natural Resource)	Kanpur
Indian Institute of Remote Sensing (IIRS) (Civil Service)	Dehradun
Indian Institute of Science (IISc) (Academics)	Bengaluru
Indian Institute of Science Education and Research (IISER) (Academics)	Kolkata, Pune, Mohali, Bhopal, Thiruvananthapuram, Tirupati, Berhampur
Indian Institute of Social Welfare and Business Management (Civil Service)	Kolkata
Indian Institute of Soil Science (Natural Resource)	Bhopal
Indian Institute of Space Science and Technology (IIST) (Engineering)	Thiruvananthapuram
Indian Institute of Spices Research (Natural Resource)	Calicut
Indian Institute of Technology (IIT) (Engineering)	Kharagpur, Kanpur, Mumbai, Chennai, Delhi, (ISM), Dhanbad, Dharwad, Guwahati, Bhubaneswar, Roorkee, Ropar, Hyderabad, Gandhinagar, Jodhpur, Patna, Mandi, Indore, Tirupati, (BHU), Varanasi, Tirupati, Palakkad, Goa, Bhilai, Jammu
Indian Institute of Tourism and Travel Management(Tourism)	Gwalior, Nellore, Bhubaneswar, Noida, Goa, Bodh Gaya (Camp), Shillong (Camp)
Indian Institute of Tropical Meteorology (Natural Resource)	Pune
Indian Institute of Natural Resins and Gums (Indian Lac Research Institute) (Natural Resource)	Ranchi
Indian Institute of Vegetable Research (Natural Resource)	Varanasi
Indian National Centre for Ocean Information Services (Natural Resource)	Hyderabad
Indian Maritime University (Civil Service/Engineering)	Chennai, Mumbai, Kolkata, Kochi, Visakhapatnam
Indian Statistical Institute (Civil Service)	Kolkata, Bengaluru, Chennai, Delhi
Indian Veterinary Research Institute (Natural Resource)	Bareilly
Indira Gandhi Institute of Development Research (Civil Service)	Mumbai
Indira Gandhi Centre for Atomic Research (IGCAR) (Natural Resource)	Kalpakkam
Indira Gandhi National Forest Academy (IGNFA) (Natural Resource)	Dehradun
Institute for Plasma Research (IPR) (Allied Healthcare)	Gandhinagar
Institute for Studies in Industrial Development (Civil Service)	New Delhi
Institute of Defence Studies and Analyses (Defence Service)	New Delhi
Institute of Economic Growth (Civil Service)	New Delhi
Institute of Food Security (Civil Service)	Gurugram
Institute of Genomics and Integrative Biology (IGIB) (Allied Healthcare)	New Delhi
Institute of Hotel Management (IHM) (Hospitality)	Delhi, Mumbai, Kolkata, Chennai, Bhubaneshwar, Goa, Jaipur, Shillong, Shimla, Guwahati, Gurdaspur, Bhopal, Srinagar, Chandigarh, Bengaluru, Gandhinagar, Gwalior, Hyderabad, Hajipur, Lucknow, Shimla, Kovalam.
Institute of Mathematical Sciences (IMSc) (Academics)	Chennai
Institute of Physics (Academics)	Bhubaneswar
Institute of Rural Management (Civil Service)	Anand
Institute of Secretariat Training and Management (Civil Service)	New Delhi
Institute for Studies in Industrial Development (Civil Service)	New Delhi
International Institute for Population Sciences (Civil Service)	Mumbai
Jawaharlal Institute of Postgraduate Medical Education & Research (Medical)	Puducherry
Jawaharlal Nehru Centre for Advanced Scientific Research (JNCASR) (Civil Service)	Bengaluru
Jawaharlal Nehru Aluminium Research Development and Design Centre (Civil Service)	Nagpur
King Institute of Preventive Medicine and Research (Medical)	Chennai
Lady Hardinge Medical College (Medical)	New Delhi
Lakshmibai National Institute of Physical Education (LNIPE) (Physical Education)	Gwalior
Malaviya Centre for Peace Research(Defence Service)	Varanasi
Marine Engineering and Research Institute (Engineering)	Kolkata
Maulana Abul Kalam Azad Institute of Asian Studies (Civil Service)	Kolkata
Morarji Desai National Institute of Yoga (Allied Healthcare)	New Delhi
National Academy of Agricultural Research Management (Natural Resource)	Rajendranagar
National Academy of Agricultural Sciences (Natural Resource)	New Delhi
National Academy of Construction (Architecture)	Hyderabad
National Academy of Customs Excise and Narcotics (NACEN) (Civil Service)	Kolkata, Hindupur
National Academy of Defence Production (Civil Service)	Nagpur
National Botanical Research Institute (NBRI) (Natural Resource)	Lucknow
National Brain Research Centre (NBRC) (Medical)	Manesar
National Centre for Polar and Ocean Research (Natural Resource)	Goa
National Civil Defence College (Defence Service/Civil Service)	Nagpur
National Dairy Research Institute (Natural Resource)	Karnal (Haryana)
National Defence College of India (Defence Service)	Delhi
National Environmental Engineering Research Institute (Natural Resource)	Nagpur
National Forensic Sciences University (NFSU) (Forensic Science)	Gandhinagar, Delhi, Ponda, Agartala
National Institute of Advanced Manufacturing Technology(NIAMT) (Previously NIFFT) (Applied Science)	Ranchi
National Institute for Micro, Small and Medium Enterprises (Civil Service)	Hyderabad
National Institute of Agricultural Extension Management (Natural Resource)	Hyderabad
National Institute of Agricultural Marketing (Civil Service/Natural Resource)	Jaipur
National Institute of Animal Welfare (Natural Resource/Civil Service)
National Institute of Construction Management and Research (Architecture)	Mumbai
National Institute of Design(Design)	Ahmedabad, Bangalore, Hyderabad, Kurukshetra, Jorhat, Bhopal, Vijayawada
National Institute of Disaster Management (Civil Service)	New Delhi
National Institute of Electronics & Information Technology (NIELIT) (Computer Application)	Ajmer, Agartala, Aizawl, Aurangabad, Calicut, Chennai, Chandigarh, Delhi, Gorakhpur, Gangtok, Guwahati, Imphal, Itanagar, Jammu, Kohima. Kolkata. Leh, Lucknow, Patna, Ranchi, Shillong, Srinagar, Tezpur
National Institute of Fashion Technology (Fashion)	Bangalore, Bhopal, Bhubaneswar, Chennai, Gandhinagar, Hyderabad, Jodhpur, Kangra, Kannur, Kolkata, Mumbai, Patna, Raebareli, Shillong
National Institute of Homoeopathy (Medical)	Kolkata
National Institute of Hydrology (Natural Resource)	Belgavi, Roorkee
National Institute of Industrial Engineering (Applied Science) (NITIE)	Mumbai
National Institute of Interdisciplinary Science and Technology (NIIST) (Engineering)	Thiruvananthapuram
National Institute of Malaria Research (Medical)	Delhi, Haridwar, Guwahati, Nadiad, Raipur, Ranchi, Rourkela, Goa, Bengaluru, Chennai
National Institute of Mental Health and Neurosciences (NIMHANS) (Medical)	Bengaluru
National Institute of Miners Health (NIMH) (Medical)	Nagpur
National Institute of Nutrition (Allied Healthcare)	Hyderabad
National Institute of Open Schooling	Noida
National Institute of Oceanography (NIO) (Natural Resource)	Goa, Kochi, Mumbai, Visakhapatnam
National Institute of Ocean Technology (Natural Resource)	Chennai, Nellore
National Institute of Public Finance and Policy (Civil Service)	New Delhi
National Institute of Pharmaceutical Education and Research (Allied Healthcare)	Mohali, Ahmedabad, Raebareli, Hyderabad, Guwahati, Hajipur, Kolkata
National Institute of Rural Development (Civil Service)	Hyderabad
National Institute of Science Communication and Information Resources (NISCAIR) (Civil Service)	New Delhi
National Institute of Science Communication and Information Resources (Civil Service)	Delhi
National Institute of Science Education and Research (NISER) (Academics)	Bhubaneswar
National Institute of Securities Markets (NISM) (Civil Service/Finance)	Navi Mumbai
National Seed Research and Training Centre (Natural Resource)	Varanasi
National Institute Of Technical Teachers Training and Research (Academics)	Bhopal, Chandigarh, Chennai and Kolkata
National Institute of Technology (Engineering)	Agartala, Aizawl, Prayagraj, Bhopal, Chümoukedima, Durgapur, Goa, Hamirpur, Imphal, Jaipur, Jalandhar, Jamshedpur, Karaikal, Calicut, Kurukshetra, Nagpur, New Delhi, Patna, Raipur, Sikkim, Rourkela, Shillong, Silchar, Srinagar, Surat, Surathkal, Trichy, Tadepalligudem, Warangal, Yupia
National Institute of Urban Affairs (Civil Service)	New Delhi
National Institute of Water Sports (Physical Education)	Goa
National Museum Institute of the History of Art, Conservation and Museology (NMIHACM) (Civil Service)	New Delhi
National Power Training Institute (Civil Service/Engineering)	Faridabad
National Sugar Institute (Civil Service)	Kanpur
National Tuberculosis Institute (Medical)	Bengaluru
National Institute of Homoeopathy (NIH) (Medical)	Kolkata
Netaji Subhas National Institute of Sports (NSNIS) (Physical Education)	Patiala
North Eastern Regional Institute of Science and Technology (NERIST) (Engineering)	Itanagar
Pandit Deendayal Upadhyaya Institute of Archaeology (PDUIA) (Archaeology)	Greater Noida
Physical Research Laboratory (PRL) (Academics)	Ahmedabad
Punjab Engineering College (PEC) (Engineering)	Chandigarh
Raman Research Institute (RRI)	Bengaluru
Rajiv Gandhi National Institute of Intellectual Property Management(Civil Service)	Nagpur
Rajiv Gandhi Institute of Petroleum Technology (Civil Service/Engineering/Natural Resource)	Rae Bareli
Rashtriya Raksha University (Civil Service/Engineering)	Gandhinagar
Saha Institute of Nuclear Physics (Civil Service)	Kolkata
Sanjay Gandhi Postgraduate Institute of Medical Sciences (Medical)	Lucknow
Sant Longowal Institute of Engineering and Technology (SLIET) (Engineering)	Sangrur
Satyajit Ray Film and Television Institute (Entertainment)	Kolkata
S.N. Bose National Centre for Basic Sciences (SNBNCBS)(Academics)	Kolkata
School of Planning and Architecture (Architecture)	Vijayawada, Bhopal, Delhi
Sushma Swaraj Institute of Foreign Service (Civil Service)	New Delhi
Tata Institute of Fundamental Research (TIFR) (Civil Service)	Mumbai, Hyderabad
Tata Institute of Social Sciences (Academics)	Mumbai, Hyderabad, Guwahati, Tuljapur
V. V. Giri National Labour Institute(Civil Service)	New Delhi
Variable Energy Cyclotron Center (Natural Resource)	Kolkata

== See also ==
- Ministry of Education (India)
- Department of Higher Education (India)
- Ministry of Science and Technology (India)
- List of autonomous higher education institutes in India
- List of institutions of higher education in India
- List of Institutes of National Importance
- List of central universities in India
- List of deemed universities in India
- List of private universities in India
- List of state universities in India
