= Moonis Raza =

Indian geographer

16th Vice Chancellor of the University of Delhi
- In office 1985 - 1990

6th Chairman of ICSSR
- In office Jan 1991 – July 1994

Personal details
- Born: 2 February 1925 Ghazipur district, Uttar Pradesh
- Died: 19 July 1994 (aged 69) Boston, United States
- Relations: Rahi Masoom Raza (brother)
- Education: Aligarh Muslim University

Moonis Raza (2 February 1925 – 18 July 1994) was an Indian academic administrator, regional planner and geographer of international repute. He was born in Ghazipur, Uttar Pradesh, India and educated at Aligarh University, India. He was the older brother of Prof Mehdi Raza, head and professor of geography and Rahi Masoom Raza, a poet, novelist, Indian Film Industry lyricist and screenplay and dialogue writer. He was married to Dr. Prof Shehla M Raza and had 5 children.

Raza's tenure as President/Vice Chancellor of Delhi University is regarded as one of the least controversial and academically productive in the institution's history. Raza was one of the co-founders (along with G Parthasarathy) of the internationally renowned Jawaharlal Nehru University (JNU) in New Delhi. He was the founding head of Center for Regional Development (CRD) and the first rector of the university. Raza oversaw the landscaping of the new campus and named all hostels/campuses at JNU. Raza is also believed to have strengthened the liberal ethos of Jawaharlal Nehru University. He is fondly remembered by his students for "Raza's Law of Ignorance", according to which "the ratio of the known and the known-to-be-unknown always remains constant". JNU's CRD holds an annual memorial lecture in his honor.

Raza was a visiting professor at Cornell University, United States (1976–1977) and held a large number of positions at departments and commissions operated by the Government of India. He received an honorary Doctor of Humane Letters degree from Tufts University, U.S. in 1991. He was a creator of and an original signatory to the Talloires Declaration, a ten-point action plan devised by the Association of University Leaders for a sustainable future.

Raza died of cardiac arrest in Boston, U.S. on 18 July 1994.

== Positions held ==
- Chairman, Indian Council of Social Science Research
- Founder Chairman, Institute for Studies in Industrial Development
- President, National Association of Geographers of India
- Honorary Director, Center of South Asian Studies
- Vice Chancellor of Delhi University
- Founder Chairman and Rector, Jawaharlal Nehru University
- Director, National Institute of Educational Planning and Administration (NIEPA)
- President, Indian Council of Educational Planners and Administrators
- President, International Association for Ladakh Studies
- Member, Executive Board of the Commonwealth Council of Educational Administration
- Member, Advisory Committee of the UNCRD Nagoya
- Member, Executive Board of the Commonwealth Council for Educational Administration
- Member, National Commission on Teachers
- National Lecturer in Geography
- Professor and Founding Chairman, Center for the Study of Regional Development (SSS), Jawaharlal Nehru University
- Visiting professor, Cornell University, United States
- Founder, General Education Center, Aligarh University (https://www.indiamart.com/proddetail/cultural-education-service-14883712691.html).

== Publications ==
Raza authored, co-authored, and edited numerous books and articles, including Atlas of Tribal India, Atlas of the Child in India,Valley of Kashmir, and Education and the Future: A Vision. https://fable.co/author/moonis-raza

https://jnu.ac.in/sites/default/files/current_events/M%20R%20Final%20Inviation%20%281%29.pdf
