= National Institute of Micro, Small and Medium Enterprises =

National Institute for Micro, Small and Medium Enterprises (NI-MSME)
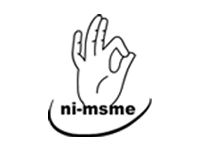
- Company type: The ni-msme (formerly as SIET, NI-SIET) is registered at Hyderabad in Telangana under Public Societies Registration Act I of 1350 Fasli with effect from 1 July 1962.
- Founded: 1962; 64 years ago
- Headquarters: NI-MSME Campus, Yousufguda, Hyderabad, India
- Areas served: Start-up, Scale-up, Entrepreneurship, Project Preparation, Leadership, Management, Planning and Promotion, Export-Import, GST, Intellectual Property Rights, Agribusiness, Clusters, Skill Enhancement, Capacity Building, Environmental and Waste Management with participants from more than 143 countries
- Key people: Dr. Ashutosh A. Murkute (Director General); Basudev Datta (Assistant Registrar)
- Parent: Ministry of Micro, Small and Medium Enterprises
- Website: www.nimsme.gov.in

National Institute for Micro, Small and Medium Enterprises (ni-msme) is a national institute in India aimed to foster the progress of micro, small and medium enterprises in India under Ministry of Micro, Small and Medium Enterprises. NI-MSME is registered in Hyderabad, Telangana, under Public Societies Registration Act I of 1350 Fasli with effect from 1 July 1962. The affairs of the Society are managed, administered, directed and controlled through Governing Council constituted by the Government of India as per Rule 22(a & b) of Rules and Regulations of the Society. The Society, as provided under Rule 3 of Rules and Regulations, was constituted by the Government of India. The Institute has been working in the areas of capacity building, research, skill upgradation, job enrichment training in the field of Entrepreneurship and Skill including the development of women pursuing small trades at the cottage industry level from an Incubation centre at NI-MSME.

== Director General ==
March 2025 to present: Dr. Ashutosh A. Murkute

== Publications ==
- Small Enterprises Development, Management & Extension
- Journal of Entrepreneurship, Innovation, Management and Skill Development (JIEMS)

== Activities ==
- NI-MSME has trained over 10,000 international participants in its nearly six decades since inception with more than 5.3 lakh local people have trained in over 15,800 programmes. In year 2019, three modules were conducted 73 participants from 28 nations got trained.
- The responsibility of setting up this Moonj bank — a storehouse for the wild Moonj grass used for making a range of household and decorative products – has been entrusted to the National Institute for Micro, Small and Medium Enterprises (NIMSME), Hyderabad, which will strive to find suitable markets for the Moonj products.
- On the occasion of International Women's day 13 women entrepreneurs and achievers were felicitated at the Shakti National Convention held at NIMSME Campus, Hyderabad.
- NIMSME took a green initiative by planting 1200 saplings on the campus was launched by the Director-General.

== See also ==
- List of institutes funded by the Central Government of India
- Indian Institutes of Technology
- Indian Institute of Engineering Science and Technology
- National Institutes of Technology
- Indian Ethos in Management
- Institute of National Importance
