= Talloires Declaration =

Declaration for sustainability

The Talloires Declaration is a declaration for sustainability, created for and by presidents of institutions of higher learning. Jean Mayer, Tufts University president, convened a conference of 22 universities in 1990 in Talloires, France. This document is a declaration that institutions of higher learning will be world leaders in developing, creating, supporting and maintaining sustainability. The registrar for the declaration is the Washington, DC–based organisation University Leaders for a Sustainable Future (ULSF). As of 1 February 2017, 502 college and university presidents have signed the declaration. These span 55 countries on five continents, with 170 in the United States alone.

== Original signatories ==
- Jean Mayer, President and Conference convener, Tufts University, United States
- Professor Julian Crampton, Vice-Chancellor, University of Brighton, United Kingdom
- Michele Gendreau-Massaloux, Rector, l'Academie de Paris, France
- Prof. Moonis Raza, Vice Chancellor, Delhi University, India
- Constance W. Curris, President, University of Northern Iowa, United States
- Wesley Posvar, President, University of Pittsburgh, United States
- Augusto Frederico Muller, President, Fundacao Universidade Federal de Mato Grosso, Brazil
- Calvin H. Pimpton, President and emeritus, American University of Beirut, Lebanon
- T. Navaneeth Rao, Vice Chancellor, Osmania University, India
- Stuart Saunders, Vice Chancellor and Principal, University of Cape Town, Union of South Africa
- David Ward, Vice Chancellor, University of Wisconsin - Madison, United States
- Pablo Arce, Vice Chancellor, Universidad Autonoma de Centro America, Costa Rica
- Boonrod Binson, Chancellor, Chulalongkorn University, Thailand
- Adamu, Nayaya Mohammed, Vice Chancellor, Ahmadu Bello University, Nigeria
- Mario Ojeda Gómez, President, Colegio de Mexico, Mexico
- Pavel D. Sarkisow, Rector, D. I. Mendeleev Institute of Chemical Technology, Russia
- Akilagpa Sawyerr, Vice Chancellor, University of Ghana, Ghana
- Carlos Vogt, President, Universidade Estadual de Campinas, Brazil
- Xide Xie, President Emeritus, Fudan University, People's Republic of China
- L. Avo Banjo, Vice Chancellor, University of Ibadan, Nigeria
- Robert W. Charlton, Vice Chancellor and Principal, University of Witwatersrand, Union of South Africa
