= National Institute of Water Sports =

Designated centre

National Institute of Watersports
- Type: Central Autonomous
- Chairman: Minister for Tourism, Govt. of India
- Location: Panaji, Goa, India; 15.45978°N 73.80207°E
- Nickname: NIWS
- Website: NIWS
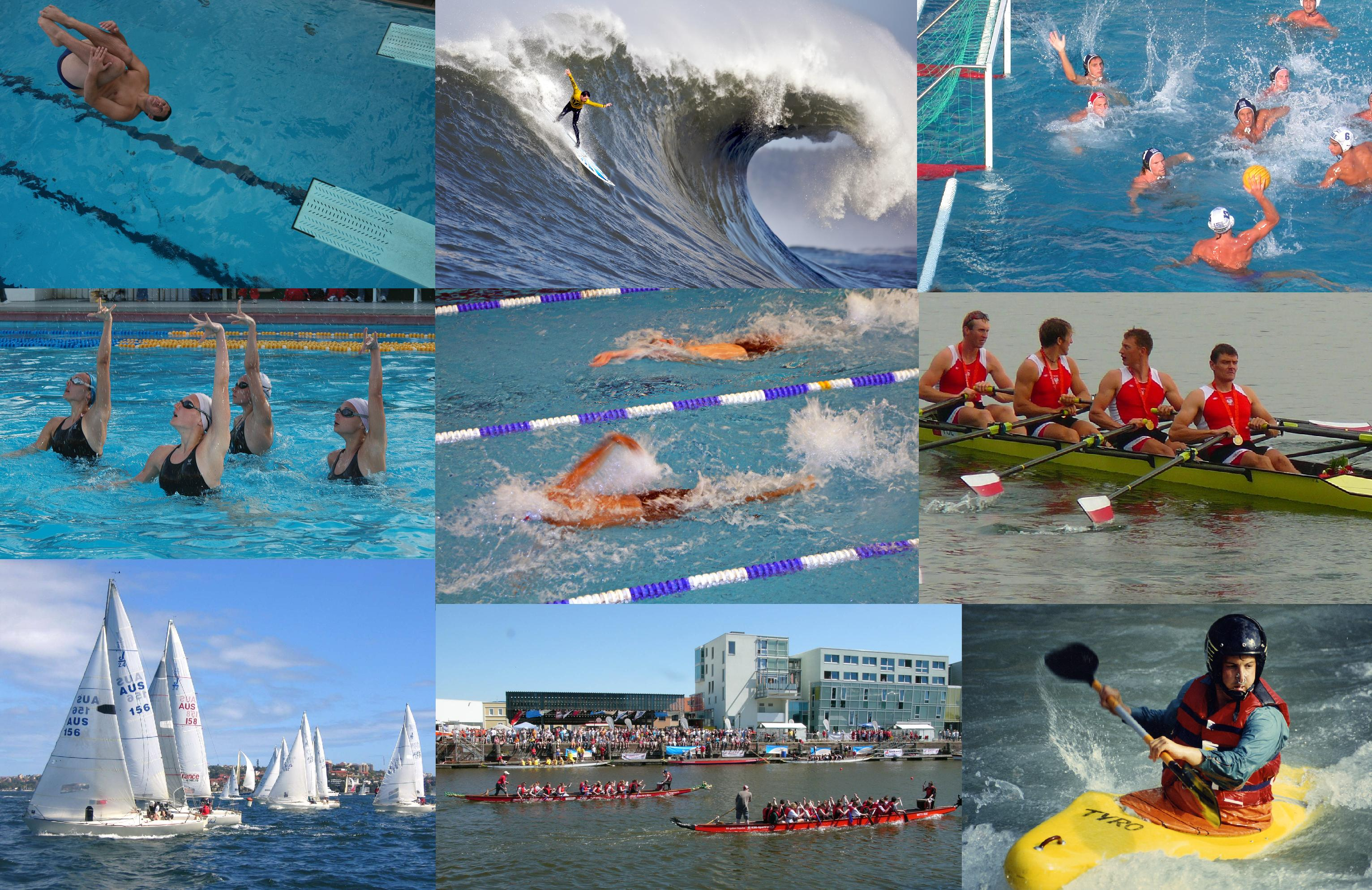
- A variety of water sports

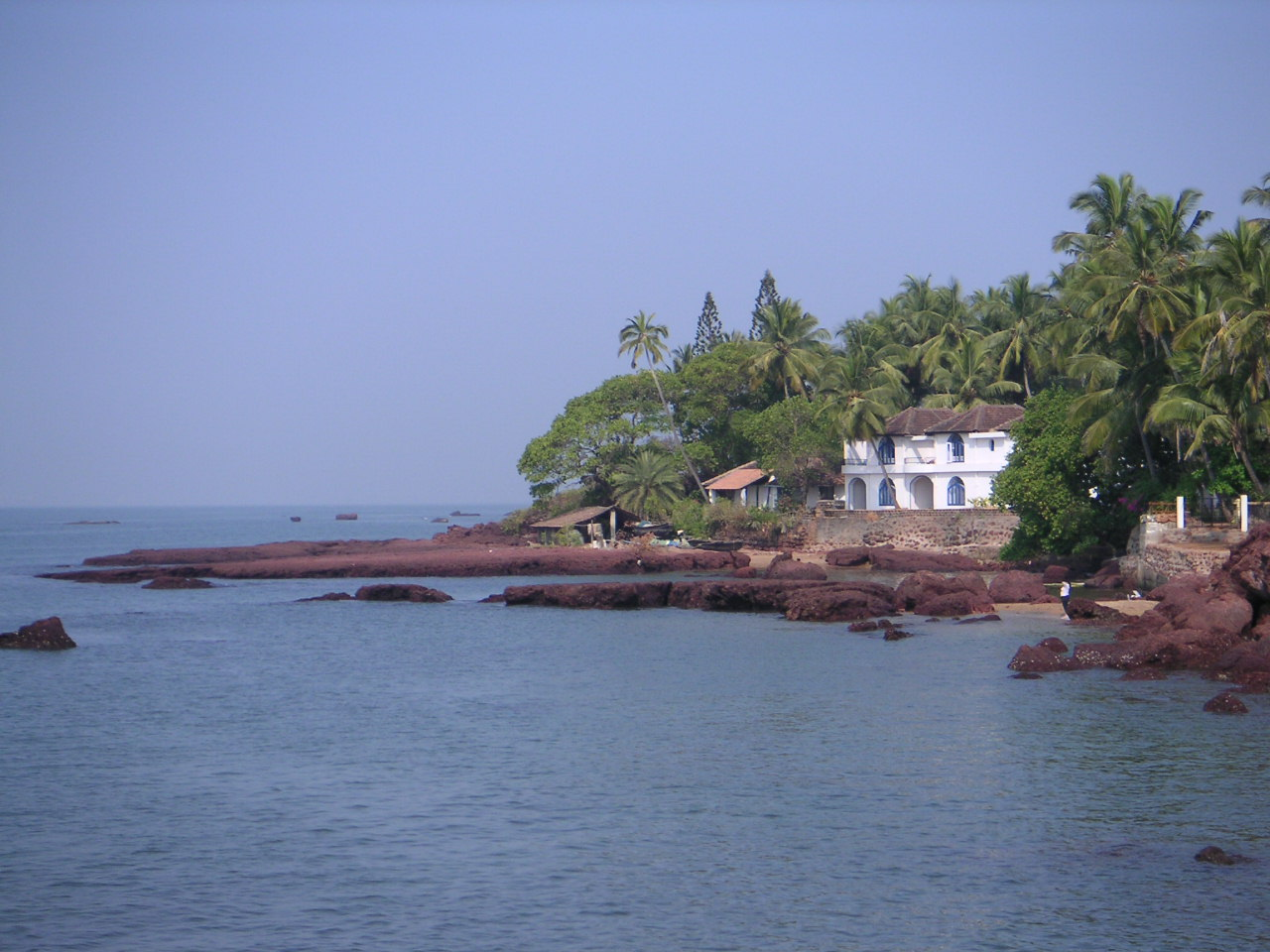
Goa coastline

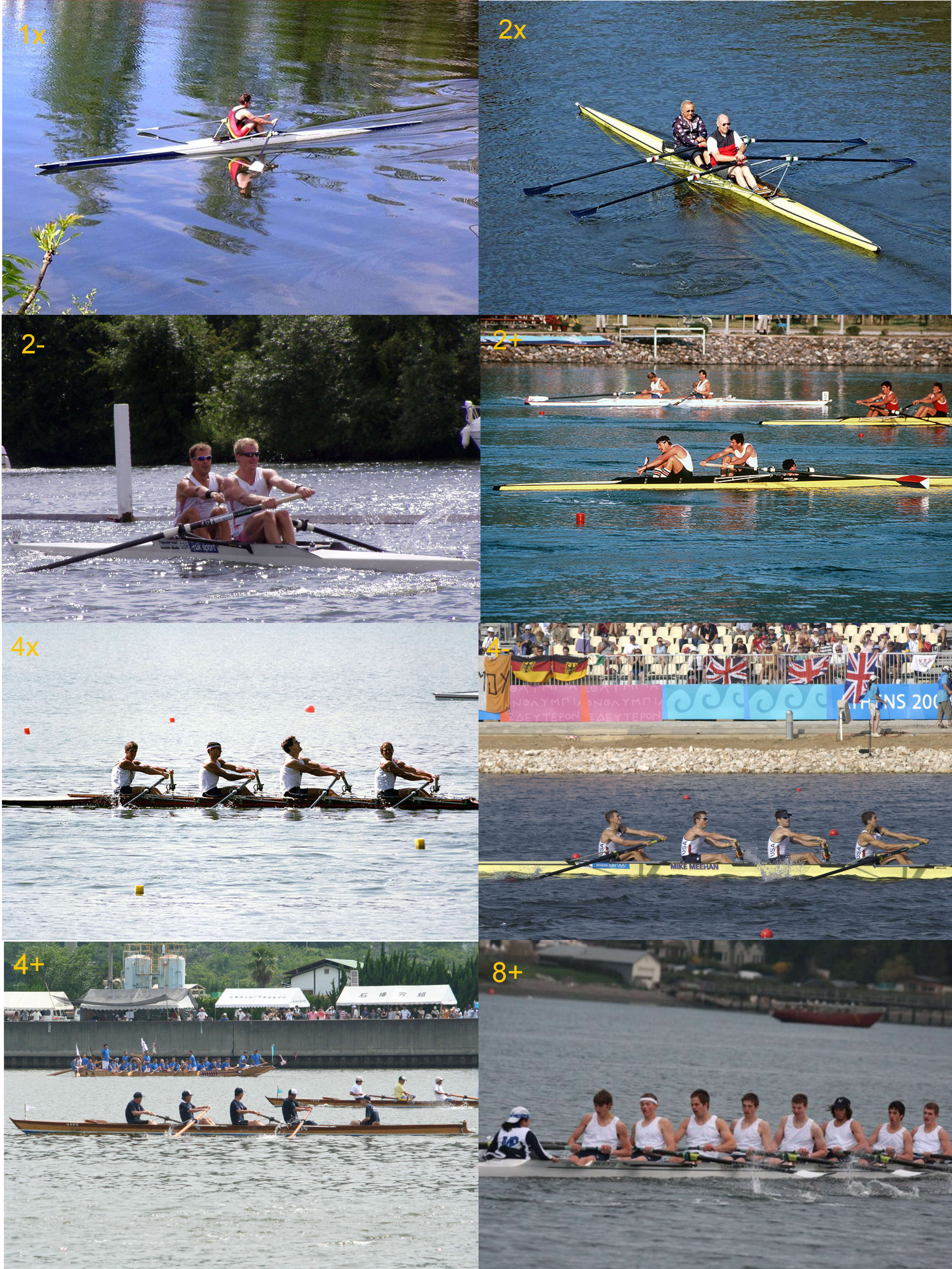
Rowing boats

The National Institute of Water Sports (NIWS) is designated centre under Indian Institute of Tourism and Travel Management (IITTM) which run by Tourism Ministry, India. The Institute, only one of its nature in South Asia, acts as the apex body for training, education, consultancy and research on areas related to recreational and leisure Watersports. The certification and licensing from this Institute are required for carrying out operations in water-bodies such as handling different watercraft for the tourists, swimming pools, water theme-parks etc. Some major disciplines for training and education are life saving, powerboat handling, sailing, windsurfing, water skiing, scuba diving, river rafting and kayaking. From Academic Year 2016, MBA- Tourism (Tourism & Travel) has been introduced & PhD in Tourism & Travel commenced in July 2018 at its state-of-the art campus.

== Profile ==
The National Institute of Water Sports was established in July 1990 under the aegis of the Ministry of Tourism, Govt. of India on a 16.5 acres of beach side site in Panaji. In 2004, it was designated as a A Centre under Indian Institute of Tourism and Travel Management (IITTM). It is the first institute of its kind in the South East Asia and only Institution under the Central or State Government for the matters related to Aqua-tourism and adventure. The Board of Governors of IITTM controls the activities of the institute.

The Institute is the apex body for water sports in India and the nodal agency for training, consultancy, development, regulation, framing safety norms, benchmarking and promotion of water sports. The Adventure Tourism Guidelines of Govt. of India designated NIWS as only agency for training, certification and licensing for handling recreational watercraft in India. The spectrum of activities ranges from advising state government agencies and corporate/ private entrepreneurs on safety norms, preparation of feasibility studies, organising water sports awareness and water safety campaigns, inspection and certification of water sports centres to training on water sports disciplines. A training program namely "Sea Rescue Squad" has been introduced recently. It is also actively engaged in competence building of defence agencies especially in the domain of aqua-based adventures.

== Facilities ==
The campus being built for the Institute at Caranzalem, Near Dona Paula Circle, Panaji, Goa has all training and education facilities including a large dive pool.[3] It features a faculty pool, and many other aspects. Efforts are also being made to expand the facility and cover a wide range of adventure sports including land-based adventures at Caranzalem, Panjim in Goa.

== Gallery ==
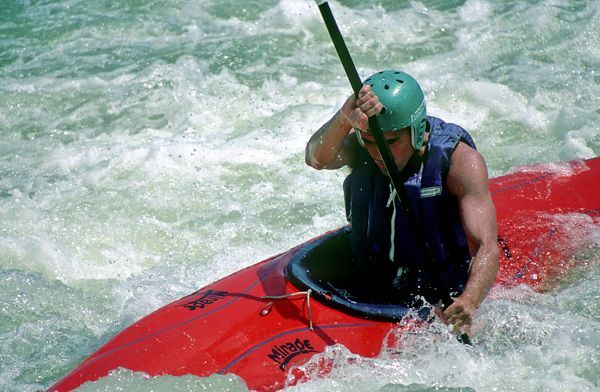
Sport kayaker

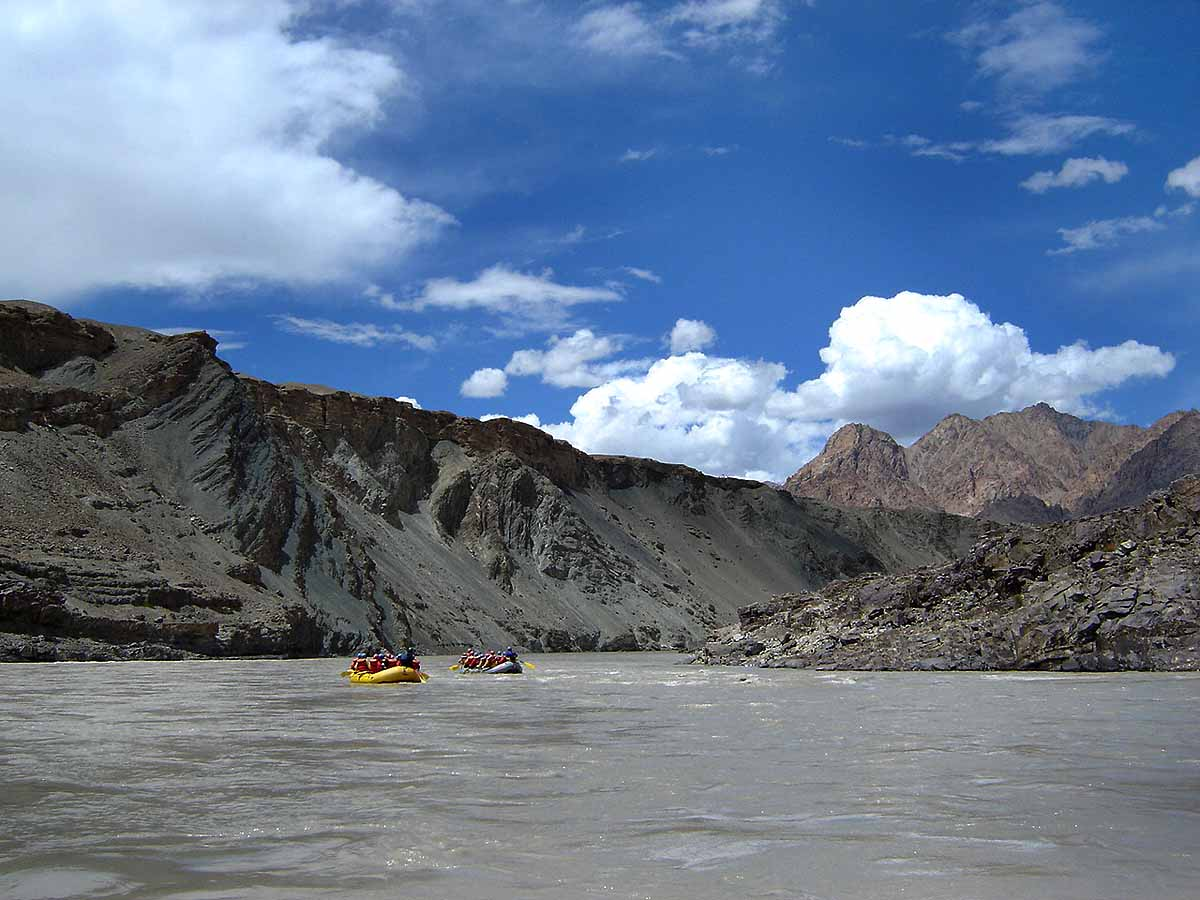
Rafting in Ladakh, India

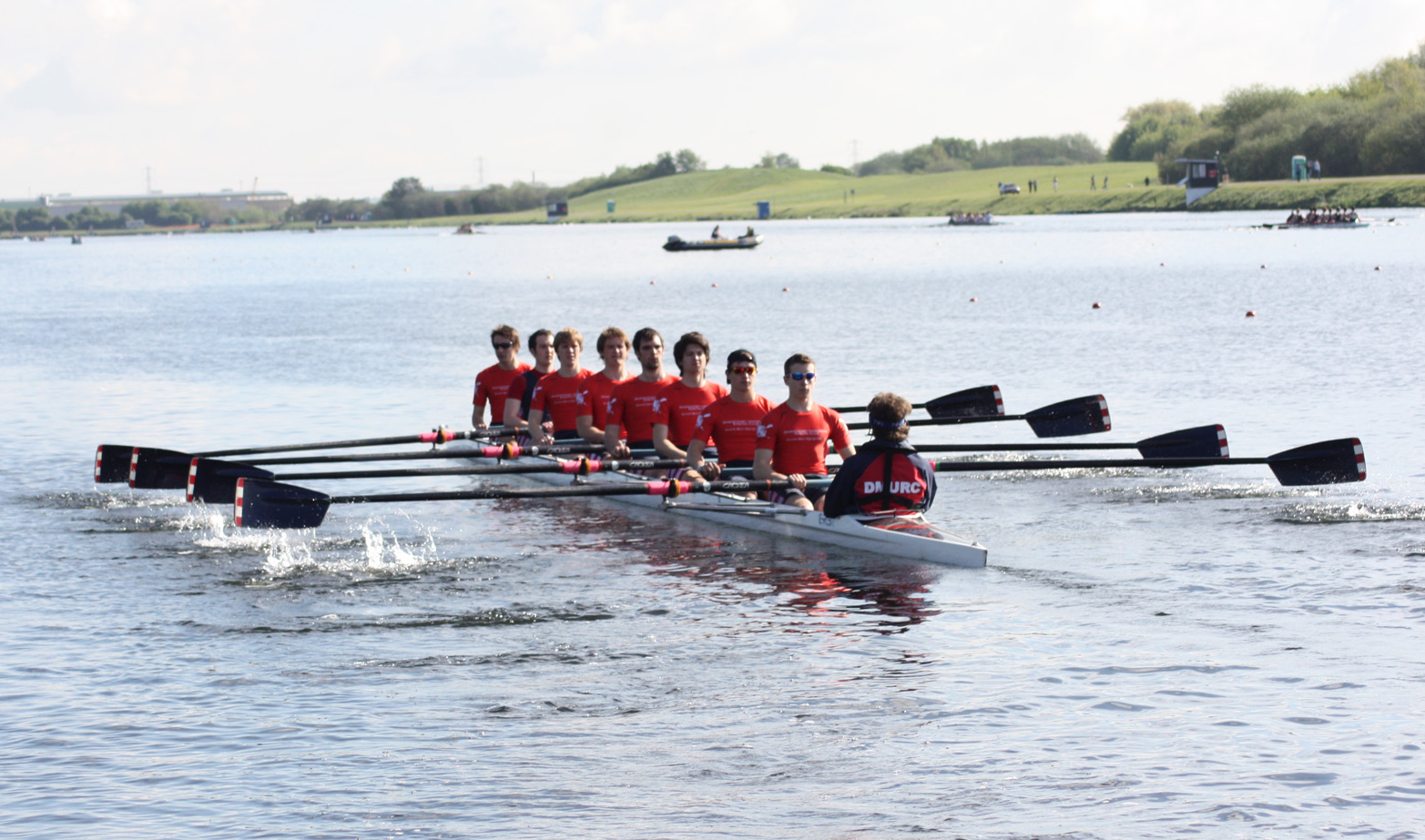
Rowers in an eight

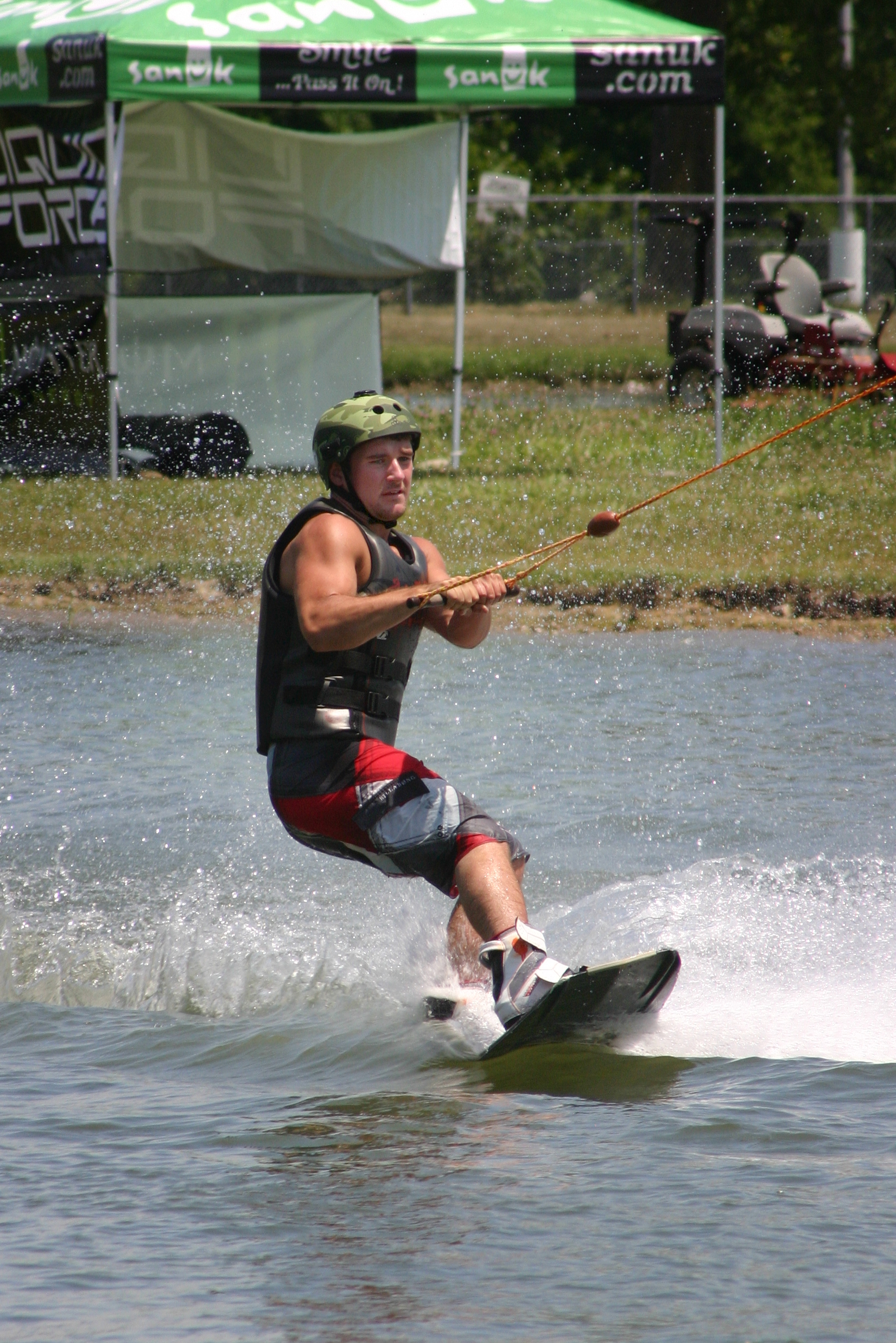
Cable wakeboarding

Wakesurfing

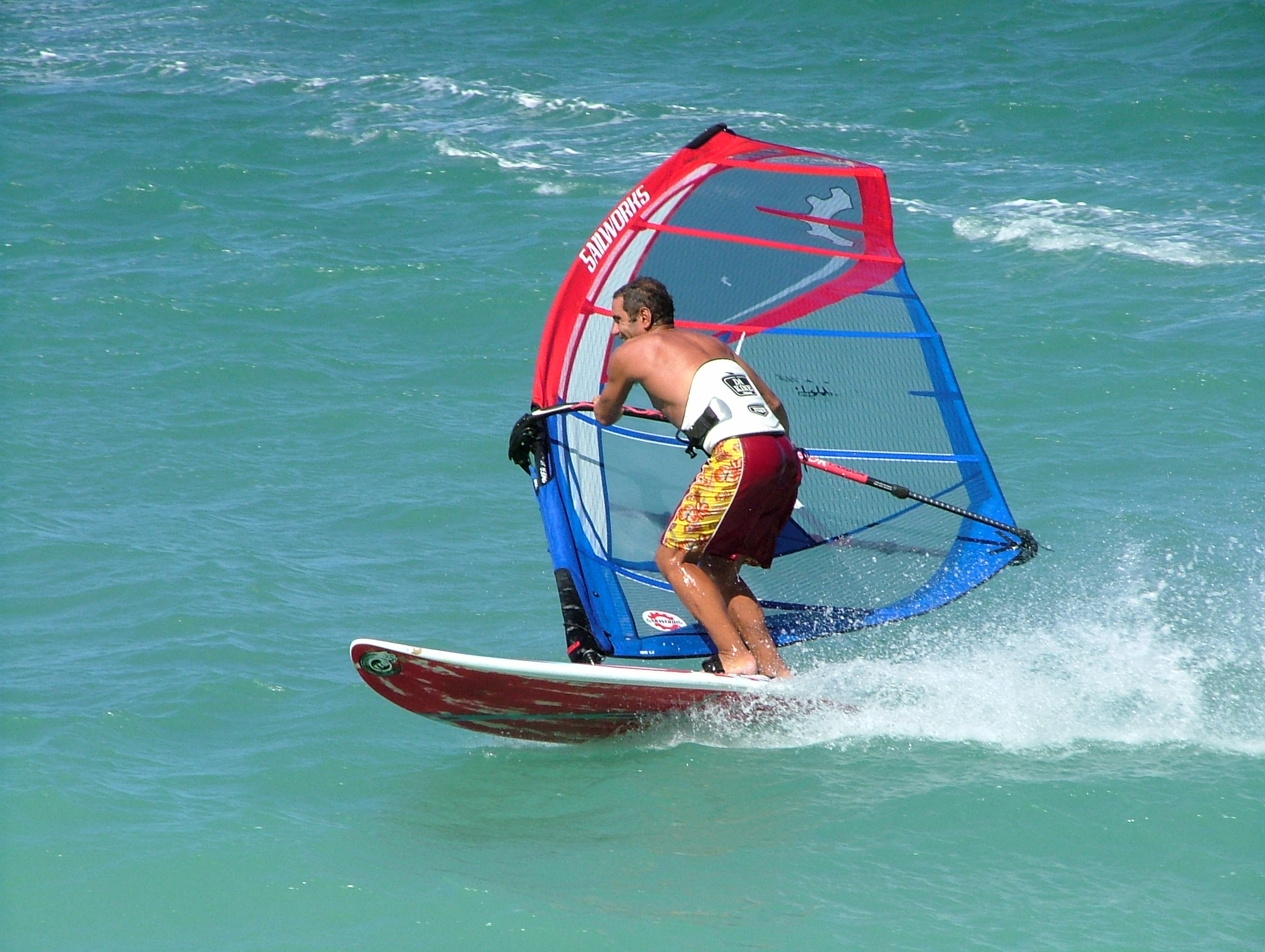
Windsurfing

== Long-duration Courses ==
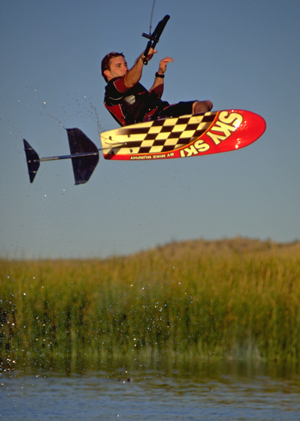
Sit-down hydrofoil

MBA- Tourism (Tourism & Travel) commenced from 2016-17 and PhD (Tourism Management) in July 2018. The program of BBA- Tourism & Travel is also being planned to commence in a year period.

== Short-duration Courses ==
These are meant for certification and licensing to handle various operations and are broadly of three categories: skill enhancement, professional and management courses.

Skill Courses

- Windsurfing
- Dinghy Sailing (Enterprise Class)
- Waterskiing
- Kayaking
- River Rafting

Professional Courses

- Out Board Motor Maintenance (Basic)
- Out Board Motor Maintenance (Advanced)
- FRP Boat Repair
- Tiller-controlled Power Boat Handling (PBH-T)
- Remote Controlled Powerboat Handling (PBH-R)
- Life Saving Techniques for Water-sport Operator (LST-WS)
- Life Saving Techniques for Water-park Lifeguard (LST-WP)
- Life Saving Techniques for Pool Lifeguard (LST-P)
- Surf Life Saving Techniques (SLST-S)
- Silver Certification for Beach Lifeguard
- Surf Life Saving Techniques (SLST-G)
- Gold Certification for Beach Lifeguard
- CPR Training
- CPR Demonstration Programme

For Resorts and Industries

- PWC / Jet Ski Conversion
- Parasail boat conversion course (Remote/ Level-3)
- Parasail Operations
- Sea Rescue and Equipment Operations

Management Courses

- Watersport Centre Management
- Watersport Orientation Programme for Executives (Course fee includes boarding and lodging)
- Communication Skills for Watersport Instructors
- Entrepreneurship Development Programme

== Setting-up of Infrastructure ==
During the setting up of the Institute at Caranzalem, there were oppositions from some sections of local fishermen citing that it could affect the traditional fishing in the area and thereby their livelihood. The Goenchea Raponkarancho Ekvott (GRE), an organization of fishermen also submitted a memorandum to the Goa government against setting up of the campus, citing that it would violate the coastal regulation (CRZ) zone guidelines. However, the authorities of the Institute clarified the matter to concerned agencies of the government and the local communities and there is no violation of CRZ stipulations. According to them, the concerns are misplaced and the full-fledged infrastructure would rather be complementary and beneficial to the local communities. The concept and the design of the Institute are such that it nourishes the ecosystem around. Media also reported that all necessary permissions are in place for the development of the campus. The apprehensions of the local communities were also clarified since there was some misunderstanding on its impacts. This environment-friendly infrastructure would be fully operational very shortly. http://timesofindia.indiatimes.com/city/goa/Water-sports-institute-to-get-new-iconic-building-at-Caranzalem/articleshow/26377677.cms

== Publications ==
NIWS has published two papers with regard to water sports and tourism.

- A Report on Problems and Prospects Of Accessible Tourism In India
- A Report on Analyzing the Factors Responsible for Slow-Down in Tourist Arrivals in India
- HSRT: A Report on Evaluation of the Hunar se Rozgar Tak (From Skill Development to Employment) Scheme in India
- Tourism Development Revisited
- Coastal Tourism Development: Patterns & Issues

Apart from the two papers, NIWS has also come out with a brochure on Safety Norms for Watersports.
