= V. V. Giri National Labour Institute =

- Formation: 1974; 52 years ago
- Type: Civil Service training institute
- Purpose: Labour Research
- Location: Noida, India
- Region served: India
- Director General: Dr. H. Srinivas, IRPS
- Parent organisation: Government of India
- Website: http://www.vvgnli.gov.in/
- Formerly called: National Labour Institute

V. V. Giri National Labour Institute, under the Ministry of Labour of Government of India, is an autonomous civil service training institute dedicated to the research in the field of labour and training of civil servants which includes labour administrators, trade unions, public sector managers and other government functionaries concerned with labour.

Research related to Labour is one of the primary activities of the institute which also undertakes seminars, workshops and lectures on specific issues periodically.

Previously called National Labour Institute till 1995, it was renamed to its present name in the honour of V. V. Giri, former President of India, who was a well-known union leader in his early days.

== Governance ==
The Union Minister for Labour and Employment serves as the President of General Council. Other members of General Council include Central Government representatives, organization of employers and workers and members of Parliament. Additionally, persons who have made notable contributions in the field of labour are also part of the General Council.

The Executive Council is elected by the General Council and the Union Labour and Employment Secretary acts as its Chairperson.

A Director General serves as the administrative head of the institute.

== Research ==
V.V.Giri National Labour Institute will offer M.Phil. and Ph.D. courses from 2019 in collaboration with Jawaharlal Nehru University, New Delhi.
