= Allied Healthcare =

Nestor Primecare Services Limited, also known as Allied Healthcare, was the UK's largest domiciliary care business and a leading provider of outsourced healthcare services to the English primary care sector. In 2018 Nestor Primecare Service went into Creditors' Voluntary Liquidation ("CVL") and liquidators were appointed. Private equity firm Twenty20 Capital acquired Allied Healthcare and merged it with its existing homecare brand (CRG Homecare). HCRG Care Group (part of Twenty20) eventually sold CRG Homecare and Allied Healthcare to Cera Care.

== History ==
Allied Healthcare started in 1972, with a nursing home in Staffordshire and in 2011 when it was acquired by Saga group it had 140 branches across the UK and Ireland.

In December 2015, Saga agreed to sell Allied Healthcare to Aurelius Group, a mid-market, pan-european investor.

Nestor Primecare Services Ltd., registered in Stafford, was the legal entity behind the Allied Healthcare brand. It also provides Out-of-hours services.

On 21 April 2018, Allied Healthcare announced it would seek a Company Voluntary Arrangement to protect itself from creditors due to a "highly challenging environment", through it would continue to operate without redundancies. In November 2018 the Care Quality Commission issued a notice saying it had serious doubts about the future of the business and warned local authorities that they might have to intervene. The company said this was "premature and unwarranted" as they had secured further funding support. It subsequently announced it was exploring the sale or transition of services to alternative providers, including the transfer of staff. In November 2018 Nestor Primecare went into administration, it terminated its contract for the out-of-hours service in Birmingham in November 2018. The service was taken over by the Badger GP-run out-of-hours and urgent care cooperative.

In December 2018, significant parts of CRG Homecare and Allied Health care business was acquired by Health Care Resourcing Group(HCRG) from Aurelius. HCRG a specialist healthcare recruitment agency, took over any remaining care contracts at that time and in April 2020 the remaining Nestor Primecare business ceased trading and was wound up.

In 2023 Cera Care acquired CRG Homecare and Allied Healthcare from HCRG.

== Legal action ==
In October 2014 Allied Healthcare, then owned by Saga, was ordered to pay the legal costs of Elaine Fernandez, a nurse who was awarded more than £80,000 by an employment tribunal in 2013. It ruled she was unfairly dismissed and suffered detriment for making protected whistleblowing disclosures. The tribunal said the company had pursued a "defensive position" that was "unreasonably hostile". She had raised concerns after Hywel Dda Health Board which commissioned the company to provide nursing care for a disabled patient decided to replace nurses with healthcare assistants.

== See also ==
- Private medicine in the United Kingdom
