= Indian Institute of Soil Science =

Indian research institute

- Motto in English: Agrisearch with a Human Touch
- Type: Registered Society
- Director: Dr. Monoranjan Mohanty
- Location: Nabibagh, Bhopal, Madhya Pradesh, India; 23°18′35″N 77°24′11″E
- Nickname: IISS
- Website: iiss.icar.gov.in/index.html

The Indian Institute of Soil Science (acronym IISS) is an autonomous institute for higher learning, established under the umbrella of Indian Council of Agricultural Research (ICAR) by the Ministry of Agriculture, Government of India for advanced research in the field of soil sciences.

== Profile ==
The Indian Institute of Soil Science (IISS) was established in 1988, as an Indian Council of Agricultural Research subsidiary at the lake city of Bhopal, in Madhya Pradesh, India with an aim to promote scientific research on soil sciences. The Institute covers All India Coordinated Research Project (AICRP) on Soil Test Crop Response Studies at 17 centres, All India Coordinated Research Project (AICRP) on Micronutrients and All India Network Project on Biofertilizers at 11 centres each in India.

IISS provides training and research facilities on subjects such as Soil testing, Techniques for improving nutrient and water efficiency, Carbon sequestration and Soil quality assessment.

The Institute is equipped with facilities such as air conditioned conference hall, committee room, lecture theatres, audio-visual aids, laboratory facilities, library and guest house of international standards and maintains a research farm extending to 50 hectares.

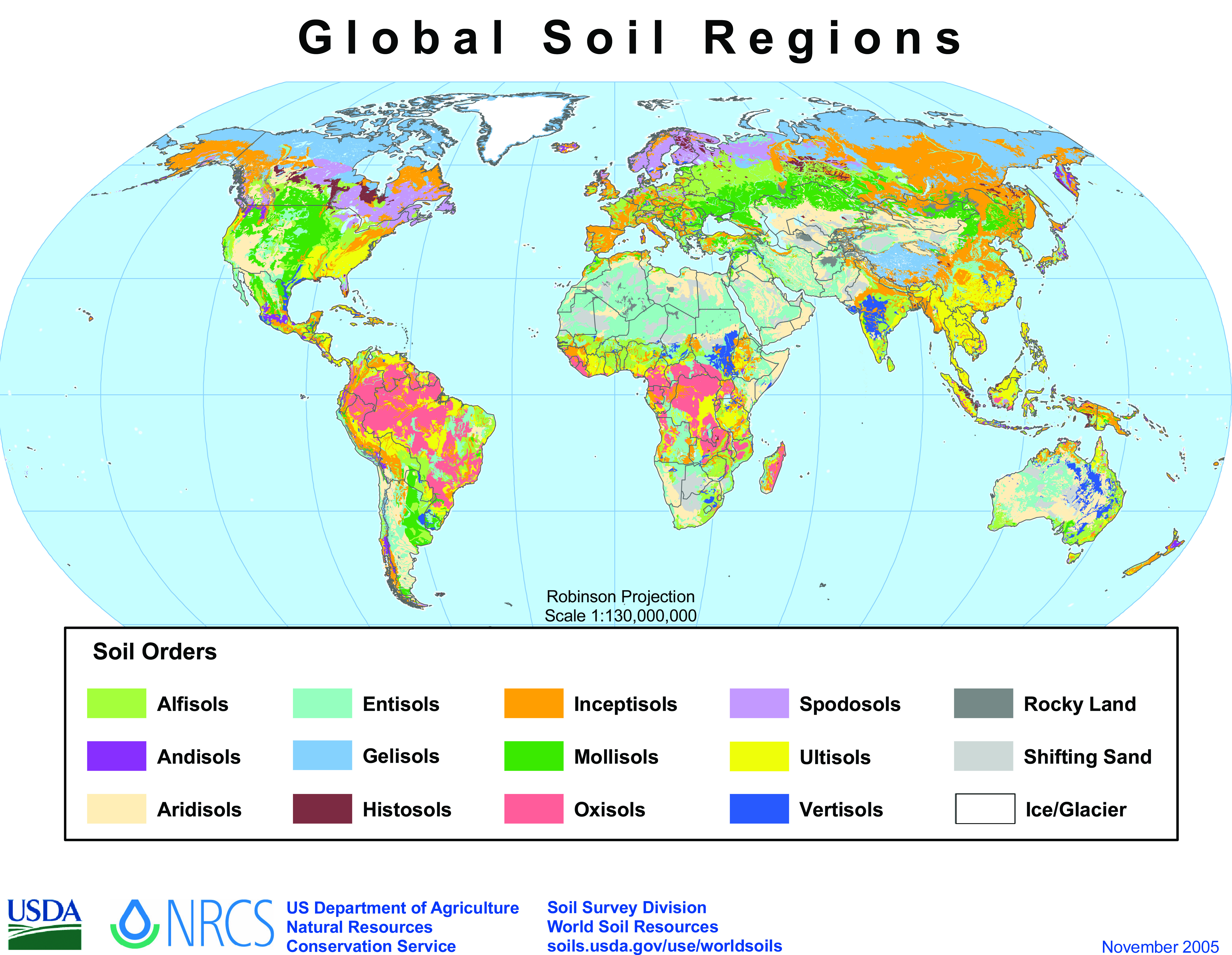
Map of global soil regions

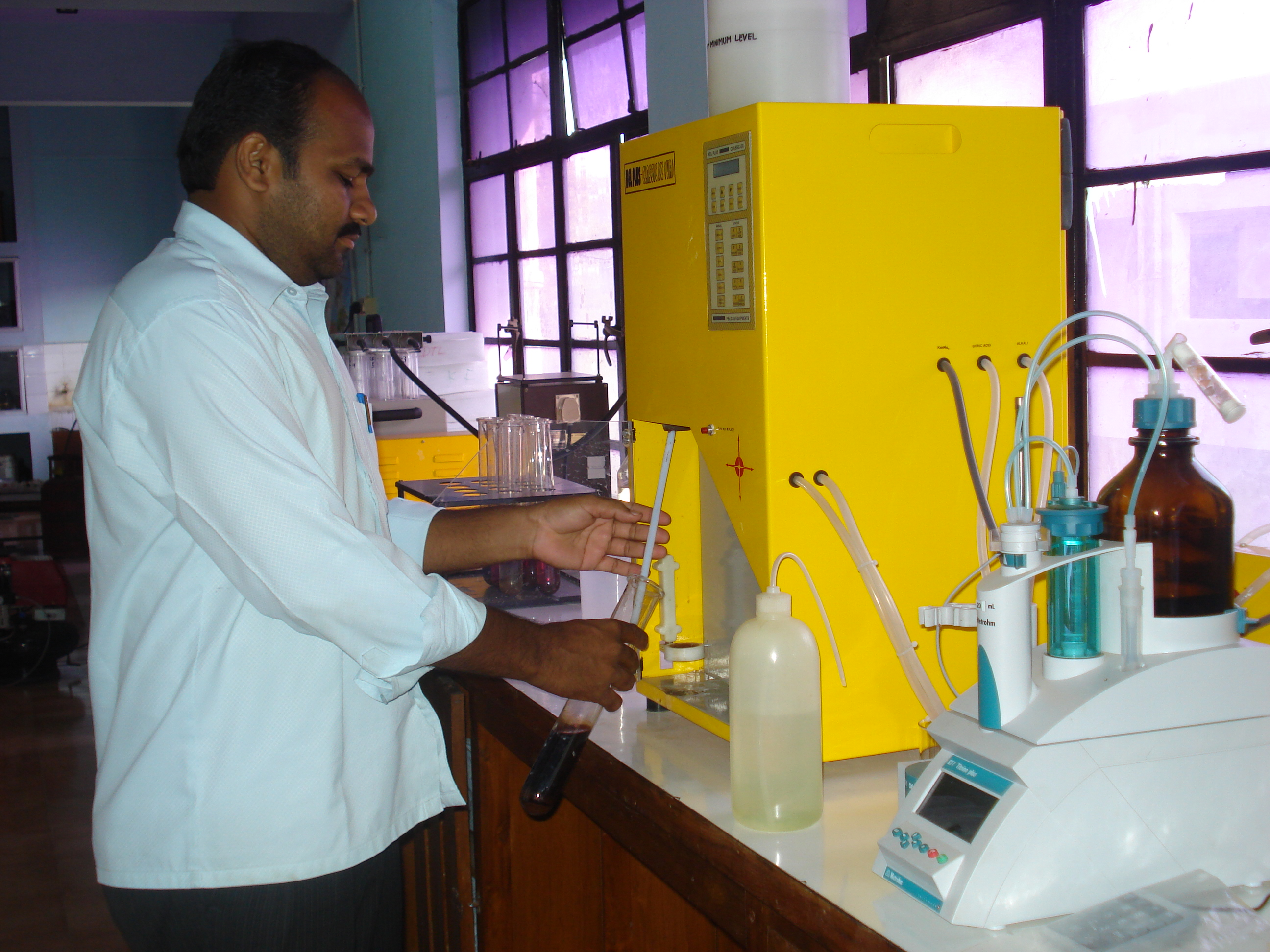
Soil testing in progress

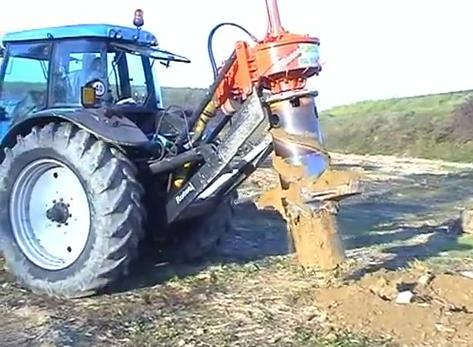
Stump harvesting increases the recovery of biomass.

== Mandate ==
The Institute is mandated to Provide Scientific Basis for Enhancing and Sustaining Productivity of Soil Resource with Minimal Environmental Degradation and the primary objectives are set as:

- Conduct of basic and advanced research on soil with regard to its physical, chemical and biological processes for efficient management of nutrients, water and energy.
- Identification of efficient and environment friendly soil management technologies.
- Assisting other research organizations in India on agriculture, forestry, fishery and environmental researches.
- Information exchange through various modes of information dissemination and collaboration with State Agricultural Universities and National and International Research Organizations.
- Development of database on soil science.

== Divisions ==
The Institute has been divided into six divisions, each taking care of an independent area of activity.

=== Soil Physics ===
Soil physics division oversees the research activities with regard to enhancement and sustaining of soil quality and productivity.

=== Soil Chemistry and Fertility ===
SCF division researches nutrient and nutrient supply in soils, and ways to improve its efficiency.

=== Soil Biology ===
The Soil Botany division researches ways to maintain soil biodiversity in agroecosystem.

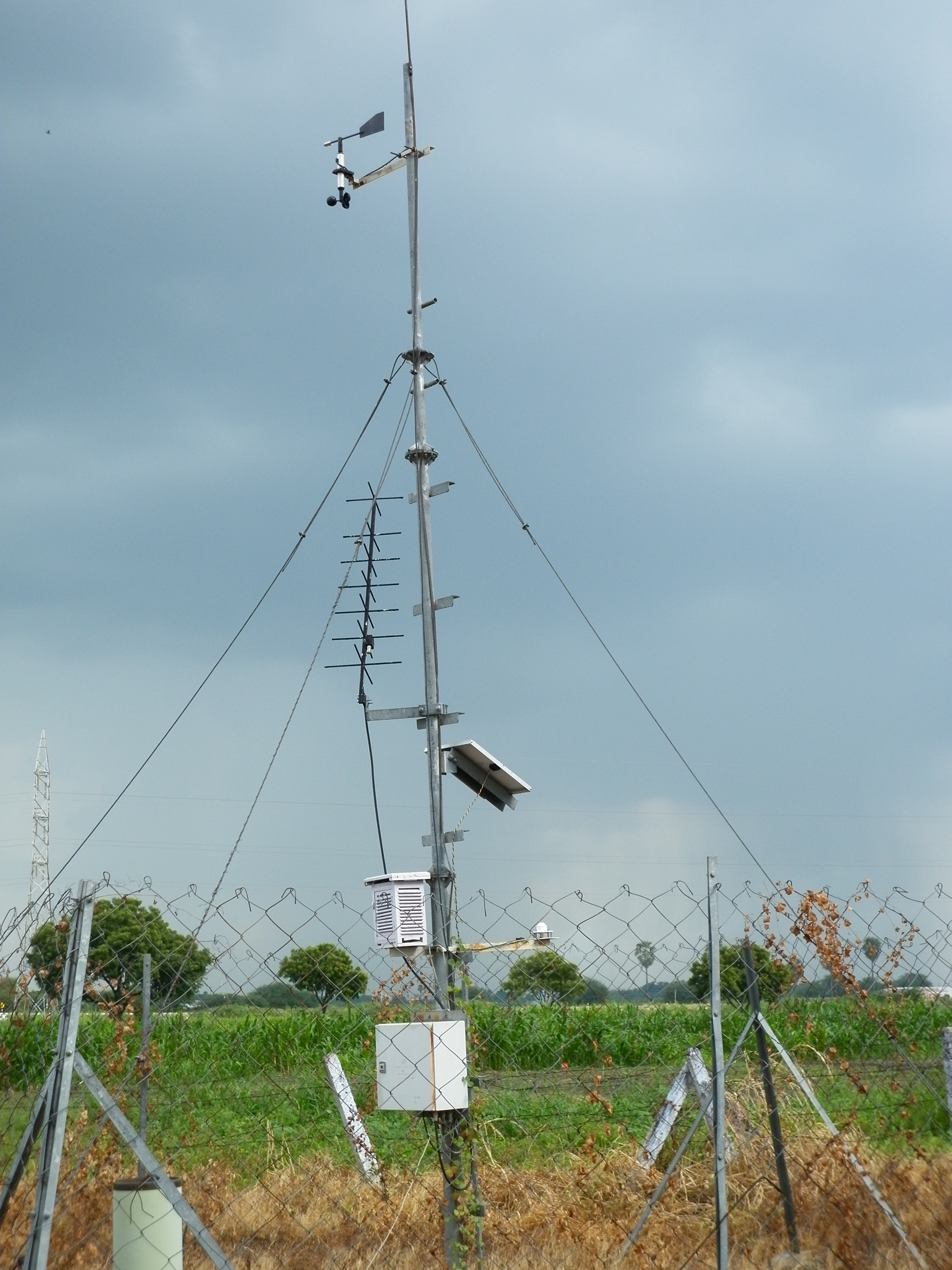
Automatic Weather Station

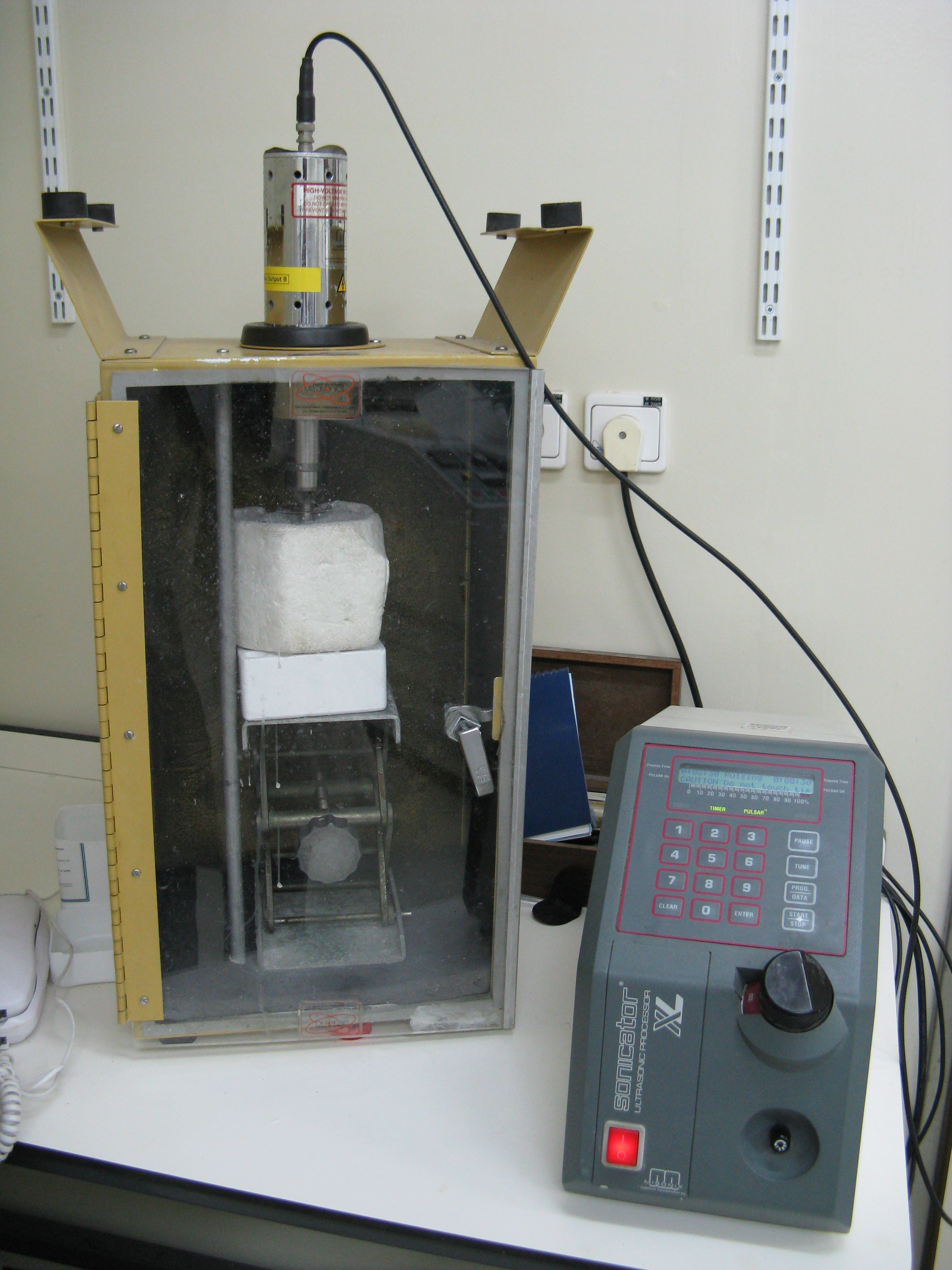
A Sonicator

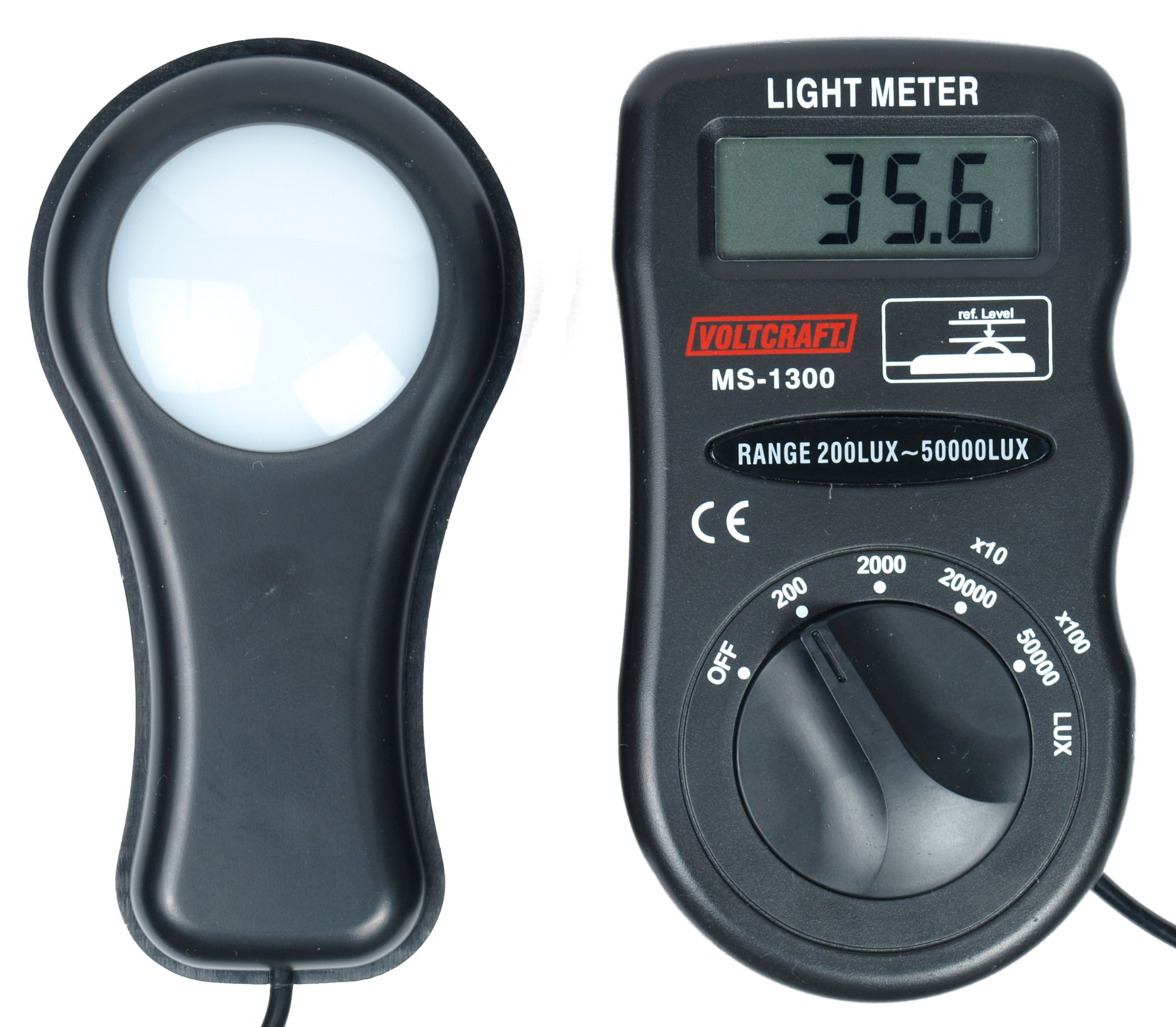
A Photometer

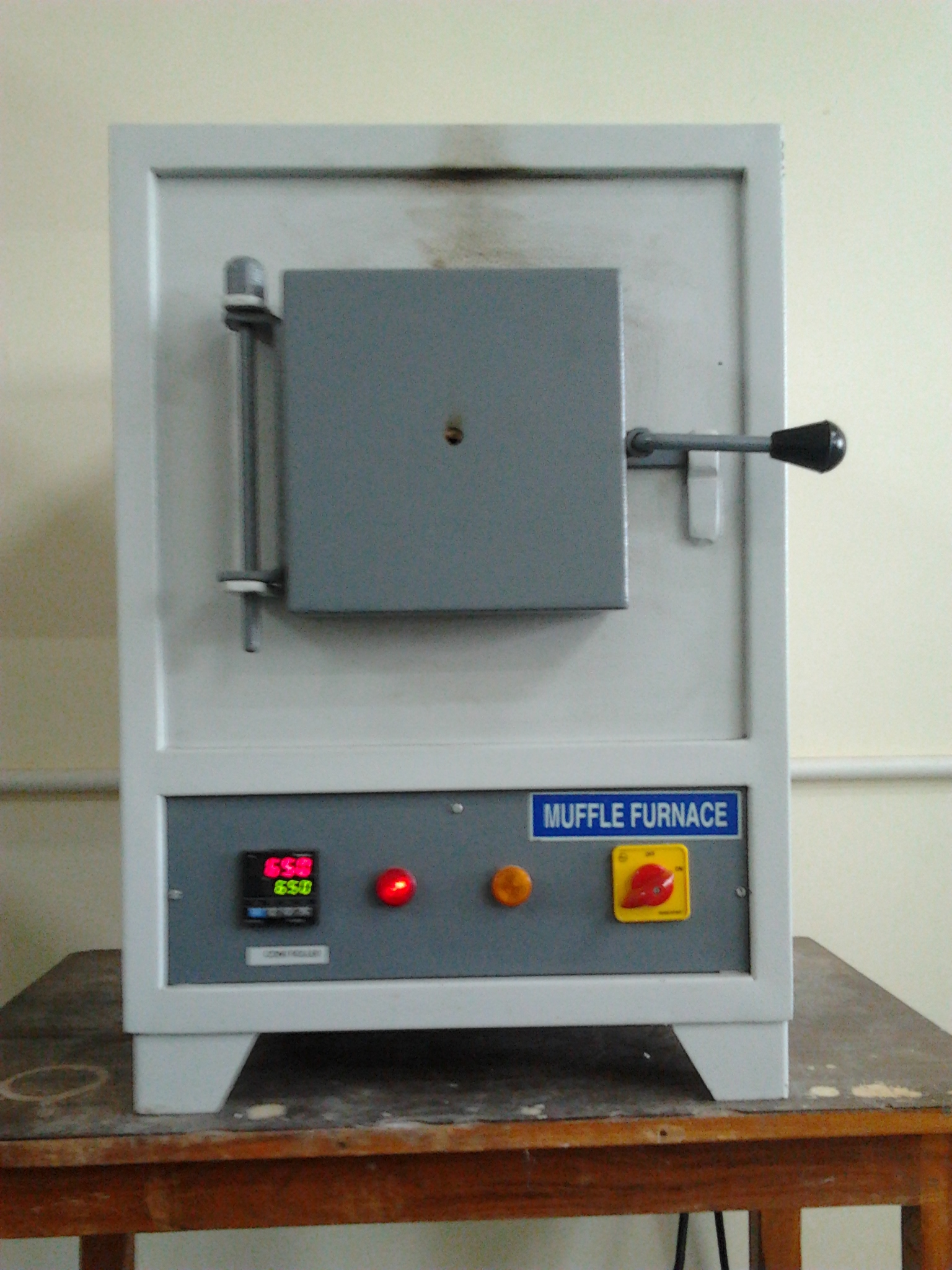
High temperature Muffle Furnace

=== Environmental Soil Science ===
The division maintains a database of the effect of soil pollution due to overuse of chemicals and tracks major environmental issues related to organic farming.

=== Statistics and Computer Application Section ===
The research activities of the division is focused on managing nutrient and water levels by applying statistics and computer applications.

=== Agricultural Knowledge Management Unit (AKMU) ===
IISS hosts an Agricultural Knowledge Management Unit (AKMU) to provide communication facilities to the scientists and the institute, in general. A 75 node LAN and an own email server are in place, operated with the assistance of institute owned VSAT. The web site of the institute is also maintained by the AKMU.

== Facilities ==
=== Library, Information and Documentation services ===
The Institute maintains a library which stocks 1805 books, 1281 Bound Journals, 661 Annual Reports, 28 Foreign Journals, and 43 Indian Journals. It provides document lending, reference and reprographic Services and has AGRIS database of the Food and Agriculture Organization of the United Nations.

=== Training and Referral Soil Testing Laboratory ===
TRSL laboratory assist the scientists to explore novel methods for soil and plant analysis and is equipped with soil and plant analysis equipment.

The other facilities include two screen houses for the conduct of pot experiments, conference hall and conference room fitted with audio visual equipment, training hostel, staff recreation club and indoor and outdoor games facilities.

== Research Projects ==
IISS undertakes research projects under All India Coordinator Research Projects (AICRP), some of which are:

Long-Term Fertilizer Experiments (LTFE) Project: Project on the impact of chemical fertilizer on productivity and soil quality. The project was inaugurated in 1970 and is carried out at 11 centres. The project is now known as Long-term fertilizer experiments to study changes in soil quality, crop productivity and sustainability after its mandate was expanded.

Soil Test Crop Response (STCR) Project: The beginning of the project was in 1967 and 13 centres are participating in the project.

PCM Project: The project, which started in 1967, aims to study the effects of micronutrient efficiency on various crop varieties. It is actively participated in by Punjab Agricultural University, Ludhiana. Eleven centres are participating in the project.

AINPB Project: The mandate of the project is set as:

- To exploit the soil biodiversity in various agro-ecologies for biofertilizer applications in diverse cropping systems.
- To study the impact of soil management practices on functional diversity of microorganisms involved in key microbial functions and soil health using genomic tools.
- Formulation and testing of mixed biofertilizers in diverse cropping systems.
- To improve biofertilizer technology with particular reference to quality, carriers, consortia and delivery systems.
- To diversify biofertilizer research and application in drylands, mountainous regions, tribal areas and other underexplored ecosystems.
- Research-Adoption-Impact continuum analysis of Biofertilizer usage

== Publications ==
- A. Subba Rao; Sanjay Srivastava (2001). Soil Test Based Fertilizer Recommendations for Targeted Yields of Crops. Indian Institute of Soil Science.
- C. L. Acharya, P. K. Ghosh, Indian Institute of Soil Science, A. Subba Rao (2001). Indigenous Nutrient Management Practices - Wisdom Alive in India. Indian Institute of Soil Science.
- C. L. Acharya (1998). Integrated Plant Nutrient Supply System for Sustainable Productivity. Indian Institute of Soil Science.
- Anand Swarup; D. Damodar Reddy; R. N. Prasad (1998). Long Term Soil Fertility Management through Integrated Plant Nutrient Supply. Indian Institute of Soil Science.
- Anand Swarup; D. Damodar Reddy; R. N. Prasad (1999). Sulfur Management for Soil seed and Pulse Crops. Indian Institute of Soil Science.
- P. Ramesh (2009). Efficient Use of On-Farm and Off-Farm Resources in Organic Farming. Indian Institute of Soil Science.
- K. Sammi Reddy (2008). Soil Science Research in India: A Bibliography of IISS Scientist's Research Contribution. Indian Institute of Soil Science.
- K. N. Singh; et al. (2007). Prescription of optimum doses of Fertilizers for targeted yield of crops through soil fertility maps in different status of India. Indian Institute of Soil Science.
- Guriqbal Singh (2010). Enhancing Productivity of Soybean _Wheat System by Balanced and Integrated Nutrient management on Black Soils of Madhya Pradesh. Indian Institute of Soil Science. ISBN 9781845936457.
- A.P. Singh (2006). Boron Nutrition of crops in soils of Bihar. Indian Institute of Soil Science.
- T. K. Ganguly (2006). Consultancy Services in soil Quality, Nutrient and water management Technologies and experts. Indian Institute of Soil Science.
- H. N. Rawankar (2004). Effect of Long Term Fertilizer Application and Cropping on the Sustenance of Soil Fertility and Productivity Under Sorghum-wheat Sequence in Vertisol. Indian Institute of Soil Science.
- Indian Institute of Soil Science (2004). Proceedings of the National Seminar on Standards and Technology for Rural/Urban Compost. Indian Institute of Soil Science.
- A. K. Mishra (2005). Proceedings of National Seminar on Existing Water resources and Technologies for Enhancing Agricultural Production in North Central India. Indian Institute of Soil Science.
- M. V. Singh (2004). Nutrient Dynamics, Crop Productivity and Sustainability under long term fertilizer Experiments in India. Indian Institute of Soil Science.
- S. P. Sharma (2005). Long term Effect of Fertilizer, Manure and lime Application on Changes in Soil Quality, Crop Productivity and Sustainability of maize-Wheat System in alfisol of North Himalayas. Indian Institute of Soil Science.
- M. Dakshinamoorthy (2005). Soil Quality. Crop Productivity and Sustainability as Influenced by Long term Fertilizer Application and Continuous Cropping of Finger millet-Maize-Cowpea Sequence in swell-Shrink Soil. Indian Institute of Soil Science.
- B. S. Brar (2004). Soil Quality, Crop Productivity and Sustainability Experiences under Long Term Maize-Wheat Cropping in Inceptisol. Indian Institute of Soil Science.

IISS has published many more books and research papers.

== See also ==
- Agriculture
- Agroecological restoration
- Agroecosystem
- Agroecosystem analysis
- Agronomy
- Agrophysics
- Biodynamic agriculture
- Dynamic equilibrium
- Ecology
- Integrated Pest Management
- Organic agriculture
- Rural Sociology
- Soil Science
