= Central Institute of Medicinal and Aromatic Plants =

Research institute

Coordinates: 26.8940°N 80.9816°E

- Type: Research institution
- Established: 1959; 67 years ago
- Director: Dr. Prabodh Kumar Trivedi
- Location: Lucknow, Uttar Pradesh, India
- Website: www.cimap.res.in/pages/

The Central Institute of Medicinal and Aromatic Plants, popularly known as CIMAP, is an Indian plant research laboratory and part of the Council of Scientific and Industrial Research (CSIR). Established originally as Central Indian Medicinal Plants Organisation (CIMPO) in 1959, CIMAP is steering multidisciplinary research in biological and chemical sciences and extending technologies and services to the farmers and entrepreneurs of medicinal and aromatic plants (MAPs). It is headquarterded in Lucknow and has research centres in Bangalore, Hyderabad, Pantnagar and Purara.

== History ==
Recognizing the urgent need for stimulating research on medicinal plants in the country and for coordinating and consolidating some work already done by organizations like the Indian council of Agricultural Research, Indian Council of Medical Research, Tropical School of Medicine of Culcutta and various States Governments and Individual workers, the Council Scientific and Industrial Research approved in 1957 the establishment of the Central Indian Medicinal Plants Organization (CIMPO) with the following objectives. ‘To co-ordinate and channelise along fruitful directions the present activities in the field of medicinal plants carried out by the various agencies, State Governments etc., to develop the already existing medicinal plants resources of India, to bring under cultivation some of the important medicinal plants in great demand and also to introduce the cultivation into the country of exotic medicinal plants of high yielding active principal content’ It was further decide that as the work on all aspects of cultivation of aromatics plants was identical with all the cultivation of medicinal plants, the aromatic plants should also be covered within the scope of CIMPO. The Essential Oils Research Committee functioning under the Council of Scientific & Industrial Research was then dissolved and its activities taken over by CIMPO. The Organization started functioning with effect from 26 March 1959 with the appointment of late Shri P.M. Nabar its first Officer Incharge.

The branch in Hyderabad was established on 7 July 1982.

In February 2024, CIMAP announced that it will set up a unit for the development of a synthetic biology platform for high-value phytomolecules.

== Research ==
CIMAP Research Centres are aptly situated in different agro-climatic zones of the country to facilitate multi-location field trials and research. A little more than 50 years since its inception, today, CIMAP has extended its wings overseas with scientific collaboration agreements with Malaysia. CSIR-CIMAP has signed two agreements to promote bilateral cooperation between India and Malaysia in research, development and commercialization of MAP related technologies.

Mint varieties released and agro-packages developed and popularised by CIMAP has contributed to India's global lead in mints and related industrial products. CIMAP has released several varieties of the MAPs, their complete agro-technology and post harvest packages contributing to the MAPs cultivation and business scenario of India.
