= Institute for Studies in Industrial Development =

Indian research institute

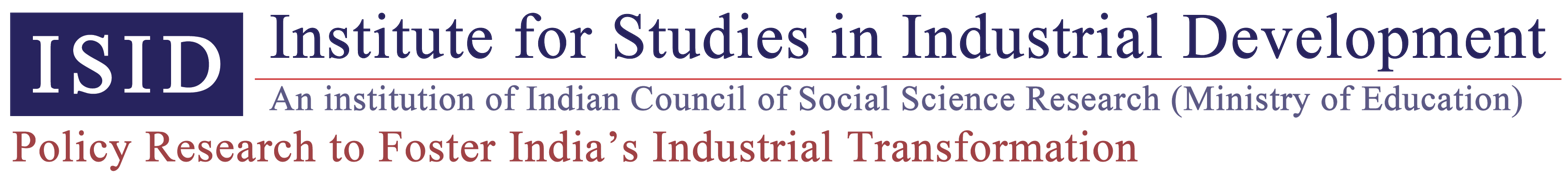
- Former name: Corporate Studies Group (CSG)
- Motto in English: Policy Research to Foster India's Industrial Transformation
- Type: Registered Society, Doctoral Educational Institution
- Established: October 7, 1986
- Affiliations: Jawaharlal Nehru University
- Chairman: S. K. Misra
- Director: Prof. Nagesh Kumar
- Total staff: More than 20
- Students: Below 30
- Location: Vasant Kunj, New Delhi, Delhi, India; 28°32′36.9″N 77°08′53.2″E
- Campus: Urban
- Nickname: ISID
- Website: isid.org.in
- Indian Council of Social Science Research subsidiary

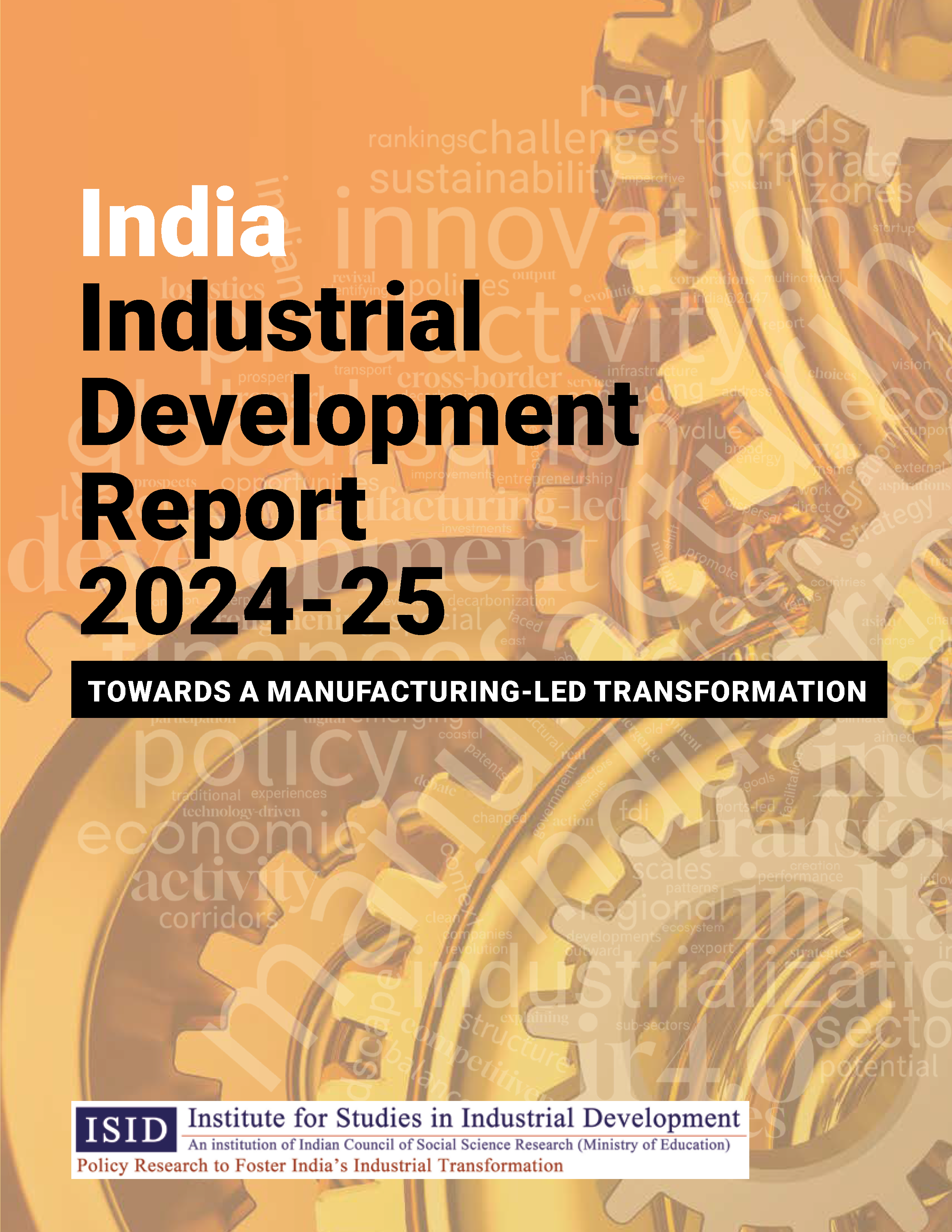
India Industrial Development Report 2024-25

The Institute for Studies in Industrial Development (ISID) is a public-funded, autonomous institution dedicated to conducting policy research, advocacy, capacity-building, and outreach activities to foster the industrial transformation of India.

Registered on October 7, 1986, under the Indian Societies Registration Act 1860, ISID in 1988, became one of the institutions that are supported by the Indian Council of Social Science Research (ICSSR), (Government of India), through grants-in-aid. Since 2006, the Institute operates from its own well-appointed campus located in the Vasant Kunj Institutional Area in South Delhi.

ISID is recognized as a Scientific and Industrial Research Organization (SIRO) by the Government of India. It is also listed on DARPAN portal of NITI Aayog (India’s Planning Agency) as a recognized think-tank. It is also a member of the Asia-Pacific Research Network on Trade (ARTNet) and the South Asia Network on SDGs (SANS) of the United Nations Economic and Social Commission for Asia and the Pacific (UNESCAP). ISID’s Databases and e-resources are accessed by the academic community across the country through the Information and Library Network (INFLIBNET) Centre of the University Grant Commission (UGC).

The institute runs PhD Program in Economics and Public Policy (PEPP) which is academically affiliated with Jawaharlal Nehru University, New Delhi. With a specilaized focus on industralization and related public policy, the program combines one year of extensive coursework and doctoral dissertation research, preparing scholars for careers in academia, policymaking, development institutions and research think tanks.

== ISID: Policy Research to Foster India’s Industrial Transformation ==
Manufacturing-led transformation has been an important pathway to prosperity globally—employed by developed countries such as the US, Germany, and Japan, as well as newly industrialised countries such as the Republic of Korea, Taiwan, and China.

As India embarks on achieving its aspiration to achieve a developed country status by 2047, the manufacturing sector seems to be an answer to creating decent jobs for its youthful population and fostering inclusive prosperity.

ISID seeks to support India’s manufacturing-led transformation through its policy research, advocacy, capacity-building and outreach activities.

== Research Themes & Key Projects ==
Theme	Activity
Industrial Structure, Policies, Employment, and Statistics	The India Industrial Development Reports (IIDRs); Future of Manufacturing in South Asia: Inputs for the UNIDO’s Industrial Development Report 2025-26; Strategies for Escaping the Middle Income Trap; Revamping the Industrial Statistics; Role of Public Sector in India in the Changed Global Context; Trends in Corporate Performance in the Manufacturing Sector
Leveraging MSMEs and Start-ups for Industrial Transformation	Envisioning the Role of MSMEs in India’s Industrial Transformation; Towards Resilient and Sustained Growth of the MSME Sector in India: Lessons from the COVID-19 Pandemic; Entrepreneurship, Innovation and Job Creation: A Study of India’s Start-ups Ecosystem; Financial Accessibility, Institutional Environment and Participation of MSMEs in the GVCs; Informal Enterprises and MSMEs in Textiles and Clothing Value-chain; UK-India Bilateral Trade in Fintech and Fintech-Enabled Services: Emerging Trends and Potential for Growth
Globalization, FDI, Trade and GVC Participation	Deepening India’s Integration with the Japanese and Korean GVCs; Leveraging FDI for India’s Industrial Transformation: Magnitudes, Quality, Challenges and Opportunities; Liberalisation, International Trade, and Industrial Productivity in Indian Manufacturing; Enhancing the Effectiveness of India’s Trade Agreements with South Korea and Japan; Strategy for Leveraging ASEAN FTA and Trade Potential with the Middle East Countries for Pharma Sector in India
Technology, Innovation and Industry 4.0	R&D Scenario in Indian Pharma Industry to meet the Global Challenges; Emergence of a Leading Global Innovative Firm from India; Empowering MSMEs through IPR Awareness and Management; Technological Changes, Skill Requirement and Labour Demand in the Construction Sector; Determinants of Innovation by Indian Enterprises
Green Industrialization	Towards a Green Industrial Strategy for India and other Emerging Economies; Enhancing the Policy Space for Sustainable Industrialization: Issues for the G-20 Agenda; Identifying Enablers for Green Transition of MSMEs in India; Sustainable Industrialization and Innovation: Accelerating SDG-9 Achievement in South Asia
Spatial Dimensions of Industrial Development and Industrial Infrastructure	Trends in Inter-Regional Disparities in Indian Manufacturing; Exploring the Product Space Map of the Indian Manufacturing; Landscape of Regional Manufacturing in India: Reflections from Commodity Flow Analysis; Spatial Dynamics of Manufacturing Landscape in India: A District Level Comparative Analysis of Pre- and Post-Reform Contexts; Regional Disparities across States in India
Sectoral Studies on Competitiveness of Indian Manufacturing	Rapid Growth of Labour-intensive Sectors in India-Textiles, Leather, Gems and Jewellery and Food Processing; Make-in-India: An Assessment of the Impact on Six Manufacturing Sectors; Fostering Medical Device Industry of India; Import Dependence, Technology Gaps and International Competitiveness of Indian Electrical Equipment Industry; Electrical Equipment Sector: Technology Gaps, Technology Transfer, and Import Dependence; Non-Electrical Machinery Industry: Technological Change and Competitiveness in Machine Tools Industry; Automobile Industry: Technology, Changing Product Lines and Policy Initiatives

== Conferences Policy Dialogues and Research Seminars ==
National Conferences on India's Industrial Transformation

ISID instituted, in 2023, an annual series of flagship conferences on India’s industrialization at which policy makers, industry leaders as well as young researchers from across the top institutions in the country present their insights and research.

Policy Dialogues

ISID organizes policy roundtables with senior exports and policy makers on themes of contemporary relevance throughout the year.

Research Seminars

ISID Seminar Series provides a platform to in-house as well as outside researchers to present their new research.

== The PhD Program in Economics and Public Policy ==
As a premier national institute dedicated on industrial development, it launched a specialized PhD Program in Economis and Public Policy in 2024-25, in collaboration with the Jawaharlal Nehru University, which awards the degree. The program is focused on industrial development, structural transformation, and related public policy issues. Since its inception, three batches have admitted compromising promising scholars from across India and abroad with strong academic and professional background in economics and allied disciplines.

== Capacity-Building Activities ==
Capacity-Building Programmes for University Teachers and Researchers

ISID also organizes capacity-building and research methodology programmes focused on industrialization for faculty members and researchers of academic institutions, typically ranging for two-weeks but also shorter duration.

== Publications ==
- Reimagining India–Korea Economic Partnership: Pathways to Deeper Integration, edited by Reji K Joseph & Byungyul Park, published by ISID, KIET, December 2025.
- An ERIA-CII-ISID Study on India–Japan Economic Partnership for Resilient and Diversified Value Chains, Anita Prakash (Ed), Nagesh Kumar, Danish A Hashim, So Umezaki, Shiro Armstrong, and Samuel Hardwick, Economic Research Institute for ASEAN and East Asia, August 2025
- FDI, MSMEs, Digitalization, and Green Industrialization: Challenges, Opportunities and Policy Lessons for India, Editors Nagesh Kumar, Satyaki Roy, Springer Singapore, March 2025
- Inclusive Economic Growth in India: Inducing Prosperity and Ending Deprivations, Shiladitya Chatterjee, Routledge, December 2024
- India Industrial Development Report 2024-25, by the research team of ISID, published by Academic Foundation, November 2024.
- EPW Special Issue on India's Industrial Transformation, guest edited by Prof Nagesh Kumar, Special Issue of Economic & Political Weekly (EPW), August 2024.
- Anjali Tandon, (2023), “Labour and Capital Use in Indian Manufacturing: Structural Aspects”, Routledge, India.
- Shailender Kumar Hooda, (2022), “Health Sector, State and Decentralised Institutions in India”, Routledge, India.
- Saraswathy, B (2018), “The Globalisation of Indian Business: Cross-border Mergers and Acquisitions in Indian Manufacturing”, Routledge, UK.* Sakthivel Selvaraj; Dinesh Abrol; K.M. Gopakumar (2014). Access to Medicines in India. Institute for Studies in Industrial Development. Archived from the original on 8 November 2016.
- Professor S.K. Goyal (2014). India's Policy Milieu: Economic Development, Planning and Industry. Institute for Studies in Industrial Development. Archived from the original on 24 January 2017.
- Satyaki Roy (2013). Small and Medium Enterprises in India: Infirmities and Asymmetries in Industrial Clusters. Routledge, Oxon.
- K.S. Chalapati Rao; Biswajit Dhar (2011). India's FDI Inflows: Trends and Concepts. Institute for Studies in Industrial Development.
- Sunanda Sen; Byasdeb Dasgupta (2009). Unfreedom and Waged Work: Labour in India's Manufacturing Industry. Sage Publication India. ISBN 978-8178299402.
- T.S. Papola (2008). Labour Regulation in Indian Industry (Volume 1–10). Bookwell Publishers.
- S.R. Hashim; K.S. Chalapati Rao; K.V.K. Ranganathan; M.R. Murthy (2008). Indian Industrial Development and Globalisation: Essays in Honour of Professor S.K. Goyal. Institute for Studies in Industrial Development.
- T.P. Bhat; Atulan Guha; Mahua Paul (2008). India and China: Building Complementarities and Competitiveness into WTO Regime. Bookwell Publishers.
- Jaya Prakash Pradhan (2008). Indian Multinationals in the World Economy: Implications for Development. Bookwell Publishers.
- S.R. Hashim; N.S. Siddharthan (2008). High-tech Industries, Employment and Global Competitiveness. Routledge, Taylor & Francis Group.
- Jaya Prakash Pradhan; Partha Pratim Sahu (2008). Transnationalization of Indian Pharmaceutical SMEs. Bookwell Publishers.
- Institute for Studies in Industrial Development (2006). ISID Index Series: Volume One (Revised ed.). Economic and Political Weekly (1966 - 2006).
- T.S. Papola; D.N. Awasti (2004). Enterprise Development in Mountain Areas: Guidelines for Entrepreneurs, Promotional Agencies and Policy Makers. Himalaya Publishing House.
- Institute for Studies in Industrial Development (ISID) and Indian Economic Association Trust for Research & Development (1998). ISID Index Series: Volume Two, Sixteen Economic Journals. Institute for Studies in Industrial Development.
- Institute for Studies in Industrial Development (1998). ISID Index Series: Forty Years of The Indian Journal of Labour Economics Index: 1958-1997. Institute for Studies in Industrial Development & Indian Society of Labour Economics.
- Institute for Studies in Industrial Development (1996). ISID Index Series: Volume One (Economic and Political Weekly 1966-1996). Institute for Studies in Industrial Development & Indian Economic Association Trust for Research & Development.
- Delhi Atlas, 2d Edition. Institute for Studies in Industrial Development. 1996.
- Pitou van Dijck; Rao K.S. Chalapati (1994). India's Trade Policy and the Export Performance of Industry. Sage.
- Institute for Studies in Industrial Development (1994). Economic Liberalization and Indian Agriculture. Institute for Studies in Industrial Development.
- Institute for Studies in Industrial Development (1993). Delhi Atlas: Colony and Area Maps. Institute for Studies in Industrial Development.
- Chandra Sekhar (1992). Political Economy of India. Vikas.
- Institute for Studies in Industrial Development (1989). Patterns in Indian Agricultural Development: A District Level Study. Institute for Studies in Industrial Development.
- S. K. Goyal (1979). Monopoly Capital and Public Policy. Allied Publishers.

== The Facilities ==
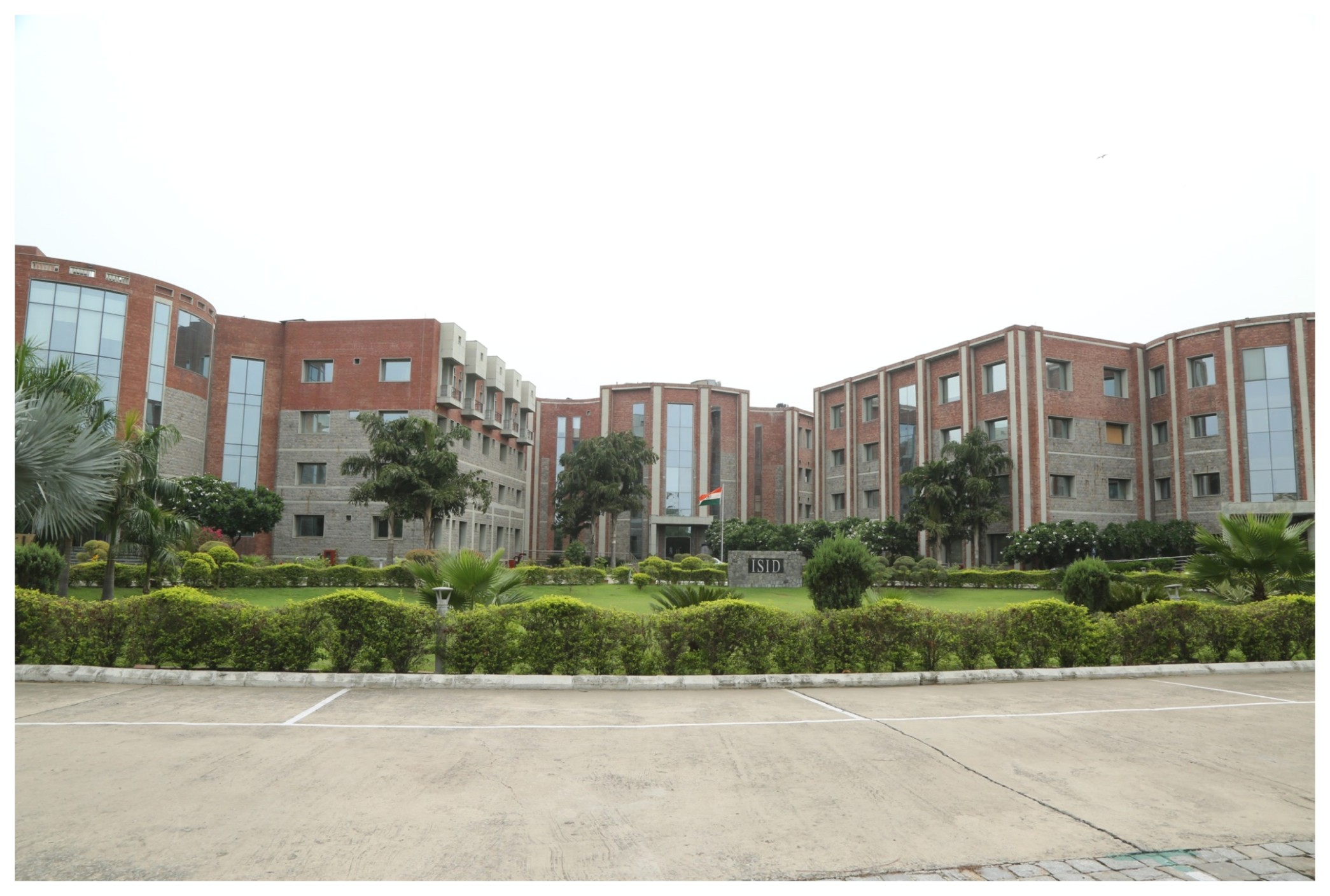
ISID campus view

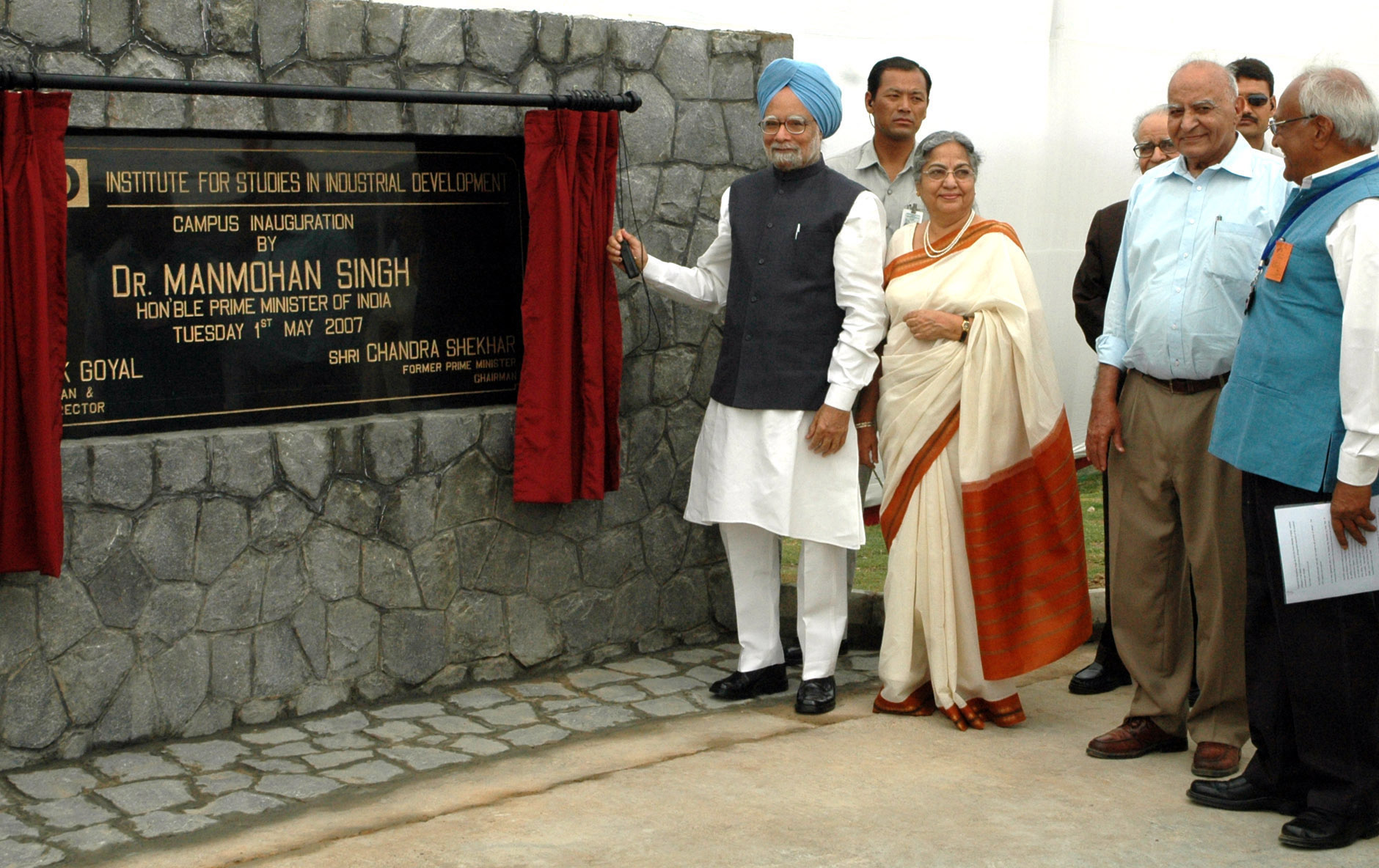
The then Prime Minister Dr. Manmohan Singh, unveiling the plaque to inaugurate the ISID campus on May 01, 2007

=== The Campus and Research Facilities ===
ISID is equipped with a well-stocked library, specialized in documentation and databases on industrialization and development. It maintains its own databases on industrial development which are accessed by other academic institutions through INFLIBNET of UGC. ISID also has state-of-the-art conferencing facilities and a guest house to facilitate residential academic activities.

== See also ==
- Deindustrialisation
- Division of labour
- Great Divergence
- Idea of Progress
- Newly industrialised country
- Urbanisation
