= National Institute of Rural Development =

Indian research organization

The National Institute of Rural Development and Panchayati Raj (abbreviated as NIRDPR) is an Indian autonomous research organisation under the Ministry of Rural Development, Government of India, located in Hyderabad, Telangana. In addition to the main campus at Hyderabad, the institute has a north-eastern regional centre at Guwahati, Assam to meet the needs of North-east India and a regional centre in New Delhi.

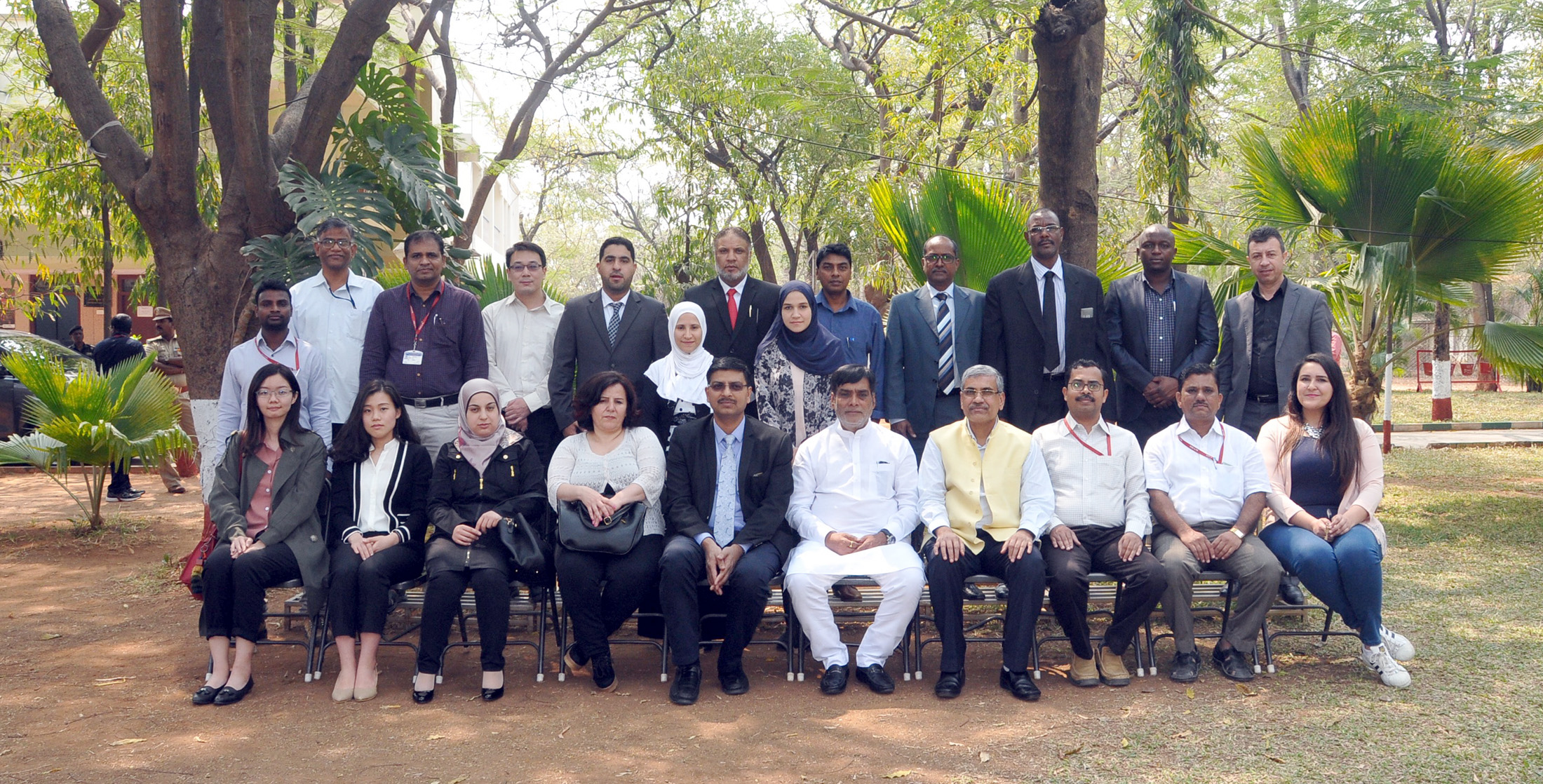
National Institute of Rural Development and Panchayati Raj, Police Quarters, Rajendranagar mandal

== History ==
The institute was first named the National Institute of Community Development (NICD). It was founded in 1964 as the Central Institute of Study and Research in Community Development at Mussoorie (now in Uttarakhand) and the Trainers Training Institute at Rajpur merged together.

== Controversies ==
=== Sexual harassment allegations ===
There have been allegations of rampant sexual harassment of women inside NIRDPR campus. In 2018 Satyaranjan Mahakul, an assistant professor of NIRD was arrested by Cyberabad Police on charges of molesting an Indonesian student. In 2015 NIRDPR Associate Professor Dr V Suresh Babu had been penalised for sexually abusing Assistant Professor Dr G. Valentina. However CAT deemed the penalty as unjust.

=== Corruption allegations ===
There have been several allegations of corruption by NIRDPR officials, including by faculty members and class-IV staff
