= Lutyens Bungalow Zone =

Area in Lutyens' Delhi

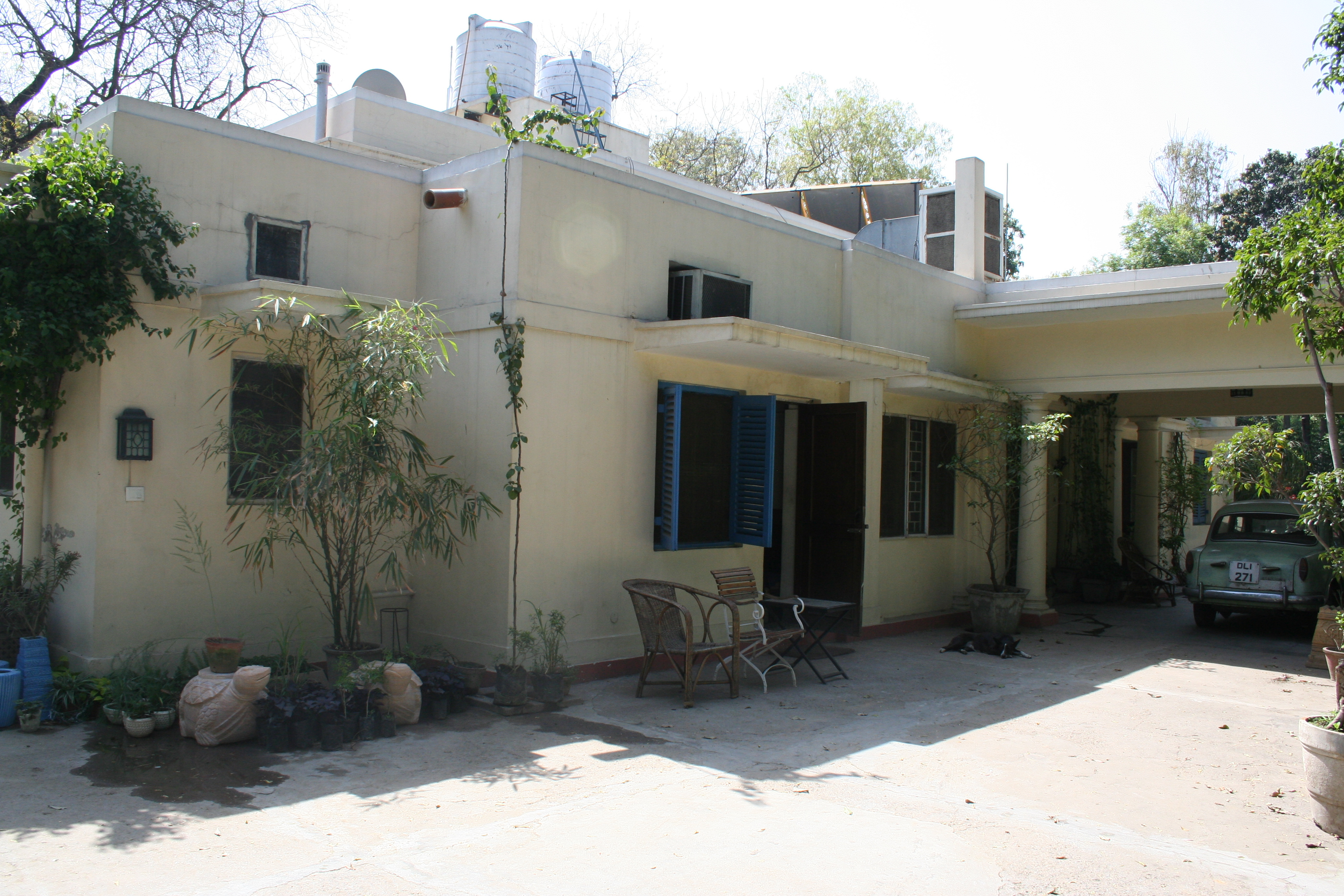
One of Lutyens' bungalows in Delhi.

Lutyens Bungalow Zone or LBZ is a precinct located within Lutyens' Delhi, spreads over an area of 2,800 hectares (6,900 acres), playing hosts to palatial bungalows for government ministers and officials, and administrative offices. Constructed during the British Raj for imperial British functionaries, it now lies within the administrative ambit of the Government of India.

== History ==
The development of the Lutyens' Bungalow Zone took place during the establishment of New Delhi as the new imperial capital of the British Raj following George V's proclamation decreeing the relocation of the seat of government from Calcutta in 1911. Like that for Lutyens' Delhi, the work of the LBZ was overseen primarily by Edwin Landseer Lutyens, its eponymous chief architect.

The Ministry of Urban Development constituted the New Delhi Redevelopment Advisory Committee (NDRAC) in 1972 to formulate development control norms against the backdrop of the redevelopment of the areas around the Walled City of Old Delhi, located north of Connaught Place, and on Prithviraj Road was taken up. Thus, the Lutyens Bungalow Zone (LBZ) was first notified in 1988 and later modified in 2003. In 2002, the World Monuments Fund placed the area on the World Monuments Watch.

== Notable bungalows ==
- 7, Race Course Road
- 10, Janpath
- Baroda House
- Bikaner House
- Dholpur House
- Hyderabad House
- Jaisalmer House
- Jamnagar House
- Jodhpur House
- Kota House
- Darbhanga House
- Patiala House
