= Dholpur House =

Building in Delhi, India

Coordinates: 28.608204°N 77.226728°E

General information
- Architectural style: Art Deco
- Location: India
- Current tenants: Union Public Service Commission
- Opening: 1920s

The Dholpur House was constructed in 1920 by Maharaj-Rana Udai bhan Singh, the Ruler of erstwhile princely state of Dholpur. It was built for his transit residence whenever he was at Delhi. Dholpur House is located on Shahjahan Road, near India Gate. It was built in the Art Deco style. The exterior walls of Dholpur House are painted white.

Today, the building serves as the headquarters of the Union Public Service Commission. The UPSC conducts interviews at Dholpur House to recruit candidates for the All India Services and Group A services for the Government of India.

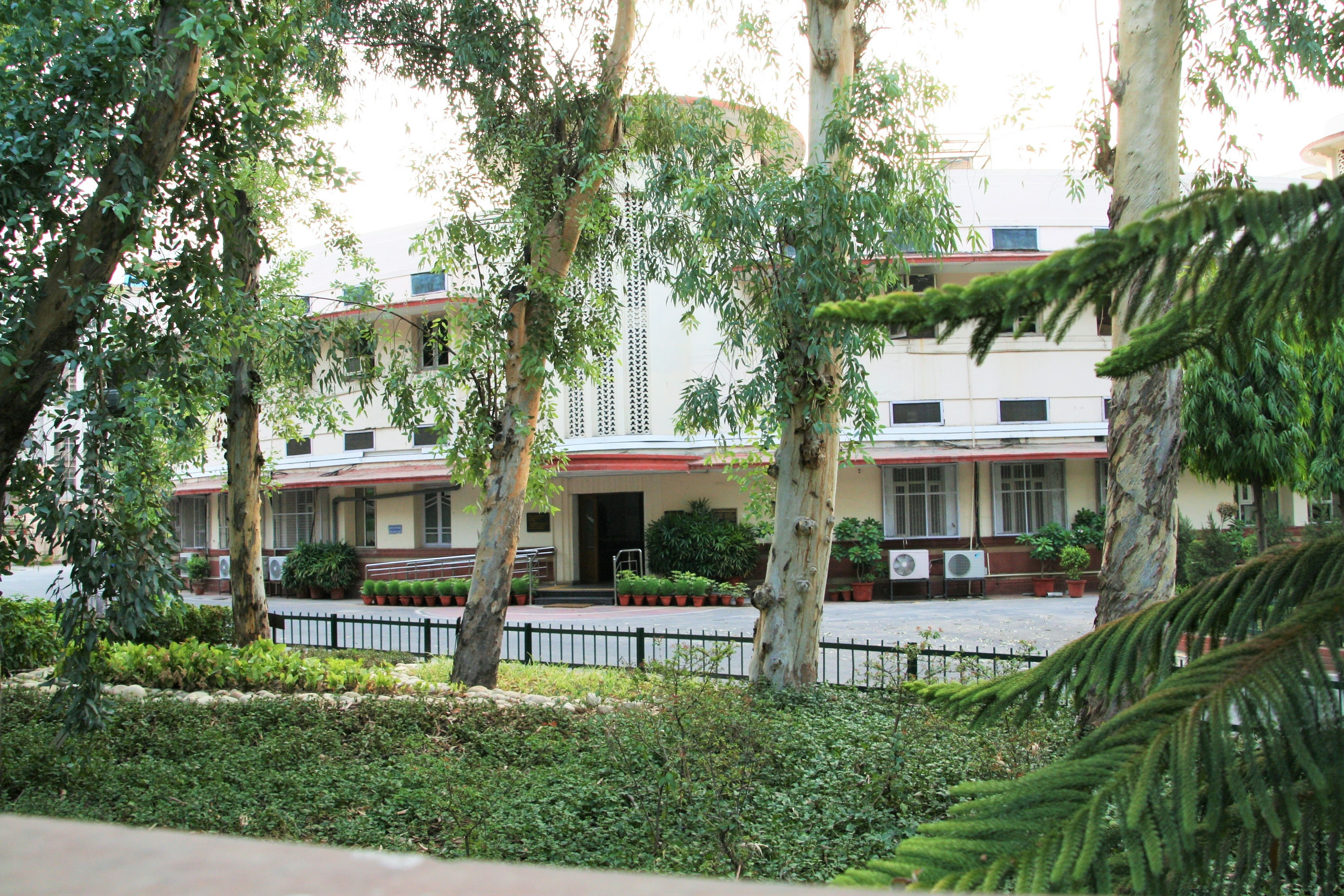
Dholpur House

A Museum is also located within the premises of the UPSC, the Dholpur House, Shahjahan Road, New Delhi.

== History ==
After India's independence, on April 7, 1949, Maharaja Rana Udaybhanu Singh acceded Dholpur State into the Union of India. Dholpur was merged with three neighboring states to form the Matsya Union within the Union of India of which he was made Rajpramukh. Later, the present day state of Rajasthan was created by merging Matsya and several other unions. In 1949 with the merger of Dholpur State with the Union of India, Dholpur House became part of Indian Government's property. In 1952, the office of UPSC was shifted to Dholpur House.

== See also ==
- Baroda House
- Bikaner House
- Hyderabad House
- Jaipur House
- Jodhpur House
- Patiala House
