= Courts in Delhi =

Courts in the National Capital Territory (NCT) of Delhi include:

- Supreme Court of India
- High Court of Delhi
- 7 district courts of Delhi
- Various other tribunals

== Supreme Court ==
The Supreme Court of India is the supreme judicial authority and highest court of India. It located between Tilak Marg and Delhi-Mathura road (NH-2) in New Delhi.

== High Court ==
The High Court of Delhi, established in 1966, is the highest court of Delhi. It is located on the Sher Shah road near India Gate in New Delhi.

== District Courts ==
- District courts of Delhi: There are seven district-level court complexes for the 11 administrative districts of Delhi. These seven courts house eleven district courts, which are headed by individual district judges.

| S.No. | Name of Court | Districts | Year of Establishment | Number of Courts |
|---|---|---|---|---|
| 1 | Tis Hazari Court (Tis Hazari) | Central & West Delhi | 1958 | 14 courts (11 MM + 3 CJ) |
| 2 | Patiala House Court (India Gate) | New Delhi | 1977 | 7 courts (7 MM) |
| 3 | Karkardooma Court (Anand Vihar) | East, North-East & Shahdara | 1993 | 6 courts (6 MM) |
| 4 | Rohini Court (Rohini) | North-West & North Delhi | 2005 | 2 courts (2 MM) |
| 5 | Dwarka Court (Dwarka) | South-West Delhi | 2008 | 3 courts (3 MM) |
| 6 | Saket Court (Pushp Vihar) | South & South-East Delhi | 2010 | 6 courts (5 MM + 1 CJ) |
| 7 | Rouse Avenue Court (ITO, Delhi) | Central & West Delhi | 2019 | |

== Tribunals ==
Apart from the above courts, there are various tribunals in Delhi. These institutions have been established for discharging judicial or quasi-judicial duties in order to reduce the case load of the judiciary, and bring subject expertise for technical matters.

1. Appellate Tribunal for Electricity
2. Central Administrative Tribunal
3. Customs, Excise and Service Tax Appellate Tribunal
4. Cyber Appellate Tribunal
5. Debt Recovery Tribunal
6. Income Tax Appellate Tribunal
7. National Company Law Tribunal
8. National Green Tribunal
9. Railway Claims Tribunal
