= Jamnagar House =

Coordinates: 28.610405°N 77.228211°E

Jamnagar House is the former residence of the Jam Sahib of Nawanagar State in Delhi. The office of the Deputy Commissioner of New Delhi district is located at Jamnagar House, Shahjahan Road in New Delhi.

Central Wakf Council has its office in this building as well.

== See also ==
- Hyderabad House
- Bikaner House
- Baroda House
- Jaipur House
- Patiala House
