= Udaipur House =

General information
- Type: Royal residence
- Architectural style: Indo-Saracenic Revival architecture
- Location: New Delhi, India
- Current tenants: Ministry of External Affairs
- Construction started: 1920s
- Completed: Late 1920s
- Owner: Government of India

Design and construction
- Known for: Former residence of the Mewar royal family

The Udaipur House is a historic royal residence located in New Delhi, India. It formerly served as the city residence of the Maharanas of Udaipur and is one of the few remaining examples of the architectural presence of princely states in India's capital.

== Early history ==
During the early 20th century, when New Delhi was being developed as the imperial capital of British India, several princely states established residences in the city to maintain political and ceremonial presence. These buildings, known as state houses, served as residences and diplomatic hubs for the rulers. Udaipur House was constructed for the Maharanas of Mewar for this purpose.

== Architecture ==
Udaipur House was built in the Indo-Saracenic style, incorporating a blend of Mughal and European architectural elements, typical of state houses in Lutyens' Delhi. Although smaller than Hyderabad House or Jaipur House, it contains notable features such as a central hall, landscaped lawns, and elements resembling traditional Rajasthani architecture.

== Post-Independence use ==
Following India's independence in 1947 and the integration of princely states, Udaipur House was transferred to the Government of Rajasthan. Subsequently, it was rented out to the Government of Delhi, which used the residence to run its Labour Department's office.

== Current status ==
In 2014, the Government of Rajasthan filed a case in the Supreme Court of India to take possession of Udaipur House. In 2016, they sent a fresh reminder to the Government of Delhi; however, they were instead offered land in different parts of Delhi.

In 2019, the residence was finally handed over to the Rajasthan government. The state planned to use it as a cultural centre and guest house for official purposes.

== Heritage status and conservation ==
Udaipur House has been identified by conservation groups such as the Indian National Trust for Art and Cultural Heritage (INTACH) as part of Delhi's modern heritage. INTACH has included the structure in surveys aimed at protecting historically significant but relatively recent buildings.

== Legacy of Mewar ==
The Udaipur royal family, known for its long-standing rule over the region of Mewar in Rajasthan, continues to reside at the City Palace, Udaipur.

== See also ==
- Hyderabad House
- Jaipur House
- Bikaner House
- City Palace, Udaipur
- Lutyens' Delhi
- Baroda House
- Patiala House
