= Beema Nagar =

Coordinates: 10.808736°N 78.690452°E

Beema Nagar (Tamil: பீம நகர்) is an area of the city of Tiruchirapalli in the Indian state of Tamil Nadu. The district court and district registrar office are located within the neighborhood.
