= Shahjahan Road =

Road in New Delhi, India

Coordinates: 28.606527°N 77.227385°E

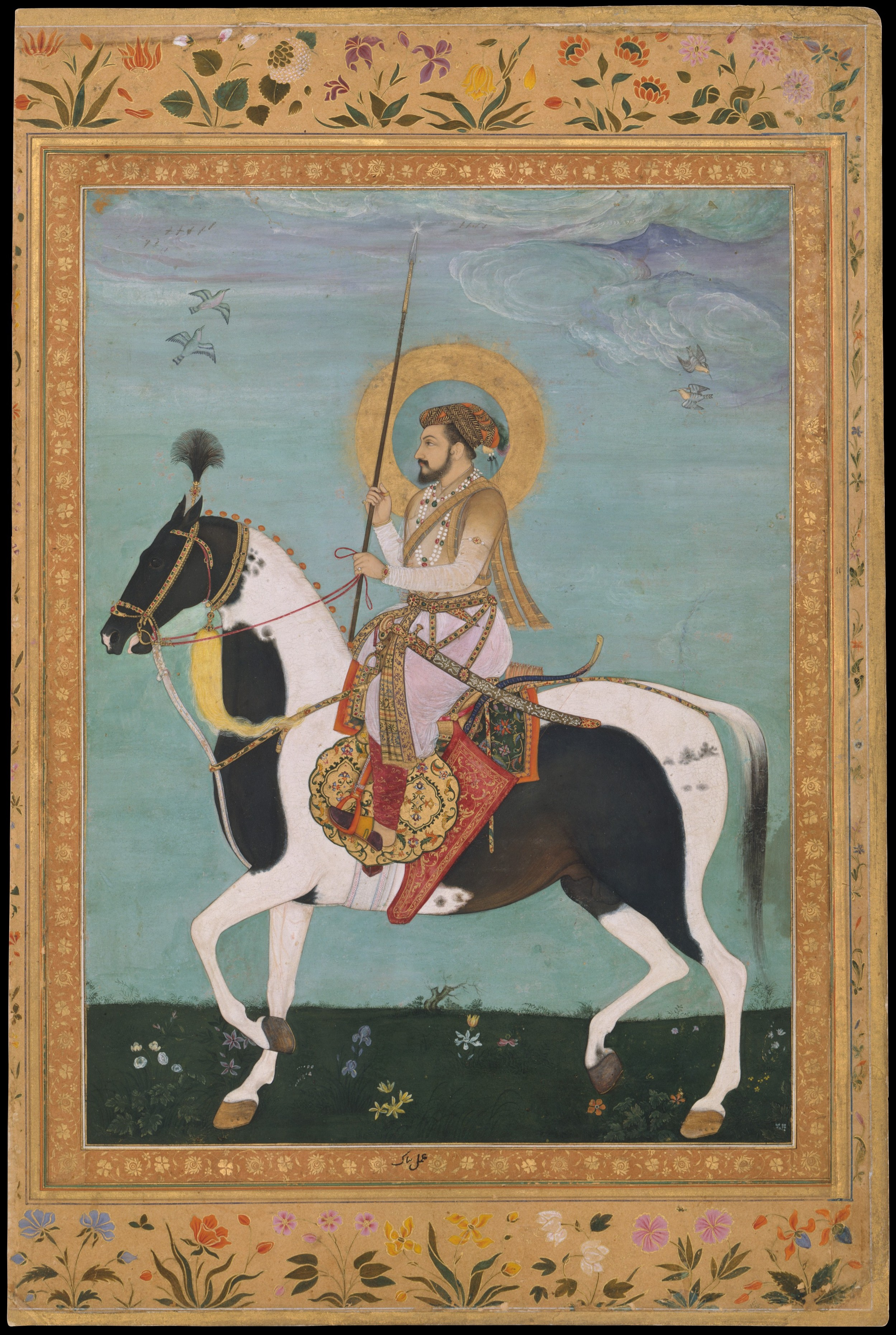
Emperor Shah Jahan

Shahjahan Road (Hindi: शाहजहाँ मार्ग / रोड) is an important road of central New Delhi, India. It stretches from the India Gate junction on the north side and to the Taj Mansingh Hotel at the junction of Mansingh Road, Aurangzeb road Humayun Road, Prithviraj Road and a road to Khan Market on the south. Also lined up on the Shahjahan Road are government houses for High Court Judges, Ministers and senior officials & bureaucrats in the Government of India.

It is named after the Mughal Emperor of India, Shah Jahan.

== Important places ==
It houses the famous UPSC or Union Public Service Commission headquarters at Dholpur House. Also the Army officers Mess and the Kota House. In the nearby Jamnagar House is the headquarters of Central Wakf Council.
