= Jodhpur House =

Indian Maharaja's residence, 1930s-1950s

Coordinates: 28.598918°N 77.215125°E

Jodhpur House is the former residence of the Maharaja of Jodhpur in Delhi. Jodhpur House was commissioned in the mid‑1930s by Maharaja Hanwant Singh of Jodhpur as his official New Delhi residence and completed in 1938 as part of the princely state enclave in Lutyens Bungalow Zone. After India’s independence, the Government of India acquired the property and, since the 1950s, it has served the Ministry of defence as offices and a guest house for visiting dignitaries.

== History ==
The Jodhpur House was commissioned in the mid‑1930s by Maharaja Hanwant Singh of Jodhpur as his official residence in New Delhi’s Lutyens’ Bungalow Zone and was completed in 1938. It forms a part of the cluster of princely state homes built alongside Hyderabad, Baroda, Bikaner and Jaipur Houses. After India’s independence, the Government of India acquired the property and, since the 1950s, it has been occupied by the Ministry of defence, serving as office space and a guest house for visiting dignitaries.

== Architecture ==
Jodhpur House was designed in the Neo‑Classical vernacular favored by Sir Edwin Lutyens. It is a two‑storey pavilion constructed in alternating bands of red and buff sandstone. Its symmetrical façade is anchored by a central portico supported on Tuscan columns and flanked by evenly spaced sash windows beneath overhanging eaves (chhajjas). The building’s plan in Lutyens Delhi follows same design, they organizes principal reception rooms around an internal courtyard, with high‑ceilinged halls opening onto verandahs overlooking formal gardens to the rear. Detailing such as shallow cornices, pedimented window surrounds and restrained molded panels recall classical motifs, while subtle jaali grilles above the entrance admit filtered light and ventilation, marrying monumentality with the subtropical climate’s practical needs.

== See also ==
- Hyderabad House
- Bikaner House
- Baroda House
- Jaipur House
- Patiala House
