= Rouse Avenue Courts Complex =

Building complex for special district courts in New Delhi

- Interactive map of the Rouse Avenue Courts Complex area

General information
- Type: Court complex
- Location: DDU Marg, New Delhi, India
- Coordinates: 28.6320°N 77.2344°E
- Inaugurated: 8 April 2019

Design and construction
- Architect: Goonmeet Singh Chauhan

Rouse Avenue District Court, also known as Rouse Avenue Courts Complex, is a court complex in New Delhi, India, housing several special district courts subordinate to the Delhi High Court. It primarily hears cases involving corruption, economic offenses, crimes of lawmakers (MPs/MLAs), organised crimes, terrorism, drug-related crimes, labour disputes, and offences related to public examinations.

The Central Delhi Court Bar Association (CDCBA), the official bar association of the complex, describes the Rouse Avenue Courts Complex as "a hub for high-profile cases, handling matters of exceptional significance".

== History ==
The building, named Rouse Avenue District Court, was established on 8 April 2019 in DDU Marg, New Delhi. This eight storeyed earthquake-resistant building housed 42 courtrooms (at that time) and a basement with parking facility for 800 vehicles. It received a four-star rating in green certification. The complex was inaugurated by the then chief justice of the Delhi High Court, Rajendra Menon. The building was designed by architect Goonmeet Singh Chauhan.

Then additional sessions judge (ASJ) and special judge O. P. Saini was appointed as the first judge in-charge of the court complex. The initially assigned cases were Prevention of Corruption Act, 1988 investigated by the Central Bureau of Investigation (CBI) and the labour/industrial matters of NCT Delhi.

== Special courts ==
Before its major expansion in 2026, the Rouse Avenue Courts Complex primarily heard cases involving incumbent and former Members of Parliament (MPs) and Members of the Legislative Assemblies (MLAs), as well as corruption and economic offences investigated by the CBI and the Enforcement Directorate (ED). The building also houses labour courts. In 2026, 16 new courtrooms were constructed. In July, the Ministry of Home Affairs issued a notification transferring courts trying offences investigated by the National Investigation Agency (NIA) from the Patiala House Courts Complex to three newly designated "special exclusive courts" in the Rouse Avenue Courts Complex.

In August 2026, 14 additional "special exclusive courts" were inaugurated. These comprised six courts for cases under the National Investigation Agency Act (NIA Act) and the Unlawful Activities (Prevention) Act (UAPA), three courts for cases under the Maharashtra Control of Organized Crime Act (MCOC Act), four courts for cases under the Narcotic Drugs and Psychotropic Substances Act (NDPS Act), and one specially designated "fast track court" for offences under the Public Examinations (Prevention of Unfair Means) Act and related offences. During the inauguration, Chief Justice of India Surya Kant stated that "special exclusive courts" were intended to "enable judges to develop subject-matter expertise, ensure uninterrupted hearings, and encourage more effective case management".

== Awards ==
In July 2019, the Central Public Works Department (CPWD) awarded the building second prize in the "Best Completed Projects (Office)" category.

== See also ==
- Courts in Delhi
- Subordinate courts of Delhi High Court
