= Subordinate courts of Delhi High Court =

The National Capital Territory of Delhi has seven district courts that function under the Delhi High Court:

- Tis Hazari Courts Complex, established 1958, located in Tis Hazari
- Patiala House Courts Complex, established 1977, located near India Gate, New Delhi
- Karkardooma Courts Complex, established 1993, located near Anand Vihar
- Rohini Courts Complex, established 2005, located in Rohini
- Dwarka Courts Complex, established 2008, located in Sector 10, Dwarka
- Saket Courts Complex, established 2010, located in Saket District Centre, Pushp Vihar
- Rouse Avenue Courts Complex, established 2019, located near ITO

The above are seven physical locations of the district courts, whereas actually there are eleven district courts headed by individual district judges. The Tis Hazari complex, Rohini complex and Saket complex host two districts each, the Karkardooma complex hosts three districts, and the remaining complexes host one district court each.
