= Patiala House Courts Complex =

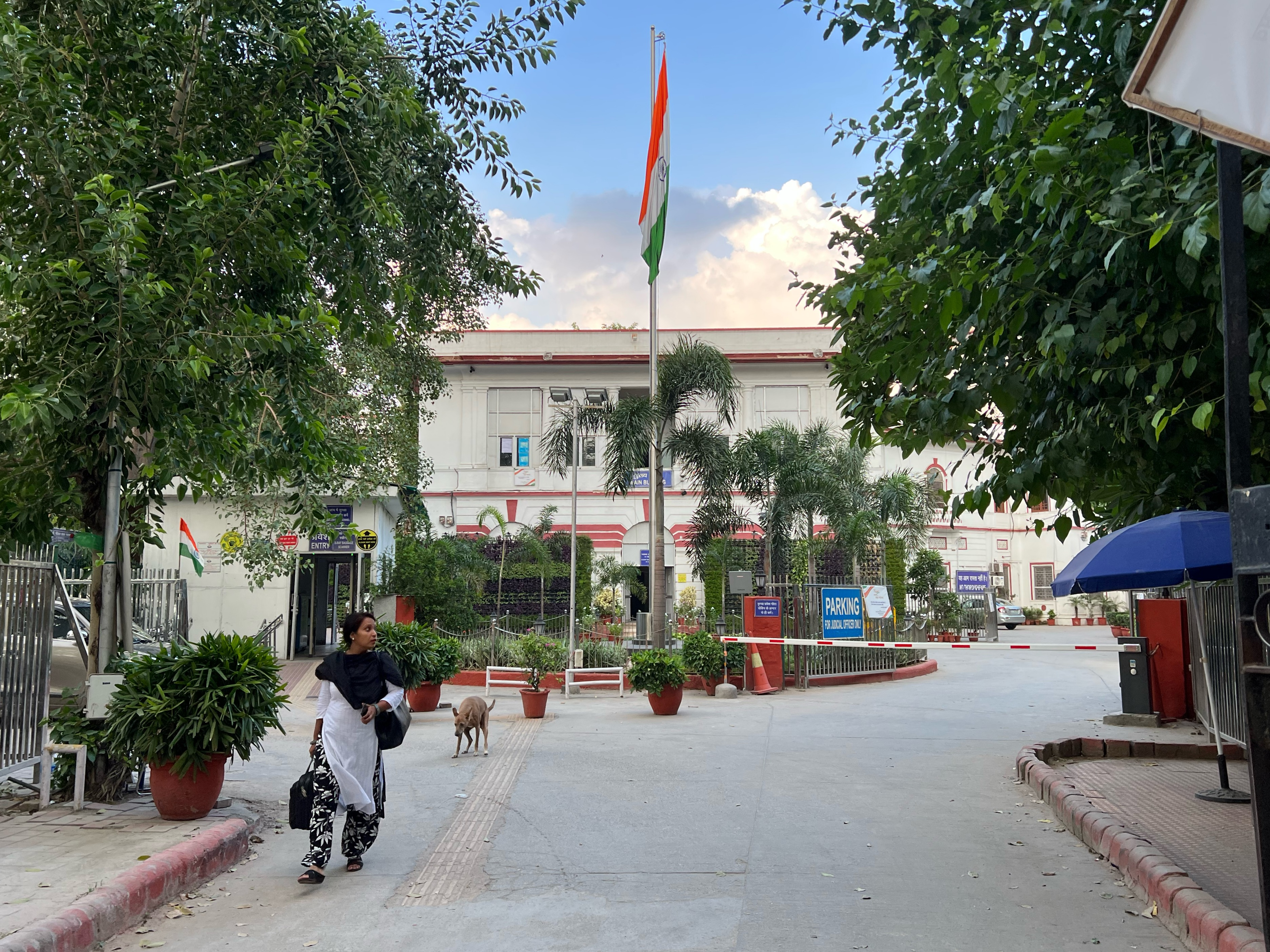
- Patiala House Courts Entrance
- Interactive map of the Patiala House Courts Complex area

General information
- Status: Completed
- Type: District courts
- Location: New Delhi, India
- Coordinates: 28.6155°N 77.2348°E
- Groundbreaking: 2004
- Construction started: 2004
- Completed: 2007
- Inaugurated: 2007

Technical details
- Floor count: 5

Patiala House Courts Complex is one of the seven District Courts complexes located near India Gate in the National Capital Territory of Delhi (NCT of Delhi).

Patiala House served as the residence of the Maharaja of Patiala before it was later sold to the Government of India.

The complex is situated near India Gate in central Delhi, India. The Patiala House Court Complex is built in an area measuring 31,872 square metres. The whole complex is divided into five parts: Main Building, Publication Building, Annexe Building, Lock-up Building & MEA Building. The complex consists of 32 Courts, 1 Family Court, Delhi Legal Services Authorities Office and various other branches and Lawyers Chambers.

== History ==
When Prime Minister Indira Gandhi abolished the privy purses of in the 1970s, the former royal family sold the structure to the Indian government. The Delhi High Court was run from here earlier and from 1978, it is the District court. As the population of Delhi grew, in March 1997 Patiala House was converted to become one of three court complexes in the city, after criminal courts from Parliament Street were shifted here.

In 2001, 54 judges were stationed at Patiala House Courts, which have jurisdiction over the New Delhi, South Delhi and South West Delhi districts.

== Library ==
A Library is functional for Judicial Officers at ground floor of the publication building. Judicial Officers can access all the reference books, journals, bar acts, general books, law journals, law software etc. Binding of law journals, purchasing of newspapers and magazines for the Ld. District Judge, New Delhi District.
