= Railway Claims Tribunal =

Agency overview
- Jurisdiction: Indian Railways
- Headquarters: India
- Parent agency: Ministry of Law and Justice, Department of Legal Affairs
- Website: rct.indianrail.gov.in

Railway Claims Tribunal is a quasi judicial body formed to determine losses against Indian Railways in case of any natural or unnatural events causings losses to the passenger or freight handled by railways.

== History and objective ==
Railway Claims Tribunal had been formed to calculate damages or losses against Railway Administration in the event of railway accidents and other natural and unnatural events.

== Composition ==
Railway Claims Tribunal is headed by chairman. Railway Claims Tribunal comprises two members, one each from Technical and Judicial. Technical member is a retired official of Indian Railways and Judicial member will be from legal background but outside railway services.

Justice (Retd) Kannan, is the chairman of Railways Claims Tribunal. He will serve for a period of five years or on attaining 65 years whichever is earlier.

== Location ==
Railway Claims Tribunal is located across India.

- Chandigarh
- Delhi (India get)
- Jaipur
- Lucknow
- Gorakhpur
- Allahabad
- Patna
- Guwahati
- Ahmedabad
- Bhopal
- Ranchi
- Kolkata
- Mumbai
- Nagpur
- Bhubaneswar
- Secunderabad
- Amravati
- Bengaluru
- Chennai
- Ernakulum

== Challenges ==
- Delay in appointment of staff.

== See also ==
- Indian Railways
