= Patiala House =

Former residence of the Maharaja of Patiala in Delhi, India

Coordinates: 28.615341°N 77.234737°E

Patiala House is the former residence of the Maharaja of Patiala in Delhi, designed by Edwin Lutyens. It is situated near India Gate in New Delhi, India.

== History ==
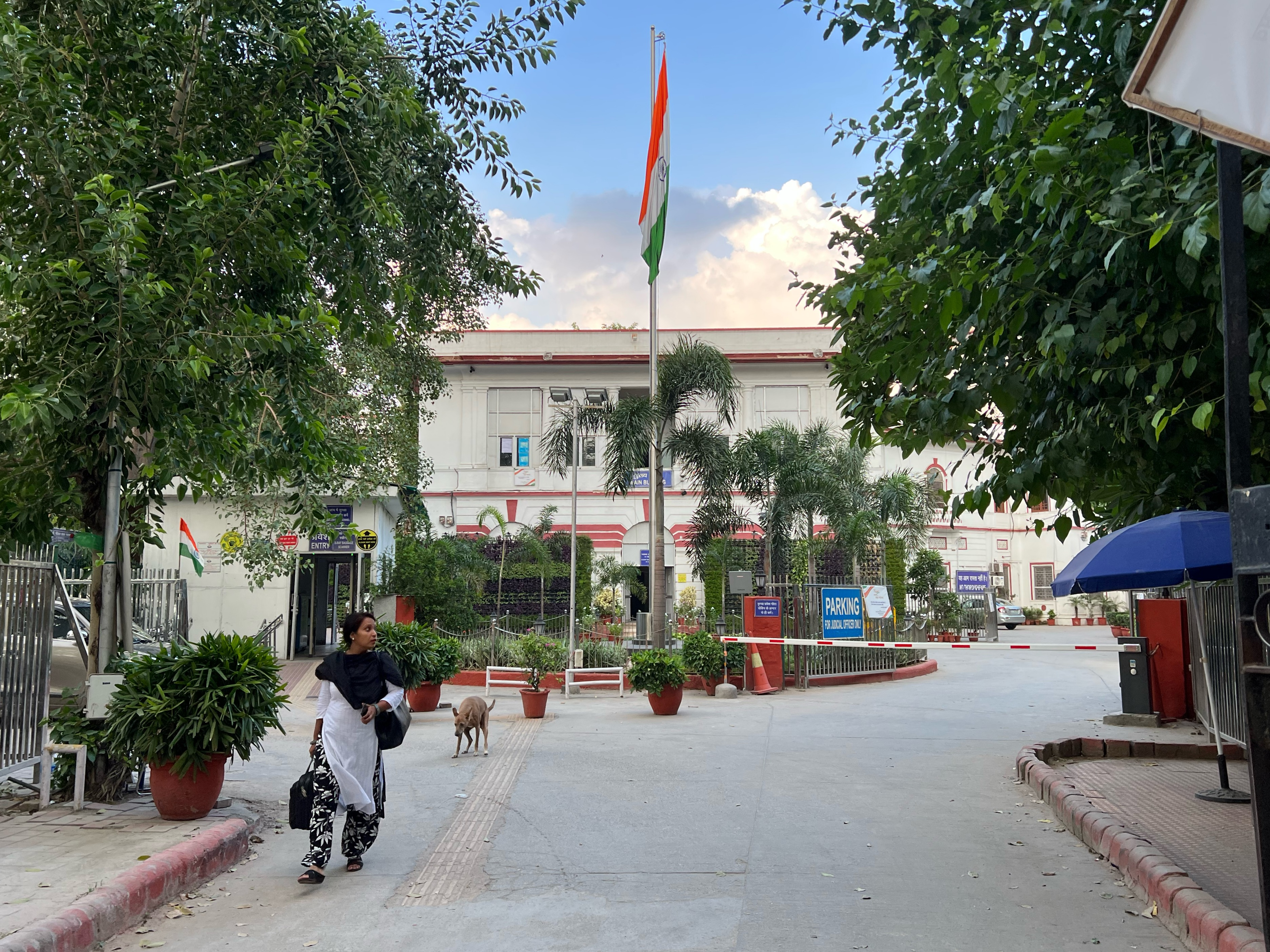
Patiala House Courts

It was designed by Edwin Lutyens. Patiala House was completed by Yadavindra Singh, the last Maharaja of Patiala. The building has a central dome with a "butterfly" layout, similar to other Lutyens’ buildings. The Patiala House building is white. During World War II, Patiala House was used as a war room by the British for their war effort, and later, the property was used as a regional office for the World Health Organization.

In 1958, the Indian government purchased a part of Patiala House. When Prime Minister Indira Gandhi abolished the privy purses of the royals in the 1970s, the Indian government took over the property. The property has been used by the District Courts of Delhi and is known as the Patiala House Courts Complex.

== See also ==
- Hyderabad House
- Bikaner House
- Baroda House
- Jaipur House
- Jodhpur House
- Udaipur House
