= Kota House =

Building in New Delhi, India

Coordinates: 28.6060°N 77.2255°E

Kota House with Indian Navy personnel, 2017

Kota House is the former residence of the Maharao of Kota in New Delhi, India. It is located on Shahjahan Road. It has been used as a wartime military hospital and a military hostel. It is now a Indian Navy officers' mess and hotel facility.

== History ==
Navy Day press conference by Chief of the Naval Staff, Admiral R K Dhowan at Kota House, New Delhi, 2015

The Kota House was built in 1938 under Maharao Umed Singh II. It was designed in an art-deco style by architects from Sattha Buta & Co., a firm from Bombay.

The British Government in India acquired Kota House during the Second World War, converting it into a hospital for American servicemen and women stationed in India. At the end of the war, the government returned the building to the state of Kota. After the merger of the princely states with India in 1948, Kota House became the property of the State of Rajputana.

In 1961, the Indian Ministry of Works, Housing and Development purchased Kota House for Rs 12,77,700/-. In November 1962, the Indian Ministry of Defence acquired Kota House and converted it into an Indian Armed Forces Hostel.

In October 1983, Kota House was transferred to the Indian Navy. The Navy converted it into the first officers' mess in New Delhi, Naval Officers' Mess Annexe (NOMA).

== Current operations ==
Today, Kota House is run by an Indian naval officer. It is operated by both sailors and civilians. The facilities are only available to members of Kota House. However, any Naval Officer can stay there for nominal charges.

Kota House is surrounded by lawns and flower beds. Civilian/guests of officers are also permitted to use facilities at Kota House.
