= Hyderabad House =

Building in New Delhi, India

Coordinates: 28.616141°N 77.227948°E

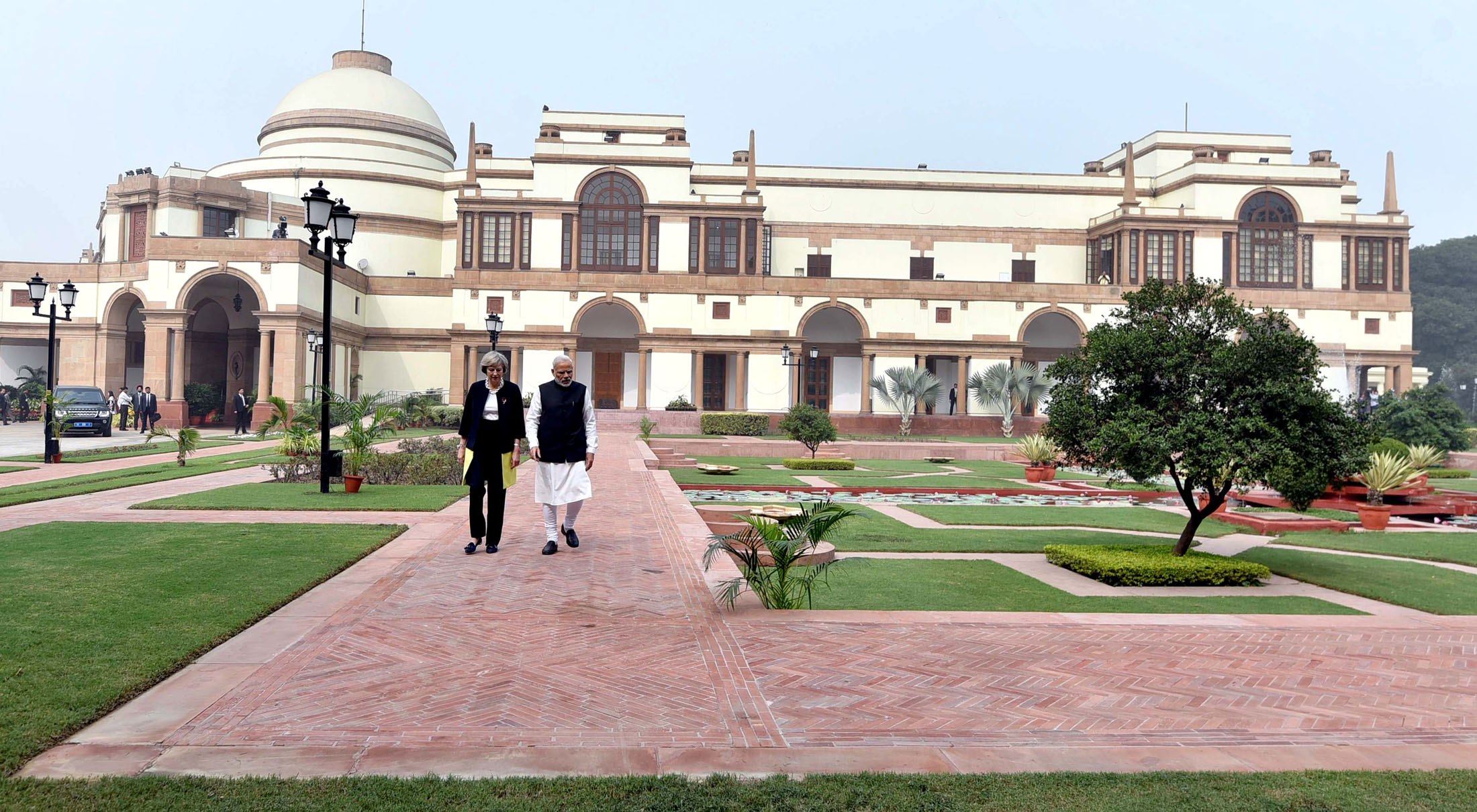
- Prime Minister Narendra Modi and British Prime Minister Theresa May at the Hyderabad House (2016)
- Interactive map of the Hyderabad House area

General information
- Construction started: 1926; 100 years ago
- Completed: 1928; 98 years ago
- Cost: £200,000 (equivalent to £15 million in 2024)
- Owner: Government of India

Technical details
- Floor area: 8.77 acres (3.55 ha)
- Lifts/elevators: 0

Design and construction
- Architect: Sir Edwin Lutyens

Other information
- Number of rooms: 36

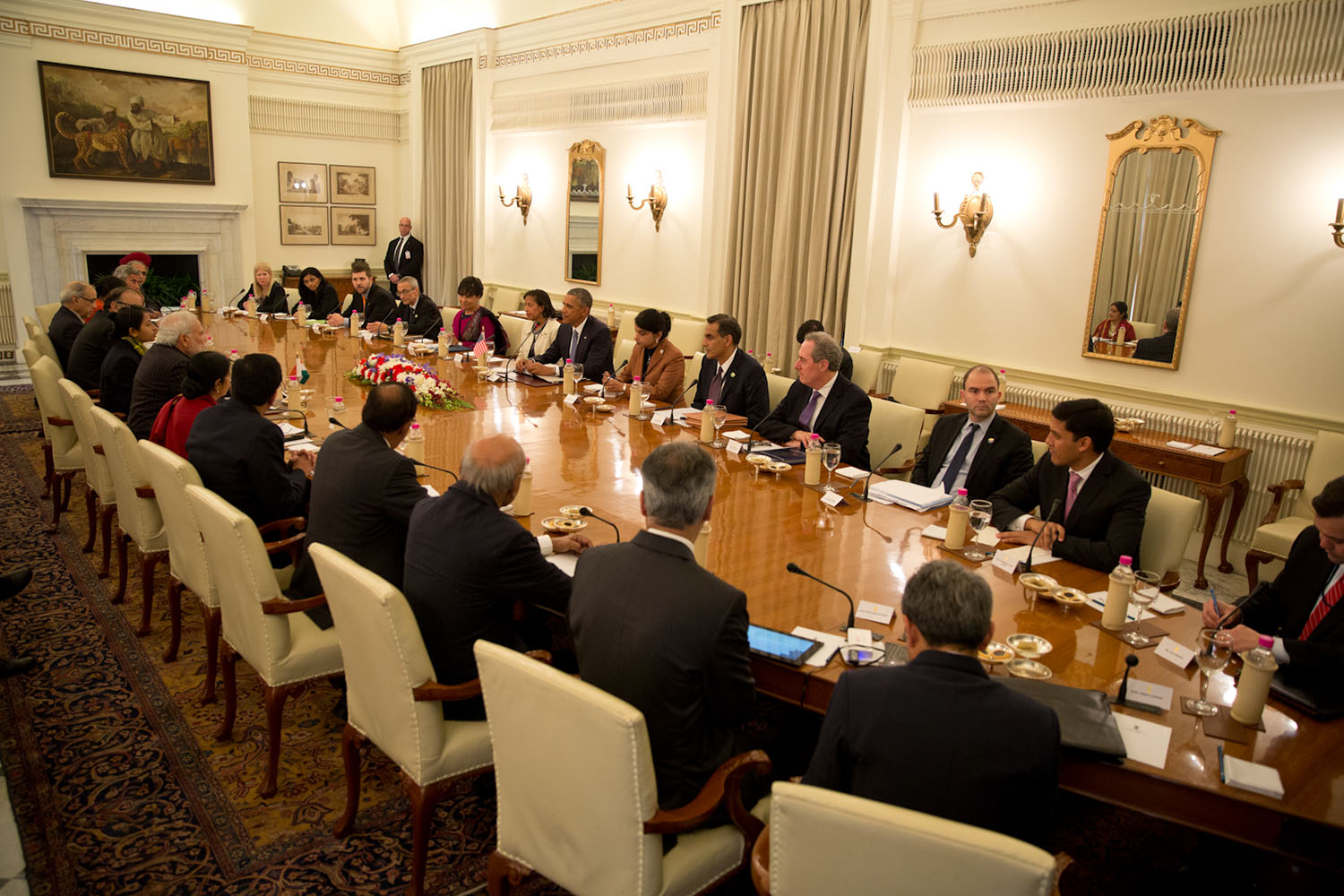
Prime Minister Narendra Modi and U.S. President Barack Obama in a meeting in Hyderabad House (2015)

Hyderabad House is an official residence in New Delhi, India. It is the State Guest House of the Prime Minister of India. It is used by the Government of India for banquets, and as a venue for meetings with visiting foreign dignitaries. It was designed by British architect Sir Edwin Lutyens as a residence for Mir Osman Ali Khan, the last Nizam of Hyderabad.

== History ==
Hyderabad House was built for Mir Osman Ali Khan, the last ruling Nizam of Hyderabad. It is situated next to the Baroda House, the erstwhile royal residence of the Maharaja of Baroda and currently the zonal headquarters office of Northern Railways.

After Indian independence in 1947, the palace was occasionally used by the Nizam. Since 1974, Hyderabad House has been under the jurisdiction of the Ministry of External Affairs, and is used for state visits, banquets and meetings for visiting foreign dignitaries. It has also been a venue for joint press conferences and major government events.

== Architecture ==
Hyderabad House is spread over 8.2 acres and built in the shape of a butterfly. The entrance hall of the palace, a dome with an entrance hall beneath with symmetrical wings at fifty-five degree angle, is one of the features. The building has 36 rooms, which includes four for the zenana. Hyderabad House is located near the India Gate.

With the exception of the Viceroy's House, it was the largest and grandest of all the royal palaces built in Delhi by Edwin Lutyens during 1921–1931. The Nizam’s sons disliked the building, finding it too western in style for their tastes and was seldom used by them.

== Gallery ==
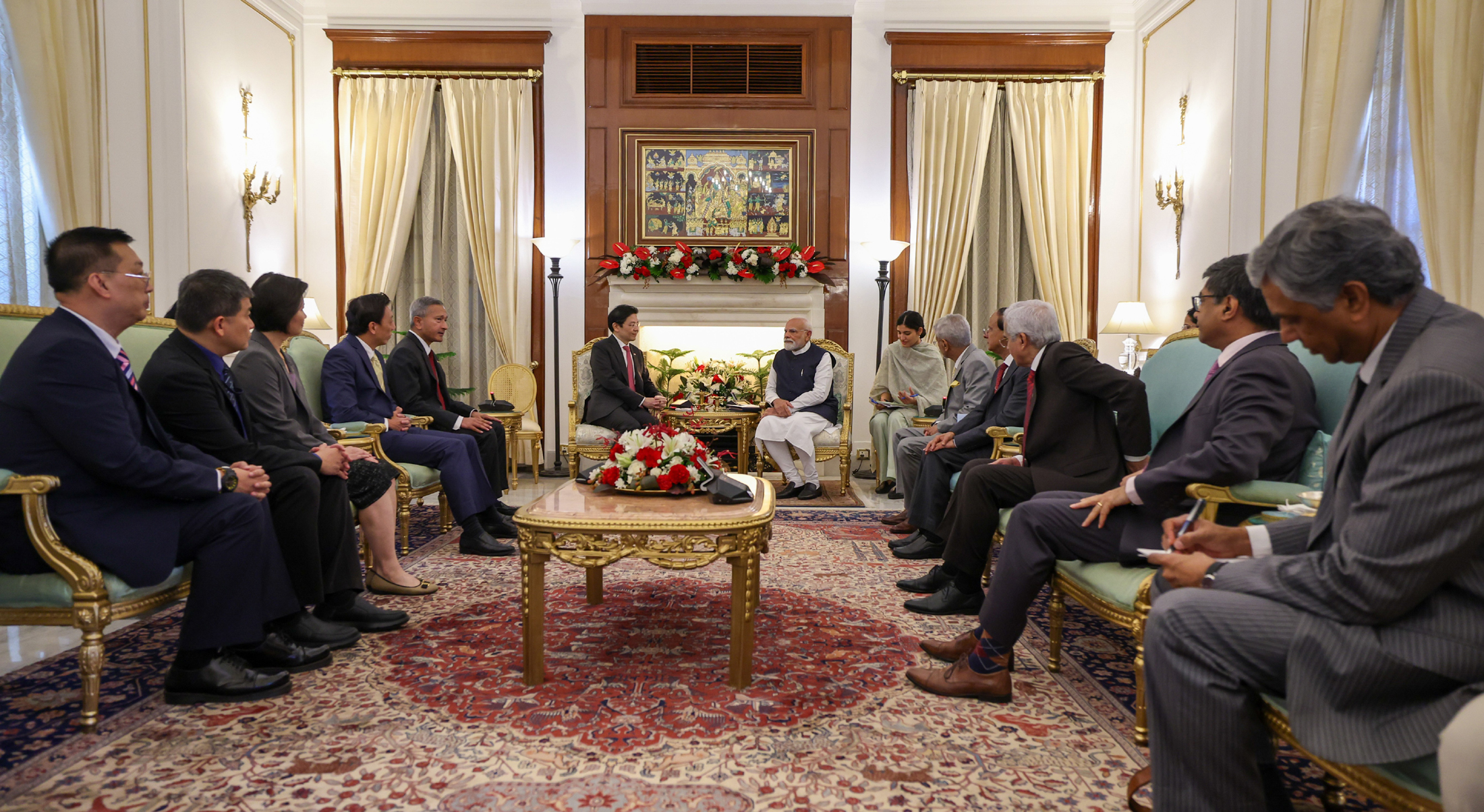
PM Modi with PM Lawrence Wong (2025)

== See also ==
- List of official residences of India
- Jodhpur House
- Jaipur House
- Bikaner House
- Baroda House
- Patiala House
- Dholpur House
