= Jaipur House =

Building in New Delhi, India

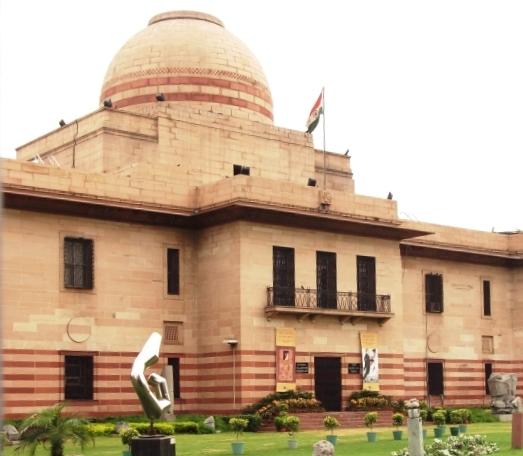
- Central Wing of Jaipur House
- Interactive map of the Jaipur House area

General information
- Location: New Delhi, India
- Coordinates: 28.610083°N 77.234399°E
- Current tenants: National Gallery of Modern Art

Design and construction
- Architect: Arthur Blomfield

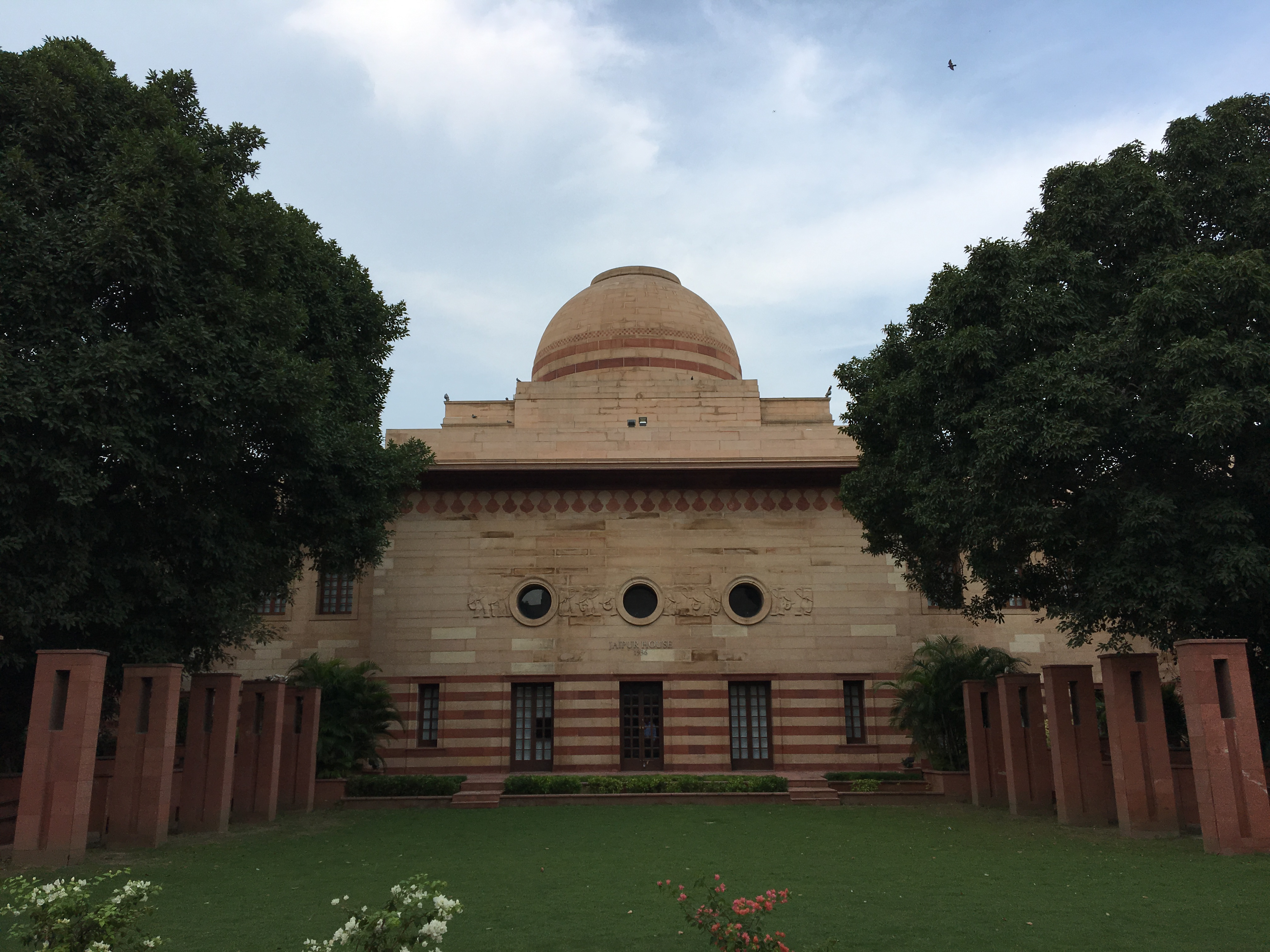
Backside of Jaipur House with carved art deco friezes

Jaipur House is the former residence of the Maharaja of Jaipur in the city of New Delhi, India. It is situated at the end of Rajpath, facing the India Gate. Jaipur House was commissioned in 1936 by Maharaja Man Singh II as his residence in Lutyens’ Delhi and completed in 1938 to a design by Arthur Blomfield and Francis Blomfield. Its butterfly‑plan layout features twin wings radiating from a domed central pavilion clad in red and buff Dholpur sandstone, punctuated by Rajput columns, Mughal motifs and a saucer‑shaped dome. In 1954, the building was repurposed as the National Gallery of Modern Art, India's premier public institution for modern and contemporary art.

== History ==
The Jaipur House was commissioned in 1936 by Maharaja Man Singh II of Jaipur as his New Delhi residence during the British Raj. It was one of several princely palaces lining the then new imperial capital's central vista (Lutyens' Delhi). The building was designed by Arthur Blomfield and his brother Francis in 1936, construction was completed in 1938, shortly before the Second World War. After Indian independence, the Government of India repurposed it as the National Gallery of Modern Art in 1954, inaugurating the country's premier public modern‑art museum within its halls.

== Architecture ==
The Jaipur House is articulated in a distinctive butterfly‑plan, with two symmetrical wings radiating from a central domed pavilion to enclose a forecourt and mirror each other toward the rear garden. The façades rise from a rusticated base of alternating bands of red and buff Dholpur sandstone, shifting to a lighter buff stone on the upper storey, and are capped by a continuous deep sun‑shade (chajja) in red stone that emphasizes horizontal monumentality. Vertical slit‑windows punctuate the otherwise austere walls, while carved Rajput‑style columns frame arched openings and subtle ornamental bands recall Mughal lattice motifs. Atop the central block sits a saucer‑shaped dome echoing Lutyens's design for the nearby Rashtrapati Bhavan and decorated with chhatri pavilions and Mughal‑inspired patterns that shelters the triple‑height main hall.

Inside, twin curved staircases rise from the lobby to the first‑floor galleries, whose labyrinthine corridors joined at obtuse angles at house exhibition spaces beneath tall, coffered ceilings with minimal natural light. Original terrazzo floors and wood‑panelled galleries convey the palace's former function as a grand reception venue, even as modern extensions behind the wings replicate its sandstone banding and colonnaded screens to integrate new galleries with the 1938 structure.

== See also ==
- Hyderabad House
- Bikaner House
- Baroda House
- Patiala House
- Jodhpur House
