= District courts of India =

Judicial wing of India

- Interactive map of District courts of India
- 17.912°N 77.520°E
- Jurisdiction: Respective Districts of States and Union Territories of India
- Location: 800 districts
- Coordinates: 17.912°N 77.520°E
- Motto: Satyamev Jayate
- Authorised by: Constitution of India
- Appeals to: Respective High Courts
- Appeals from: Tehsil (Taluka) court
- Judge term length: 60 years
- Language: English; Hindi; Respective State and Union Territory Regional Language

District Judges
- Currently: Respective Districts Judges

The district courts of India are the district courts of the state governments in India for every district or for one or more districts together taking into account of the number of cases, population distribution in the district. They administer justice in India at a district level.

The civil court/district court is judged by the district and sessions judge who is the judicial head of a district with a limited control over administration also. It is the principal court of original civil jurisdiction besides the high court of the state and which derives its jurisdiction in civil matters primarily from the Code of Civil Procedure. The district court is also a court of sessions when it exercises its jurisdiction on criminal matters under the Bharatiya Nagarik Suraksha Sanhita. The district court is presided over by a district judge appointed by the governor of the state with on the advice of chief justice of that high court. In addition to the district judge there may be a number of additional district judges and assistant district judges depending on the workload. The additional district judge and the court presided have equivalent jurisdiction as the district judge and their district court.

However, the district judge has supervisory control over additional and assistant district judges, including decisions on the allocation of work among them. The district and sessions judge is often referred to as "district judge" when presiding over civil matters and "sessions judge" when presiding over criminal matters. Being the highest judge at district level, the district judge also enjoys the power to manage the state funds allocated for the development of judiciary in the district.

The district judge is also called "metropolitan session judge" when presiding over a district court in a city which is designated "metropolitan area" by the state. Other courts subordinated to district court in the metropolitan area are also referred to with "metropolitan" prefixed to the usual designation. An area is designated a metropolitan area by the concerned state government if population of the area exceeds one million

== Judiciary Structure under Districts and Metropolitan Area ==
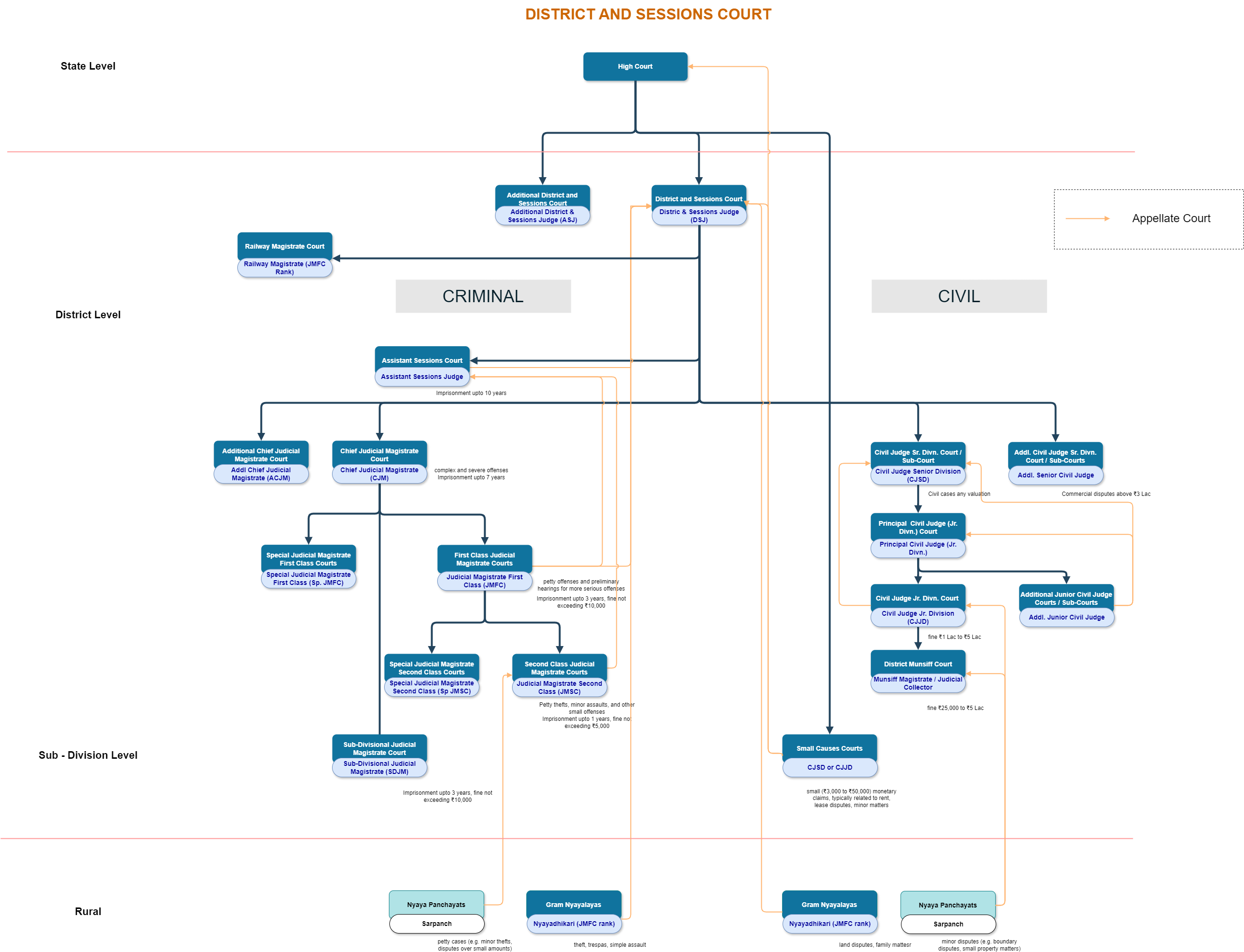

== Appointment and removal ==
The judges of subordinate courts are appointed by the governor in consultation with the chief justice of the high court of the concerned state. A minimum of seven years of practice as a lawyer at bar is a necessary qualification for direct entry level to become a district judge upon a written examination and oral interview by a committee of high court judges, the appointment of district judges is notified by the state government. This is referred to as direct recruitment which is also known as Higher Judicial Service. District judges are also appointed by way promotion (from Civil Service - Judicial) from district courts after fulfilling minimum years of service.

The next level of ascendancy for a district judge who served sufficient number of years is the post of high court judge. High court judges are usually appointed from a pool of advocates practicing at the bar of the high court and district judges who served for sufficient number of years.

A district judge or additional district judge may be removed from his office by the governor on confirmation from the high court collegium.

== Jurisdiction ==
The district court exercises jurisdiction both on original side and appellate side in civil and criminal matters arising in the district. The territorial and pecuniary jurisdiction in civil matters is usually set in concerned state enactments on the subject of civil courts. On the criminal side, jurisdiction is exclusively derived from the criminal procedure code. As per this code the maximum sentence a sessions judge of district court may award to a convict is capital punishment.

The district court has appellate jurisdiction over all subordinate courts situated in the district on both civil and criminal matters. Subordinate courts, on the civil side (in ascending order) are, Junior Civil Judge Court, Principal Junior Civil Judge Court, Senior Civil Judge Court (also called sub-court). Subordinate courts, on the criminal side, in ascending order, are Second Class Judicial Magistrate Court, First Class Judicial Magistrate Court, Chief Judicial Magistrate Court.

Certain matters on the criminal or civil sides cannot be tried by a court lower than the district court. The district court thus has original jurisdiction over these cases.

Appeals from the district courts are typically made to the high court of the relevant state. If any of the parties are not satisfied with the decision of the high court, they may then appeal to the Supreme Court under its appellate jurisdiction. In some cases, the Supreme Court may grant leave under Article 136 of the Constitution to appeal a decision of the district court directly.

== See also ==
- District Munsiff Court
- Sessions Court
- District Courts of Delhi
- Nyaya Panchayat
- Pendency of court cases in India
