= Bikaner House =

Building in New Delhi, India

Coordinates: 28.608901°N 77.229949°E

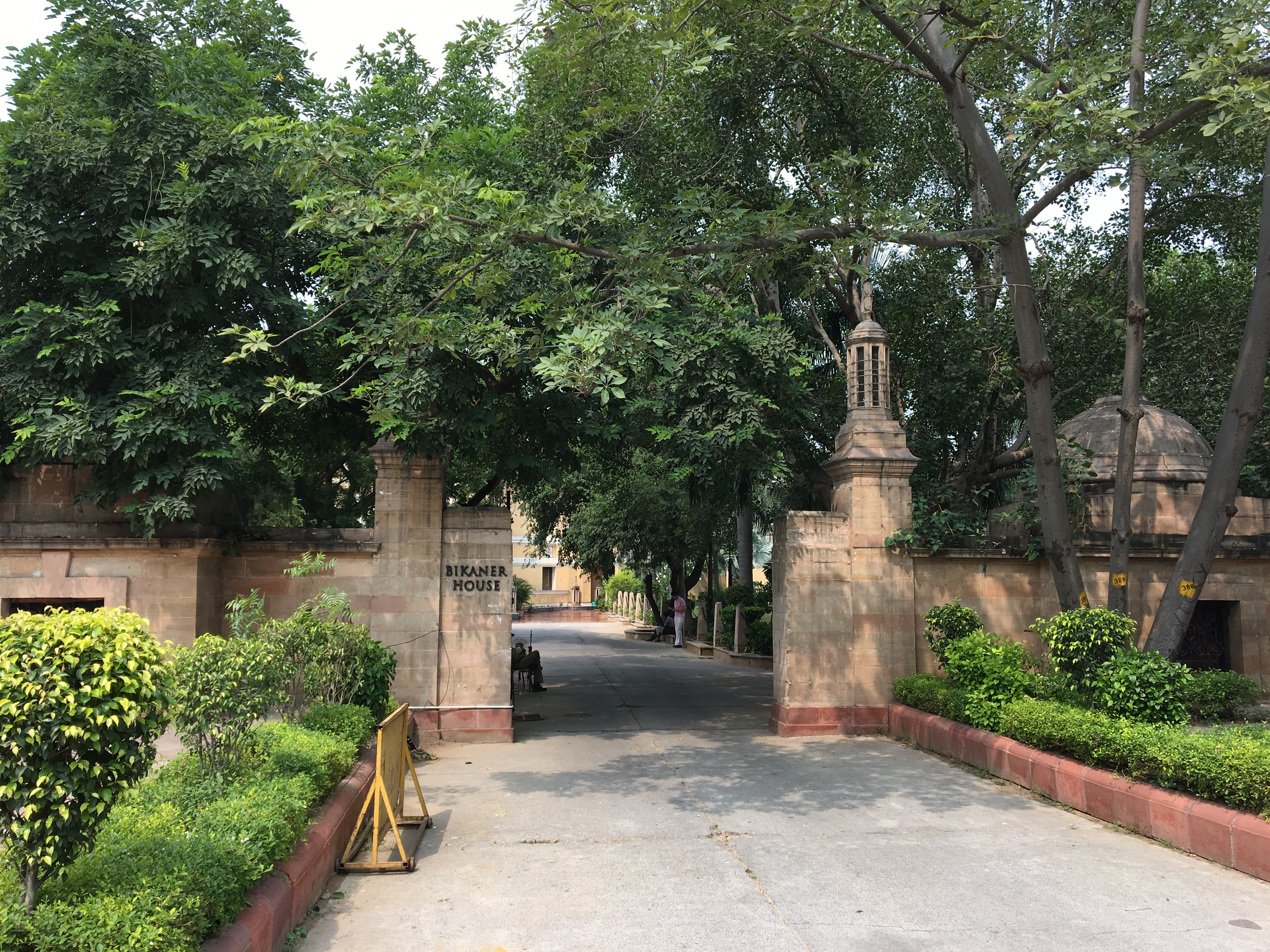
- Interactive map of the Bikaner House area

General information
- Owner: Before: Bikaner state Now: Rajasthan Government

Technical details
- Floor area: 8 acres

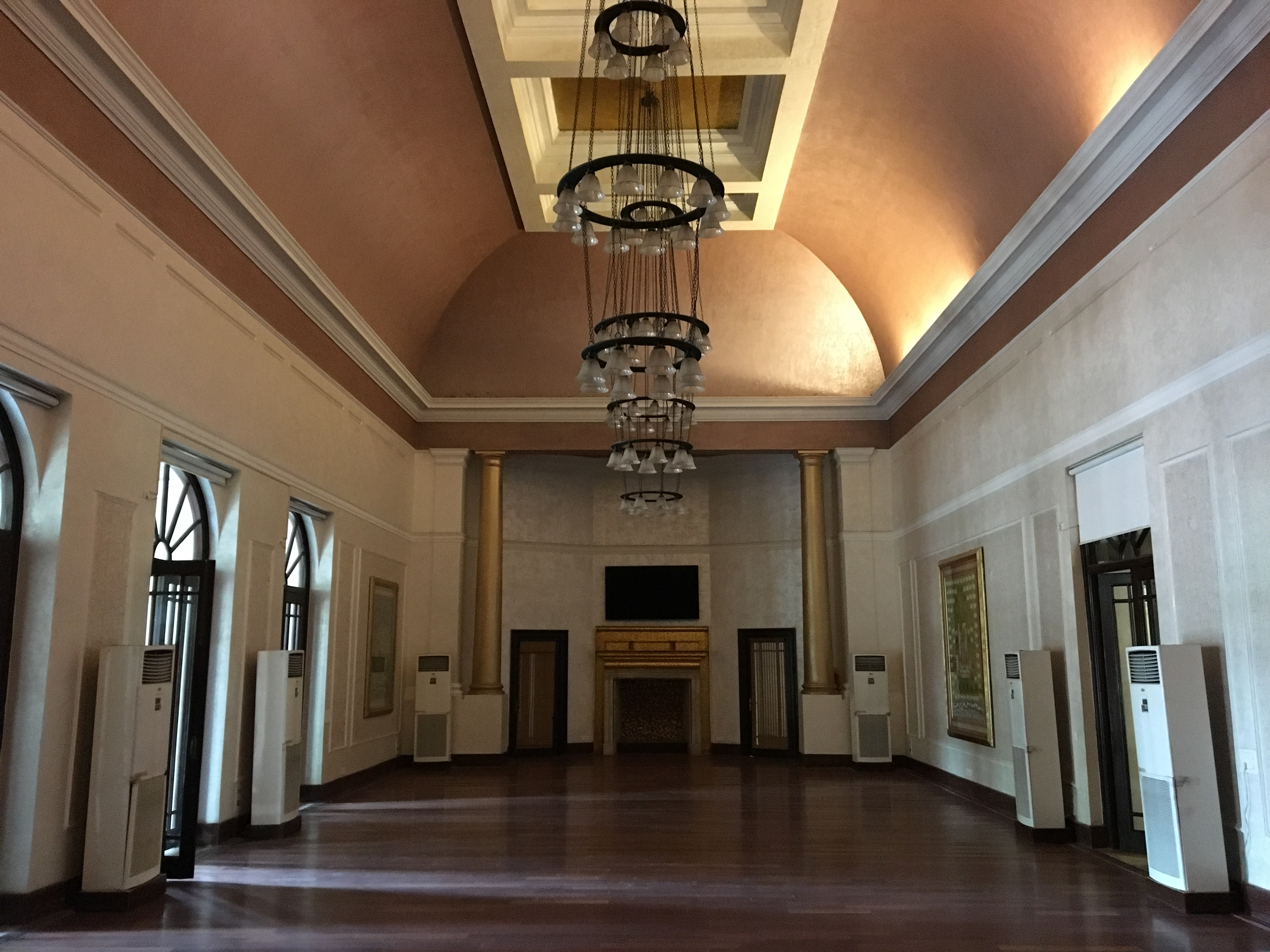
Ballroom of Bikaner House

Bikaner House is the former residence of the Maharaja of Bikaner State in New Delhi. It is located close to India Gate.

== History ==
After the British Raj set up the Chamber of Princes, the rulers needed a residence in the capital city. A number of palaces were constructed in New Delhi, at the coveted Princes’ Park. Around the statue of King George V are the Hyderabad House, Baroda House, Patiala House, Jaipur House, Darbhanga House and Bikaner.

It was designed by Charles G Blomfield. After India's independence in 1947, it was bought by the Government of Rajasthan. The building underwent renovation and reopened in 2015 as a space for arts and culture.

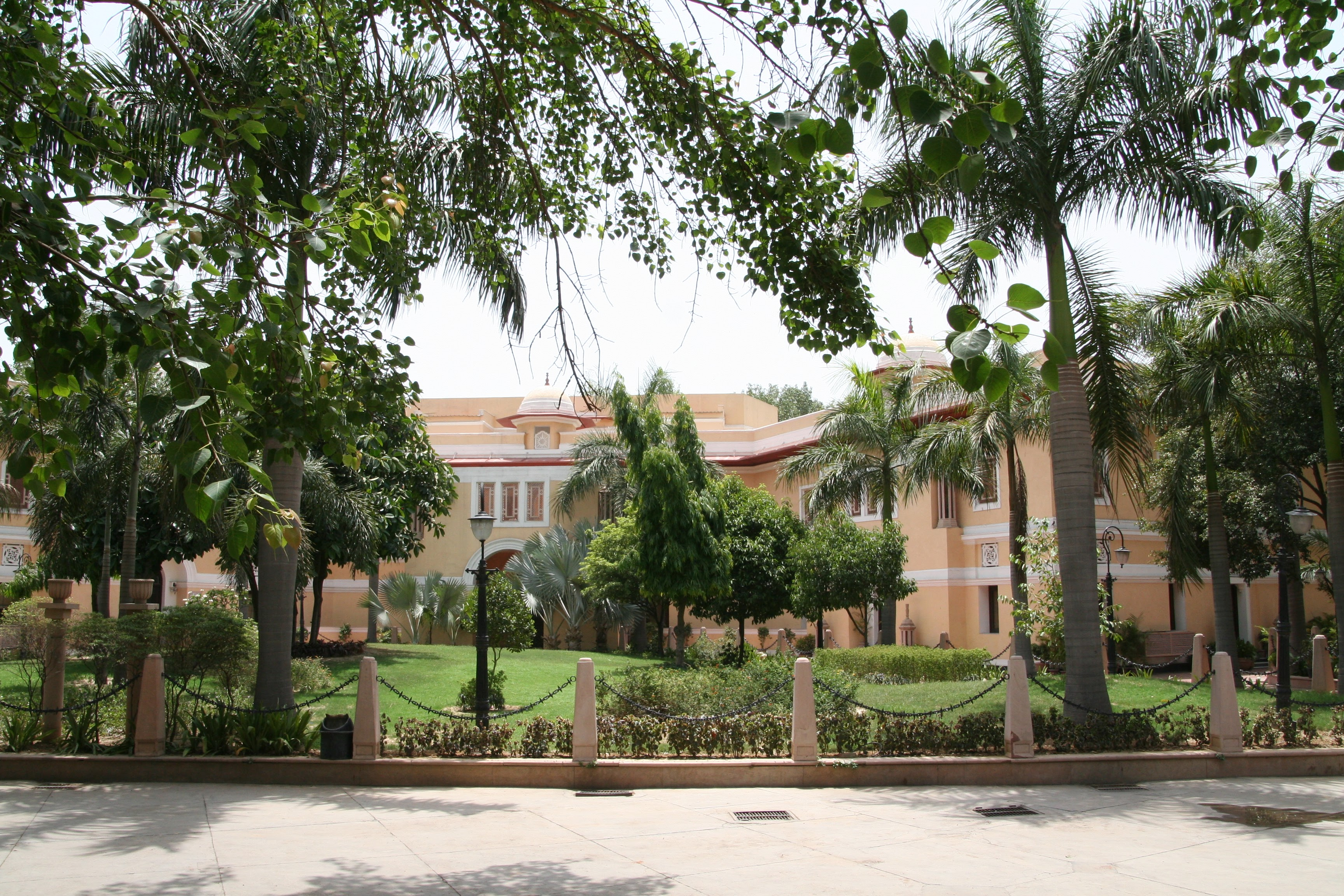
Bikaner House Facade

== Architecture ==
It is spread over an 8-acre plot in Lutyens' Delhi. Among the princely residences, Bikaner House was the least grand in design, as it was constructed closer to a bungalow in design than a palace.

== See also ==
- Hyderabad House
- Jaipur House
- Baroda House
- Patiala House
- Udaipur House
