= Baroda House =

Historic building in Delhi, India

Coordinates: 28.616831°N 77.230480°E

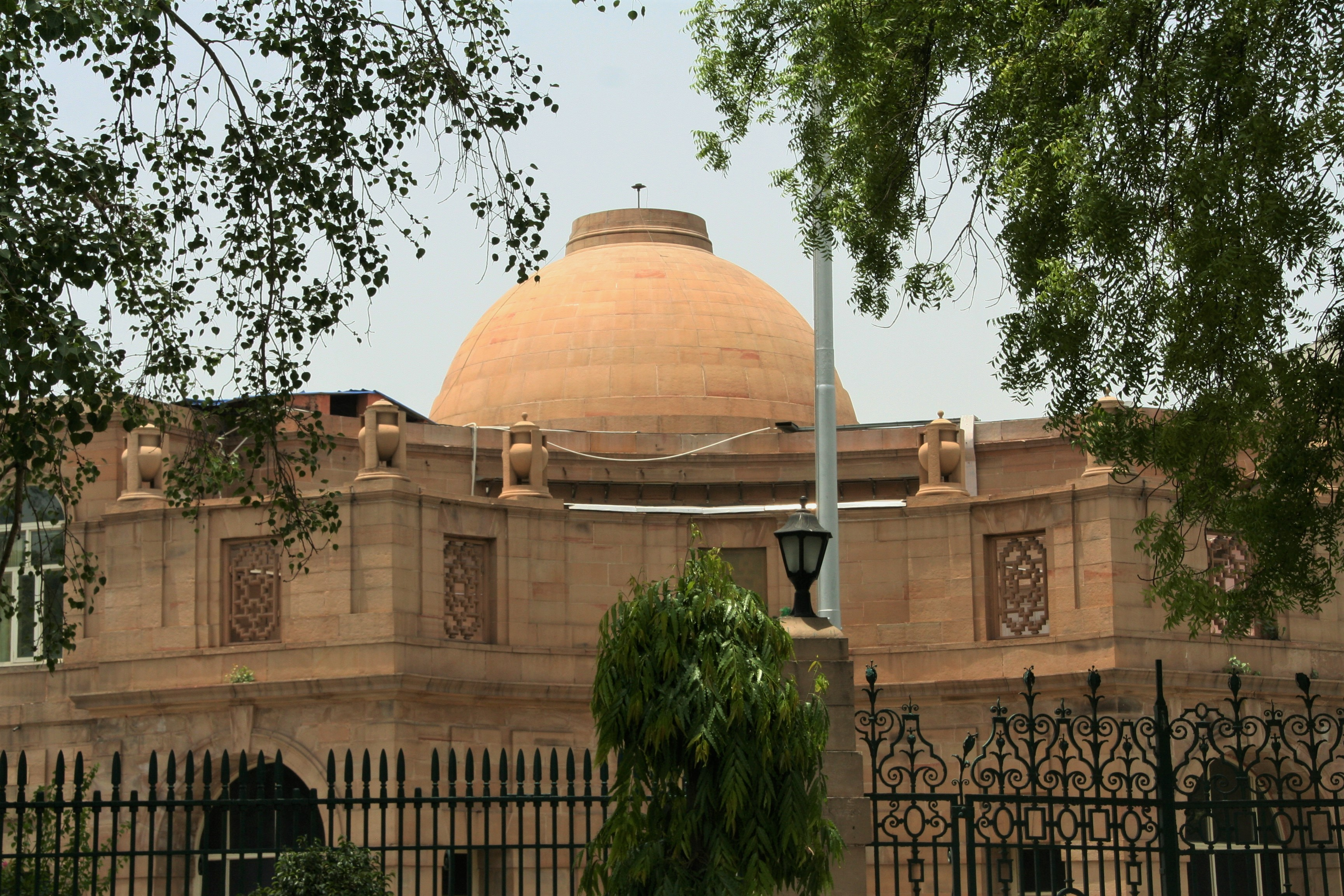
- Interactive map of the Baroda House area

General information
- Construction started: 1921
- Completed: 1936
- Owner: Before: Baroda state Now: Indian Railways

Technical details
- Floor area: 8 acres

Design and construction
- Architect: Sir Edwin Lutyens

Baroda House was the residence of the Maharaja of Baroda in Delhi. It is located on Kasturba Gandhi Marg, next to Faridkot House.

== History ==
It was designed by the architect of New Delhi Sir Edwin Lutyens and contracted by Sir Sobha Singh. He designed the house on a train and it took 15 years to complete in 1936. Presently, it is being used as the Zonal Headquarters of Northern Railways.

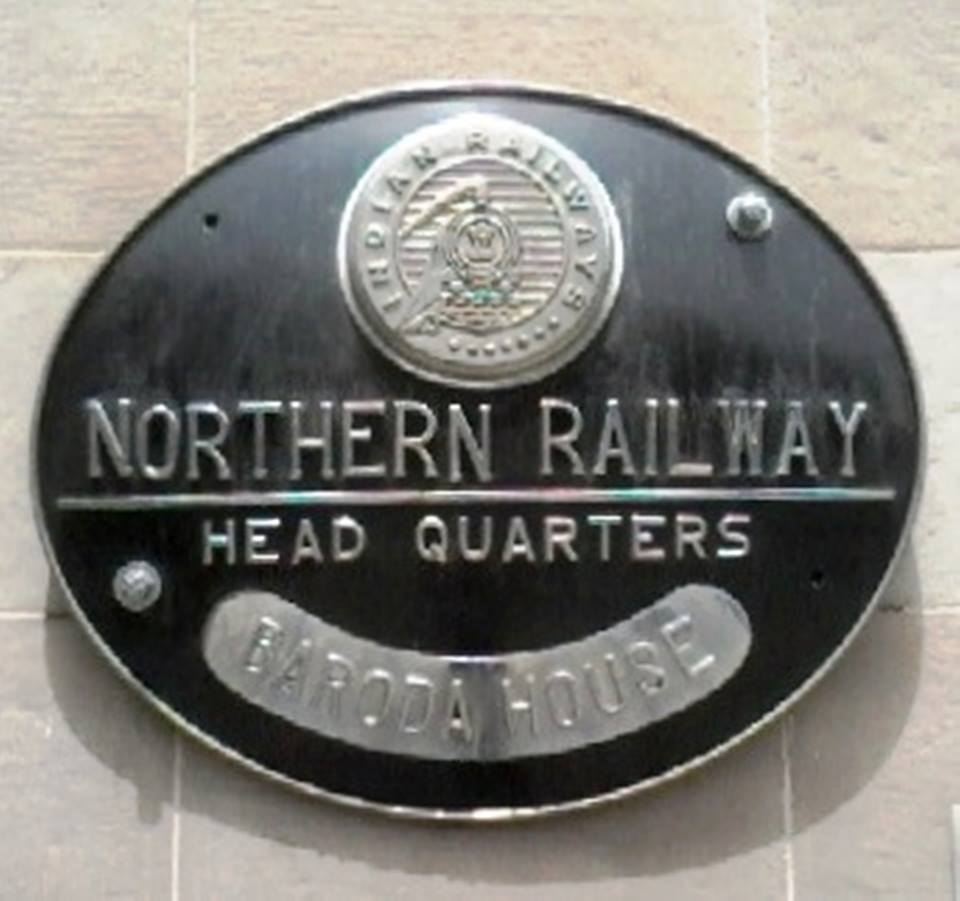
Plaque of the Northern Railway at Baroda House

== See also ==
- Hyderabad House
- Bikaner House
- Jaipur House
- Patiala House
- Udaipur House
