= India Gate =

War memorial arch in New Delhi, India

- India
- For the martyred soldiers of the Indian Armies who fell during World War I and the Third Anglo-Afghan War
- Established: 10 February 1921; 105 years ago (British Raj )
- Unveiled: 12 February 1931; 95 years ago
- Location: 28°36′46.31″N 77°13′45.5″E; New Delhi, Delhi, India
- Designed by: Sir Edwin Lutyens
- 13,313 engraved names, 12,357 Indian and honours 70,000 fallen soldiers of pre-partition undivided India

The India Gate (formerly known as All India War Memorial) is a war memorial arch that’s located near the Rajpath (officially called Kartavya Path) on the eastern edge of the "ceremonial axis" of New Delhi, India. It stands as a memorial to exactly 74,187 Indian soldiers of the British Indian Army who died between 1914 and 1921 during the First World War, in places like France, Flanders, Mesopotamia, Persia, East Africa, Gallipoli, in the Near and Far East, and the 1919 Third Anglo-Afghan War. Around 13,300 British Empire servicemen's names, including some soldiers and officers from the United Kingdom, are also inscribed onto the gate. Designed by architect sir Edwin Lutyens, the gate evokes the architectural style of the ancient Roman triumphal arches, such as the Arch of Constantine in Rome, Italy and later memorial arches; it is often compared to the Arc de Triomphe in Paris, France and the Gateway of India in Mumbai, India.

Following the Indo-Pakistani war of 1971, a structure consisting of a black marble plinth with a reversed rifle, capped by a war helmet and bounded by four eternal flames, was built beneath the archway. This structure, called Amar Jawan Jyoti (Flame of the Immortal Soldier), had between 1971 and 2019, until replaced by the Indian national war memorial, served as India's Tomb of the Unknown Soldier. The India Gate is counted amongst one of the largest war memorials in India and every year during Republic Day, the Indian Prime Minister visits the Gate to pay their tributes to the Indian national war memorial, following which the Republic Day parade starts. India Gate is often a location for civil society protests, and is popular among tourists.

== History ==
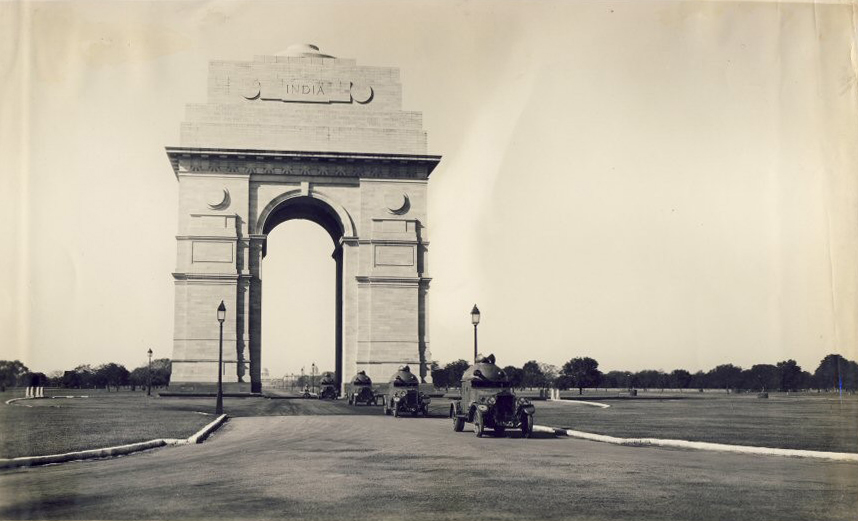
Armoured cars passing through the gate, during the 1930s

The India Gate was part of the work of the Imperial War Graves Commission, which came into existence in December 1917 under the British Indian Raj rule for building war graves and memorials to soldiers who, on behalf of the UK and its British Empire, were killed during the Great War or World War One. The foundation stone of the Gate, then called the All India War Memorial, was laid on 10 February 1921, at 4:30 p.m., by the visiting Duke of Connaught in a ceremony attended by officers and men of the Imperial Indian Army, Imperial Service Troops, the Commander-in-Chief, and also Lord Chelmsford, the Viceroy. On the occasion, the Viceroy is reported to have said, "The stirring tales of individual heroism, will live forever in the annals of this country", and that the memorial which was a tribute to the memory of heroes, "known and unknown", would inspire future generations to endure hardships with similar fortitude and 'no less valour'. The Duke also read out a message from the King, which said, "On this spot, in the central vista of the Capital of India, there will stand a Memorial Archway, designed to keep", in the thoughts of future generations, "the glorious sacrifice of the officers and men of the Indian Army who fought and fell". During the ceremony, the Deccan Horse, 3rd Sappers and Miners, 6th Jat Light Infantry, 34th Sikh Pioneers, 39th Garhwal Rifles, 59th Scinde Rifles (Frontier Force), 117th Mahrattas, and 5th Gurkha Rifles paraded. The land was owned by contractor Sir Sobha Singh who helped construct large tracts of New Delhi and was the primary contractor.

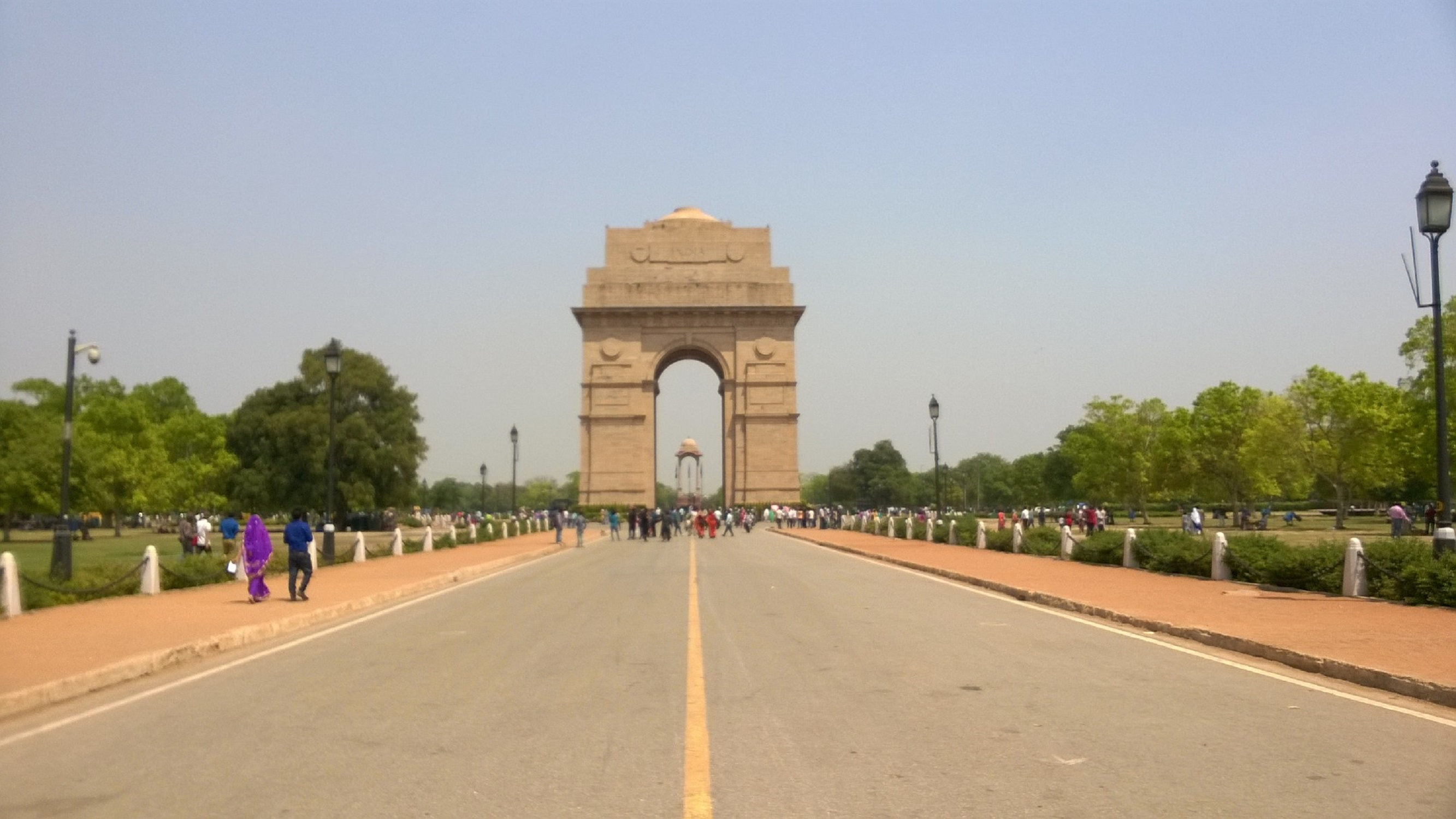
India gate, as seen from Kartavya Path

Ten years after the foundation stone's laying on 12 February 1931, the memorial was inaugurated by the British Viceroy, Lord Irwin, who, on the occasion, said "those who after us shall look upon this monument may learn in pondering its purpose something of that sacrifice and service which the names upon its walls record." In the decade between the laying of foundation stone of the memorial and its inauguration, the rail-line was shifted to run along the Yamuna River, and the New Delhi Railway Station was opened in 1926.

The Gate, which is illuminated every evening from 7 o’clock until 9:30 hrs, today serves as one of Delhi's most important tourist attractions. Cars used to travel through the gate until it was closed to traffic. The Republic Day Parade starts from Rashtrapati Bhavan and passes around the India Gate. The India Gate is often a location for civil society protests, including demonstrations in response to the 2011 anti-corruption movement.

In 2017, the India Gate was twinned with the Arch of Remembrance in Leicester, England, UK, another Lutyens war memorial, following a very similar design but on a smaller scale. In a ceremony, India's High Commissioner to the United Kingdom laid a wreath at the arch in Leicester and the British High Commissioner to India laid one at the India Gate.

== Design and structure ==
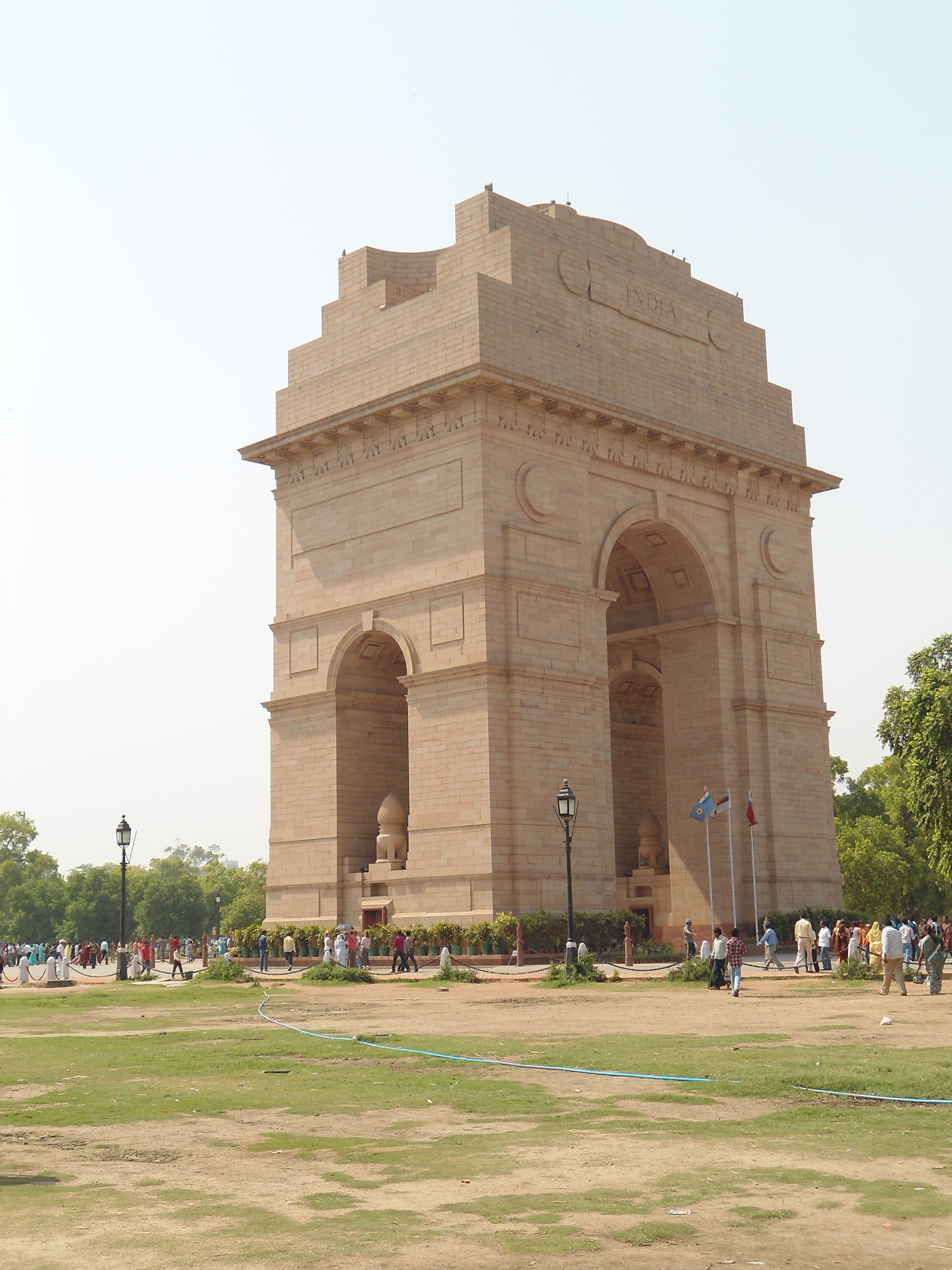
Memorial view from the east

The memorial gate was designed by sir Edwin Lutyens, who was not only the main architect of New Delhi, India, but also a member of the Imperial War Graves Commission and one of Europe's foremost designers of war graves and memorials. He designed sixty-six war memorials in Europe, including the highly regarded Cenotaph in London in 1919, the first national war memorial erected after World War I, for which he was commissioned by David Lloyd George, the British Prime Minister. The memorial in New Delhi, like the Cenotaph in London, is a secular memorial, free of religious and "culturally-specific iconography such as crosses". Lutyens according to his biographer, Christopher Hussey, relied on the "elemental mode", a style of commemoration based on a "universal architectural style free of religious ornamentation".

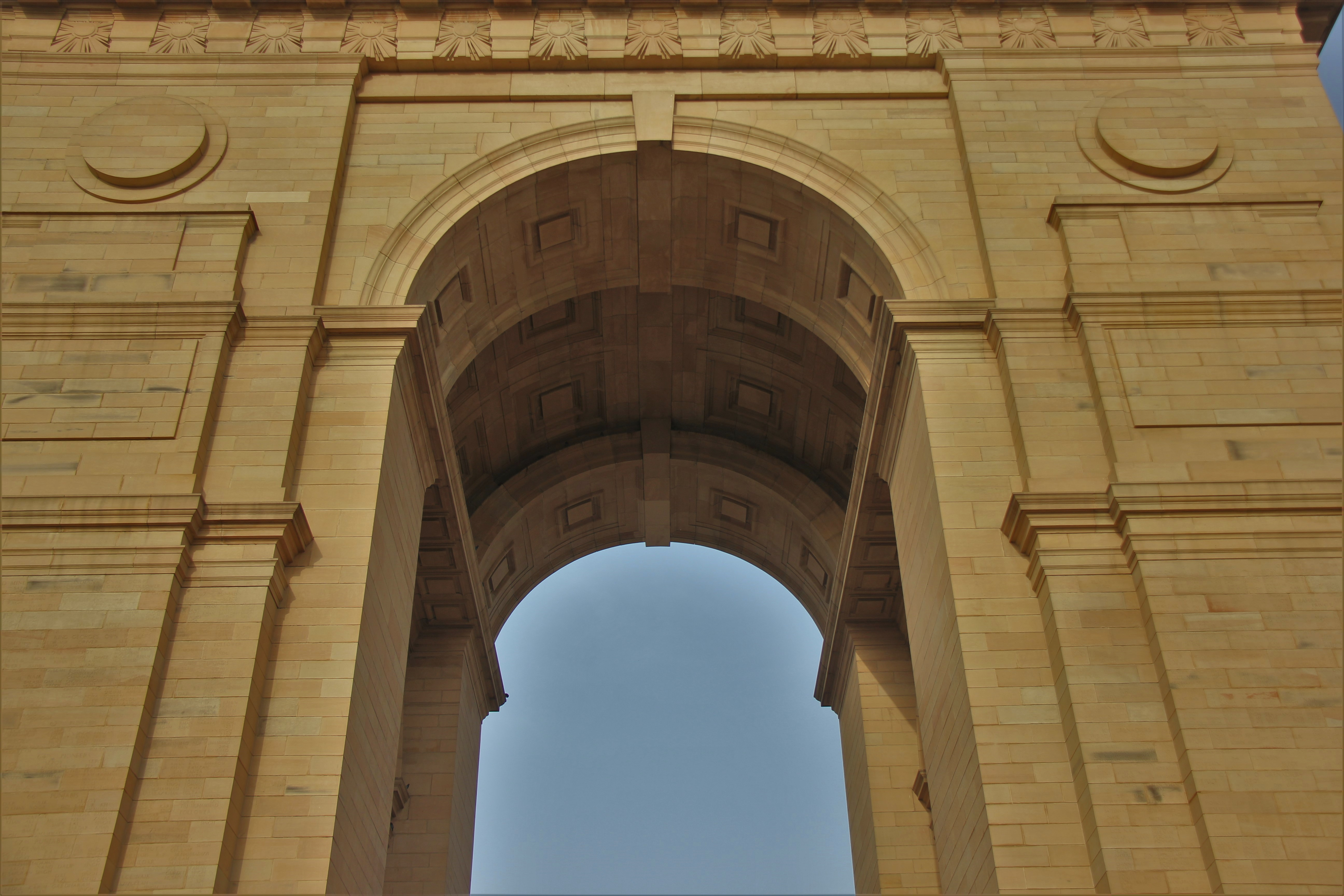
Looking up, through the main part of the arch

The India Gate, which has been called a "creative reworking of the Arc de Triomphe" has a span of 30 feet (9.1 m) across the larger opening and lies on the eastern axial end of Kingsway, present-day Kartavya Path, the central vista and main ceremonial procession route in New Delhi. The 42-metre-tall (138 ft) India Gate stands on a low base of red Bharatpur stone and rises in stages to a huge cornice moulding above a frieze with sunburst motifs. The shallow domed bowl at the top was intended to be filled with burning oil on anniversaries, but this is rarely done. The memorial-gate hexagon complex, with a diameter of about 625 metres (2,051 ft), covers approximately 306,000 m^{2} (3,290,000 sq ft) in area.

The India Gate structure is oblong, with a large archway on each of the four faces, but the arches on the long sides are larger and higher. The arches on the shorter sides are blocked at the bottom, with doorways, but open higher up. Technically the four arches make the building a tetrapylon. There is a large ornament in stone above the blocked bottom of the arches on the shorter sides. Mouldings run around the building at the levels from which both sizes of arch rise, and the keystones of the arches protrude slightly. The top of the keystones on the short sides' arches touch the bottom of the moulding at the base level of the higher long sides' arches. The ceilings and undersides of the arches are decorated with well-spaced coffers.

=== Inscriptions ===
The cornice of the India Gate is inscribed with Imperial suns while both sides of the arch have INDIA, flanked by the dates MCMXIV ('1914'; on the left) and MCMXIX ('1919'; on the right). Below the word INDIA, in capital letters, is inscribed:

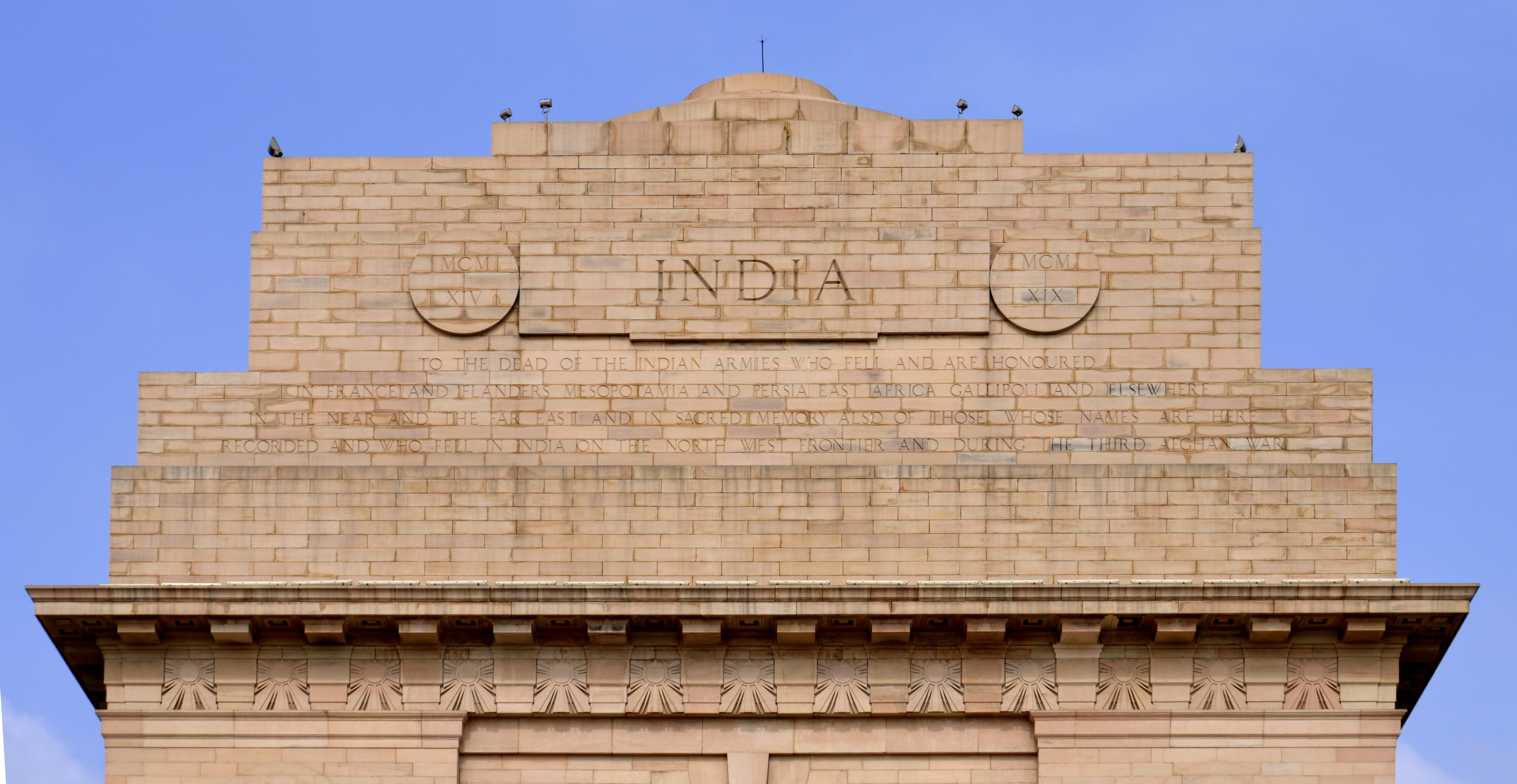
Inscription at top of the gate

To the dead of the Indian Armies who fell and are honoured in France and Flanders, Mesopotamia and Persia, East Africa, Gallipoli and elsewhere in the Near and Far East and in Sacred Memory also of those whose names are here recorded and who fell in India on the North West Frontier and during the Third Afghan War.

13,313 names are engraved out of which 12,357 are Indian. Access to read the names on the memorial is restricted, though they can be seen on the Commonwealth War Graves Commission (CWGC) website, which lists the names with their respective date of death, unit name, regiment, place on gate where name is inscribed, location, and other information).

== Canopy ==
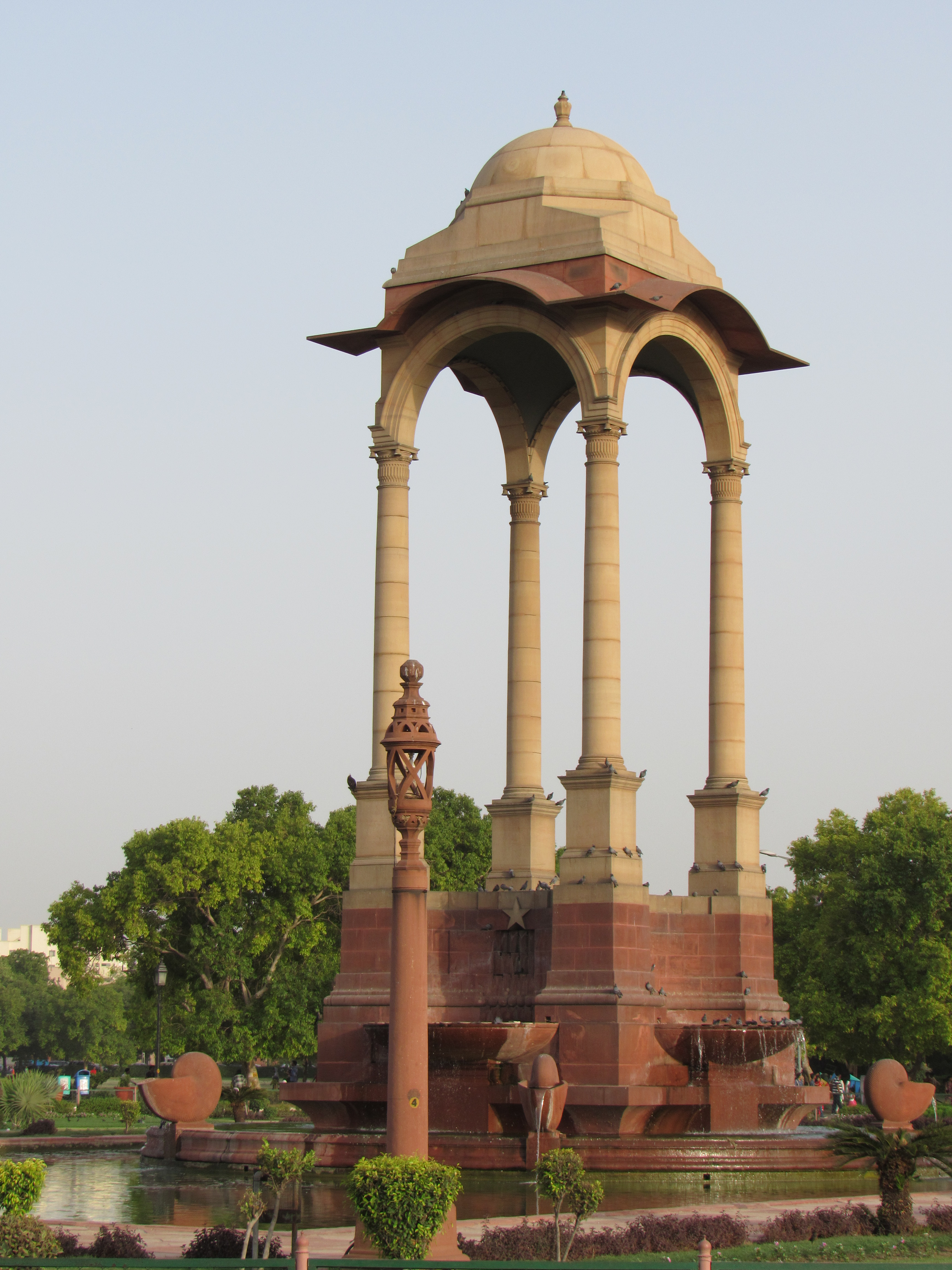
Canopy in the vicinity of the gate

About 150 metres (490 ft) east of the gate, at a junction of six roads, is a 73 feet (22 m) cupola, inspired by a sixth-century pavilion from Mahabalipuram. Lutyens used four Delhi Order columns to support the domed canopy and its chhajja.

=== Statue of King-Emperor George V ===
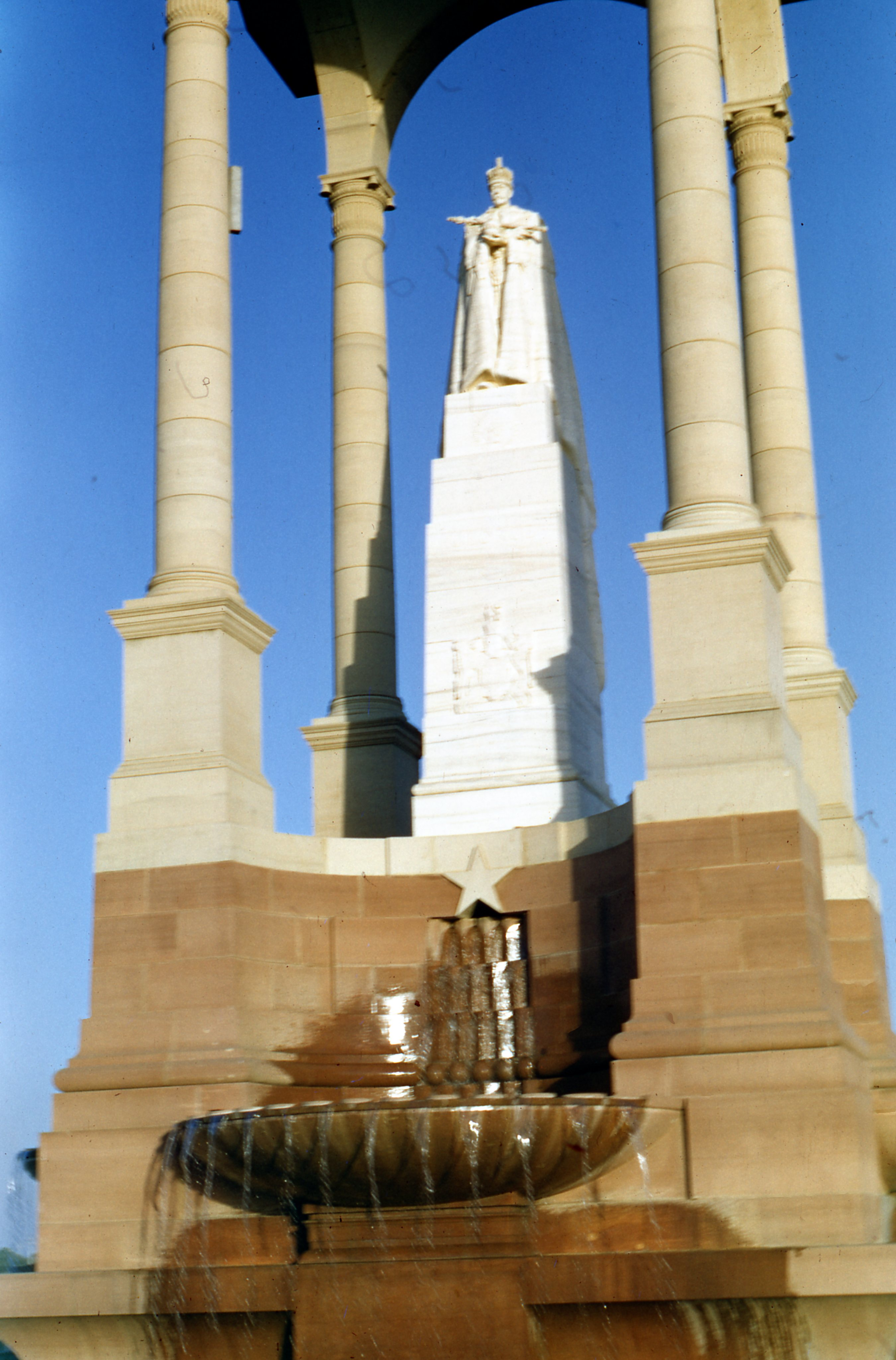
Canopy in 1952 with the George V statue still in place

In the autumn of 1930, Jagatjit Singh, the Maharaja of Kapurthala State, organized an appeal amongst the Indian princely rulers to erect a statue of King-Emperor George V in New Delhi to commemorate the sovereign's recent recovery from sepsis. As originally conceived, the statue would have depicted the monarch in marble riding in a howdah atop a red stone elephant; a canopy was not then included in the design. The final concept, approved by George V before his death, dispensed with the elephant, instead incorporating a red stone canopy and pedestal, with the pedestal standing 34.5 feet (10.52 m) tall. An 18.75 feet (5.72 m) tall marble statue of the King-Emperor wearing his Delhi Durbar coronation robes and Imperial State Crown, bearing the British globus cruciger and sceptre, was placed atop the pedestal, which bore the Royal Coat of Arms and the inscription GEORGE V R I, the "R I" designating him as 'Rex Imperator' or 'King Emperor'.

The combined height of the statue and pedestal was 53.25 feet (16.23 m); while the pedestal and canopy were designed by Lutyens, the statue was designed by Charles Sargeant Jagger of the Royal Academy of Arts. The canopy was topped by a gilded Tudor Crown and bore the Royal Cyphers of George V, with the completed monument intended to "mark the loyalty and attachment of the Ruling Princes and Chiefs of India to the Person and Throne of the King-Emperor." Following the premature death of Jagger, the statue's head and crown were completed by one of his assistants in England and then shipped to India, while the remainder of the monument was carved in India.

The statue's installation in the autumn of 1936, amidst the Indian independence movement, made it a target for Independence activists; on the night of 3 January 1943, during the Quit India movement, Hemwati Nandan Bahuguna and Manubhai Shah scaled the statue, smashed its nose and draped it with a large black cloth inscribed "Death to the Tyrant." The statue remained standing at its original site for two decades following the nation's independence in 1947, but certain political factions increasingly objected to its continued presence in its central location, particularly after the tenth anniversary of Independence and the centennial of the Indian Rebellion of 1857. On the night of 12–13 August 1958, the royal insignia of George V and the Tudor Crown atop the canopy were removed.

With increasing pressure from Socialist members of Parliament, then-Deputy Minister Home Affairs Lalit Narayan Mishra stated in May 1964 that all British statuary would be removed from the national capital by 1966. Two days before Independence Day in 1965, members of the Samyukta Socialist Party overpowered two constables guarding the site, covered the statue in tar and defaced its imperial crown, nose and one ear, also leaving a photo of Subhas Chandra Bose at the monument. Despite the resulting adverse publicity and the growing controversy over the situation, the matter of relocating the statue dragged on for several years. The British government rejected a proposal to repatriate the monument to the United Kingdom, citing the lack of an appropriate site and sufficient funds, while the British High Commission in New Delhi declined to have the statue relocated to their compound, due to limited space. Efforts to move the statue to a Delhi park were strongly opposed by the nationalist Bharatiya Jana Sangh, which then held power in the city. Finally, in late 1968, the statue was removed from its position beneath the canopy and briefly placed in storage before being moved to Delhi's Coronation Park, where it joined other British Raj-era statues.

During and after the statue's removal, it was often suggested that a statue of Mahatma Gandhi be placed under the canopy. The suggestion was even discussed in the Indian Parliament. In 1981, the government had in response to a question in the Parliament, confirmed that it was considering the installation of a Gandhi statue under the empty canopy, but nothing came of it.

=== Statue of Subhas Chandra Bose ===
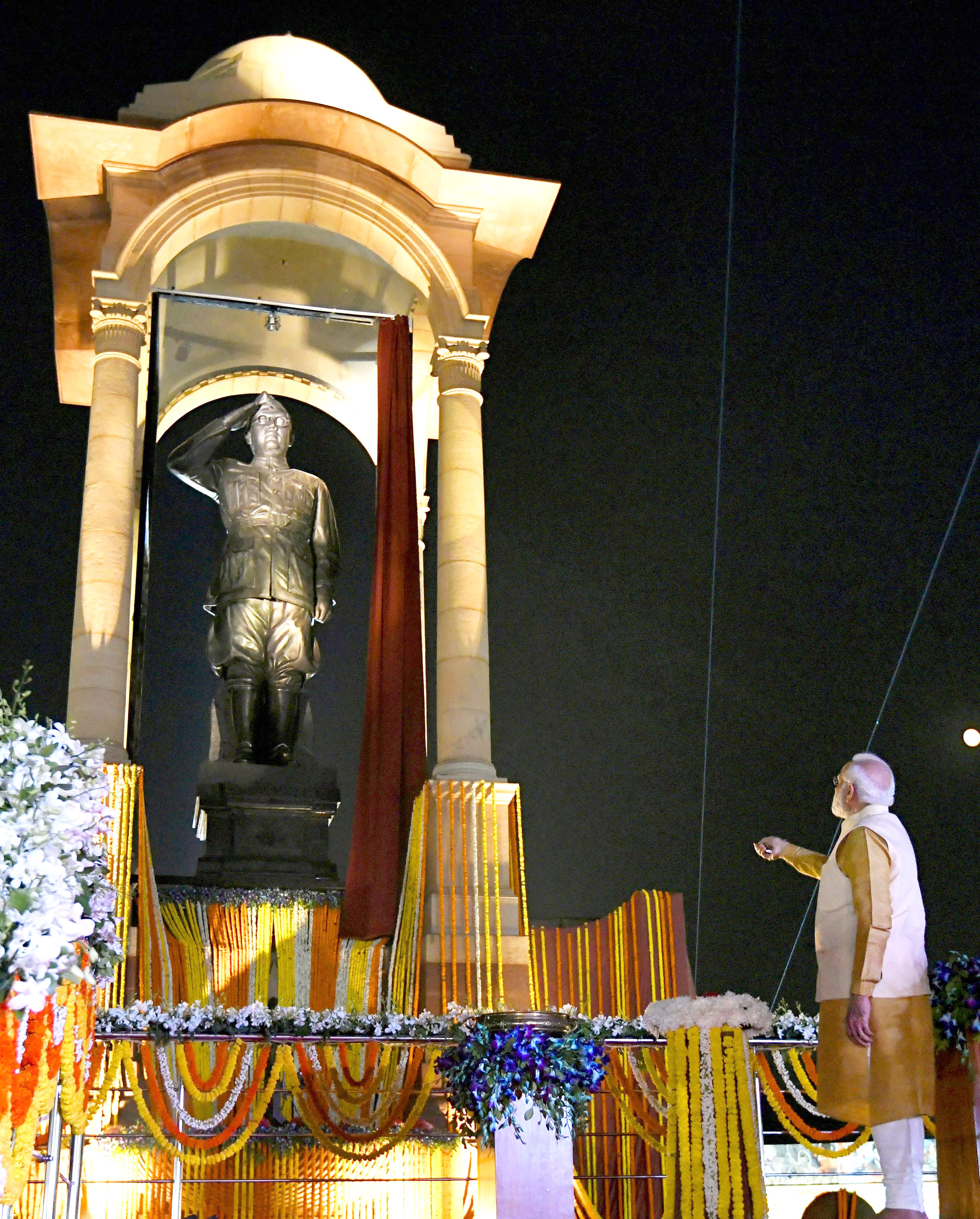
Prime Minister Narendra Modi unveils the statue of Netaji Subhas Chandra Bose at India Gate, during the inauguration of the 'Kartavya Path', in New Delhi on 8 September 2022.

On 21 January 2022, Prime Minister Narendra Modi announced that a statue of Subhas Chandra Bose would be installed in the canopy at India Gate. The announcement came two days before the 125th anniversary of his birth. A 28 feet high and 6 feet wide 3D holographic statue of Bose was inaugurated at the site on 23 January 2022, celebrated as Parakram Diwas (Courage Day). On this occasion, an award in the name of Bose was instituted for the exemplary work in disaster management. On 8 September 2022, Prime Minister Modi inaugurated the newly made statue of Bose near the India Gate.

== Amar Jawan Jyoti ==
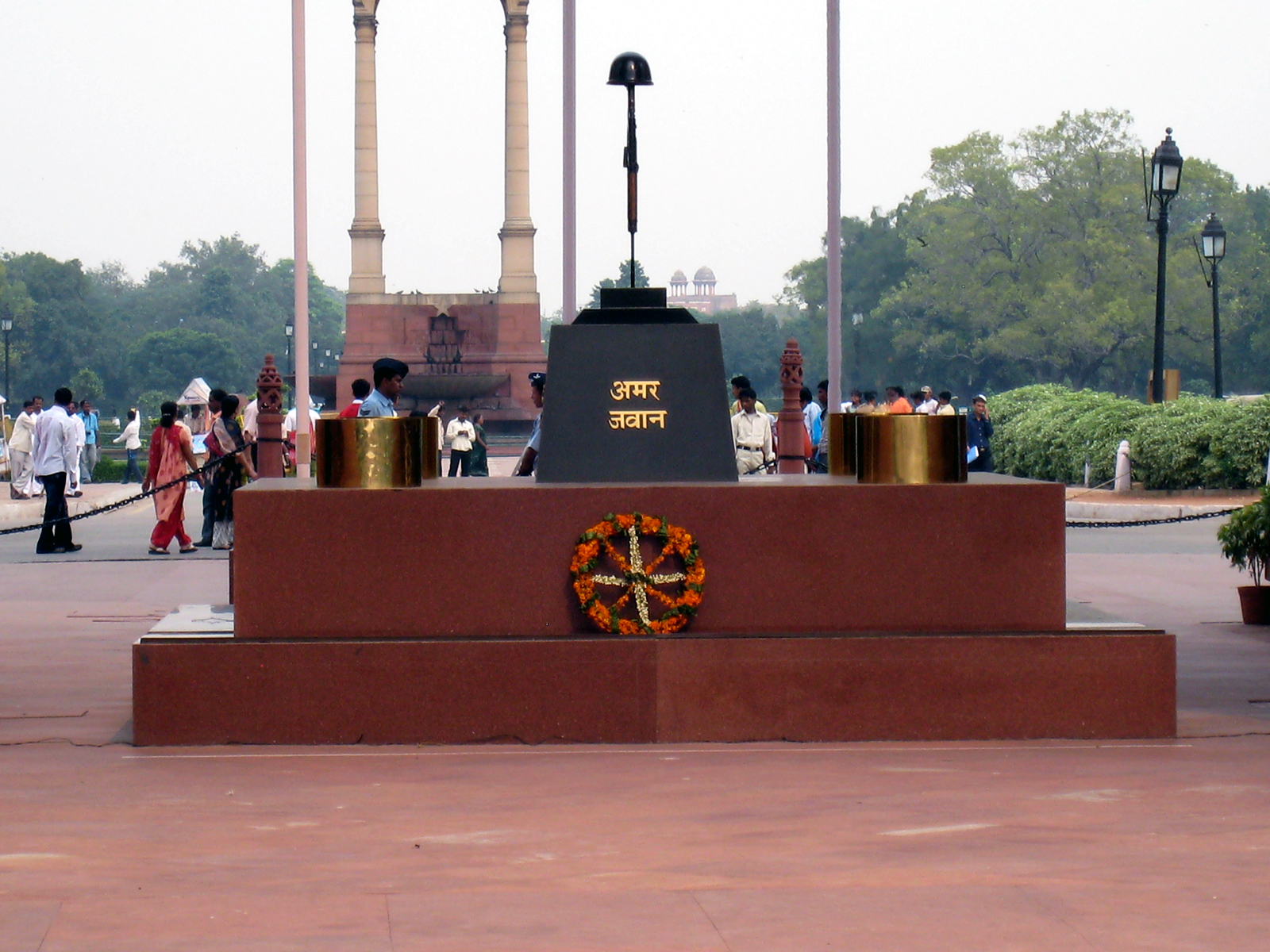
Amar Jawan Jyoti, beneath the arch of the India gate

Amar Jawan Jyoti, or the flame of the immortal soldier, was a structure consisting of black marble plinth, with reversed rifle, capped by war helmet, bound by four urns, each with the permanent light (jyoti) from compressed natural gas flames, erected under the India gate to commemorate Indian soldiers martyred in the war of the liberation of Bangladesh in December 1971. It was inaugurated by the then Prime Minister Indira Gandhi on 26 January 1972, the twenty-third Indian Republic Day.

Since the installation of the Amar Jawan Jyoti, it has served as India's tomb of the unknown soldier. It is staffed around the clock by the Indian armed forces. Wreaths are placed at the Amar Jawan Jyoti every Republic Day, Vijay Diwas, and Infantry Day (Note: Infantry Day is the day Indian infantry air landed at Srinagar on 27 October 1947 to stop and defeat the Pakistani mercenaries' attack on Jammu and Kashmir.) by the Prime Minister and the Chiefs of the Armed Forces.

On 21 January 2022 the Amar Jawan Jyoti at India Gate was merged with the Amar Jawan Jyoti at the National War Memorial.

== National War Memorial ==
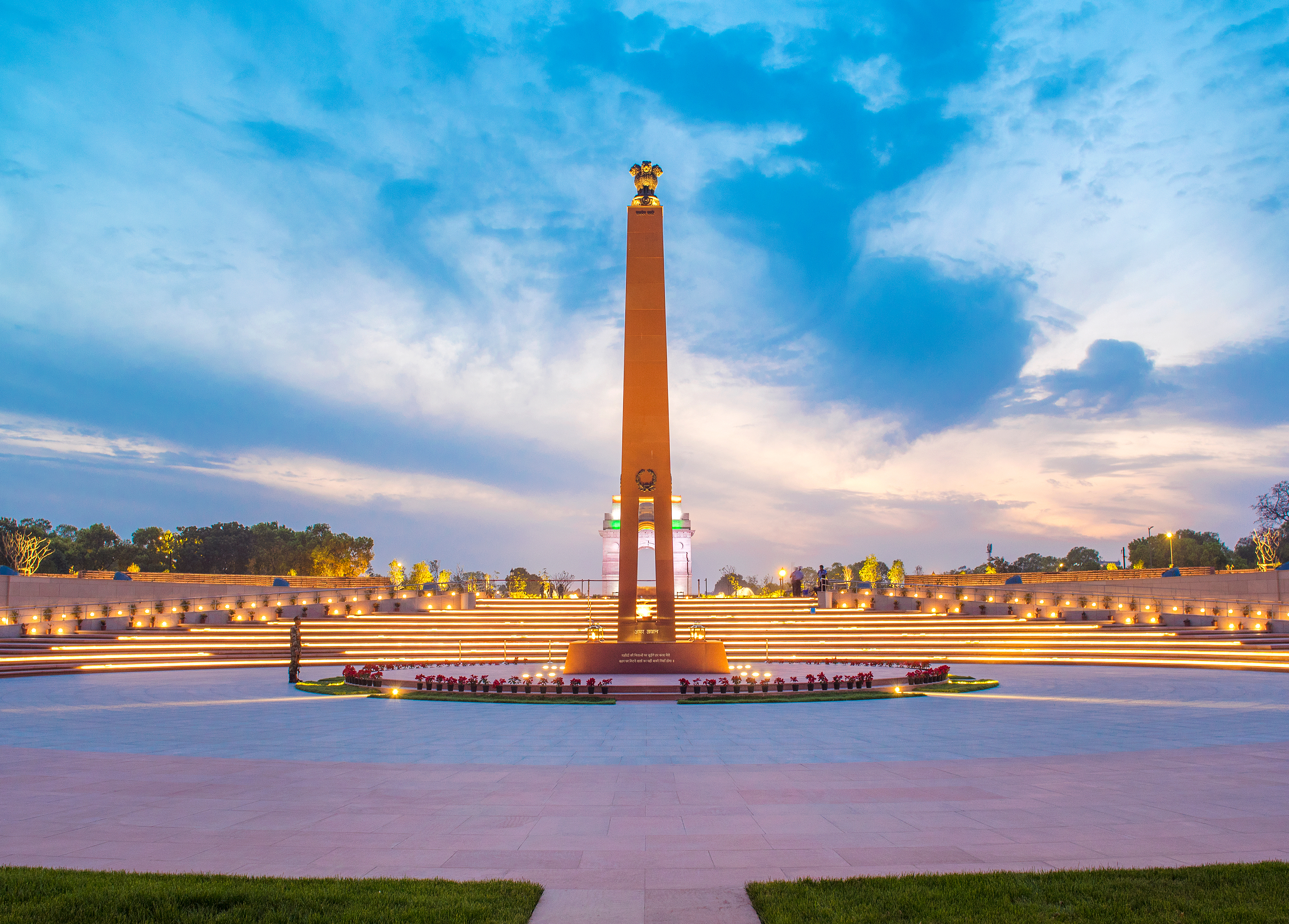
National War Memorial, in front of the India Gate

National War Memorial (NWM) complex and India Gate within the C-Hexagon, with Amar Jawan Jyoti and Netaji hologram statue. The rings of the NWM form a chakravyūha.

In July 2014, the government announced plans to construct a National War Memorial in the C-Hexagon (India Gate Circle), and an adjoining National War Museum. The cabinet allocated ₹500 crore (US$52 million) for the project. The National War Memorial was completed in January, 2019. Since January 2022, it houses the Amar Jawan Jyoti, or the "Flame of the Immortal Soldier".

== Gallery ==
Memorial from the west

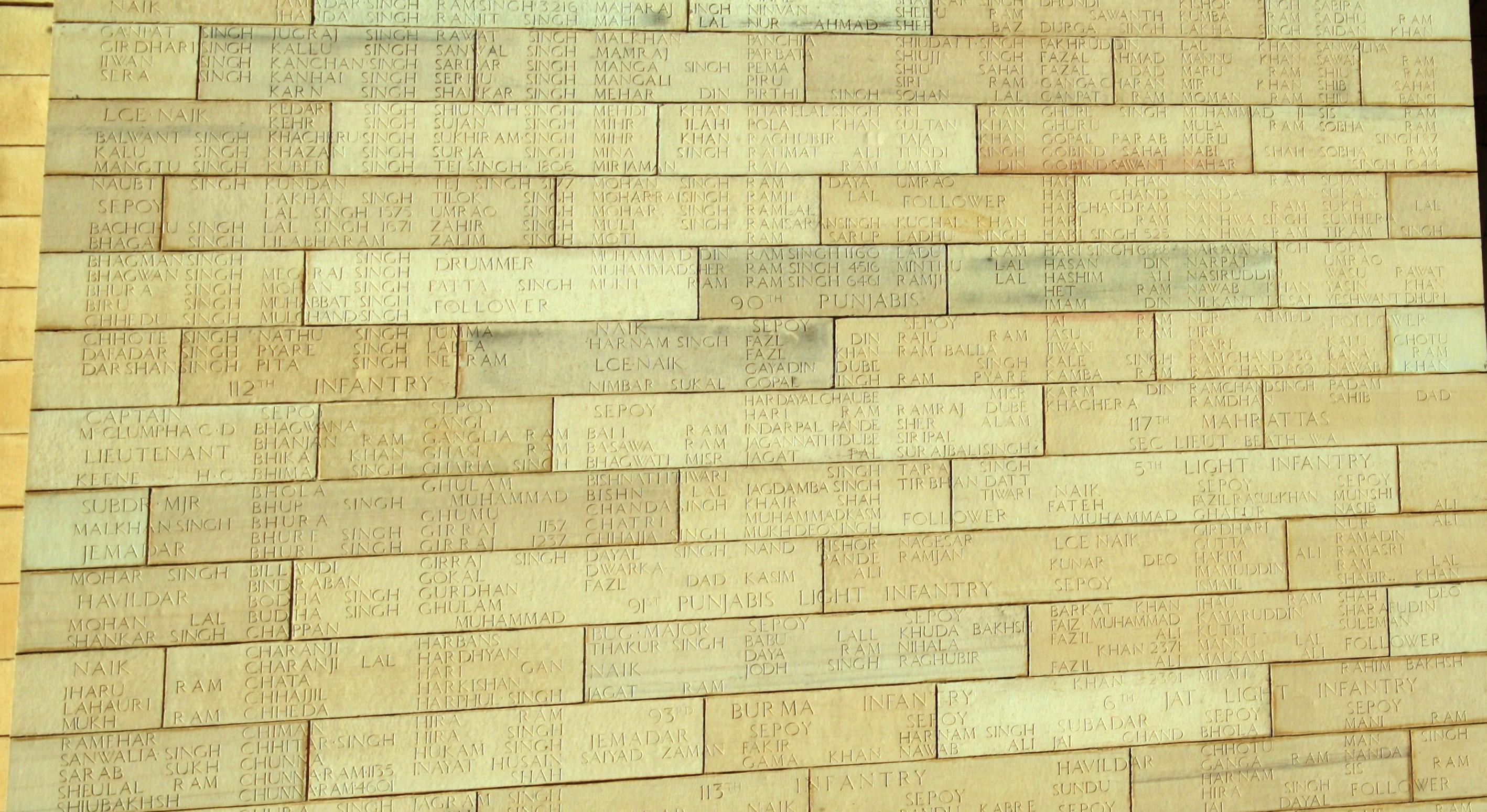
Engravings on the walls of the gate

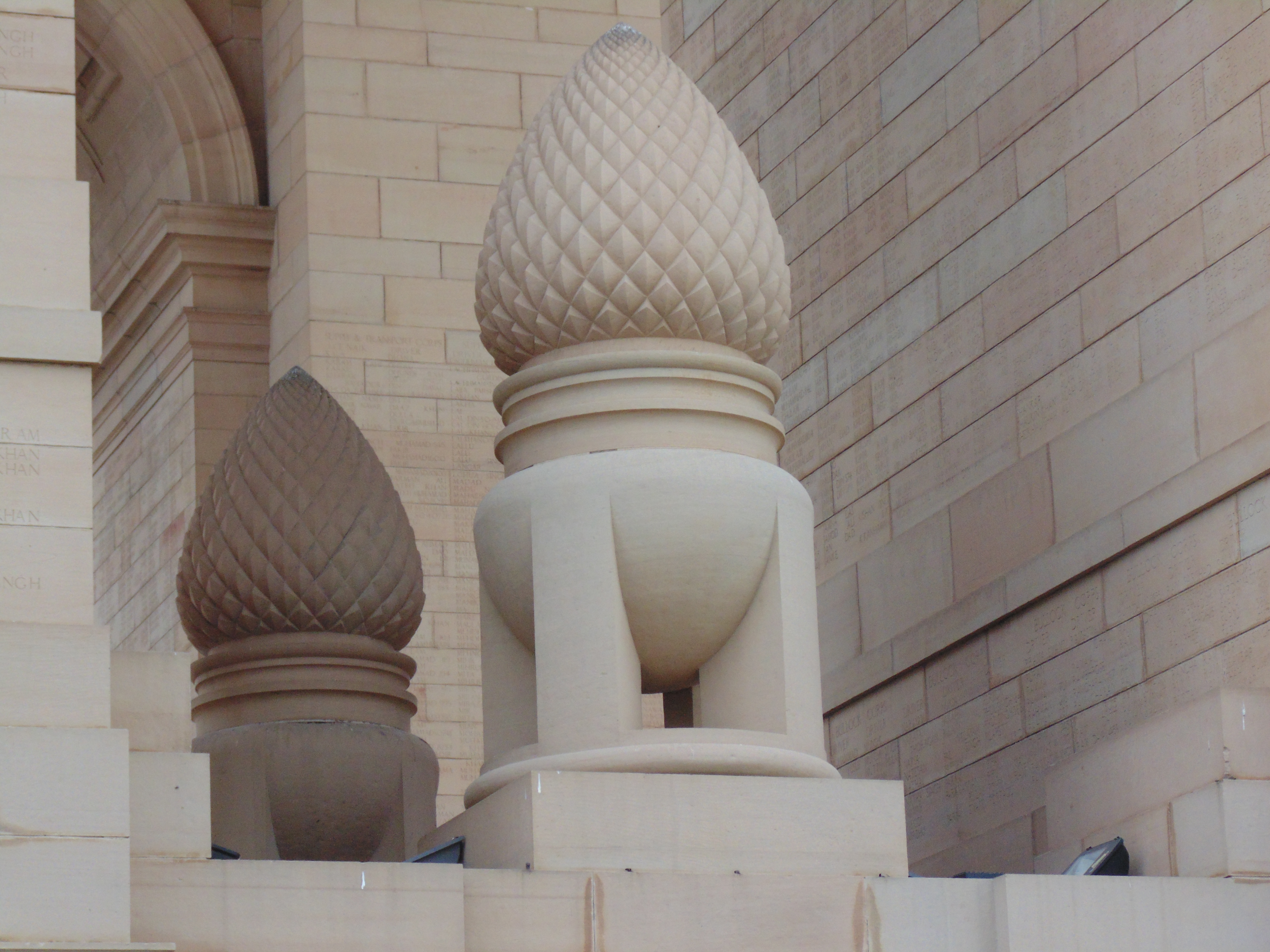
The ornaments on the side axis

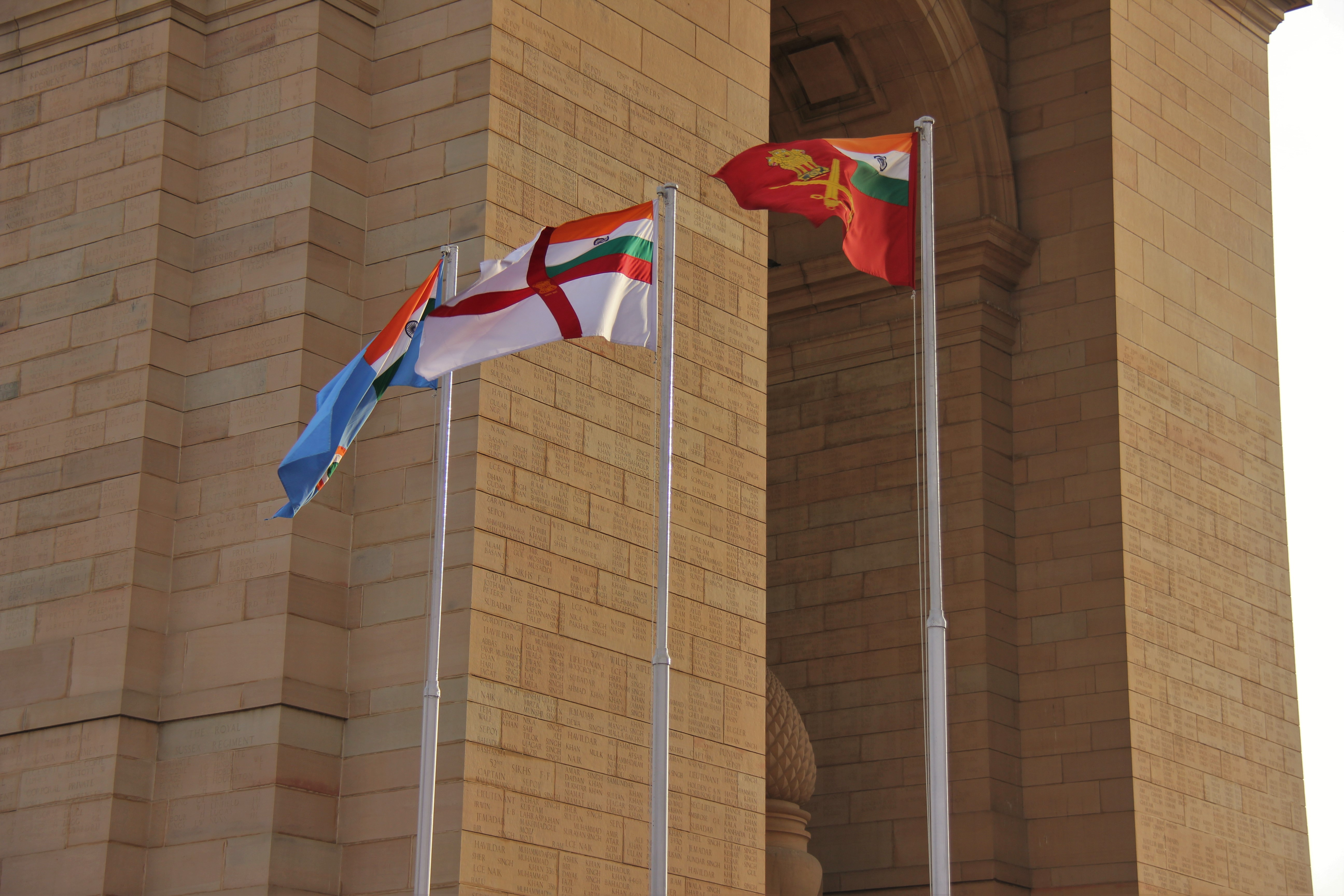
Flags of the Indian Armed Forces at the gate

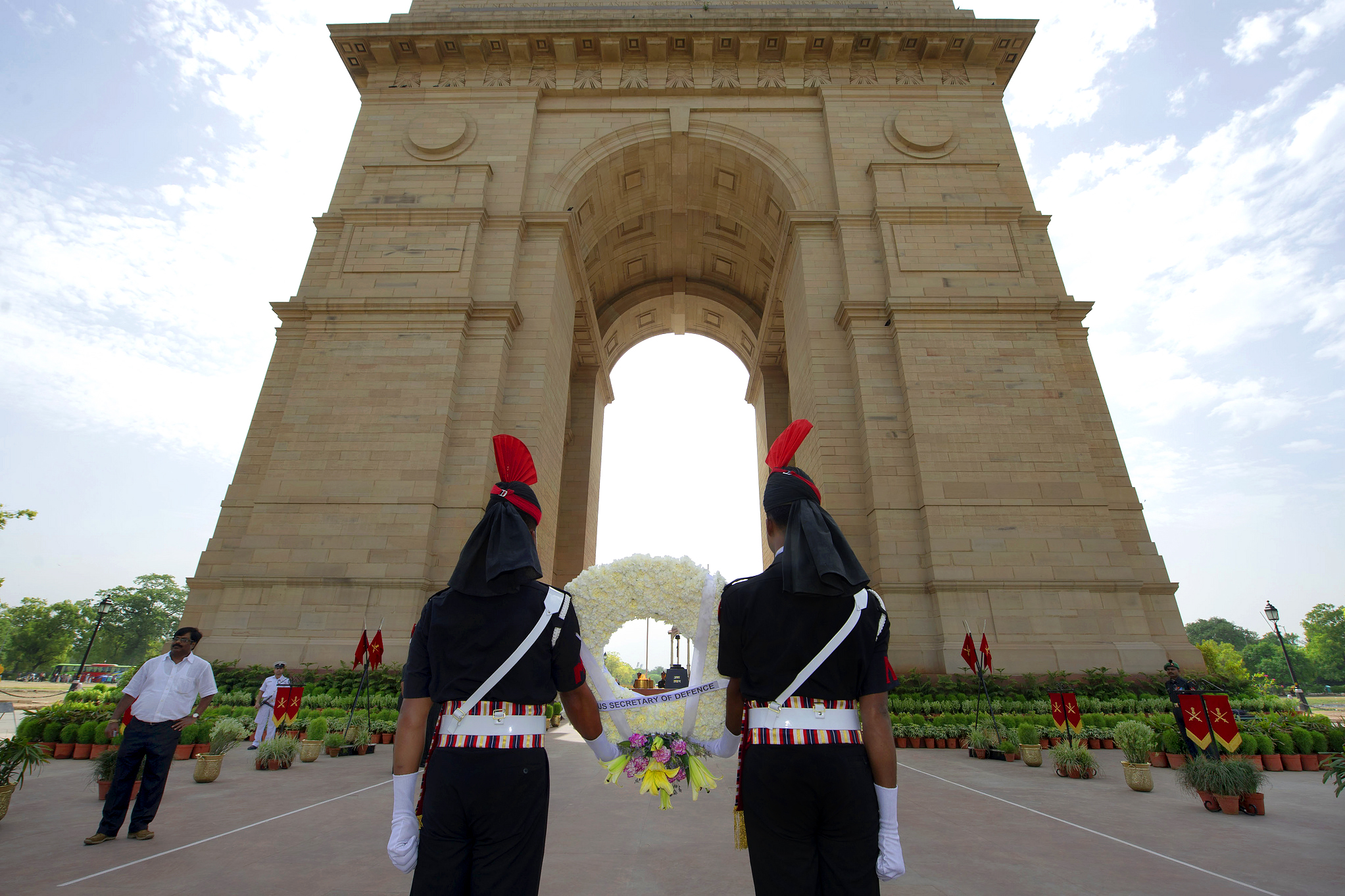
Indian army at the gate

Crowd of people near the memorial

== See also ==
- Gateway of India
- Neuve-Chapelle Indian Memorial
- Delhi War Cemetery
- Amar Jawan Jyoti
- National War Memorial (india)

== Bibliography ==
- Chhina, Rana T.S. (2014). Last Post. Indian War Memorials Around the World (PDF). A public diplomacy initiative of the Ministry of External Affairs. Centre for Armed Forces Historical Research, United Service Institution of India. ISBN 978-81-902097-9-3. Archived (PDF) from the original on 20 January 2022.
