= List of central agencies in India =

Official definitions of what constitutes an agency of the government of India are limited and varied. Article 12 of the India constitution defines "the State" as encompassing the central government, the Indian parliament, the state governments and their respective legislatures, as well as what are termed "local or other authorities." The interpretation of the term "other authorities" has been the subject of extensive judicial scrutiny by the Supreme Court. There have also been several acts of parliament which have included varying definitions of government agencies.

The executive branch of the Indian government comprises the president, the vice president, and the union council of ministers, led by the prime minister. This council is responsible for overseeing the functioning of the country's 53 union ministries. The ministries are staffed by members of the Indian civil services, who constitute the permanent bureaucracy of the executive.

The following is a comprehensive list of agencies operating under the Indian government at the central level. It encompasses the union ministries along with their various departments, attached and subordinate offices, statutory bodies, and other affiliated organisations, alongside independent agencies and bodies. Also included are autonomous institutions, publicly funded and administered educational and research establishments, as well as public sector undertakings, which are companies that are predominantly owned and operated by the Indian government. This list is limited to central government entities and does not cover agencies operating at the state or local levels.

== Parliament ==
- Rajya Sabha
  - Chairman of the Rajya Sabha
  - List of current members of the Rajya Sabha
- Lok Sabha
  - Speaker of the Lok Sabha
  - List of current members of the Lok Sabha
- Standing committee (India)
- State legislative assemblies of India

== Executive ==
- President of India
- Vice President of India
- Prime minister of India
  - Prime Minister's Office (India)
- Union Council of Ministers
- Secretary to the Government of India
- Cabinet Secretary of India
- Civil Services of India

== Judiciary ==
- Chief Justice of India
- Supreme Court of India
- High courts of India
- District courts of India

== Ministry of Agriculture and Farmers' Welfare ==
=== Department of Agriculture and Farmers Welfare ===
==== Attached and subordinate bodies ====
- Central Fertilizer Quality Control and Training Institute
- Directorate of Arecanut and Spices Development (DSAD)
- Directorate of Cashewnut and Cocoa Development (DCCD)
- Directorate of Economics and Statistics (DES)
- Directorate of Jute Development
- Directorate of Marketing and Inspection (DMI)
- Directorate of Plant Protection, Quarantine, and Storage
- Directorate of Pulses Development
- Directorate of Rice Development
- KRISHI VISTAR-Directorate of Extension
- Mahalanobis National Crop Forecast Centre (NCFC)
- National Seed Research and Training Centre (NSRTC)
- North Eastern Farm Machinery Training and Testing Institute
- Northern Farm Machinery Training and Testing Institute
- Southern Region Farm Machinery Training and Testing Institute
- Soil and Land Use Survey of India

==== Commissions and committees ====
- Commission for Agricultural Costs and Prices (CACP)

==== Autonomous bodies ====
- Central Institute of Horticulture
- National Centre for Cold-chain Development (NCCD)
- National Rainfed Area Authority (NRAA).
- Small Farmers Agribusiness Consortium (SFAC)

==== Companies, societies, and boards ====
- Coconut Development Board
- National Bee Board (NBB)
- National Horticulture Board (NHB)
- National Seeds Corporation (NSC)

==== Additional units and offices ====
- Protection of Plant Varieties and Farmers Rights Authority
- Central Integrated Pest Management Centre (CIPMC)

=== Department of Agricultural Research and Education (DARE) ===
==== Autonomous bodies ====
- Central Farm Machinery Training and Testing Institute (FMTTI)
- Indian Council of Agricultural Research (ICAR)

==== Companies, societies, and boards ====
- Agrinnovate India

==== Additional units and offices ====
- Directorate of Oil Palm Research
- Directorate of Poultry Research (DPR)
- ICAR-Central Marine Fisheries Research Institute (CMFRI)
- ICAR-Agricultural Technology Application Research Institute
- Indian Institute of Horticultural Research (IIHR)
- Krishi Vigyan Kendra (KVK)

== Ministry of Ayush ==
=== Commissions and committees ===
- National Commission for Homoeopathy
- National Commission for Indian System of Medicine (NCISM)
- Pharmacopoeia Commission for Indian Medicine and Homoeopathy (PCIMH)

=== Autonomous bodies ===
- Central Council for Research in Ayurvedic Sciences (CCRAS)
- Central Council for Research in Homoeopathy (CCRH)
- Central Council for Research in Siddha (CCRS)
- Central Council for Research in Unani Medicine (CCRUM)
- Central Council for Research in Yoga and Naturopathy (CCRYN)
- Rashstriya Ayurveda Vidyapeeth

=== Companies, societies, and boards ===
- Indian Medicines Pharmaceutical Corporation Limited (IMPCL)

== Ministry of Chemicals and Fertilizers ==
=== Department of Chemicals and Petro-Chemicals ===
==== Companies, societies, and boards ====
- Hindustan Fluorocarbons Limited (HFL)
- Hindustan Insecticides Limited (HIL)
- Hindustan Organic Chemicals Limited (HOCL)
- Orissa Drugs and Chemicals Limited

=== Department of Fertilizers ===
==== Companies, societies, and boards ====
- Brahmaputra Valley Fertilizer Corporation Limited (BVFCL)
- FCI Aravali Gypsum and Minerals India Limited (FAGMIL)
- Fertilizer Corporation of India Limited (FCIL)
- Fertilizers and Chemicals Travancore Limited (FACT)
- Hindustan Fertilizer Corporation Limited (HFCL)
- Indian Farmers Fertilizer Cooperative Limited (IFFCO)
- Krishak Bharati Cooperative Limited (KRIBHCO)
- Madras Fertilizers Limited (MFL)
- National Fertilizers Limited (NFL)
- Projects and Development India Limited (PDIL)
- Ramagundam Fertilizers and Chemicals Limited (RFCL)
- Rashtriya Chemicals & Fertilizers Limited (RCF)
- Talcher Fertilizer Limited (TFL)

=== Department of Pharmaceuticals ===
==== Attached and subordinate bodies ====
- National Pharmaceutical Pricing Authority (NPPA)

==== Companies, societies, and boards ====
- Bengal Chemicals and Pharmaceuticals Limited (BCPL)
- Hindustan Antibiotics Limited (HAL)
- Indian Drugs and Pharmaceuticals Limited (IDPL)
- Karnataka Antibiotics and Pharmaceuticals Limited (KAPL)
- Bureau of Pharma PSUs of India (BPPI)

== Ministry of Civil Aviation ==
=== Attached and subordinate bodies ===
- Aircraft Accident Investigation Bureau (AAIB)
- Bureau of Civil Aviation Security (BCAS)
- Commission of Railway Safety (CRS)
- Directorate General of Civil Aviation (DGCA)

=== Companies, societies, and boards ===
- Air india Assets Holding Limited (AIAHL)
- Pawan Hans Limited (PHL)

=== Additional units and offices ===
- Airports Economic Regulatory Authority (AERA)
- Airports Authority of India (AAI)

== Ministry of Coal ==
=== Attached and subordinate bodies ===
- Coal Controller's Organization

=== Companies, societies, and boards ===
- Bharat Coking Coal Limited (BCCL)
- Central Coalfields Limited (CCL)
- Central Mine Planning and Design Institute Limited (CMPDI)
- Coal India Limited (CIL)
- Eastern Coalfields Limited (ECL)
- Mahanadi Coalfields Limited (MCL)
- NLC India Limited (NLCIL)
- Northern Coalfields Limited (NCL)
- Science and Technology Research in Coal and Lignite Sector
- Singareni Collieries Company Limited (SCCL)
- South Eastern Coalfields Limited (SECL)
- Western Coalfields Limited (WCL)

== Ministry of Commerce and Industry ==
=== Departments ===
- Department of Commerce
- Department for Promotion of Industry and Internal Trade

=== Attached Offices ===
- Directorate General of Foreign Trade (DGFT)
- Directorate General of Trade Remedies (DGTR)
- Directorate General of Supplies and Disposals (DGS&D)
- Office of the Economic Adviser
- Directorate General of Commercial Intelligence and Statistics (DGCI&S)
- Office of the Controller General of Patents, Designs and Trade Marks (CGPDTM)
  - Indian Patent Office
- Special Economic Zones
- Petroleum and Explosives Safety Organisation

=== Statutory Bodies ===
- Export Inspection Council (EIC)
- Export Inspection Agency-Delhi
- Export Inspection Agency-Kolkata
- Export Inspection Agency-Kochi
- Export Inspection Agency-Mumbai
- Export Inspection Agency-Chennai
- Export Inspection Agency-Kakinada
- Export

=== Autonomous Bodies ===
- Indian Institute of Foreign Trade (IIFT)
- Agricultural and Processed Food Products Export Development Authority (APEDA)
- Federation of Indian Export Organisations (FIEO)
- Intellectual Property Appellate Board (IPAB)
- National Accreditation Board for Testing and Calibration Laboratories (NABL)
- Quality Council of India (QCI)
  - National Institute of Design
  - Open Network for Digital Commerce
- Indian Institute of Packaging (IIP)
- Indian Institute of Plantation Management Bengaluru (IIPM B)
- Indian Rubber Manufacturers Research Association (IRMRA)
- Marine Products Export Development Authority (MPEDA)
- Indian Diamond Institute
- National Numbering Organisation (EAN-India)
- National Productivity Council (NPC)

=== Boards ===
- Tea Board
- Coffee Board
- Spices Board
- Rubber Board
- Tobacco Board

=== Commissions ===
- Tariff Commission

=== Export Promotion Councils ===
- EEPC India (Formerly, Engineering Export Promotion Council), largest export promotion council in India.
- Apparel Export Promotion Council (AEPC)
- Carpet Export Promotion Council (CEPC)
- Cotton Textile Export Promotion Council (TEXPROCIL)
- Export Promotion Council for Handicrafts (EPCH)
- Handloom Export Promotion Council (HEPC)
- Gem and Jewellery Export Promotion Council (GJEPC)
- Pharmaceutical Export Promotion Council (Pharmexcil)
- Cashew Export Promotion Council of India (CEPCI)
- Chemical and Allied Products Export Promotion Council (CAPEXIL)
- Basic Chemicals, Pharmaceuticals and Cosmetics Export Promotion Council (CHEMEXCIL)
- Council for Leather Exports
- National Manufacturing Competitiveness Council (NMCC)
- Plastics Export Promotion Council (PLEXCONCIL)
- Sports Goods Export Promotion Council (SGEPC)
- Project Exports Promotion Council of India (PEPC)

=== Public sector undertakings ===
- Export Credit Guarantee Corporation of India (ECGC)
- India Trade Promotion Organisation (ITPO)
- State Trading Corporation of India Limited (STCI)
- Minerals and Metals Trading Corporation of India (MMTC)
- National Centre for Trade Information (NCTI)

== Ministry of Communications ==
=== Department of Telecommunications ===
Regulatory Authority

- Telecom Regulatory Authority of India

Central Public Sector Undertakings

- Bharat Sanchar Nigam Limited
- Telecommunications Consultants India Limited
- ITI Limited

Autonomous Institutes

- National Communications Academy
- Institution of Electronics and Telecommunication Engineers

R&D Unit

- Centre for Development of Telematics

Specialised Units

- Telecom Engineering Center
- Controller of Communication Accounts
- Telecom Enforcement Resource and Monitoring (TERM) cells

=== Department of Posts ===
- India Posts
- Army Postal Service (India)

Training Institute

- Rafi Ahmed Kidwai National Postal Academy (RAKNPA), Ghaziabad

== Ministry of Consumer Affairs, Food and Public Distribution ==
=== Departments ===
==== Department of Consumer Affairs ====
- Bureau of Indian Standards (BIS)
- National Test House
- Consumer Online Resource and Empowerment Centre (CORE)
- National Consumer Disputes Redressal Commission (NCDRC)
- National Co-operative Consumers' Federation of India Limited (NCCF)

==== Department of Food and Public Distribution ====
- Food Corporation of India (statutory body)
- Central Warehousing Corporation (statutory body)
- Directorate of Sugar
- National Sugar Institute
- Directorate of Vanaspati, Vegetable Oils and Fats

== Ministry of Co-operation ==
- National Cooperative Development Corporation (NCDC) – Attached Office of Ministry

== Ministry of Corporate Affairs ==
- Registrar of Companies, India
- National Company Law Tribunal
- Competition Commission of India
- Serious Fraud Investigation Office (SFIO)
- Indian Institute of Corporate Affairs (IICA)

=== Statutory Bodies ===
- Institute of Company Secretaries of India
- Institute of Chartered Accountants of India
- Institute of Cost Accountants of India

== Ministry of Culture ==
=== Offices ===
- Anthropological Survey of India (AnSI)
- Archaeological Survey of India (ASI)
- Central Reference Library
- National Archives of India (NAI)
- National Library of India
- National Museum, New Delhi
- National Gallery of Modern Art, New Delhi
- National Gallery of Modern Art, Mumbai
- National Gallery of Modern Art, Bengaluru
- National Research Laboratory for Conservation of Cultural Property (NRLC)

=== Autonomous and other bodies ===
- Asiatic Society
- Central Institute of Higher Tibetan Studies (CIHTS)
- Centre for Cultural Resources and Training (CCRT)
- Gandhi Smriti and Darshan Samiti (GSDS)
- Indian Museum, Kolkata
- Indira Gandhi National Centre for the Arts (IGNCA)
- Kalakshetra Foundation, Chennai
- Khuda Bakhsh Oriental Public Library, Patna
- Maulana Abul Kalam Azad Institute of Asian Studies (MAKAIAS)
- National Council of Science Museums (NCSM)
- National Culture Fund
- National Electronic Register of Jain Manuscripts
- National Mission for Manuscripts
- National Museum Institute (NMI)
- National School of Drama
- Raja Rammohun Roy Library Foundation (RRRLF)
- Rampur Raza Library
- Sahitya Akademi
- Sangeet Natak Akademi
- Lalit Kala Akademi
- Victoria Memorial Hall, Kolkata
- Zonal Cultural Centres:
  - Eastern Zonal Cultural Centre
  - North Central Zone Cultural Centre
  - North East Zone Cultural Centre
  - North Zone Cultural Centre
  - South Central Zone Cultural Centre
  - South Zone Cultural Centre
  - West Zone Cultural Centre

== Ministry of Defence ==
=== Department of Defence Research and Development ===
- Defence Research and Development Organisation
- Aeronautical Development Agency
- Society for Integrated Circuit Technology and Applied Research

=== Department of Defence Production ===
- Ordnance Factory Board
- Directorate General of Quality Assurance (DGQA)
- Directorate General of Aeronautical Quality Assurance (DGAQA)
- Directorate of Standardisation
- Directorate of Planning & Coordination
- Defence Exhibition Organisation (DEO)

=== Department of Ex-Servicemen Welfare ===
- Directorate General of Resettlement (DGR)
- Kendriya Sainik Board (KSB)
- Air Force Naval Housing Board (AFNHB)
- Army Welfare Housing Organisation (AWHO)

=== Finance Division ===
- Controller General of Defence Accounts (CGDA)

=== Intelligence Agencies ===
- Defence Intelligence Agency
- Directorate of Air Intelligence
- Directorate of Military Intelligence
- Directorate of Naval Intelligence

=== Inter-Service Organisations ===
- Office of the Chief Administrative Officer
- Directorate General of Defence Estates
- Directorate General of Married Accommodation Project (DG MAP)
- Institute for Defence Studies and Analyses (IDSA)
- Military Engineer Services (MES)

== Ministry of Development of North Eastern Region ==
- North Eastern Development Finance Corporation Ltd. (NEDFi)
- North Eastern Regional Agricultural Marketing Corporation Limited (NERAMAC)
- The Sikkim Mining Corporation Limited. (SMC)
- North Eastern Handlooms and Handicrafts Development Corporation(NEHHDC)
- North East Cane and Bamboo Development Council

== Ministry of Earth Sciences ==
=== Executive Arm ===
- Earth System Science Organization(ESSO)

=== Subordinate Offices ===
- India Meteorological Department (IMD)
- National Centre for Medium Range Weather Forecasting (NCMRWF)

=== Attached Offices ===
- National Centre for Coastal Research (NCCR), Chennai
- Centre for Marine Living Resource and Ecology (CMLRE), Kochi
- National Centre for Seismology (NCS), Delhi

=== Autonomous Offices ===
- Indian Institute of Tropical Meteorology (IITM), Pune
- National Institute of Ocean Technology (NIOT), Chennai
- Indian National Centre for Ocean Information Services (INCOIS), Hyderabad
- National Centre for Polar and Ocean Research (NCPOR), Goa
- National Centre for Earth Science Studies(NCESS), Thiruvananthapuram

== Ministry of Education ==
- Department of School Education and Literacy
  - Central Board of Secondary Education (CBSE)
  - National Council of Educational Research and Training (NCERT)
  - Central Tibetan School Administration (CTSA)
  - Kendriya Vidyalaya Sangathan (KVS)
  - National Council for Teacher Education
  - National Foundation for Teachers' Welfare
  - Navodaya Vidyalaya Samiti (NVS)
  - National Open School Institute (NosI)
- Department Higher Education
- National Testing Agency

Organisational structure: The department is divided into eight bureaus, and most of the work of the department is handled through over 100 autonomous organisations under these bureaus.

- University and Higher Education; Minorities Education
  - University Grants Commission (UGC)
  - Education Research and Development Organisation (ERDO)
  - Indian Council of Social Science Research (ICSSR)
  - Indian Council of Historical Research (ICHR)
  - Indian Council of Philosophical Research (ICPR)
  - 46 Central Universities as on 11.09.2015, list issued by University Grants Commission
- Technical Education
  - All India Council of Technical Education (AICTE)
  - Council of Architecture (COA)
  - 25 Indian Institutes of Information Technology (IIITs) (Allahabad, Gwalior, Jabalpur, Kancheepuram and Kurnool)
  - 3 School of Planning and Architecture (SPAs)
  - 23 Indian Institutes of Technology (IITs)
  - 7 Indian Institutes of Science Education and Research (IISERs)
  - 20 Indian Institutes of Management (IIMs)
  - 31 National Institutes of Technology (NITs)
  - Indian Institute of Engineering Science and Technology, Shibpur (IIEST)
  - North Eastern Regional Institute of Science and Technology (NERIST)
  - National Institute of Industrial Engineering (NITIE)
  - 4 National Institutes of Technical Teachers' Training & Research (NITTTRs) (Bhopal, Chandigarh, Chennai and Kolkata)
  - 4 Regional Boards of Apprenticeship / Practical Training
- Administration and Languages
  - Three Deemed Universities in the field of Sanskrit, viz.
    - Rashtriya Sanskrit Sansthan (RSkS) in New Delhi,
    - Shri Lal Bahadur Shastri Rashtriya Sanskrit Vidyapeeth (SLBSRSV) New Delhi,
    - Rashtriya Sanskrit Vidyapeeth (RSV) Tirupati
  - Kendriya Hindi Sansthan (KHS), Agra
  - English and Foreign Language University (EFLU), Hyderabad
  - National Council for Promotion of Urdu Language (NCPUL)
  - National Council for Promotion of Sindhi Language (NCPSL)
  - Three subordinate offices: Central Hindi Directorate (CHD), New Delhi; Commission for Scientific & Technological Terminology (CSTT), New Delhi; and Central Institute of Indian Languages (CIIL), Mysore
- Distance Education and Scholarships
  - Indira Gandhi National Open University (IGNOU)
- UNESCO, International Cooperation, Book Promotion and Copyrights, Education Policy, Planning and Monitoring
- Integrated Finance Division.
- Statistics, Annual Plan and CMIS
- Administrative Reform, North Eastern Region, SC/ST/OBC

Others:

- National Institute of Educational Planning and Administration (NIEPA)
- National Book Trust (NBT)
- National Board of Accreditation (NBA)
- National Commission for Minority Educational Institutions (NCMEI)
- National Institute of Open Schooling (NIOS)
- District Institute of Education and Training

== Ministry of Electronics and Information Technology ==
=== Departments and Attached Offices ===
- National Informatics Centre (NIC)
- Standardisation, Testing and Quality Certification (STQC)

=== Statutory Bodies ===
- Unique Identification Authority of India(UIDAI)
- Controller of Certifying Authorities (CCA)
- Indian Computer Emergency Response Team (ICERT)

=== Autonomous Bodies ===
- Bhaskaracharya National Institute for Space Applications and Geo-informatics (BISAG-N)
- Centre for Development of Advanced Computing (C-DAC)
- National Institute of Electronics and Information Technology (NIELIT)
- Centre for Materials for Electronics Technology (C-MET)
- Education and Research Network (ERNET)
- Society for Applied Microwave Electronic Engineering and Research (SAMEER)
- Software Technology Parks of India (STPI)
- Semi-Conductor Lab (SCL)

== Ministry of Environment, Forest and Climate Change ==
=== Subordinate and statutory bodies ===
- Andaman & Nicobar Islands Forest and Plantation Development Corporation (Public sector undertaking)
- Animal Welfare Board of India
- Botanical Survey of India (BSI), Kolkata
- Central Pollution Control Board
- Central Zoo Authority, New Delhi
- Directorate of Forest Education (DFE), Dehradun
- Forest Survey of India (FSI), Dehradun
- Indira Gandhi National Forest Academy (IGNFA), Dehradun
- National Afforestation and Eco-Development Board
- National Biodiversity Authority, Chennai
- National Ganga River Basin Authority
- National Institute of Animal Welfare
- National Museum of Natural History (NMNH), New Delhi
- National Tiger Conservation Authority
- National Zoological Park (NZP), New Delhi
- Zoological Survey of India (ZSI), Kolkata

=== Autonomous bodies ===
- Govind Ballabh Pant Institute of Himalayan Environment and Development, Almora
- Indian Council of Forestry Research and Education (ICFRE), Dehradun
  - Arid Forest Research Institute
  - Forest Research Institute (India)
  - Himalayan Forest Research Institute
  - Institute of Forest Biodiversity
  - Institute of Forest Genetics and Tree Breeding
  - Institute of Forest Productivity
  - Institute of Wood Science and Technology
  - Rain Forest Research Institute
  - Tropical Forest Research Institute
  - Advanced Research Centre for Bamboo and Rattan
  - Centre for Forestry Research and Human Resource Development
  - Centre for Social Forestry and Eco-Rehabilitation
  - Centre for Forest Based Livelihood and Extension
- Indian Institute of Forest Management
- Indian Plywood Industries Training and Research Institute
- Wildlife Institute of India (WII)

== Ministry of External Affairs ==
- Foreign Service Institute
- Indian Council for Cultural Relations

== Ministry of Finance ==
=== Departments ===
- Indian Revenue Service
- Department of Disinvestment
- Department of Economic Affairs
- Department of Revenue
- Central Board of Indirect Taxes and Customs
- Central Economic Intelligence Bureau
- Directorate General of GST Intelligence
- Directorate General of Economic Enforcement
- Directorate of Revenue Intelligence
- Central Bureau of Narcotics
- Government Opium and Alkaloid Factories
- Central Board of Direct Taxes
- Income Tax Air Intelligence Unit
- Chief Commissioner of Income Tax Central
- Investigation Division of the Central Board of Direct Taxes
- National Academy of Direct Taxes
- Directorate General of Income Tax Investigation (for economic exchange related offences)
- Directorate of Income Tax Intelligence and Criminal Investigation (for criminal economic offences)

=== Autonomous Agencies ===
- Customs Excise and Service Tax Appellate Tribunal (CESTAT)
- Income Tax Appellate Tribunal (ITAT)
- National Institute of Public Finance and Policy
- National Institute of Financial Management
- Reserve Bank of India
- Securities and Exchange Board of India (SEBI)
  - Forward Markets Commission
- Insurance Regulatory and Development Authority
- Pension Fund Regulatory and Development Authority
- Insolvency and Bankruptcy Board of India
- National Institute of Securities Markets (NISM)

== Ministry of Fisheries, Animal Husbandry and Dairying ==
=== Departments ===
- Department of Animal Husbandry
- Department of Fisheries

=== Attached/subordinated offices ===
- Central Institute of Coastal Engineering for Fishery, Bangalore
- Centre of Excellence for Animal Husbandry
- Breed Improvement Institutes
- Central Poultry Development Organizations
- Central Sheep Breeding Farm
- Central Fodder Development Organizations
- Chaudhary Charan Singh National Institute of Animal Health, Baghpat
- Animal Quarantine & Certification Service Stations
- Delhi Milk Scheme

=== Boards ===
- National Fisheries Development Board
- National Dairy Development Board
- Animal Welfare Board of India

=== Others ===
- Coastal Aquaculture Authority
- Central Poultry Development Organization
- Veterinary Council of India

== Ministry of Food Processing Industries ==
- National Institute of Food Technology, Entrepreneurship and Management – Thanjavur
- National Institute of Food Technology Entrepreneurship and Management – Kundli

== Ministry of Health and Family Welfare ==
=== Department of Health ===
- National Medical Commission (NMC)
- Indian Nursing Council (INC)
- Dental Council of India (DCI)
- National Commission for Allied and Healthcare Profession (NCAHP)
- Pharmacy Council of India (PCI)
- National AIDS Control Organisation (NACO)
- All India Institute of Speech and Hearing (AIISH), Mysore
- All India Institute of Physical Medicine and Rehabilitation (AIIPMR), Mumbai
- Hospital Services Consultancy Corporation Limited (HSCC)
- All India Institute of hygiene and Public Health (AIIHPH), Kolkata

=== Department of Family Welfare ===
- National Institute of Health and Family Welfare (NIHFW), South Delhi
- International Institute for Population Sciences (IIPS), Mumbai
- Central Drug Research Institute (CDRI), Lucknow
- Indian Council of Medical Research (ICMR), New Delhi

=== Others ===
- Food Safety and Standards Authority of India (FSSAI)

== Ministry of Heavy Industries ==
- Department of Heavy Industries
  - Automotive Research Association of India (ARAI)
  - Bharat Heavy Electricals
  - Fluid Control Research Institute (FCRI)

== Ministry of Home Affairs ==
=== Departments ===
==== Department of Internal Security ====
- Indian Police Service
- Sardar Vallabhbhai Patel National Police Academy
- Intelligence Bureau
- National Investigation Agency (NIA)
- Narcotics Control Bureau
- National Civil Defence College
- Central Reserve Police Force
- Central Industrial Security Force
- National Security Guard
- Assam Rifles
- Rashtriya Rifles
- National Crime Records Bureau
- Bureau of Police Research and Development
- Department of Criminal Intelligence
- National Institute of Criminology and Forensic Sciences
- North Eastern Council
- North Eastern Police Academy
- Office of the Registrar General and Census Commissioner, Census of India

==== Department of Official Language ====
- Central Translation Bureau
- Central Hindi Training Institute

=== Central Armed Police Forces and Paramilitary forces ===
- Border Security Force
- Indo-Tibetan Border Police
- Sashastra Seema Bal
- Assam Rifles
- Central Reserve Police Force
- Central Industrial Security Force
- National Security Guard
- Defence Security Corps

=== Bureaus ===
- Bureau of Immigration, India
- Central Bureau of Investigation (CBI)
- Narcotics Control Bureau (NCB)
- Bureau of Police Research and Development, Libraries Network
- National Crime Records Bureau (NCRB)

=== Autonomous Bodies, Boards & Corporations ===
- National Foundation for Communal Harmony (NFCH)
- Repatriates Co-operative Finance and Development Bank Limited

=== Boards / Academies / Institutions (Grant in Aid) ===
- Regional Institute of Correctional Administration (RICA)
- Central Recordkeeping Agency (CRA) for the New Pension System (NPS), NSDL
- Scheduled Tribes and Other Traditional Forest Dwellers
- Welfare and Rehabilitation Board (WARB), New Delhi
- Rehabilitation Plantations Limited (RPL)
- National Securities Depository Limited (NSDL)
- National Institute of Disaster Management (NIDM)
- Centre for Disaster Management, LBSNAA, Mussoorie
- Officers Training Academy
- National Industrial Security Academy (NISA), CISF, Hyderabad

=== Regulatory Authorities ===
- National Disaster Management Authority NDMA

Commissions/Committees/Missions

- Committee for Consultations on the Situation in Andhra Pradesh (CCSAP)
- Committee of Parliament on Official Language

Councils

- Inter-State Council

== Ministry of Housing and Urban Affairs ==
- Building Materials and Technology Promotion Council (BMTPC)
- Central Government Employees Welfare Housing Organisation (CGEWHO)
- Delhi Development Authority (DDA)
- Hindustan Prefab Limited (HPL) (Public sector undertaking)
- Housing and Urban Development Corporation (HUDCO) (Public sector undertaking)
- National Buildings Organisation (NBO)
- National Cooperative Housing Federation of India (NCHFI)
- Principal Account Office (PAO)

== Ministry of Information and Broadcasting ==
- Directorate of Advertising and Visual Publicity
- Directorate of Field Publicity
- Directorate of Film Festivals
  - International Film Festival of India
- Prasar Bharati
  - All India Radio (AIR)
  - Doordarshan (DD)
- Central Board of Film Certification
- Film and Television Institute of India
- Film Certification Appellate Tribunal
- Indian Institute of Mass Communication (IIMC)
- National Film Archive of India (NFAI)
- Office of the Registrar of Newspapers for India (RNI)
- Press Council of India
- Press Information Bureau (PIB)
- Satyajit Ray Film and Television Institute
- Films Division
- Photo Division
- Publications Division
- Research Reference and Training Division
- Song and Drama Division
- Broadcast Engineering Consultants India Limited (Public sector undertaking)
- National Film Development Corporation (Public sector undertaking)

== Ministry of Labour and Employment ==
- Directorate General of Employment and Training (DGE&T)
  - Women Training Directorate
- Directorate General, Factory Advice Service and Labour Institutes (DGFASLI)
- Directorate General of Mines Safety (DGMS)
- Labour Bureau (labour statistics)
- Employees State Insurance Corporation (ESIC)
- Employees' Provident Fund Organisation
- Advanced Training Institute for Electronics and Process Instrumentation
- Advanced Training Institute, Mumbai
- Apprenticeship Training Scheme
- Craftsmen Training Scheme, Industrial training institute
- Foreman Training Institute, Bangalore
- V. V. Giri National Labour Institute
- Central board for workers education

== Ministry of Law and Justice ==
- Department of Justice
- Department of Legal Affairs
  - Law Commission of India
  - Appellate Tribunal for Foreign Exchange
  - Customs Excise and Service tax Appellate Tribunal (CESTAT)
  - Income Tax Appellate Tribunal (ITAT)
- Legislative Department
- First National Judicial Pay Commission

== Ministry of Micro, Small and Medium Enterprises ==
- Office of the Development Commissioner (MSME)
- Khadi & Village Industries Commission
- Coir Board
- National Small Industries Corporation
- National Institute of Micro, Small and Medium Enterprises (formerly the National Institute of Small Industry Extension Training)
- Indian Institute of Entrepreneurship

== Ministry of Mines ==
- Geological Survey of India (GSI)
- Indian Bureau of Mines
- National Institute of Rock Mechanics (NIRM)
- Jawaharlal Nehru Aluminium Research Development and Design Centre (JNARDDC)
- Hindustan Copper Limited (HCL)
- Mineral Exploration Corporation Limited (MECL)
- National Aluminium Company Limited (NALCO)

== Ministry of Minority Affairs ==
- Maulana Azad Education Foundation
- National Minorities Development and Finance Corporation (NMDFC)
- Central Wakf Council
- National Commission for Minorities (NCM)
- National Commissioner for Linguistic Minorities

== Ministry of New and Renewable Energy ==
Autonomous R&D Institution under MNRE

- Centre for Wind Energy Technology, (CWET) Chennai
- National Institute of Solar Energy (NISE), Gurgaon

PSUs / Joint Ventures

- Indian Renewable Energy Development Agency Limited (IREDA)
- Solar Energy Corporation of India Ltd (SECI)

== Ministry of Personnel, Public Grievances and Pensions ==
=== Department of Personnel and Training ===
- Civil Services Officers Institute (CSOI)
- Lal Bahadur Shastri National Academy of Administration (LBSNAA)
- Institute of Secretariat Training and Management (ISTM)
- Union Public Service Commission (UPSC)
- Staff Selection Commission (SSC)
- Public Enterprises Selection Board (PESB)
- Central Government Employees Consumer Cooperative Society Ltd. (Kendriya Bhandar)
- Central Bureau of Investigation. (CBI)

=== Department of Administrative Reforms and Public Grievances ===
The Department of Administrative Reforms and Public Grievances is to facilitate the pursuit of excellence in governance through the promotion of:

- Improvements in Government structures and processes
- Citizen-friendly initiatives including redressal of public grievances
- Documentation, incubation and dissemination of best practices
- Codification and simplification of procedures and
- Networking with various agencies

The department acts as a facilitator, in consultation with central ministries/departments, states/UT administrations, organisations and individuals, to improve government functioning through administrative reforms in the spheres of restructuring the government, process improvement, organisation and methods and grievance handling, and by promoting modernization, Citizen's Charters, award schemes, e-governance, and best practices.

It provides online grievance redress services through Centralized Public Grievance Redress and Monitoring System.

=== Department of Pension and Pensioners' Welfare ===
The department is mainly concerned with the formulation of policies regarding the post-retirement benefits of Central Government employees covered under the CCS (Pension) Rules, 1972. It also administers various welfare schemes for central government pensioners, i.e., redressal for Pensioners' grievances through CPENGRAM, an online pension sanction module for civil pensioners "Bhavishya", Sankalp, etc., under the umbrella of Pensioners' Portal. However, the pensioners of Ministries of Railways and Defence are governed by their respective pension rules.

== Ministry of Petroleum and Natural Gas ==
- Directorate General of Hydrocarbons
- Centre for High Technology
- Oil Industry Development Board
- Oil Industry Safety Directorate
- Petroleum Conservation Research Association
- Petroleum Planning and Analysis Cell
- Petroleum federation of India (Petrofed)

== Ministry of Planning ==
- NITI Aayog

== Ministry of Power ==
=== Bureaus ===
- Bureau of Energy Efficiency (BEE)

=== Autonomous bodies, boards and corporations ===
- Central Power Research Institute (CPRI), Bangalore, Karnataka
- National Power Training Institute (NPTI), Faridabad, Haryana

=== Statutory Bodies ===
- Damodar Valley Corporation (DVC)
- Bhakra Beas Management Board (BBMB)
- Central Electricity Authority (CEA)
- Central Electricity Regulatory Commission (CERC)
- Regional Inspectorial Organisation, Shillong

=== Commissions, committees and missions ===
- Northern Regional Power Committee (NRPC)
- Southern Regional Power Committee (SRPC)
- Western Regional Power Committee (WRPC)

== Ministry of Railways ==
- Railway Board
  - Indian Railways
    - 16 Zones
    - Research Design and Standards Organisation, Lucknow
    - Indian Railway Catering and Tourism Corporation (Public sector undertaking)
    - Konkan Railway Corporation (Public sector undertaking)
    - Mumbai Railway Vikas Corporation (Public sector undertaking)
    - Production Units
      - Banaras Locomotive Works
      - Chittaranjan Locomotive Works
      - Patiala Locomotive Works
      - Integral Coach Factory
      - Rail Coach Factory
      - Rail Wheel Factory
    - Maintenance Units
  - Bharat Wagon and Engineering Limited (Public sector undertaking)
  - Central Organisation for Modernisation of Workshops
  - Centre for Railway Information Systems (CRIS)
  - Central Organisation for Railway Electrification (CORE)
  - Container Corporation of India (Public sector undertaking)
  - Dedicated Freight Corridor Corporation of India (Public sector undertaking)
  - Indian Railway Finance Corporation (Public sector undertaking)
  - Ircon International (Public sector undertaking)
  - Rail Vikas Nigam (Public sector undertaking)
  - Railtel Corporation of India (Public sector undertaking)
  - Railway Protection Force
  - RITES Limited (Public sector undertaking)
- Rail Land Development Authority

== Ministry of Road Transport and Highways ==
=== Agencies ===
- National Highway Authority of India (NHAI)
- Indian Academy of Highway Engineers (IAHE)
- National Highways and Infrastructure Development Corporation Limited (NHIDCL)

== Ministry of Rural Development ==
- National Institute of Rural Development (NIRD)
- Department of Land Resources
- Department of Rural Development
- Department of Drinking Water Supply

== Ministry of Science and Technology ==
=== Department of Ocean Development ===
- National Centre for Antarctic and Ocean Research (NCAOR)

=== Department of Scientific & Industrial Research ===
- Council of Scientific and Industrial Research
- National Research Development Corporation
- Consultancy Development Centre
- Central Electronics Limited

=== Department of Science & Technology ===
- Agharkar Research Institute
- Aryabhatta Research Institute of Observational-Sciences
- Bose Institute
- Birbal Sahni Institute of Palaeobotany
- Centre for Nano and Soft Matter Sciences
- Indian Association for the Cultivation of Science
- Institute of Nano Science and Technology
- Indian Institute of Astrophysics
- Indian Institute of Geomagnetism
- International Advanced Research Centre for Powder Metallurgy and New Materials
- Jawaharlal Nehru Centre for Advanced Scientific Innovation
- National Innovation Foundation
- Raman Research Institute
- Sree Chitra Tirunal Institute for Medical Sciences and Technology
- S.N. Bose National Centre for Basic Sciences
- The Institute of Advanced Study in Science & Technology
- Technology Information, Forecasting and Assessment Council (TIFAC)
- North East Centre for Technology Application and Reach (NECTAR)
- Vigyan Prasar
- Wadia Institute of Himalayan Geology

== Ministry of Skill Development and Entrepreneurship ==
- National Institute of Entrepreneurship and Small Business Development (NIESBUD)
- National Skill Development Corporation (NSDC)
- Indian Institute of Entrepreneurship (IIE), Guwahati
- National council of vocational education and training (NCVET)
- National skill development agency (NSDA)

== Ministry of Social Justice and Empowerment ==
- Commissions
  - National Commission for Backward Classes
  - National Commission for Scheduled Castes
  - National Commission for Safai Karamcharis
- Other Statutory Bodies
  - Rehabilitation Council of India
  - Chief Commissioner for Persons with Disabilities
  - National Council for Transgender Persons
  - National Trust for the Welfare of Persons with Autism, Cerebral Palsy, Mental Retardation
- National Institutes
  - National Institute for the Empowerment of Persons with Visual Disabilities (NIEPVD), Dehradun
  - National Institute for the Empowerment of Persons with Intellectual Disabilities (NIEPID)
  - National Institute for Empowerment of Persons with Multiple Disabilities (NIEPMD)
  - Ali Yavar Jung National Institute for the Hearing Handicapped
  - Pt. Deendayal Upadhyaya Institute for the Physically Handicapped
  - National Institute of Mentally Handicapped
  - Swami Vivekananda National Institute of Rehabilitation Training and Research

== Ministry of Statistics and Programme Implementation ==
=== Departments ===
- Department of Statistics
- Department of Programme Implementation

=== Autonomous Bodies ===
- Central Statistical Office (CSO)
- National Sample Survey Office (NSSO)
- Indian Statistical Institute (ISI)

== Ministry of Steel ==
- Steel Authority of India Limited (SAIL)
- Rashtriya Ispat Nigam Limited (RINL)
- National Mineral Development Corporation (NMDC)

== Ministry of Textiles ==
=== Autonomous Bodies ===
- National Institute of Fashion Technology (NIFT)
- Sardar Vallabhbhai Patel Institute of Textile Management

=== Statutory Bodies ===
- Textiles Committee
- Central Silk Board, Bangalore

=== Textiles Research Associations ===
- Northern India Textile Research Association (NITRA)
- Ahmedabad Textile Industry's Research Association (ATIRA)
- Bombay Textile Research Association (BTRA)
- South India Textile Research Association (SITRA)
- Jute Industry's Research Association (IJIRA)
- Wool Research Association (WRA)
- The Synthetic & Art Silk Mills Research Association (SASMIRA)
- Man-made Textile Research Association (MANTRA)

=== Public Sector Undertakings ===
- British India Corporation Ltd. (BIC)
- Central Cottage Industries Corporation (CCIC)
- Cotton Corporation of India Ltd. (CCI)
- Handicrafts and Handlooms Export Corporation (HHEC)
- Jute Corporation of India Ltd. (JCI)
- National Handloom Development Corporation (NHDC)
- National Jute Manufacturers Corporation (NJMC)
- Birds Jute and Export Ltd. (BJEL)
- National Textile Corporation Ltd. (NTC)

== Ministry of Tribal Affairs ==
- National Commission for Scheduled Tribes (NCST)
- National Scheduled Tribes Finance and Development Corporation (NSTFDC)
- Tribal Co-operative Marketing Federation of India (TRIFED)
- National Education Society for Tribal Students

== Ministry of Women and Child Development ==
- National Institute of Public Cooperation and Child Development (NIPCCD)
- National Commission for Women (NCW)
- National Commission for Protection of Child Rights (NCPCR)
- Central Adoption Resource Authority (CARA)
- Central Social Welfare Board (CSWB)

Rashtriya Mahila Kosh (RMK)

== Ministry of Youth Affairs and Sports ==
=== Department of Sports ===
- National Sports Federation
- Sports Authority of India (SAI)
- Indian Olympic Association (IOA)
- Paralympic Committee of India
- National Anti-Doping Agency (NADA)
- Nehru Yuva Kendra Sangathan (NYKS)
- Services Sports Control Board
- Hockey India
- Board of Control for Cricket in India (BCCI)
- All India Football Federation (AIFF)
- Basketball Federation of India
- All India Tennis Association (AITA)
- Table Tennis Federation of India (TTFI)
- Badminton Association of India
- Volleyball Federation of India (VFI)
- Indian Weightlifting Federation
- Indian Powerlifting Federation
- Wrestling Federation of India (WFI)
- All India Boxing Association (AIBA)
- Indian Amateur Boxing Federation
- Judo Federation of India
- Wushu Association of India
- Swimming Federation of India
- Cycling Federation of India
- All India Chess Federation
- Tamil Nadu State Chess Association (TNSCA)
- All India Carrom Federation (AICF)
- Billiards & Snookers Federation of India
- Bridge Federation of India
- Equestrian Federation of India (EFI)
- Amateur Kabaddi Federation of India
- Kho-Kho Federation of India
- Ball Badminton Federation of India
- Amateur Baseball federation of India
- Indian Body Builders Federation
- Netball Federation of India
- Jump Rope Federation of India (JRFI)
- National Rifle Association of India (NRAI)
- Yachting Association of India

== Independent departments under the PMO (Prime Minister's Office) ==
=== Apex Board ===
- Atomic Energy Commission (AEC), Mumbai, Maharashtra

=== Regulatory Board and Organisation ===
- Atomic Energy Regulatory Board (AERB), Mumbai, Maharashtra is given some regulation powers by AEC.

=== Research & Development Sector ===
- Bhabha Atomic Research Centre (BARC), Mumbai, following Research institutions affiliated to BARC
- Atomic Minerals Directorate for Exploration and Research (AMD), Hyderabad
- Indira Gandhi Centre for Atomic Research (IGCAR), Kalpakkam, Tamil Nadu
- Raja Ramanna Centre for Advanced Technology (RRCAT), Indore
- Variable Energy Cyclotron Centre (VECC), Kolkata
- Global Centre for Nuclear Energy Partnership

=== Central Public Sector Units ===
- Electronics Corporation of India (ECIL), Hyderabad
- Indian Rare Earths Limited (IREL), Mumbai
- Uranium Corporation of India, Singhbhum
- Nuclear Power Corporation of India (NPCIL), Mumbai, Maharashtra
- Bharatiya Nabhkiya Vidyut Nigam Limited (BHAVINI), Kalpakkam, Tamil Nadu

=== Industrial Organisations ===
- Heavy Water Board (HWB), Mumbai
- Nuclear Fuel Complex (NFC), Hyderabad
- Board of Radiation & Isotope Technology (BRIT), Mumbai

=== Service Organisations ===
- Directorate of Construction, Services and Estate Management (DAE) (DCSEM), Mumbai
- Directorate of Purchase and Stores (DAE) (DPS), Mumbai
- General Services Organisation (DAE) (GSO), Kalpakkam

=== Universities ===
- Homi Bhabha National Institute, Mumbai
- Tata Institute of Fundamental Research, Mumbai
- Tata Institute of Fundamental Research, Hyderabad

=== Aided Sector ===
- National Institute of Science Education and Research, Bhubaneswar
- National Board for Higher Mathematics (NBHM), New Delhi
- Atomic Energy Education Society (AEES), Mumbai
- Tata Memorial Centre, Mumbai
- Centre for Excellence in Basic Sciences
- Saha Institute of Nuclear Physics (SINP), Kolkata
- Institute of Physics, Bhubaneswar
- Harish-Chandra Research Institute (HRI), Allahabad
- Institute of Mathematical Sciences (IMSc), Chennai
- Institute for Plasma Research, Gandhinagar

=== Department of Space ===
The Department of Space manages the following agencies and institutes:

- Indian Space Research Organisation (ISRO) – The primary research and development arm of the DoS.
  - Vikram Sarabhai Space Centre (VSSC), Thiruvananthapuram.
  - Liquid Propulsion Systems Centre (LPSC), Thiruvananthapuram.
  - Satish Dhawan Space Centre (SDSC-SHAR), Sriharikota.
  - ISRO Satellite Centre (ISAC), Bangalore.
  - Space Applications Centre (SAC), Ahmedabad.
  - National Remote Sensing Centre (NRSC), Hyderabad.
  - ISRO Inertial Systems Unit (IISU), Thiruvananthapuram.
  - Development and Educational Communication Unit (DECU), Ahmedabad.
  - Master Control Facility (MCF), Hassan.
  - ISRO Telemetry, Tracking and Command Network (ISTRAC), Bangalore.
  - Laboratory for Electro-Optics Systems (LEOS), Bangalore.
  - Indian Institute of Remote Sensing (IIRS), Dehradun.
- Antrix Corporation – The marketing arm of ISRO.
- Physical Research Laboratory (PRL), Ahmedabad.
- National Atmospheric Research Laboratory (NARL), Gadanki.
- North-Eastern Space Applications Centre (NE-SAC), Umiam.
- Semi-Conductor Laboratory (SCL), Mohali.
- Indian Institute of Space Science and Technology (IIST), Thiruvananthapuram – India's space university.
- New Space India Limited (NSIL), Bangalore.
- Indian National Space Promotion and Authorisation Centre (IN–SPACe)

== Independent agencies and bodies ==
- Comptroller and Auditor General of India (CAG)
- Central Information Commission
- Central Vigilance Commission (CVC)
- Election Commission of India
- Goods and Services Tax Council
- National Commission for Backward Classes (NCBC)
- National Commission for Scheduled Castes (NCSC)
- National Commission for Scheduled Tribes (NCST)
- National Commission for Minorities (NCM)
- National Commission on Population
- National Commission for Protection of Child Rights (NCPCR)
- National Commission for Women (NCW)
- National Human Rights Commission (NHRC)
- Reserve Bank of India (RBI)
- Securities Exchange Board of India (SEBI)
- Telecom Regulatory Authority of India (TRAI)
- Union Public Service Commission (UPSC)

== Intelligence ==
=== National ===
- Research and Analysis Wing (RAW) (External)
- Intelligence Bureau (IB) (Internal)
- National Investigation Agency (Internal/Counter-terrorism)
- Central Bureau of Investigation (CBI) (Internal/Criminal Investigation)
- Narcotics Control Bureau (NCB) (Internal/Criminal Investigation)

=== Economic ===
- Economic Intelligence Council
- Central Economic Intelligence Bureau
- Enforcement Directorate (ED)
- Central Bureau of Narcotics (CBN)
- Directorate General of Income Tax Investigation
- Financial Intelligence Unit (FIU)
- Directorate of Income Tax Intelligence and Criminal Investigation
- Directorate General of GST Intelligence
- Directorate of Revenue Intelligence (DRI)

=== Military ===
- Directorate of Military Intelligence
- Directorate of Air Intelligence
- Directorate of Naval Intelligence
- Defense Intelligence Agency

=== Other ===
- All-India Radio Monitoring Service (AIRMS)
- Joint Cipher Bureau

== Tribunals in India ==
- Appellate Tribunal for Electricity
- Appellate Tribunal under Smugglers and Foreign Exchange Manipulators Act
- Armed Forces Tribunal
- Central Administrative Tribunal
- Central Government Industrial Tribunal
- Customs, Excise and Service Tax Appellate Tribunal
- Debt Recovery Tribunal
- Income Tax Appellate Tribunal (ITAT)
- National Company Law Appellate Tribunal (NCLAT)
- National Company Law Tribunal (NCLT)
- National Green Tribunal (NGT)
- Railway Claims Tribunal
- Securities Appellate Tribunal
- Telecom Disputes Settlement and Appellate Tribunal (TDSAT)

== See also ==
- List of ministries and departments of the Government of India
- List of think tanks in India
- List of institutes funded by the government of India
- List of Indian intelligence agencies
- Union Council of Ministers
