= ATFE =

The acronym ATFE may reference these different entities:

- Association of Firearm and Tool Mark Examiners, an organization of forensic scientists (preferred acronym AFTE)
- Bureau of Alcohol, Tobacco, Firearms and Explosives, a US federal law enforcement agency (internally and colloquially known as ATF)
- Appellate Tribunal for Foreign Exchange, also known as the FEMA Tribunal, is the Indian Tribunal for violations of its Foreign Exchange Laws.
