= Tribunals in India =

Tribunals in India are quasi-judicial bodies for settling various administrative and tax-related disputes, including matters that are under the jurisdiction of Central Administrative Tribunal (CAT), Income Tax Appellate Tribunal (ITAT), Customs, Excise and Service Tax Appellate Tribunal (CESTAT), National Green Tribunal (NGT), and Securities Appellate Tribunal (SAT), among others.

Tribunals in India are governed by The Tribunals Reforms Act, 2021.

Armed Forces Tribunal (AFT) is a military tribunal in India. It was established under the Armed Forces Tribunal Act, 2007.

The National Company Law Tribunal is a quasi-judicial body in India that adjudicates issues relating to Indian companies.

National Company Law Appellate Tribunal (NCLAT) was constituted under Section 410 of the Companies Act, 2013 for hearing appeals against the orders of National Company Law Tribunal(s) (NCLT), with effect from 1 June 2016.

There are 14 tribunals in India, established or functioning under The Tribunals Reforms Act, 2021.

== Tribunals in India ==
Following are the tribunals in India.

Sl No	Tribunals
1	Appellate Tribunal for Electricity
2	Appellate Tribunal under Smugglers and Foreign Exchange Manipulators Act
3	Armed Forces Tribunal
4	Central Administrative Tribunal
5	Central Government Industrial Tribunal
6	Customs, Excise and Service Tax Appellate Tribunal
7	Debt Recovery Tribunal
8	Income Tax Appellate Tribunal (ITAT)
9	National Company Law Appellate Tribunal (NCLAT)
10	National Company Law Tribunal (NCLT)
11	National Green Tribunal (NGT)
12	Railway Claims Tribunal
13	Securities Appellate Tribunal
14	Telecom Disputes Settlement and Appellate Tribunal (TDSAT)

== Replaced and Dissolved Tribunals ==
Following is the list of tribunals dissolved and its replacements:

Sl No	Dissolved Tribunals	Replaced Tribunals
1	Competition Appellate Tribunal	National Company Law Appellate Tribunal
2	Airports Economic Regulatory Authority Appellate Tribunal	Telecom Disputes Settlement and Appellate Tribunal
3	Cyber Appellate Tribunal	Telecom Disputes Settlement and Appellate Tribunal
4	Copyright Board	Intellectual Property Appellate Board
5	National Highways Tribunal	Airport Appellate Tribunal
6	Employees Provident Fund Appellate Tribunal,	Central Government Industrial Tribunal

== Composition ==
The tribunals consist of the chairman, vice-chairman, and others whose terms of office are restricted to five years; they are eligible for reappointment after retirement.
