= Obeetee =

Indian carpet-maker

Obeetee Pvt Ltd
- Industry: Handmade Carpet Industry
- Founded: 1920
- Website: obeetee.in

Obeetee Pvt Ltd is an Indian hand-knotted carpet and hand-tufted carpet manufacturer founded in 1920, and is now India's largest carpet-maker. It is based primarily in Uttar Pradesh's Mirzapur district, within the so-called 'carpet belt' of India. The Carpet Belt of north India spreads west from the city of Allahabad, east through Bhadohi, and on to Varanasi along the banks of the Ganga River.

== History ==
The company was originally formed as a partnership firm under the names of its three founders: F. H. Oakley, F. H. Bowden, and Taylor. In 1932, this partnership was dissolved, and the new company was formed using the initials of the original founders (OBT) to create the name Obeetee.

Obeetee was the first hand-knotted carpet-maker to be permitted to use the Woolmark. The current chairman of the company is Rudra Chatterjee, who was preceded by Edward Oakley, the grandnephew of the F. H. Oakley who co-founded it.

The company claims to be reducing the use of child labor in the manufacturing of its carpets, and in the region as a whole. It implemented a 'no child labor' policy in the 1980s and funds the Carpet Export Promotion Council of India and the Children Emancipation Society to run education, health, training, and welfare programmes for children. The company has loom supervisors and inspectors in each of its twenty-five depots who are responsible for finding and reporting any children working.
