= Income Tax Air Intelligence Unit =

Law enforcement agency in India

Income Tax Air Intelligence Unit आयकर एयर इंटेलीजेंस यूनिट
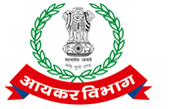

Jurisdictional structure
- Federal agency: India
- Operations jurisdiction: India
- Governing body: Government of India
- General nature: Federal law enforcement

Operational structure
- Headquarters: New Delhi, India
- Parent agency: Investigation Division of the Central Board of Direct Taxes

The Income Tax Air Intelligence Unit is a law enforcement agency, under the Ministry of Finance responsible for handling tax evasion and cross-border illegal trade in India in airports in consultation with the Central Board of Indirect Taxes and Customs and the CISF. It functions under the Zonal Deputy Director (Investigation) Income Tax under the superintendence of the Principal Director of Income Tax (Investigation). The agency functions under the rules prescribed by its parent organisation to handle any intimidation in course of their new duty of checking and gathering intelligence on tax evasion in airports.

== See also ==
- Indian Revenue Service
- Directorate General of Income Tax Investigation
- Directorate of Income Tax Intelligence and Criminal Investigation
- Directorate of Revenue Intelligence
- Central Economic Intelligence Bureau
