= M. A. Abdul Hakhim =

The Honourable Justice M. A. Abdul Hakhim

Judge of the Kerala High Court
- Incumbent
- Assumed office 22 March 2024
- Nominated by: D. Y. Chandrachud
- Appointed by: Droupadi Murmu

Personal details
- Born: 8 May 1969 (age 57) Kerala
- Education: L.L.M. (Mercantile Laws) Government Law College, Ernakulam
- Website: High Court of Kerala

Mullappally Abdul Aziz Abdul Hakhim is an Indian judge serving as a judge of Kerala High Court, the highest court in the Indian state of Kerala and in the Union Territory of Lakshadweep. He was elevated as judge from the bar while he was practicing as a lawyer in various courts in India.

== Early life and education ==
Abdul Hakhim completed his graduation in taxation law and master's in mercantile law from Government Law College, Ernakulam.

== Career ==
After completing law Hakhim enrolled as an advocate in Bar Council of Kerala in 1992 and started his practice in High Court of Kerala, Subordinate Courts and Tribunals in Ernakulam. He was also practicing in Supreme Court of India, Telecom Disputes Settlement and Appellate Tribunal, Debt Recovery Appellate Tribunal, National Green Tribunal, National Company Law Tribunal, Central Administrative Tribunal and Kerala Administrative Tribunal. On 22 March 2024, he was appointed as an additional judge of Kerala High Court and became permanent judge with effect from 04 March 2026.
