= Directorate of Plant Protection, Quarantine, and Storage =

Indian government agency

Agency overview
- Formed: 1946
- Preceding Agency: Department of Revenue and Agriculture, British Raj
- Jurisdiction: Government of India
- Headquarters: Old CGO Complex, NH IV, Faridabad
- Employees: 340
- Minister responsible: Plant Protection Adviser
- Agency executive: Dr. J. P. Singh, Plant Protection Adviser (PPA)
- Parent Division: Plant Protection Division
- Child agencies: Plant Quarantine; Plant Protection (IPM); Locust Control; National Plant Protection Training Institute Central IPM Centres; Central Insecticides Board & Registration Committee
- Key document: Woodhead Commission on the Bengal Famine
- Website: http://ppqs.gov.in/

The Directorate of Plant Protection, Quarantine, and Storage is an agency of the Plant Protection Division of the Department of Agriculture and Farmers Welfare, in the Ministry of Agriculture & Farmers' Welfare of the Government of India.
