= List of Export Promotion Organisations in India =

The following is a list of export promotion organisations in India. It includes statutory and non-statutory export promotion councils, commodity boards under the Ministry of Commerce and Industry (India), and export development authorities. These are non-profit organisations responsible for developing and promoting the export industry of India. Some of these bodies also perform regulatory and quality-control functions, the Directorate General of Foreign Trade lists 39 export promotion bodies on its website.

S.No.	Export promotion organisation	Year of Establishment	Abbreviation
1	Agricultural and Processed Food Products Export Development Authority	1986	APEDA
2	Apparel Export Promotion Council	1978	AEPC
3	Basic Chemicals, Cosmetics and Dyes Export Promotion Council	1963	CHEMEXCIL
4	Carpet Export Promotion Council	1982	CEPC
5	Cashew Export Promotion Council of India	1955	CEPCI
6	Chemicals and Allied Products Export Promotion Council	1958	CAPEXIL
7	Coffee Board	1942	-
8	Coir Board	1953	-
9	Council for Leather Exports	1984	CLE
10	Engineering Export Promotion Council of India	1955	EEPC
11	Export Promotion Council for Handicrafts	1986	EPCH
12	Gem and Jewellery Export Promotion Council	1966	GJEPC
13	Handloom Export Promotion Council	1965	HEPC
14	Indian Oil Seeds and Produce Export Promotion Council	1956	IOPEPC
15	Indian Silk Export Promotion Council	1983	ISEPC
16	Jute Products Development & Export Promotion Council		JPDEPC
17	Marine Products Export Development Authority	1972	MPEDA
18	Pharmaceutical Export Promotion Council		PHARMEXCIL
19	Rubber Board	1947	-
20	Power loom Development & Export Promotion council	1995	PDEXCIL
21	Project Exports Promotion Council of India	1984	PEPC
22	Services Export Promotion Council		SEPC
23	Shellac and Forest Products Export Promotion Council		SHEFEXIL
24	Spices Board	1987	-
25	Sports Goods Export Promotion Councill	1958	SGEPC
26	The Cotton Textiles Export Promotion Councill	1954	TEXPROCIL
27	The Plastics Export Promotion Councill	1955	PLEXCONCIL
28	The Man-made and Technical Textiles Export Promotion Council (formerly known as the Synthetic & Rayon Textiles Export Promotion Council)	1954	MATEXIL
29	Tea Board	1954	-
30	Tobacco Board	1975	-
31	Wool and Woolens Export Promotion Council	1964	WWEPC
32	Coconut Development Board	1981	
33	Mobile and Electronics Devices Export Promotion Council	2021	MEDEPC
34	Electronics and Computer Software Export Promotion Council		ESC
35	Export Promotion Council for EOUs and SEZs		EPCES
36	Federation of Indian Exports Organizations	1965	FIEO
37	Export Promotion Council for Medical Devices	2023	EPCMD
38	AYUSH Export Promotion Council	2022	AYUSHEXCIL
39	Telecom Equipment and Services Export Promotion Council		TEPC
