= National Commission for Safai Karamcharis =

Indian non-statutory body

The National Commission for Safai Karamcharis (NCSK) is currently a temporary non-statutory body that investigates the conditions of Safai Karamcharis (waste collectors) in India and makes recommendations to the Government of India.

NCSK was constituted 12 August 1994 as a statutory body for a three-year period under the NCSK ACT, 1993. It continued till February 2004, when the relevant Act expired. There between 1994 and 2004, it is a statutory body. Since 2004, NCSK has been revived several times, the last extension due to expire on 31 March 2022.

== Functions ==
NCSK studies, evaluates and monitors the implementation of various schemes for Safai Karamcharis as an autonomous organisation. It also provides redressal of their grievances.

NCSK functions include:

- recommending programmes to the Central Government to eliminate inequalities in status and facilities, and to promote opportunities for Safai Karamcharis
- studying and evaluating the implementation of the programmes and schemes for the social and economic rehabilitation of Safai Karamcharis.
  - Investigating specific grievances and take suo moto notice non-implementation of:
  - programmes or schemes in respect of any group of Safai Karamcharis;
  - decisions, guidelines or instructions, aimed at mitigating the hardship of Safai Karamcharis with measures for the social and economic upliftment of Safai Karamcharis;
  - the provisions of any law in its application to Safai Karamcharis;
  - take up such matters with the concerned authorities or with the Central or State Governments;
  - make periodical reports to the Central and State Governments

In the discharge of its functions, NCSK can demand information from any Government or local or other authority. Present Chair person is Manhar Valjibhai Zala.

== See also ==
- National Commission for Scheduled Castes
