= National Civil Defence College =

The National Civil Defence College,(abbreviated as NCDC) was formerly known as Central Emergency Relief Training Institute (CERTI), or NDRF training Institute which was founded on 29 April 1957 in Nagpur district of Maharashtra in India. It is the first disaster management training institute of the country. The conflicts of 1962 and 1965 compelled the Government of India to reorient its emergency training activities from natural disasters to those relating to protection of life and property, reducing damage and raising public morale during any war emergency. Hence, CERTI was renamed as National Civil Defence College on 1 April 1968.

This college is identified as a premier training establishment in Chemical Disasters by the Ministry of Environment, Forest and Climate Change of Government of India. It is also listed/cataloged in UNDHA centres of Disaster relief training.

== Courses ==
It conducts many courses for the Civil defence people ranging from earthquake disasters, cyclones, chemical disasters, industrial disasters, rail transport accidents, etc. Following are the main courses conducted by the college:

1. Civil Defence Instructors Course.
2. Flood / Cyclone Disaster Response Course.
3. earthquake Disaster Response Course.
4. Basic Life Support Course.
5. Training of Trainers in Radiological Emergencies.
6. Chemical Disaster First Responders Course.
7. Biological Incident First Responders Course.
8. Auxiliary Fire Fighting Course.
9. Advanced Search & Rescue Course.
10. Unexploded Bombs & Explosive Safety.
11. Incident Management & Command System Course.
12. Emergency Response to Rail Transport Accident
