= Association of Firearm and Tool Mark Examiners =

International non-profit organization

- Formation: 1969; 57 years ago
- Founded at: Chicago, Illinois
- Website: www.afte.org

The Association of Firearm and Tool Mark Examiners (AFTE) is an international non-profit organization dedicated to the advancement of firearm and tool mark identification, which is one of the forensic sciences.

== Organizational history ==
Prior to 1969, police and civilian firearm and tool mark examiners regularly met during annual meetings of the American Academy of Forensic Sciences (AAFS) to discuss concerns specific to their field.

In 1969, 35 examiners from the United States and Canada met at the Chicago Police Department Crime Laboratory and formed the Association of Firearm and Tool Mark Examiners. The first official Association publication was AFTE Newsletter Number 1, published on May 15, 1969. In 1972, the title of the publication was changed to AFTE Journal.

Each year since 1969, an Annual AFTE training seminar has been held at locations throughout the United States and Canada. The primary purpose of the annual seminars is to provide for the interchange of information as it relates to all aspects of the science of firearm and tool mark identification. The fifth anniversary training seminar in Washington, D.C. in 1974 was attended by 87 individuals, representing three countries. Five years later, the seminar in Milwaukee, Wisconsin, was attended by 149 examiners from seven countries.

In 1980, AFTE published the AFTE Glossary. It consisted of definitions and illustrations related to the field of firearm and tool mark identification, commonly used abbreviations, various formulas for determining bullet energy and rate of spin and useful chemical formulas. A second, more comprehensive edition was published in 1982 and a third edition of the glossary was published in 1994. This edition featured material from the first two editions with additional definitions and illustrations as well as new appendices which included definitions for computer terminology, fingernail examinations (a tool mark in a biological matrix), knives, machining terms, gunshot wound terminology and shooting scene reconstruction terminology.

In 1982, AFTE published an official training manual to be used as a modular guide for the training of firearm and tool mark examiners.

In 1989, AFTE hosted its 20th Anniversary Annual training seminar in Virginia Beach, VA. Some 210 individuals from twelve countries attended the seminar and in 1994 the training seminar in Indianapolis, Indiana was attended by over 300 individuals from 21 countries. The current membership of AFTE includes approximately 850 members, technical advisors and subscribers that represent over 40 countries from around the world.

In 2012, the AFTE Training Seminar held in Buffalo, New York had 388 attendees from 28 countries.

== Corporate structure ==
The AFTE is governed by a board of directors based on corporate bylaws and a code of ethics. Elections for board members are held annually in conjunction with a training seminar. The primary objectives of the members of the Association include:

- The exchange of information and developments
- Standardization of theory, practice and techniques
- Dissemination of information at annual training seminars through presentations involving the theory and practice of firearm and tool mark examination and its related subjects
- Publication of a journal covering the latest developments in firearm and tool mark examination.

Membership in the Association is limited to persons "of integrity" with suitable education, training and experience in the examination of firearms and/or tool marks. Membership levels include Provisional, Regular, Distinguished and Emeritus. Those levels range from non-voting trainees through those whose superior effort had furthered the work and purposes of the organization.

Honorary Membership may be conferred upon individuals in recognition of distinguished service to the Association or to the field of firearm and/or tool mark examination. Technical Advisor status is conferred to designated employees of manufacturers of products used or encountered in the investigation of firearm or tool mark evidence or specialists in closely related fields, whose area of expertise would be beneficial to the Association.

=== Publications ===
The official website of AFTE offers news, member and guest forums and member resources. The AFTE Journal, the quarterly, peer-reviewed publication of the organization, contains scholarly articles, case reports, technical reports and occasional reprints. The bylaws of the Association establish several standing committees with provisions for special, ad hoc or temporary committees as necessary or desirable. Included are Advisory, Board of Admissions, Bylaws, Certification, Editorial, Ethics, Historical, Research and Development, Scholarship, Standardization/Training, Technical Advisors as well as Website Committees.

=== Certification ===
AFTE administers a certification program to qualified members in any or all of three specific fields of Firearm Evidence Examination and Identification, Tool Mark Evidence Examination and Identification and/or Gunshot Residue Evidence Examination and Identification. Both written and practical examinations are required.

=== Research and development ===
The Research and Development Assistantship provides funding for approved projects that will result in the development of or improvements to investigative methods or techniques enhancing the quality of the discipline. Firearm identification is sometimes incorrectly referred to as ballistics.
