= Birds Jute and Export =

Ggb. Yg

Birds Jute and Export Limited (BJEL)
- Industry: Textiles
- Fate: Virtually inoperable since 2002
- Headquarters: Kolkata, West Bengal, India
- Products: Jute, Cotton, Viscose and Blended Fabric Decoratives
- Net income: ▼₹554 million (US$6.9 million) (fiscal 2006)
- Owner: National Jute Manufactures Corporation Limited
- Parent: Ministry of Textiles, Government of India

Birds Jute and Export Limited (BJEL) is a wholly owned subsidiary of the National Jute Manufactures Corporation Limited, Ministry of Textiles, Government of India. It is headquartered in Kolkata, West Bengal.

It manufactures jute, cotton, viscose and blended fabric decoratives. BJEL has experienced net losses over the past fiscal years and has been virtually inoperable since 2002.

The company is in the process of restructuring and experienced a net loss of ₹554 million (US$5.8 million) in fiscal 2006.

== History ==
Established on 30 June 1904, as the Lansdowne Jute Company Limited, Birds Jute & Exports Ltd. (BJEL) was formed to take over the jute goods manufacturing business from the Arathoon Jute Mills Limited at its Dakhindari mill. It was renamed as Birds Jute & Exports Ltd. on 15 December 1971.

== Closure ==
On 10 October 2018, the Union Cabinet convened in a meeting presided over by Prime Minister Narendra Modi. During this meeting, a decision was made to initiate the closure of the financially struggling National Jute Manufactures Corporation Limited (NJMC), including its subsidiary, Birds Jute and Exporters Ltd. (BJEL). NJMC had been grappling with persistent financial losses for a considerable period and had been under the purview of the Board for Industrial and Financial Reconstruction (BIFR) since 1993. Notably, the Mills associated with NJMC's operations, specifically the Kinnison Mill located in Titagarh, the Khardah Mill situated in Khardah, and the RBHM Mill situated in Katihar, had been placed under suspension since August 2016.
