= Handicrafts and Handlooms Export Corporation of India =

Handicrafts and Handlooms Export Corporation of India was an agency of Ministry of Textiles, Government of India established in 1958 with main objectives to undertake exports of handicrafts, handlooms products, khadi and products of village industries from India and to undertake special promotional measures.

On the 17th of March 2021, the Government of India approved the closure of Handicrafts and Handlooms Export Corporation of India.

== See also ==
- Khadi
- Khādī Development and Village Industries Commission (Khadi Gramodyog)
