= Central Government Industrial Tribunal =

Agency overview
- Jurisdiction: Government of India
- Headquarters: New Delhi
- Parent agency: Ministry of Law and Justice, Department of Legal Affairs
- Website: cgit.labour.gov.in

The Central Government Industrial Tribunal adjudicates issues specified in the Second Schedule or the Third Schedule of the Industrial Disputes Act, 1947. The jurisdiction of the Central Government Industrial Tribunal extends to whole of India. The Act applies for industrial disputes relating to workmen.

== History and objective ==
The central government and state governments can set up one or more Industrial Tribunals for settling cases in relation to matters of industrial disputes, by notification in the Official Gazette, for issues specified in the second or third schedule or any others relating to it.

There are 22 Central Government Industrial Tribunals across India.

== Powers of ==
Following are the powers of Central Government Industrial Tribunal.

i. Grant of Full and Complete Relief - Aggrieved party can be entitled full and complete relief by the court.

ii. Grant of Interim Relief - Court is granted inherent powers to grant to interim relief.

iii. Adjournment - If sufficient reasons are shown the court can adjourn cases.

iv. Enforcing Personal attendance - For deciding any issue before it the court can issue summons or proclamation and enforce attendance of any persons for deciding the same.

v. Examiner power - Any person can be examined under the oath as per the powers of Court.

vi. Compelling production of any document - For deciding any matter before it, the court can also compel the production of any object or documents relating to it.

vii. issuing Commissions - Labour courts for the purpose of examination of witnesses or documents, had been empowered with powers to issue commissions.

viii. Ex-part Proceedings - In case any party to the case fails to appear before it, the court has power to proceeding ex-parte.

ix. Resolving any other workmen grievance - The court can pass such order as it may feel just and proper after determining facts of each case after determining facts of each case for determining grievance of workmen.

== Challenges ==
Central Government Industrial Tribunal faces following changes:

Delay in judgements due to understaffing.

== See also ==
- Tribunals in India
