= National Fisheries Development Board building =

Fish-shaped building in Hyderabad, India

Coordinates: 17°20′30″N 78°25′14″E

National Fisheries Development Board
- నేషనల్ ఫిషరీస్ డెవలప్‌మెంట్ బోర్డ్ (Telugu); राष्ट्रीय मत्स्य विकास बोर्ड (Hindi)
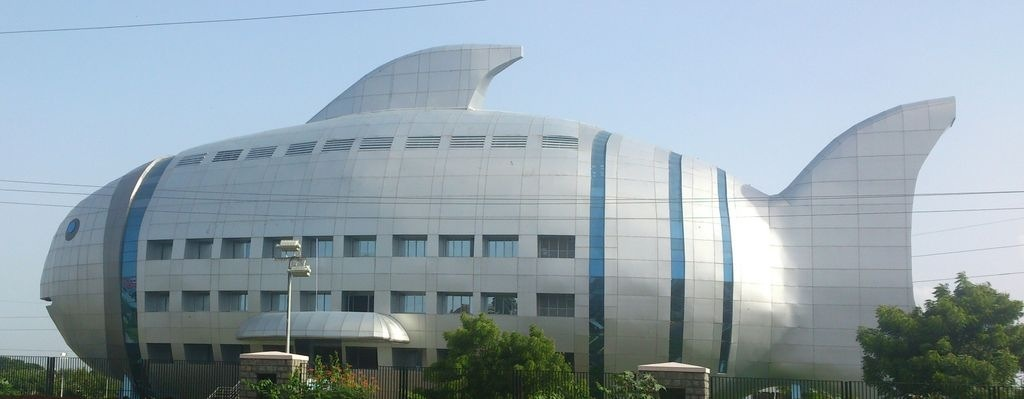
- National Fisheries Development Board building, 22 September 2012
- Interactive map of National Fisheries Development Board
- Location: Pillar No:235, Fish Building, PV Narasimha Rao Expressway, Hyderabad, Telangana 500052

History
- Built: 2012

Site notes
- Architect: Central Public Works Department of India
- Architectural style: Novelty

The National Fisheries Development Board building, located in Hyderabad, India, is the headquarters of the eponymous National Fisheries Development Board. The building is notable as a unique example of mimetic or novelty architecture, being designed in the shape of a gigantic fish.

The Building was designed and conceptualized by Central Public Works Department (CPWD).

The four-storey building was officially opened in April 2012, and was reportedly inspired by Frank Gehry's monumental 'Fish' sculpture in Olympic Village, Barcelona which was completed in 1992.

The building is an example of mimetic architecture, incorporating elements of the fish form into its functionality. This includes the left pectoral fin doubling as an awning above the staircase to the entrance, and the two circular windows acting as eyes.

The building is clad in stainless steel panels and, apart from the central core, is completely raised off the ground on pale blue pilotis. Blue-purple spotlights illuminate the building at night, giving the impression that the ‘giant fish’ is swimming through Hyderabad.
