= District Institute of Education and Training, Raebareli =

Location
- Doorbhash Nagar; Raebareli, Uttar Pradesh, 229001; India
- Coordinates: 26.230523°N 81.252868°E

Information
- Founded: 1991
- Sister school: All DIET of Uttar Pradesh
- Authority: SCERT, Uttar Pradesh
- Principal: Smt. Rekha Diwakar
- Language: Hindi
- Institution Magazine: Unnayan

District Institute of Education and Training, Raebareli or DIET Raebareli is a government educational institution under the nodal agency SCERT Uttar Pradesh, which provides academic and research support to elementary education in the Raebareli district. DIET serves as pre service and in service training institute for teachers in the district. Established in 1990, DIET aims to improve the Basic Education System and competence of teachers through regular training programs, projects, seminars, workshops and other academic programmes.

== Objectives ==
Establishment of DIET's in every district of India with the financial support from the Central Government is based on the recommendation of National Policy on Education 1986. DIET serves as the third tier of training and resource support structure at the district level after NCERT at national level and SCERT's at State level. The function of DIETs at the grassroots level in the area of elementary education can be synopsized under these three points.

- Training and orientation of heads of institution in institutional planning and management and micro level planning, along with providing advice and consultancy services.

== Establishment facilities ==
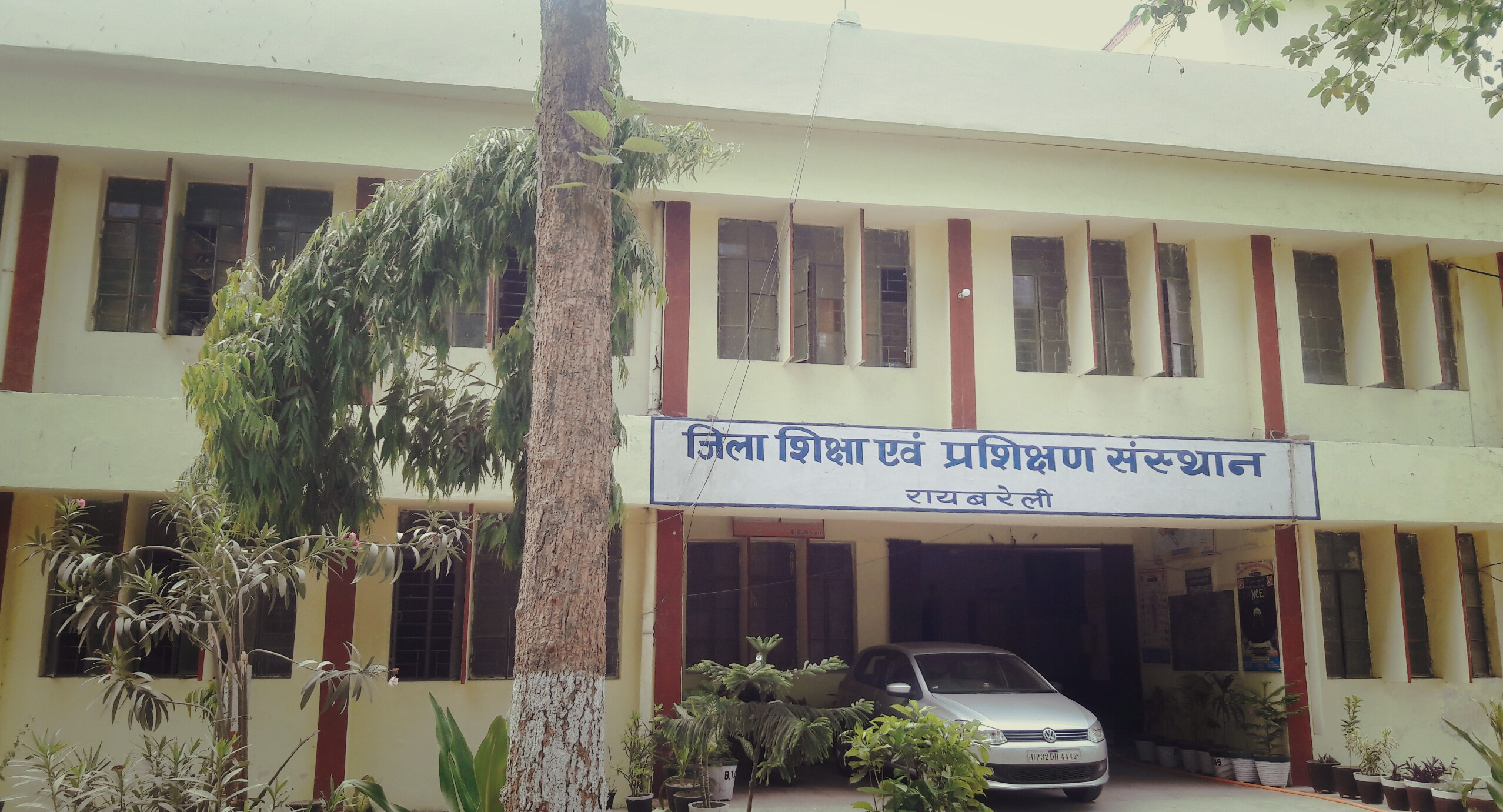
Academic Building DIET Raebareli

DIET Raebareli was established in the year 1990 following the UP Government Order 1763/15(30)/90 on 1990 September. The foundation stone of its present building was laid down by then Education Minister of Uttar Pradesh Rajnath Singh on October 3, 1991. The initial cost of construction of institution was 60 Lakhs INR. It is situated near to the National Highway NH 30 and is 81 km from Lucknow and 121 km from Allahabad. DIET Raebareli has one academic building along with two full residential hostels spread across 14 Acre of land. Its building is just opposite to Kendriya Vidyalaya Raebareli primary section building. The intake capacity of DIET Raebareli is 200 trainees every year for its regular pre service BTC program.

== Academic activities ==
In 2010 Digital Study Hall (DSH) began its intervention in the District Institutes for Education and Training (DIETs) of Uttar Pradesh with the aim of using innovative methods of teaching and enhancing the quality of elementary education by making the interaction between a student and a teacher more productive and effective. This intervention was launched through a program called "Capacity building of DIETs for enhancing teacher educators performance through mediation based pedagogy" in collaboration with SCERT Uttar Pradesh and UNICEF India. DIET Raebareli was one of the 12 DIETs initially covered under this intervention and was provided with the DVDs of DSH content i.e. videos illustrating various innovative ways of teaching children and getting their full attention. This was followed by monitoring visits in which DSH representatives came to DIET to monitor the progress and effectiveness of the program by getting firsthand information from staff and students and filling feedback forms.

A two-day event Classroom Culture Challenge Institute on 22–23 November 2016 was organised to demonstrate and discuss the strategies and principles to improve classroom practices and culture. Paryavaran Mitra is a nationwide initiative to provide youths and students from schools across the India with the necessary awareness, knowledge and motivation about the environment and sustainable development and utilising their potential and enthusiasm to meet the challenges of environmental sustainability and implement the strategies beneficial to all. DIET Raebareli is enrolled in this initiative and organises events and workshops to create awareness among the target group at regular interval.

== See also ==
- National Council for Teacher Education
- NCERT
- Sarva Shiksha Abhiyan
