= National Institute of Technical Teachers' Training and Research, Chennai =

Institute in India

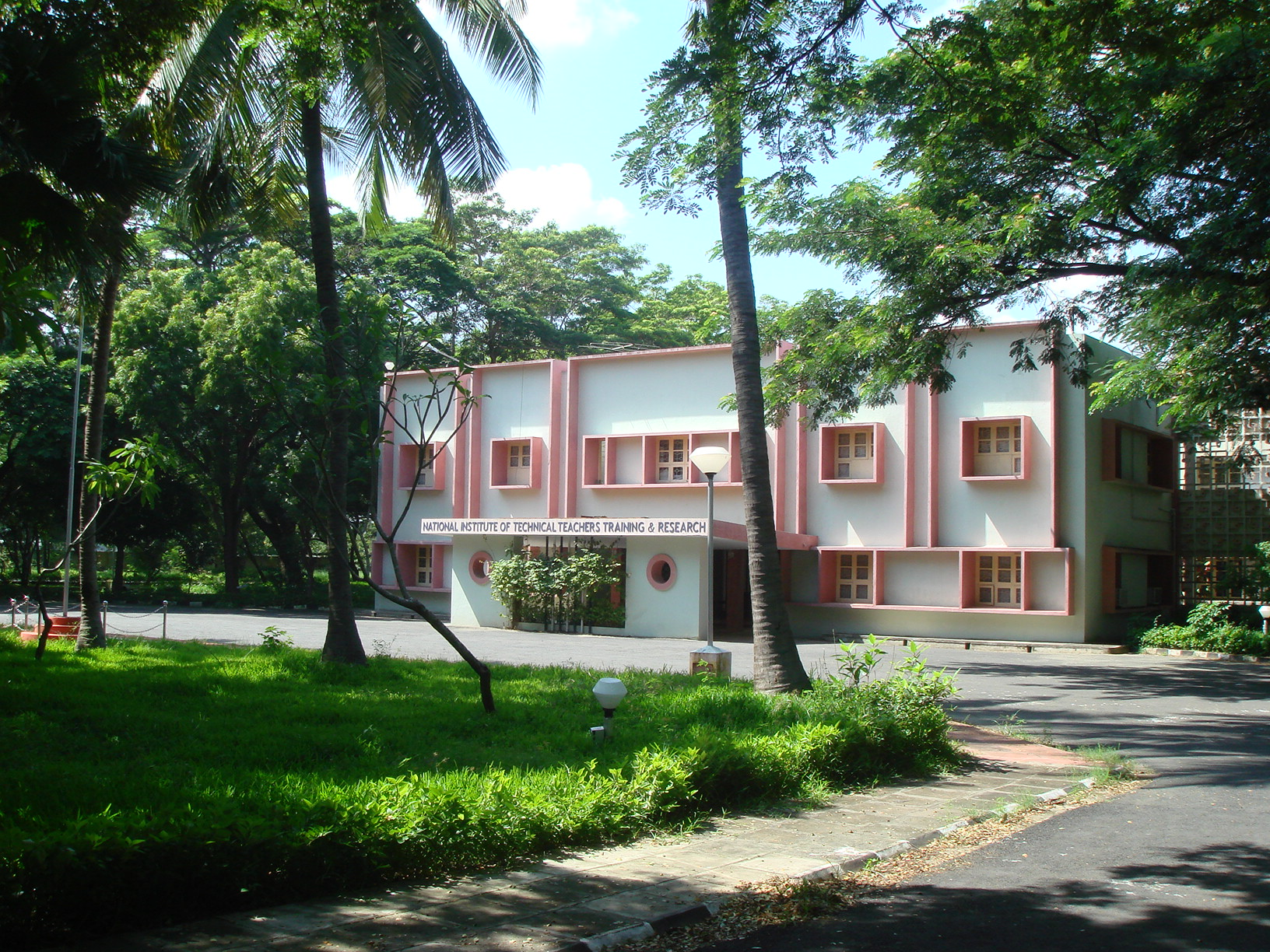
- Main building
- Other name: NITTTRc
- Motto in English: Providing Excellence in Technical Education
- Type: Public training institution
- Established: 1964; 62 years ago
- Budget: ₹40 crore (US$4.3 million) (2021–2022)
- Chairman: To be nomimated
- Director: Usha Natesan
- Academic staff: 27
- Postgraduates: 34
- Doctoral students: 24
- Location: Chennai, Tamil Nadu, 600113, India; 12.9873°N 80.2498°E
- Campus: Urban 25 acres (0.10 km^{2})
- Website: www.nitttrc.ac.in

National Institute of Technical Teachers' Training and Research, Chennai (NITTTR) is a deemed to be university under distinct category under the Ministry of Education (or MoE), Government of India. NITTTR Chennai is located in Tharamani in Chennai.

== History ==
The increase in intake in both Engineering and Polytechnic Institutions lead to increased faculty member recruitment. In order to provide In-service training to the various serving faculty members and Induction training to the newly recruited faculty members of the Technical Institutions, the Regional Institutes of Teacher Training (RITT) (now NITTTRs) were established by Government of India. In 1964 one of the four RITT was set up in Tharamani, Chennai. The RITT Chennai later became Technical Teachers Training Institute (TTTI). TTTIs became National Institutes and were known as National Institute of Technical Teachers' Training and Research in 2003. On 14 February 2022, the honorable Vice President of India Shri M.Venkaiah Naidu presided over as Chief Guest and inaugurated the Sports centre and NITTTR Open Educational Resources(OER).

== Campus ==
The Institute has two entrances. The main entrance of NITTTR Chennai is on is located on the six-lane Rajiv Gandhi Salai in Taramani opposite to the Thiruvanmiyur MRTS Railway Station and close to the Rajiv Gandhi Salai–Thiruvanmiyur West Avenue Junction, a high-density traffic junction used by about 30,000 vehicles a day. The campus is close to the TIDEL Park, an information technology (IT) park situated in the city of Chennai. Other entrance is located in Tharamani (Opposite to Spastics society of Tamil Nadu and International Tech Park, Chennai popularly known as Ascendas Tech Park).

The campus is located 10 km (6.2 mi) from the Chennai Airport, 15 km (9.3 mi) from the Chennai Central Railway station, and is well connected by city buses. Thiruvanmiyur is the nearest station on the Chennai MRTS line.

NITTTR Chennai has 4 Extension Centers situated in

- Bengaluru, Karnataka
- Kalamassery, Kerala
- Vijayawada, Andhra Pradesh
- Hyderabad, Telangana

Each center is well equipped and has been offering in-service training programmes for PAN India faculty members of Technical Institutions.

== Organisation and administration ==
=== Governance ===
The institute has a Board of Governors responsible for its administration and control.

==== Chairman ====
List of Chairman, Technical Teachers Training Institute (TTTI) (1967 -2003)
S.No	Name of the Chairman	Period
1	SHRI. G K CHANDRAMANI	1967- 1968
2	SHRI. L.S. CHANDRAKANT	1968 -1973
3	SHRI. H.S. SHAHANI	1973-1978
4	SHRI. V. R. DEENADAYALU	1978-1983
5	SHRI. A. L. MUDALIYAR	1983 - 1988
6	A. P. J. Abdul Kalam	1988 - 1992
7	SHRI. H S CHANDRASEKHARAIAH	1997 - 1999
8	SHRI. K.S RAJU	1999 - 2003

List of Chairman, NITTTR BoG
S.No	Name of the Chairman	Period
1	SHRI. K.S RAJU	2003 - 2009
2	S R K PRASAD	2009 - 2014
3	ALLAM APPA RAO	2014 - 2019
4	V.S.S KUMAR	2019 - 2024

==== Principals / Directors ====
List of Principals, TTTI
S.No	Name of the Principal	Period
1	A. P. JAMBULINGAM	1964-1977
2	M.A. NATARAJAN (IN-CHARGE)	1977- 1977
3	T. SUBBA RAO	1977-1992
4	M. NARAYANA RAO	1992 - 2001
5	S. EKAMBARAM (IN-CHARGE)	2001-2001
6	G . B JAIPRAKASH NARAIN	2001-2003

List of Directors, NITTTR
S.No	Name of the Director	Period
1	G . B JAIPRAKASH NARAIN	2003-2006
2	B . G. BARKI (IN-CHARGE)	2006-2009
3	S. MOHAN	2009 - 2014
4	S.DHANAPAL (IN-CHARGE)	2014 - 2016
5	SUDHINDRA NATH PANDA	2016 - 2021
6	USHA NATESAN	2021-

A.P.Jambulingam was the founder Principal of the Institute. The Director of the institute serves as the Chief Executive officer of the Institute. The first Director of NITTTR from 2003 to 2006 was G.B.Jaiprakash Narain, The Institute is presently headed by Usha Natesan the first female director of the Institute from inception.

== Departments and Centers ==
The Academic Council of the Institute decides the academic policy. It designs Training programmes, frames curriculum, and courses to be offered to the clientele.

The Institute has 9 Departments and 3 centers in the Tharamani campus at Chennai.

- Department of Civil and Environmental Engineering
- Department of Computer Science Engineering
- Department of Curriculum Development
- Department for Educational Media and Technology
- Department of Electrical and Electronics Engineering
- Department of Electronics and Communication Engineering
- Department of Education
- Department of Mechanical Engineering
- Center for Academic Studies and Research
- Center for International Affairs
- Department of Rural and Entrepreneurship Development
- Resource Centre

=== National Level Training Programmes ===
NITTTR Chennai conducts nearly 250 faculty development training programmes in areas related to pedagogy, Technology Enabled Learning, skill oriented, Industry supported, and other Engineering Disciplines every year. From 2022 onwards NITTTR Chennai is offering Professional Development Training programmes wherein working professionals and aspiring Teachers are permitted to attend the training programmes. On an average NITTTR Chennai trains around 7,500 trainees per year. NITTTR Chennai has also been offering customized training programmes for the faculty members of Engineering Colleges, Industry and Government Professionals.

=== Curriculum Development ===
NITTTR Chennai is playing a key role in designing curriculum for the clientele system.

=== International Training Programmes ===
NITTTR, Chennai has expanded its wings to overseas trainees too, incorporating technical teachers, researchers, administrative and HRD personnel, trainers and so on since 1982. The training courses for overseas professionals commenced with one such programme in 1982 and grown to the level, wherein, this prestigious institution organizes around eight such programmes per year, each of two months duration of intensive training, to achieve the set objectives in this sphere of the task.

In addition, special training programmes are also conducted for Bangladesh Civil Service professionals for three years. The Indian Technical and Economic Cooperation Programme are sponsored by Ministry of External Affairs, Govt. of India. The overseas alumni of India are spread across the world. Nearly 3,000 International trainees have been trained by NITTTR Chennai.

=== Post Graduate and Research degrees ===
NITTTR Chennai has achieved the status of a Deemed-to-be University under a distinct category as of 2024. The Institute now offers seven postgraduate programs in various engineering disciplines and a specialized MBA program in Business Analytics. Further, it provides three doctoral programs in the fields of Engineering, Engineering Education, and Management.

=== SWAYAM ===
SWAYAM(Study Webs of Active–Learning for Young Aspiring Minds) is a programme initiated by Government of India and designed to achieve the three cardinal principles of Education Policy viz., access, equity and quality platform facilitates hosting of all the courses, to be accessed by anyone, anywhere at any time. All the courses are interactive and free of cost to any learner. More than 1,000 specially chosen teachers from across the country have participated in preparing these courses.

The courses hosted on SWAYAM are in 4 quadrants – (1) video lecture, (2) specially prepared reading material that can be downloaded/printed (3) self-assessment tests through tests and quizzes and (4) an online discussion forum for clearing the doubts. Steps have been taken to enrich the learning experience by using multi-media and state of the art pedagogy / technology.

There are nine National Coordinators for SWAYAM and NITTTR Chennai is the National Coordinator for Teacher Training programme. In so far through 138 completed courses developed by NITTTR Chennai and three other coordinating Institutes nearly 5,698 teachers have successfully completed the courses.

=== ARPIT ===
The Ministry of Human Resource Department (MHRD) launched online Annual Refresher Programme in Teaching (ARPIT) on 13 November 2018. The program is a major initiative for the development of a 1.5 million higher education faculty using the MOOCs platform SWAYAM. To implement ARPIT, 75 discipline-specific institutions have been identified and notified as National Resource Centres (NRCs). NRCs prepare online training material with focus on latest developments in a discipline, new & emerging trends, pedagogical improvements and methodologies for teaching the revised curriculum.The training materials are uploaded and made available through SWAYAM. Each NRC also publishes the list of the faculty who have been certified. NRCs are located across a range of institutions such as Central Universities, IISc, IUCAA, IITs, IISERs, NITs, NITTTRs and State Universities. For example, NITTTR Chennai is one of the aforementioned National Resource Centers.

=== NITTTR ===
National Initiative for Technical Teachers Training (NITTT) is a Scheme initiated by AICTE and MoE to provide training for teachers working in AICTE-approved technical institutions. An Inductee Teacher has to undergo online training of eight modules in the first phase of training. The Stage – 1 training is being conducted in MOOCs mode for eight modules on the Online Degree SWAYAM platform through the NITTT portal followed by a mentor-based training and one-month industrial training. AICTE has entrusted NITTTR Chennai as the coordinating institute to implement the training program. National Testing Agency (NTA) has been assigned to conduct the final summative Assessment for the registered participants. The mode of Examination is Online Based Test - Remote Proctored (OBT - RP) Examination where the examinee can write the exam from their own location such as home or office (instead of visiting an Examination Centre).

=== Community Development Through Polytechnics (CDTP) Scheme ===
The CDTP scheme was started in 2009 and funded by Ministry of Education till 2017. The scheme is currently under Ministry of Skill Development and Entrepreneurship. NITTTR Chennai is the monitoring agency of the scheme implemented through the Southern Region Polytechnics.

The main objectives of the scheme are:

- Carry out Need Assessment Surveys to assess the technology and training needs;
- Impart Skill Development Training to the intended target groups;
- Disseminate Appropriate Technologies for productivity enhancement;
- Provide Technical and Support Services to rural masses and slums dwellers;
- Create Awareness among the target groups about technological advancement and contemporary issues of importance.

NITTTR Chennai monitors the activities of 190 CDTP scheme Institutions along with the respective State Directorates of Technical Education.

== Notable alumni ==
- Chef Damodharan
- Sekar Viswanathan
