= Tribunals Reforms Act, 2021 =

Act of the Parliament of India

Tribunal Reforms Act, 2021

Parliament of India
- Territorial extent: India

Struck down by
- Supreme Court of India
- Status: Struck down

The Tribunal Reforms Act, 2021 is an Act of Parliament of India. This law was enacted with the objective of reforming the tribunals in India.

Tribunals in India proved to be a big game changer for the fast delivery of justice in the country, although many points have challenged in courts and the provisions have been struck down by the Supreme Court. In order to develop them more, the Tribunals Reforms Act, 2021 was passed by the Government of India. In total there are 35 Sections in the Tribunal Reforms Act, 2021. Many suggestions of the previous Law Commission were incorporated.

On November 19 of 2025, the Supreme Court struck down key provisions of the Tribunal Reforms Act, 2021 because it gave excessive executive control over tribunal appointments (for example, in the Search cum Selection Committee member appointments, dependence for funds and infrastructure on ministries), tenure, and service conditions, violating the constitutional principles of judicial functional independence, financial autonomy and separation of powers. The Court found that Parliament had simply repackaged provisions from the previously invalidated 2021 Tribunal Ordinance without addressing the constitutional defects, effectively attempting to override binding Supreme Court judgments. The invalidated provisions included allowing the government to equate tribunal members with civil servants, enabling arbitrary curtailment of tenure, and maintaining executive dominance in appointments despite the government being the largest litigant before tribunals. Also the minimum age of members as 50 years was arbitrary. The Supreme Court directed the Centre to establish a National Tribunal Commission within four months as an essential structural safeguard to ensure independence, transparency, and uniformity in tribunal functioning, appointments, and administration. Chief Justice Gavai emphasized that Parliament must respect settled constitutional law and remedy identified defects rather than merely reenacting invalidated provisions in different forms (since the Tribunal Rules 2020 and then the Tribunal Reforms (Rationalisation and Conditions of Service) Ordinance 2021 had already been declared unconstitutional by the Court).

Key provisions:

- Several appellate tribunals have been abolished; their cases shifted to High Courts/other judicial bodies.
- Designation of chairman and vice chairman has been made uniform across all tribunals.
- A Search-cum-Selection Committee recommends appointments to tribunals.
- Tenure fixed at 4 years; minimum age for appointment is 50. Upper age limit: 67 (members) and 70 (chairpersons), or completion of 4-year term.
- Reappointment allowed, with weightage to past service.
- Removal of chairperson/members by Central Government based on Committee’s recommendation.
