= Andaman and Nicobar Islands Forest and Plantation Development Corporation =

Andaman and Nicobar Islands Forest and Plantation Development Corporation Limited
- Company type: Public Sector Undertaking
- Founded: 1977
- Headquarters: Port Blair, Andaman and Nicobar Islands
- Owner: Government of India
- Website: Official website

Andaman and Nicobar Islands Forest and Plantation Development Corporation Limited (ANIFPDCL, 1977-2017) was a public sector undertaking of the Government of India, operating in the Andaman and Nicobar Islands. The corporation was responsible for providing and managing forestry resources in the union territories.

== History ==
The government-owned company was established in 1977 and was headquartered in Port Blair. The economy of the islands was considered to be dependent on the development of industries based on tropical rainforests.

ANIFPDCL was primarily involved in the harvesting and regeneration of forests. Logging was based on sustained yield principles, and minimizing disturbances to the island rain forest ecosystem and using a natural regeneration technique known as the Andaman Canopy Lifting Shelterwood System.

It also managed red oil palm and rubber plantations on the islands.

Since 2001, the ANIFPDCL has been an overall loss-making company. That resulted in its not being able to pay salaries and wages to its employees.

In August 2017, the Indian Cabinet gave final approval to the Ministry of Environment, Forest and Climate Change to close the Andaman and Nicobar Islands Forest and Plantation Development Corporation.

== See also ==
- Forest administration in India
