= Army Welfare Housing Organisation =

Government agency in India

Army Welfare Housing Organization
- Company type: Private
- Industry: Construction
- Headquarters: India
- Area served: India
- Parent: Indian Army
- Website: www.awhosena.in

Army Welfare Housing Organisation is a society formed in December 1978 under the Indian Societies Registration Act XXI of 1860. The aim and objective of the Organisation is to construct houses for serving/retired Army personnel and their widows in selected stations throughout the country. Adjutant-General of the Indian Army is the ex-officio chairman of AWHO and the board of governors is entirely constituted of senior army officers. The Organisation claims to function on 'No Profit No Loss' basis but that has been disputed. In 2012, Defence Minister A K Antony ordered an internal probe into alleged irregularities in AWHO projects across India. One project under scrutiny was a 43-villa development at Yelahanka, Bangalore, where allottees alleged that the price per house was raised from an initial Rs 15.5 lakh to Rs 52 lakh just before project completion in 2009, representing a more than threefold increase. Residents also alleged that the quality of construction was inferior to what had been promised, with complaints including substandard sewer line gradients causing sewage stagnation. The Deccan Herald reported that allottees were charged an extra Rs 20 lakh per house above the revised price. Serving/Veteran allottees of some projects have dragged the organization into the Court due to non-following the directions of Authorities of the state where the project is situated, delay in handing over and inferior construction.

== Developments ==
AWHO has served many housing societies in various cities in India they include:

AWHO Colony, located in Gunrock Enclave (Karkhana, Secunderabad - 500009), is in Hyderabad. It features ready-to-move apartments and houses, making it a highly sought-after, peaceful area for military families and civilians.

== Demand Surveys ==
AWHO conducts demand surveys to determine demand for a housing project at a certain location. Applicants are requested for Rs. 10,000/- to register into the demand survey scheme. There is no interest provided for this money. If an applicant wants to withdraw later, he gets the original amount minus 2%. Quite often demand surveys run for a long while without resulting in any actual housing project starting up. There are also several demand surveys which are discarded later citing lack of demand or inability to acquire land.
