= Gem and Jewellery Export Promotion Council =

Indian gem and jewelry industry council

The Gem & Jewellery Export Promotion Council
- GJEPC

Agency overview
- Formed: 1966
- Jurisdiction: Government of India
- Headquarters: Mumbai, India; 19.072635°N 72.871157°E
- Minister responsible: Piyush Goyal, Minister of Commerce
- Agency executive: Mr. Kirit Bhansali Chairman, GJEPC
- Parent agency: Department of Commerce, Government of India

The Gem & Jewellery Export Promotion Council (GJEPC) is the apex body for India's gem and jewellery industry, established in 1966 by the Ministry of Commerce, Government of India. With over 10,700 members, GJEPC has been autonomous since 1998. As a trade facilitator entrusted to build a robust and business-friendly operating environment, it plays a key role in promoting exports, shaping policy, and supporting industry growth through trade events, training, and development initiatives.

== History ==
The GJEPC was established in 1966 by the Ministry of Commerce and Industry (India), it was one of several Export Promotion Councils started by the Government. It has its headquarters in Mumbai and Regional Offices in New Delhi, Kolkata, Chennai, Surat and Jaipur. The GJEPC was granted an autonomous status in 1998, it is the apex body for the gems and jewellery industry of India and represents almost 7,000 exporters. The Council presents issues to the Government and recommends policy intervention.

== Common Facility Centre (CFC) ==
The GJEPC has set up CFCs in Amreli, Visnagar, Palanpur and Junagadh in Gujarat. The CFC Services include planning, laser sawing and cutting facilities to process diamonds.

== Awards ==
The GJEPC organises the premier jewellery design competition and Awards. It celebrates art, creativity and innovation by honouring the talents in jewellery design.

== Seminars ==
The GJEPC holds the Design Inspirations seminar in Mumbai in February each year. Design Inspirations is an initiative to educate jewellers, designers and students about the upcoming trends in the gems and jewellery sector in India, Europe and the US. It gives in-depth insights into consumer behaviour patterns, aspirations, desires, emotions, feelings; and how to translate them into thematic concepts and visual directions.

== Education and Research ==
There are seven educational institutes across five cities, and four gemological laboratories under the GJEPC.

- Indian Institute of Gems & Jewellery (IIGJ): They include Indian Institute of Gems & Jewellery in Mumbai, Jaipur, Delhi, Varanasi and Udupi along with the Indian Diamond Institute in Surat.
- Gemmological Institute of India (GII), Mumbai: The institute was established in 1971, the GII is a centre for gemological, training services, Research and Development work.
- Gem Testing Laboratory, Jaipur: This is a coloured gemstone centre in Jaipur. It grades and certifies all kinds of stones, its speciality is in coloured gemstones.
- Indian Gemological Institute, New Delhi: The Institute is located in New Delhi, IGI serves the gem testing and certification requirements of the industry in North India.

== See also ==
- Indian Diamond Institute
- Ministry of Commerce and Industry (India)
