= National Jute Manufactures Corporation Limited =

- Type: Central Public Sector Undertaking
- Industry: Textile industry
- Founded: Kolkata, India (3 June 1980)
- Founder: Government of India
- Headquarters: Kolkata, India
- Area served: Worldwide
- Key people: Mr. Kushal Bhaduri (CMD)
- Revenue: ▲₹600.00 crore (US$62 million)
- Subsidiaries: Birds Jute and Export
- Website: njmc.org.in

National Jute Manufacturers Corporation Ltd.(NJMC) is a central public sector undertaking under the ownership of the Ministry of Textiles, Government of India. It is headquartered in Kolkata, West Bengal. It was incorporated under the Companies Act, 1956 with an objective to takeo ver six jute mills, the management of which was earlier taken over by the Government of India under the Industries (Development and Regulation) Act, 1951. At present NJMC is engaged in manufacturing of jute goods through its three running units, two units located at North North 24 Paragnas in West Bengal and one unit located at Katihar in Bihar. It has one subsidiary namely Birds Jute and Export Limited.

== History ==
The company formed through the nationalization of six jute mills, namely, Kinnison, Khardah, National, Alexandra, union, all in the state of West Bengal and RBHM Katihar in Bihar in 1980 is under the administrative control of Ministry of Textiles.

== Mills under NJMC ==
The company formed through the nationalization of six jute mills, namely, Kinnison, Khardah, National, Alexandra, union, all in the state of West Bengal and RBHM Katihar in Bihar in 1980 is under the administrative control of Ministry of Textiles.

The 6 mills under the NJMC are as follows:

Name of the Company	Status
National Company Limited	Closed
Alexandra Jute Mills Limited	Closed
Union Jute Company Limited	Closed
Khardah Company Limited	Closed
The Kinnison Jute Mills Company Limited	Closed
RBHM Jute Mills Private Limited	Closed

== Products ==
Jute products are diverse, from gunny bags to home decor. Some examples include, B Twill sacking cloth, water repellent geo-textiles, floor mats, carpets, Tiffin Bag, Bottle Bag, Ring Bag, 3 Fold Purse etc.

== Financial losses and restructuring ==
Due to financial losses the company was referred to the BIFR in August 1992. On 19 March 2010, the Cabinet finally approved the revival of NJMC Ltd. and on 31 March 2011, BIFR approved the revival scheme of NJMC Ltd.

The implementation of the revival scheme was supported by resuming operation in RBHM unit in January 2011 and was followed by re-opening of Kinnison and Khardah mills in September 2011.

The Company has taken many new initiatives including Adoption & Implementation of Modernization Scheme, Implementation of Innovation Scheme like Baxterisation of Spinning Frames, Introduction of Production contracts in place of labour contracts, Procurement of Modern Machinery like Spreaders, 4 ¾ inch SD Spinning Frames. All the three operating Mills have restarted production.

In Aug 2013, decision was taken to select Transaction Advisor for conceptualizing the alternative plan for utilization of surplus land of NJMC Limited. NJMC is looking for its diversification of Jute Products in light of the global consensus in green revolution & eco-friendly products.

== Closure ==
The Union Cabinet, at a meeting held on 10 October 2018, chaired by Prime Minister Narendra Modi, gave the green signal for the closure of National Jute Manufacturers Corporation Ltd. (NJMC) along with its subsidiary Birds Jute and Exporters Ltd. (BJEL). NJMC had been incurring losses for several years and was under reference to BIFR since 1993. The Mills of NJMC which were proposed for revival, namely, Kinnison Mill at Titagarh, Khardah Mill at Khardah and RBHM Mill at Katihar were under suspension since August, 2016.
