= Chemical and Allied Export Promotion Council =

Chemical and Allied Export Promotion Council (CAPEXIL), a non-profit making organization, was set up in March 1958 by the Ministry of Commerce, Government of India to promote export of Chemical and Allied Products from India. With the headquarter at Kolkata, and regional offices at New Delhi, Mumbai, Kolkata and Chennai, CAPEXIL has more than 3500 members across the country.
