= Debt Recovery Tribunal =

Indian quasi-judicial body

Debt Recovery Tribunal is a quasi-judicial body formed under the Recovery of Debts Due to Banks and Financial Institutions (RDDBFI) Act, 1993 to facilitate recovery of loans by banks and financial institutions to the customers. Orders of the Debt Recovery Tribunal are appealable before the Debts Recovery Appellate Tribunal. Government of India selects the presiding officer in the Tribunal. The Tribunal is based on Debt Recovery Tribunals Act for a debt which is more than Rs 20,00,000. The Jurisdiction extends to whole of India except to the state of Jammu and Kashmir.

== History and objective ==
Debts Recovery Tribunals (DRTs) were formed under Banks and Financial Institutions (RDDBFI) Act, 1993 to facilitate debt recoveries by banks and financial institutions and to design an effective mechanism to recover their dues speedily without being subjected lengthy process of civil courts.

The objective of Debt Recovery Tribunal is to ensure recovery of borrowed money from debtors which are due to banks and various financial institutions. Their role is limited to settling the claims and ensure the balance amount related to non-performing assets as categorised by the banks as per the provisions of RBI guidelines are recovered.

== Powers ==
Debt Recovery Tribunal has powers of District Court for any claims before it relating to recovery of Debts. The Recovery officer in the tribunal is responsible to execute the recovery orders sanctioned by the Presiding Officers. DRT is bound to follow the legal procedure by laying emphasis on quick disposal of the cases and efficient and effective disposal of orders.

== Composition ==
Debt Recovery Tribunal consists of Presiding and Recovery officers.

== Application ==
Debt Recovery Tribunal is applicable for below cases

The Debt Recovery Tribunal Act is applicable in entire India including Jammu & Kashmir after article 370 of the constitution has been made ineffective.

The act is applicable for due amount above Rs. 20, 00,000.

The act is also applicable even if the preliminary application for Debts recovery had been filed only by Banks and the Financial Institutions.

== Places ==
Debt recovery tribunals are set up in 39 places and The debt recovery appellate tribunals are based in 5 places, in India, they are; Mumbai, Delhi, Kolkata, Allahabad, and Chennai.

== Challenges ==
Debt Recovery Tribunal faces understaffing challenges with most positions not being filled up in time.

== See also ==
- Tribunals in India.
