= Directorate General of Income Tax Investigation =

Directorate General of Income Tax Investigation आयकर जांच के महानिदेशालय
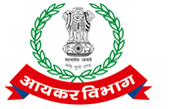

Jurisdictional structure
- Federal agency: India
- Operations jurisdiction: India
- Governing body: Government of India
- General nature: Federal law enforcement

Operational structure
- Headquarters: New Delhi, India
- Parent agency: Investigation Division of the Central Board of Direct Taxes

The Directorate General of Income Tax Investigation is the law enforcement agency under the Ministry of Finance responsible for investigating violations of India's tax laws, including fraud, evasion and money laundering. The controlling authority is the Investigation Division of the Central Board of Direct Taxes.

== See also ==
- List of Income Tax Department officer ranks
- Civil Services of India
