= Department of Agriculture and Farmers Welfare =

Indian Government agency

Agency overview
- Jurisdiction: Republic of India
- Agency executive: Narendra Singh Tomar, Minister of Agriculture and Farmers' Welfare
- Parent department: Ministry of Agriculture and Farmers' Welfare
- Website: https://www.agriwelfare.gov.in/

The Department of Agriculture and Farmers' Welfare (DA&FW) is one of the two constituent departments of Ministry of Agriculture and Farmers' Welfare, the other being the Department of Agriculture Research and Education (DARE). The department is headed by Minister of Agriculture and Farmers' Welfare.

== Organizational structure ==
- Ministry of Agriculture and Farmers Welfare
  - Department of Agriculture and Farmers Welfare
    - Secretary
    - Additional Secretary
    - Joint Secretaries
    - Crop Development Division
    - Horticulture Division
    - Integrated Nutrient Management Division
    - Plant Protection Division
    - Seed Division
    - Extension Division
    - Natural Resource Management Division
    - Policy and Planning Division
    - Administration Division
    - Finance Division
    - Information Technology Division
    - Attached Offices and Subordinate Offices

== History ==
The Agriculture sector is vital for the Indian economy. As per the data of the 2011 Census, 54.6% of India's population was engaged in agriculture and it contributed 17.4% to India's Gross Value Added. The importance of the agriculture sector has led the Government of India to launch numerous initiatives. The department was thus established for sustainable development of the agriculture sector. The DAC&FW is divided into 27 units and has five attached offices and 21 subordinate offices. The pre-independence India had attached Department of Agriculture, Revenue and Commerce set up in 1871. In 1881 the Department of Revenue and Agriculture was separated from it, further in 1923 the Department of Education and Health were combined in it to form Department of Education, Health and Land. In 1945 three separate department were made out of this, which were Department of Education, Health and Agriculture, respectively. In 1947, the Department of Agriculture was rededicated to the Ministry of Agriculture.

The present nomenclature of Ministry of Agriculture and Farmers' Welfare and Department of Agriculture and Farmers' Welfare is attributed to the two agencies vide cabinet resolution of 2015.

== Initiatives ==
=== Rashtriya Krishi Vikas Yojana ===
The Rashtriya Krishi Vikas Yojana (National Agriculture Development Programme) was launched in 2007 and has been implemented across two Five Year Plan periods, namely the 11th and 12th Five Year Plans. The scheme gives incentives to the states to invest in the agriculture sector for holistic development of Agriculture and allied sector. In 2017, the Ministry of Agriculture extended the programme for three years up to 2019-20 which was to run as the centrally sponsored scheme of Rashtriya Krishi Vikas Yojana - Remunerative Approaches for Agriculture and Allied Sector Rejuvenation (RKVY-RAFTAAR). The centre and state's share in the funding is 60:40 for the General category states while for North-East and hilly areas it is 90:10. In case of Union Territory 100% funding is made by central government.

In 2020, under the Innovation and Agri-Entrepreneurship development component of the revamped Rashtriya Krishi Vikas Yojana, the Government of India funded various agricultural startups.

=== Pradhanmantri Fasal Bima Yojna ===
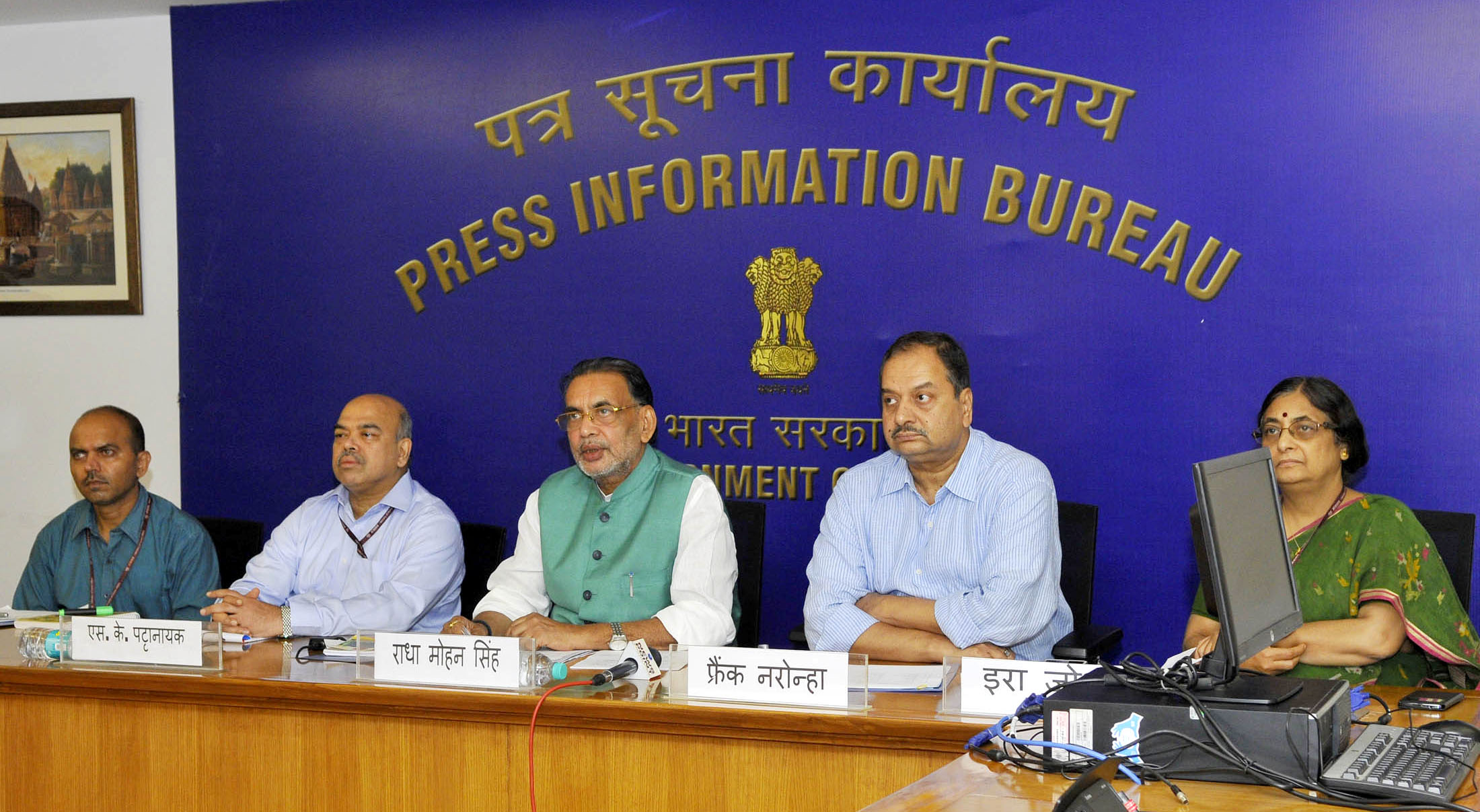
Former Minister for Agriculture and Farmers' Welfare, Shri Radha Mohan Singh interacting with the regional media through video conferencing on “Pradhan Mantri Fasal Bima Yojna”, in New Delhi.

Launched in 2016, this scheme replaces erstwhile National Agriculture Insurance Scheme and Modified National Agriculture Insurance Scheme. It aims to reduce the burden of premium on farmers who take loans for their agricultural operations. The farmers are required to pay 2% premium for all Kharif crops and 1.5% and 5%, respectively, for Rabi and annual horticultural crops. The scheme is enforced under overall coordination of DA&FW and the state governments. The government will pay a balanced premium and there is no upper limit on the government subsidies. Further, the use of cutting-edge technology like GPS is mandated for recording crop-cutting experiment. The insurance plans will be handled under a single company, namely the Agriculture Insurance company of India.

=== Pradhanmantri Kisan Maan Dhan Yojna ===
The Pradhanmantri Kisan Maan Dhan Yojna is a pension scheme with Life Insurance Corporation of India as the pension fund manager. The beneficiary farmers will have to pay a monthly premium ranging from Rs.55 to Rs.200, depending upon their age of entry into the scheme and after reaching the age of 60 years they will be paid a monthly pension of Rs. 3000. The spouse is also eligible for pension after making a separate contribution under the scheme. Further, if the farmer dies after the retirement age then the spouse will receive 50% of the pension as family pension. If the farmer dies before completing the retirement age, the spouse is eligible to continue in the scheme after paying the remaining contribution till the retirement age of the deceased farmer. If the spouse does not wish to continue then the total corpus along with the interest will be paid to the spouse. If there is no spouse, the total contribution along with the premium shall be paid to the nominee. In case of death of both farmer and his spouse, the contribution made will be credited back to the pension fund.

=== Prime Minister Kisan Samman Nidhi Scheme ===
The Prime Minister Kisan Samman Nidhi Scheme or PM Kisan is a type of basic income scheme under which all farmers (subject to some exclusion criteria) are provided an annual income of Rs. 6000 in three installments of Rs. 2000 each, directly into their bank account. Initially, farmers with less than 2 hectares of land were eligible for the scheme but with effect from 1 June 2019 all farmers are eligible for the benefits under the scheme. Affluent and high-income farmers are excluded from receiving the benefits of the scheme, these include the pensioners who receive a minimum sum of Rs.10,000 as pension and professionals such as doctors, engineers, lawyers and Chartered Accountants. Recently union agriculture minister Narendra Singh Tomar has awarded the top performing states and UT's under PM-Kisan.

=== Sub mission on Agroforestry ===
The Department of Agriculture and Farmers Welfare (DA & FW) has been implementing the Sub-Mission on Agroforestry (SMAF) since 2016–17 as part of the recommendation of the National Agroforestry Policy 2014. This sub-mission is under the National Mission for Sustainable Agriculture (NMSA), an umbrella scheme under National Action Plan for Climate Change. India was the first country to have such a comprehensive policy which was launched at the World Agroforestry Congress held in Delhi in February 2014. At present, the scheme is being implemented in 20 States and 2 UTs.

== Divisions ==
The DA&FW is organized into 28 divisions and has five attached offices and twenty-one subordinate offices which are spread across the country for coordination with state level agencies and implementation of Central Sector Schemes in their respective fields. Further, one Public Sector Undertaking, seven autonomous bodies, and two authorities are functioning under the administrative control of department. Some of the important divisions are:

- Digital Agriculture Division
- Drought Management Division
- Crops & Post Harvest Management of Foodgrain Division
- Integrated Nutrient Management Division
- Plant Protection Division
- Rainfed Farming System
- Agriculture Trade Policy, Promotion and Logistics Development Division
- Agricultural Marketing Division
- Crop Insurance Division
