= Customs, Excise and Service Tax Appellate Tribunal =

Excise and Service Tax organisation

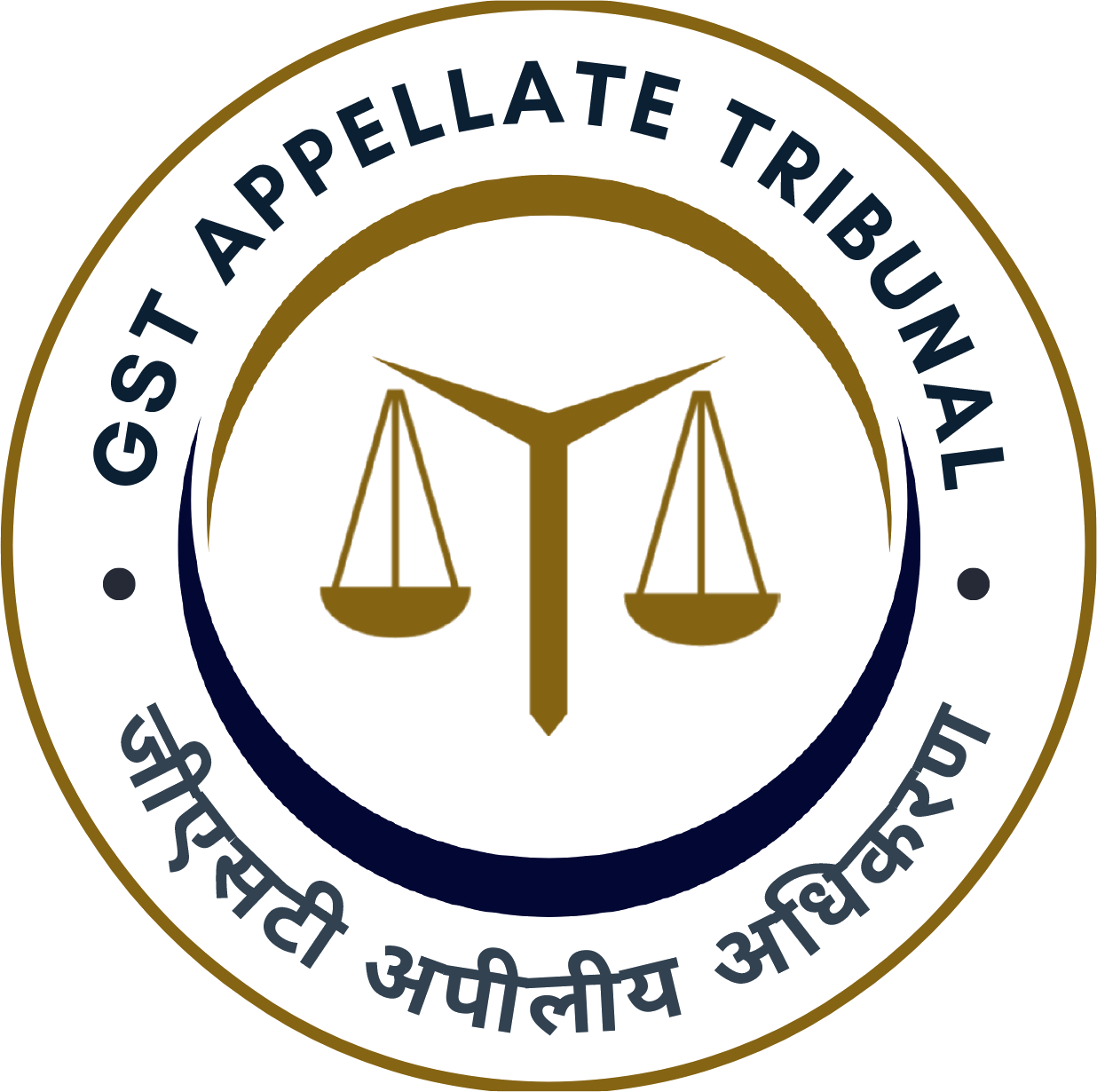
Logo of The GSTAT

The Customs, Excise and Service Tax Appellate Tribunal (CESTAT) is an India quasi-judicial body that hears appeals against orders and decisions passed under the Customs Act, 1962 and Central Excise Act, 1944 as amended from time to time. It was constituted as Customs, Excise and Gold (Control) Appellate Tribunal (CEGAT) under section 129 of Customs Act, 1962, as amended by section 50 and the Fifth Schedule of Finance (No. 2) Act, 1980. These amendments became effective from 11 October 1982 and the Tribunal was also constituted on the same date. Its initial mandate was under Customs Act, 1962, Central Excise Act, 1944 and Gold (Control) Act, 1968. Service tax was introduced by Chapter V of Finance Act, 1994 and this also was added to the jurisdiction of CEGAT. Accordingly, the name of the Tribunal was changed to Customs, Excise and Service Tax Appellate Tribunal (CESTAT) by amending section 129 of the Customs Act, by section 119 of Finance Act, 2003, effective from 14 May 2003.

The Tribunal also has appellate jurisdiction in Anti Dumping matters and the Special Bench headed by the President, CESTAT, hears appeals against the orders passed by the Designated Authority in the Ministry of Commerce.

According to Section 86, any assessment order passed by Commissioner of Central Excise under section 73 or Section 83A or orders of revision by Commissioner of Central Excise under Section 84 or orders of the Commissioner of Central Excise (Appeals) under Section 85 are appealable before the Appellate Tribunal (CESTAT) by any of the aggrieved parties i.e., assessee, Commissioner of Central Excise or the Board.

The Government enacted a law in 1986, to create a Tribunal with powers similar to a High Court's, called Customs and Excise Revenues Appellate Tribunal. Most powers of CESTAT were to be diverted to CERAT. This Act was not operationalised due to multiple difficulties including court cases, making an amendment necessary. This Act was later repealed by Customs and Central Excise Laws (Repeal) Act, 2004.

== Powers of tribunal under The Customs Act, 1962. ==
CESTAT functions with the following limitations, as it cannot:

- Grant compensation owing to unlawful action of revenue authorities.
- Review its own order (as any quasi-judicial authority cannot review its own order).
- Exercise powers beyond statute (as it is a creature of statute only).
- Issue writs or grant relief which ought to be granted by high court.
- Comment on legitimacy of statute. Must presume legal validity of the provisions of Act and Rules.
- Punish for its own contempt (must forward it to high court for its consideration).
- Act as a court (as it is a tribunal and cannot be equated to a court. Members of tribunal are not judges and their decisions are orders, not judgments).
- Overrule any high court judgement (as it is bound by judgements of high courts and Supreme Court).
