= Investigation Division of the Central Board of Direct Taxes =

Investigation Division of the Central Board of Direct Taxes केन्द्रीय प्रत्यक्ष कर बोर्ड की जांच प्रभाग

Jurisdictional structure
- Federal agency: India
- Operations jurisdiction: India
- Governing body: Government of India
- General nature: Federal law enforcement

Operational structure
- Headquarters: New Delhi, India
- Agency executive: Ravi Agarwal, IRS, Member
- Parent agency: Ministry of Finance, Department of Revenue

The Investigation Division of the CBDT, abbreviated as Inv-CBDT, is the revenue enforcement agency of the Central Board of Direct Taxes, Government of India. It functions under the Department of Revenue in the Union Ministry of Finance and is concerned with the collection and administration of, as well as enforcement and prosecution of cases related to, the various direct taxes accruing to the Union Government.

== Functions ==
1. Processing of complaints regarding evasion of tax;

2. All matters relating to administrative approval for filing, dropping or withdrawing of prosecution cases in respect of offences mentioned in Chapter XXII of the Income Tax Act and corresponding provisions in other direct taxes;

3. All technical and administrative matters relating to provisions of sections 147 to 153 (both inclusive) of the Income-tax Act, 1961;

4. Searches, seizures and reward to informants;

5. Survey;

6. Voluntary disclosure schemes;

7. Matters relating to the Smugglers and Foreign Exchange Manipulators (Forfeiture of Property) Act, 1976;

8. Work connected with High Denomination Bank Notes (Demonetisations) Act, 1978;

9. Supervision and control over the work of Directorate General of Income Tax Investigation Directorate of Income Tax Intelligence and Criminal Investigation, Chief Commissioner of Income Tax Central, To collect intelligence and information regarding aspects of the black economy which require close watch and investigation. Also, keeping in view the scene of economic offences, the Bureau is required to collect information and provide periodical and special reports to the concerned authorities;

10. To keep a watch on different aspects of economic offences and the emergence of new types of such offences. The Bureau was made responsible for evolving counter -measures required for effectively dealing with existing and new types of economic offences;

11. To act as the nodal agency for cooperation and coordination at the international level with other customs, drugs, law enforcement and other agencies in the area of economic offences.

12. To implementation of the COFEPOSA(i.e. Conservation of Foreign Exchange & Prevention of Smuggling Activities Act, 1971 which provides for preventive detention of persons involved in smuggling and foreign exchange rackets under certain specified circumstances)

== Control ==
The Member (Investigation) of the CBDT exercises control over this division. The Member is a high-ranking IRS officer of the rank of Secretary to the Government of India. The Member controls the:

- Directorate General of Income Tax Investigation
- Directorate of Income Tax Intelligence and Criminal Investigation
- Chief Commissioner of Income Tax Central

== See also ==
- List of Income Tax Department officer ranks
- Civil Services of India
