= Appellate Tribunal for Foreign Exchange =

The Appellate Tribunal for Foreign Exchange, also known as the FEMA Tribunal, is the Indian Tribunal for violations of its Foreign Exchange Laws. Officer are drawn from the IRS and IPS.

The same was formed under the FEMA Act which replaced the erstwhile Foreign Exchange Regulation Act (FERA). While the main object of FERA was to conserve the foreign exchange resources and prevent the misuse thereof; the object of the FEMA was to promote and develop the foreign exchange management in India. Thus the FEMA seeks to 'manage' the foreign exchange whilst the FERA sought to control the same by 'regulating' it.

Under the FEMA, the order of adjudication is to be made by the 'Adjudicating Authority' which is subject to challenge before the Special Director (Appeals). Appeal against the order of the Special Director (Appeals), or in case where one of the Special Directors is the 'Adjudicating Authority', is before the "Appellate Tribunal for Foreign Exchange". An appeal against the order of the Tribunal lies before the High Court of the respective states.
