= Indian Diamond Institute =

Autonomous higher school of learning in Surat, Gujarat, India

- Motto in English: Passion; Technology; Innovation
- Type: Registered Society
- Established: 1978
- Location: Surat, Gujarat, India; 21.18°N 72.83°E
- Nickname: IDI
- Website: diamondinstitute.net
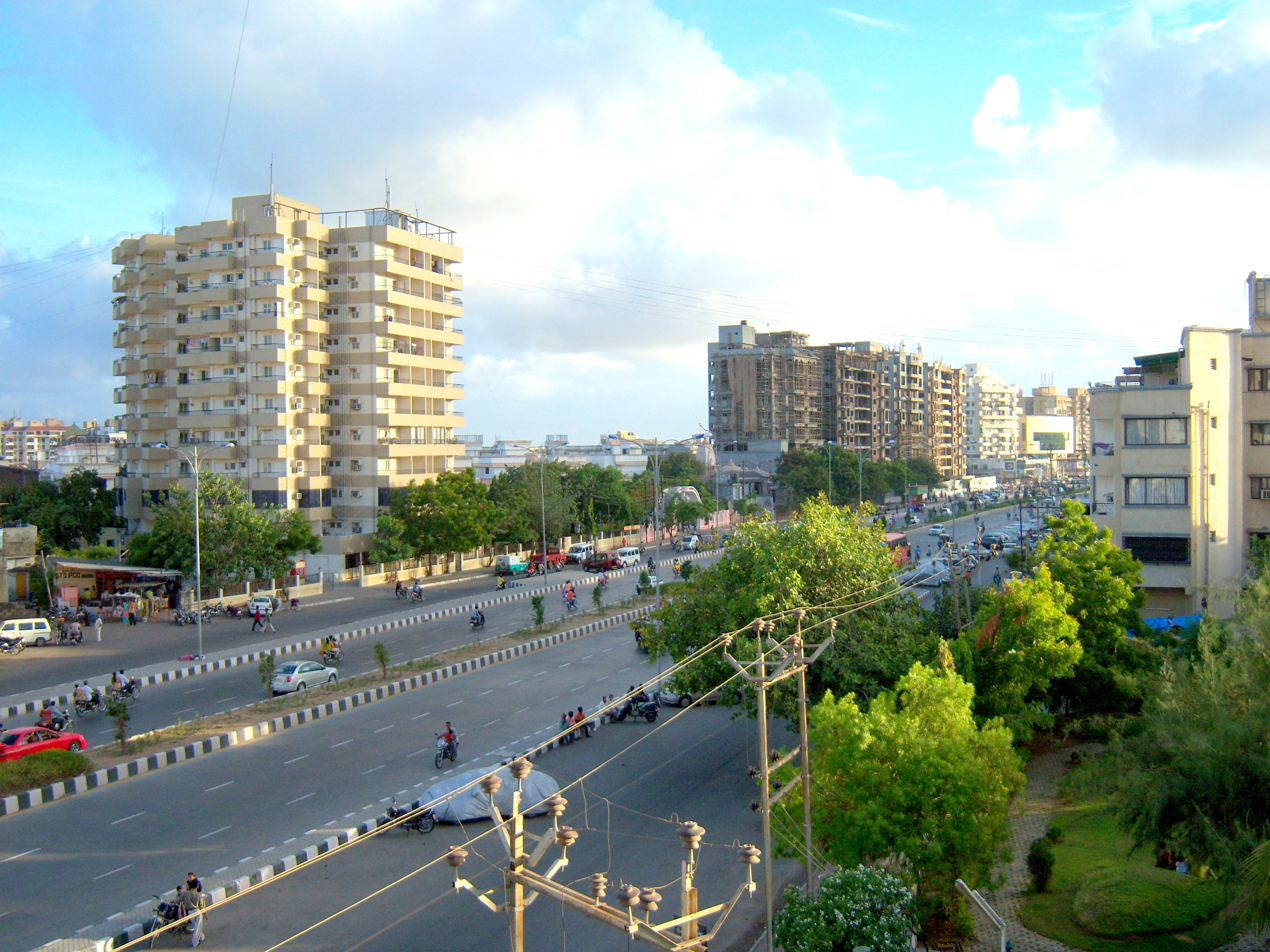

The Indian Diamond Institute (IDI) is a Government of India sponsored autonomous higher school of learning in the fields of diamonds, gems and jewellery in India. The Institute is located in Surat, Gujarat, India and is 263 km away from Mumbai. Indian Diamond Institute is an Authorised Assayer of Department of Customs, Government of India.

== Profile ==
The Indian Diamond Institute was formed in 1978 by the Government of India to enhance the learning facilities in the fields of diamond, gems and jewellery. The Institute, formed as a project of Gems and Jewellery Export Promotion Council (GJEPC) of Government of India, offers various courses of study and research facilities at its Surat Centre. Primarily registered as a society under Societies Registration Act, 1860, IDI has also been registered under the Bombay Public Trust Act of 1950. It is now recognized as a premier institute of its kind in India.

Government of Botswana approached IDI for assistance in setting up a diamond institute in Botswana in 2013 following the De Beers decision to shift its diamond sales operations base from London to Botswana.

== Facilities ==
The Institute functions out of a two storeyed building with classrooms, conference room, seminar room, computer labs, design studios, advanced diamond & gem testing laboratory, auditorium, mess and canteen, gymnasium, recreation room, guest rooms, library stocked with books on gems & jewellery and leading magazines related to the field.

== Research and development ==
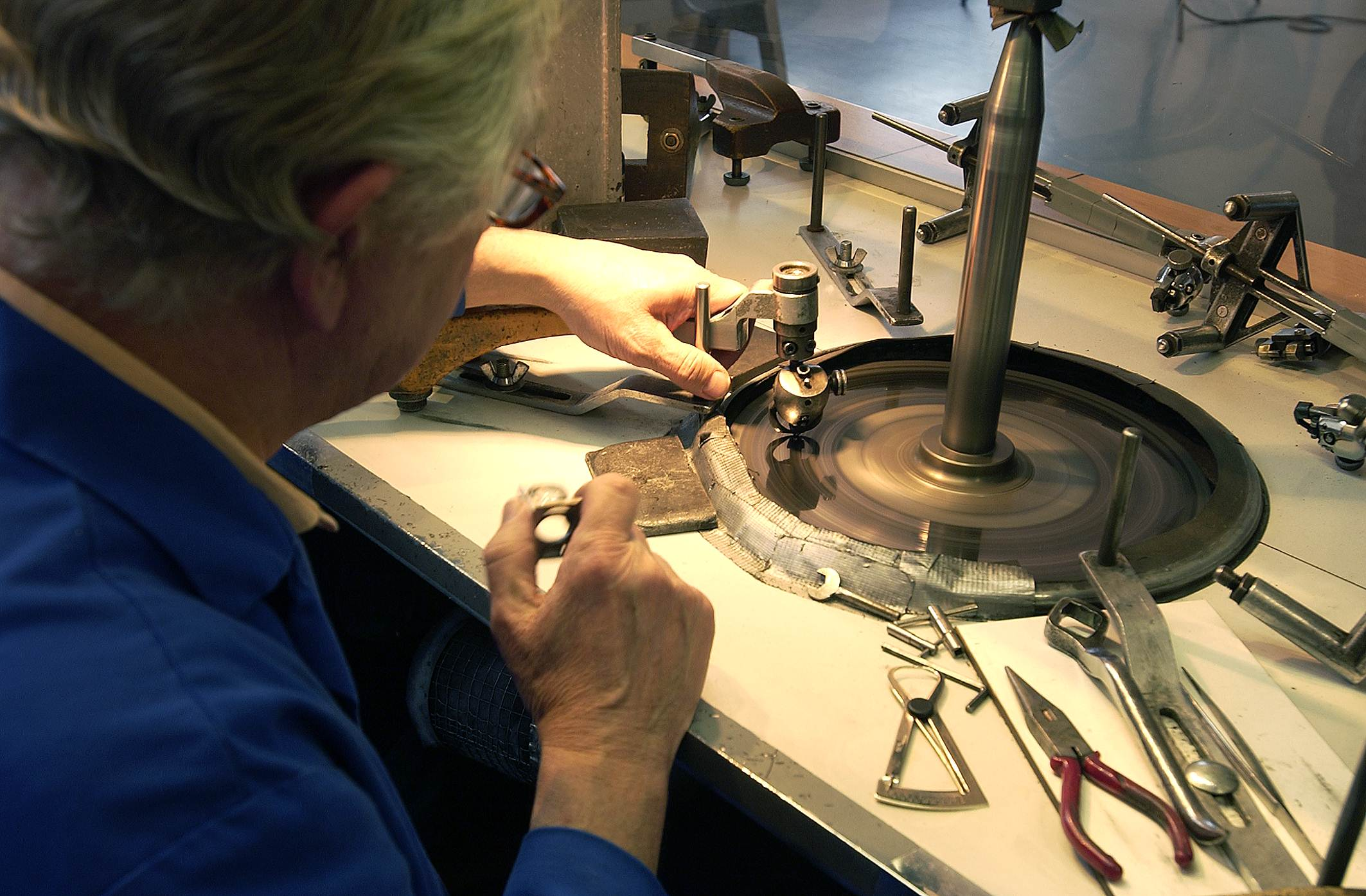
Diamond polishing

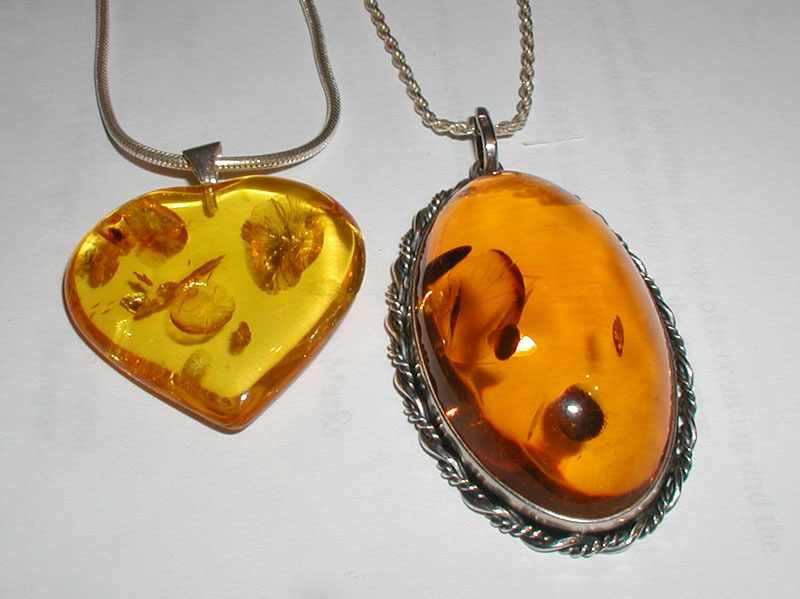
Amber Pendants

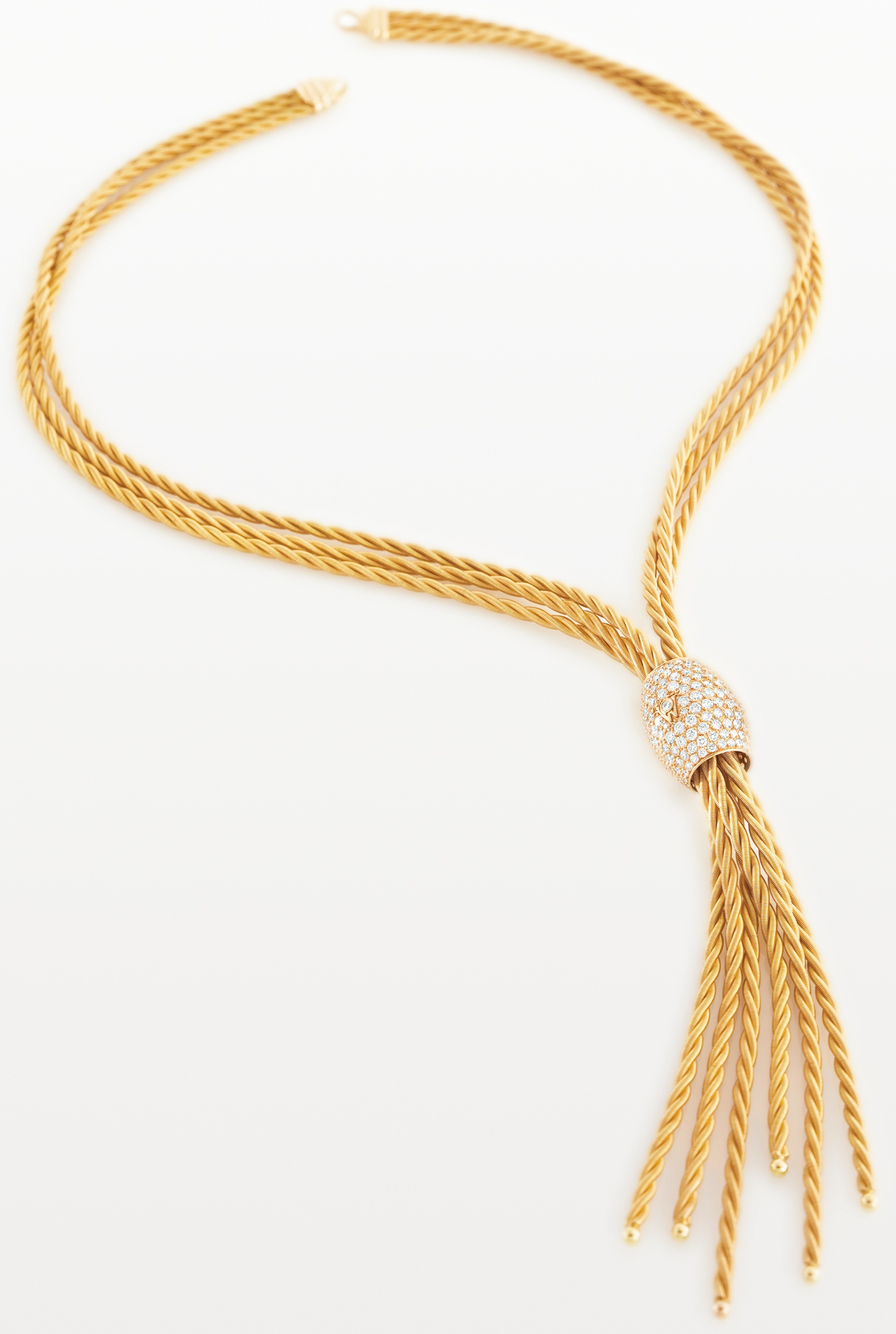
Diamond temptation design

IDI has an established R&D centre which is registered with Government of India, Department of Scientific and Industrial Research (DSIR), Ministry of Science & Technology.

=== Mandate ===
The R&D centre is mandated to:

- Give scientific and technological support to the diamond industries to upgrade the processing technology.
- Develop indigenously low cost technologies for import substitution products used in the diamond industries so as to help the country to save foreign exchange and also reduce the cost of processing.
- Carry out in-depth studies on illumination and noise levels, thermal load, air velocity etc. to improve environmental conditions of the processing unit
- Bring awareness amongst workers about the use of modern machine concepts and quality control checks to improve productivity, efficiency and yield.

== Memberships and Affiliations ==
IDI has technical collaboration with Gemmological Association (Gem A), London and operates as an Allied Teaching Centre of Gem A for FGA programme (Fellow Member of Gemmlogical Association (Gem A), London (Diploma in Gemmology).

IDI has been accorded with recognition as a Scientific & Industrial Research Organisation (SIRO) under Department of Scientific & Industrial Research, Ministry of Science & Technology, Government of India. It has been also recognised as Anchor Institute (Gem & Jewellery) by Industries Commissionerate, Government of Gujarat.

The IDI is ISO 9001:2008 certified for design, development and provision of training, consultancy & certification services related to diamonds, coloured stones & jewellery (vide Certificate No. 44254 issued by M/s. ABS Quality Evaluations, Inc.)

The Institute is also a member of many organisations such as:

- Indian Institute of Foreign Trade, New Delhi and (IIFT).
- Confederation of Indian Industry (CII).
- Indo-American Chamber of Commerce, Ahmedabad (IACC).
- Indian Society for Training & Development (ISTD).
- The Southern Gujarat Chamber of Commerce & Industry (SGCCI),

== Courses ==
The Institute offers various courses of varying durations.

=== Diamond ===
- Diploma
- Certificate program
- Non-standard program
- Correspondence program
- Corporate training program

=== Jewellery ===
- Graduate diploma program
- 3 Years B.Sc. program
- Diploma program
- Certificate program
- Non-standard program
- Correspondence program

=== Gemmology ===
- Diploma program
- Certificate program
- Non-standard program
- Correspondence program

=== International Program ===
- FGA foundation program
- FGA Diploma program

== Services to the Trade ==
- Diamond Certification / Gemstone Identification & Certification
- Jewellery (Studded/Plain) Certification
- Diamond Packet Lot Certification
- Product Compatibility Certificate
- Diamond Processing - Planning, Bruting, Polishing
- Project Profiles for Gem & Jewellery Industry
- LRS / FTIR / UV-VIS-NIR Studies on gemstones
- Pearl Testing Report
- Professional Life Membership
- Mobile Testing Facility for Studded Diamond Jewellery
- Diamond Girdle Marking
- Jewellery Inscription

== See also ==
- List of tourist attractions in Surat
