= Ministry of Culture (India) =

Government ministry of India

- Branch of Government of India

- Ministry of Culture

Agency overview
- Jurisdiction: Government of India
- Headquarters: 2nd Floor, Kartavya Bhawan-2, New Delhi
- Annual budget: ₹3,399.65 crore (US$350 million) (2023-24 est.)
- Ministers responsible: Gajendra Singh Shekhawat, Cabinet Minister; Rao Inderjit Singh, Minister of State
- Website: culture.gov.in

The Ministry of Culture is the Indian government ministry charged with preservation and promotion of art and culture of India.

Gajendra Singh Shekhawat is the current Minister of Culture. Recently the government has established the National Mission on Libraries India under this ministry.

== History ==
The body now known as the Ministry of Culture was originally established as the Department of Culture in 1971.

For its first 14 years, it was administered as a department under the Ministry of Education and Social Welfare (later the Ministry of Education and Culture).

In 1985, as part of a government-wide administrative re-organisation, the Department of Culture was moved and placed under the newly created Ministry of Human Resource Development (HRD).

This arrangement continued until 1999, when the department was separated from the HRD Ministry and briefly merged with another portfolio to form the Ministry of Tourism and Culture.

This combined ministry was bifurcated on 27 May 2006, leading to the creation of a standalone, cabinet-level Ministry of Culture and a separate Ministry of Tourism. Since 2006, the Ministry of Culture has functioned as an independent ministry within the Government of India.

== Characteristics ==
The restoration of ancient idols smuggled out of India comes under the Ministry of Culture.

As of 1 October 2021, the Government of India has recovered 211 idols. Till 2014 only 13 idols were recovered. 198 idols have been restored since 2014.

In June 2022, more than 10 idols were recovered and handed over to the Tamil Nadu Idol Rescue Unit. 228 idols have been recovered till 2022.

Total no of recovered Artifacts
Year	Total No of Artifacts
1976	1
1979	1
1986	3
1990	1
1991	2
1999	2
2000	1
2001	1
2013	1
2014	2
2015	3
2016	14
2017	9
2018	2
2019	2
2020	8
2021	158
2022	30

== Divisions ==
- Creative Economy
- Museums
- Libraries & Archives
- Akademies & Training Institutes
- Buddhist Tibetan Institutes
- Research & Technology
- Archaeology
- Performing Arts

== Organisation ==
- Attached offices
  - Archaeological Survey of India
  - Central Secretariat Library
  - National Archives of India
- Subordinate offices
  - Anthropological Survey of India, Kolkata
  - Central Reference Library, Kolkata
  - National Research Laboratory for Conservation of Cultural Property, Lucknow
  - National Gallery of Modern Art, New Delhi
  - National Gallery of Modern Art, Mumbai
  - National Gallery of Modern Art, Bengaluru
  - National Library of India, Kolkata
  - National Museum, New Delhi
  - National Monuments Authority
- Autonomous organisations
  - National Mission for Manuscripts, Delhi
  - Allahabad Museum, Prayagraj
  - Asiatic Society, Kolkata
  - Central Institute of Buddhist Studies, Jammu and Kashmir
  - Central Institute of Higher Tibetan Studies (CIHTS)
  - Central Universities of Tibetan Studies, Sarnath, Varanasi - Buddhist Institutes
  - Centre for Cultural Resources and Training, New Delhi
  - Delhi Public Library, Delhi
  - Gandhi Smriti and Darshan Samiti, New Delhi
  - Indian Museum, Kolkata
  - Indira Gandhi National Centre for the Arts (IGNCA), New Delhi
  - Indira Gandhi Rashtriya Manava Sangrahalaya, Bhopal
  - Kalakshetra Foundation, Thiruvanmiyur, Chennai
  - Khuda Baksh Oriental Public Library, Patna
  - Lalit Kala Academy, New Delhi
  - Maulana Abul Kalam Azad Institute of Asian Studies (MAKAIAS), Kolkata
  - National Council of Science Museums, Kolkata
  - National Museum Institute of the History of Art, Conservation and Museology (NMIHACM), Delhi
  - National School of Drama, New Delhi
  - National Culture Fund
  - Central Institute of Himalayan Culture Studies, Arunachal Pradesh - Buddhist Institutes
  - Nava Nalanda Mahavihara, Nalanda, Bihar
  - Nehru Memorial Museum and Library, New Delhi (Teen Murti Bhavan)
  - Raja Ram Mohan Roy Library Foundation, Kolkata, registered under the West Bengal Societies Registration Act, 1961
  - Raza Library, Rampur
  - Sahitya Akademi (SA), New Delhi
  - Salar Jung Museum, Hyderabad
  - Sangeet Natak Akademi (SNA), New Delhi
  - Saraswathi Mahal Library, Tanjore
  - Victoria Memorial Hall, Kolkata
- Zonal Cultural Centers (based on Cultural Zones of India)
  - Eastern Zonal Cultural Centre, Kolkata
  - North Central Zone Cultural Centre, Allahabad
  - North East Zone Cultural Centre
  - North Zone Cultural Centre
  - South Central Zone Cultural Centre, Nagpur
  - South Zone Culture Centre, Tanjavur, Tamil Nadu
  - West Zone Cultural Centre
- Public Sector Undertakings
  - National Minorities Development and Finance Corporation

== List of ministers ==
=== Cabinet Ministers ===
Portrait	Minister (Birth-Death) Constituency	Term of office			Political party	Ministry	Prime Minister
Portrait	Minister (Birth-Death) Constituency	From	To	Period	Political party	Ministry	Prime Minister
	Ananth Kumar (1959–2018); MP for Bangalore South	13 October 1999	1 September 2001	1 year, 323 days	Bharatiya Janata Party	Vajpayee III	Atal Bihari Vajpayee
	Maneka Gandhi (born 1956); MP for Pilibhit (MoS, I/C)	1 September 2001	18 November 2001	78 days	Bharatiya Janata Party	Vajpayee III	Atal Bihari Vajpayee
	Jagmohan (1927–2021); MP for New Delhi	18 November 2001	22 May 2004	2 years, 186 days	Bharatiya Janata Party	Vajpayee III	Atal Bihari Vajpayee
	Jaipal Reddy (1942–2018); MP for Miryalguda	23 May 2004	29 January 2006	1 year, 251 days	Indian National Congress	Manmohan I	Manmohan Singh
	Ambika Soni (born 1942); MP for Punjab (Rajya Sabha)	29 January 2006	22 May 2009	3 years, 113 days	Indian National Congress	Manmohan I	Manmohan Singh
	Manmohan Singh (1932–2024); MP for Assam (Rajya Sabha) (Prime Minister)	22 May 2009	19 January 2011	1 year, 242 days	Indian National Congress	Manmohan II	Manmohan Singh
	Selja Kumari (born 1962); MP for Ambala	19 January 2011	28 October 2012	1 year, 283 days	Indian National Congress	Manmohan II	Manmohan Singh
	Chandresh Kumari Katoch (born 1944); MP for Jodhpur	28 October 2012	26 May 2014	1 year, 210 days	Indian National Congress	Manmohan II	Manmohan Singh
	Shripad Naik (born 1952); MP for North Goa (MoS, I/C)	26 May 2014	9 November 2014	167 days	Bharatiya Janata Party	Modi I	Narendra Modi
	Mahesh Sharma (born 1959); MP for Gautam Buddh Nagar (MoS, I/C)	9 November 2014	30 May 2019	4 years, 202 days	Bharatiya Janata Party	Modi I	Narendra Modi
	Prahlad Singh Patel (born 1960); MP for Damoh (MoS, I/C)	31 May 2019	7 July 2021	2 years, 37 days	Bharatiya Janata Party	Modi II	Narendra Modi
	G. Kishan Reddy (born 1964); MP for Secunderabad	7 July 2021	11 June 2024	5 years, 74 days	Bharatiya Janata Party	Modi II	Narendra Modi
	Gajendra Singh Shekhawat (born 1967); MP for Jodhpur	11 June 2024	Incumbent	2 years, 100 days	Bharatiya Janata Party	Modi III	Narendra Modi

=== Ministers of State ===
Portrait	Minister (Birth-Death) Constituency	Term of office			Political party	Ministry	Prime Minister
Portrait	Minister (Birth-Death) Constituency	From	To	Period	Political party	Ministry	Prime Minister
	Kanti Singh (born 1957); MP for Arrah	6 April 2008	22 May 2009	1 year, 46 days	Rashtriya Janata Dal	Manmohan I	Manmohan Singh
	Arjun Ram Meghwal (born 1953); MP for Bikaner	7 July 2021	11 June 2024	2 years, 340 days	Bharatiya Janata Party	Modi II	Narendra Modi
	Meenakshi Lekhi (born 1967); MP for New Delhi	7 July 2021	11 June 2024	2 years, 340 days	Bharatiya Janata Party	Modi II	Narendra Modi
	Rao Inderjit Singh (born 1951); MP for Gurgaon	11 June 2024	Incumbent	2 years, 100 days	Bharatiya Janata Party	Modi III	Narendra Modi

== See also ==
- Directorate of Language Planning and Implementation
