= Eastern Zonal Cultural Centre =

EZCC
- Eastern Zonal Cultural Centre
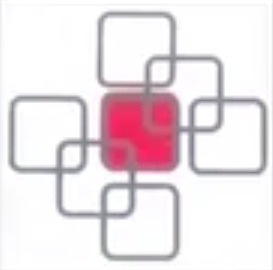
- Formation: 1985
- Founder: Rajiv Gandhi
- Type: autonomous organization
- Purpose: Education, preservation and promotion of arts and culture
- Headquarters: Kolkata, India
- Owner: Ministry of Culture
- Website: www.ezcc-india.org

The Eastern Zonal Cultural Centre (abbreviated as EZCC) is an autonomous organization under Ministry of Culture (India), Government of India covering the states of Assam, Bihar, Jharkhand, Manipur, Odisha, Sikkim, Tripura, West Bengal and Andaman and Nicobar Islands, registered under West Bengal Society Registration Act (Act XXVI of 1961). Its headquarters in Sector III, Salt Lake City, Kolkata, is situated in the Indian state of West Bengal, on account of Kolkata being referred to as the "Cultural Capital of India". This zone is home to three classical dances, namely, Odissi, Sattriya and Manipuri dance; types of music include the classical Odissi music and semi-classical Rabindra Sangeet. In addition, Odia is one of the classical languages in India and the only living classical language from Eastern India.

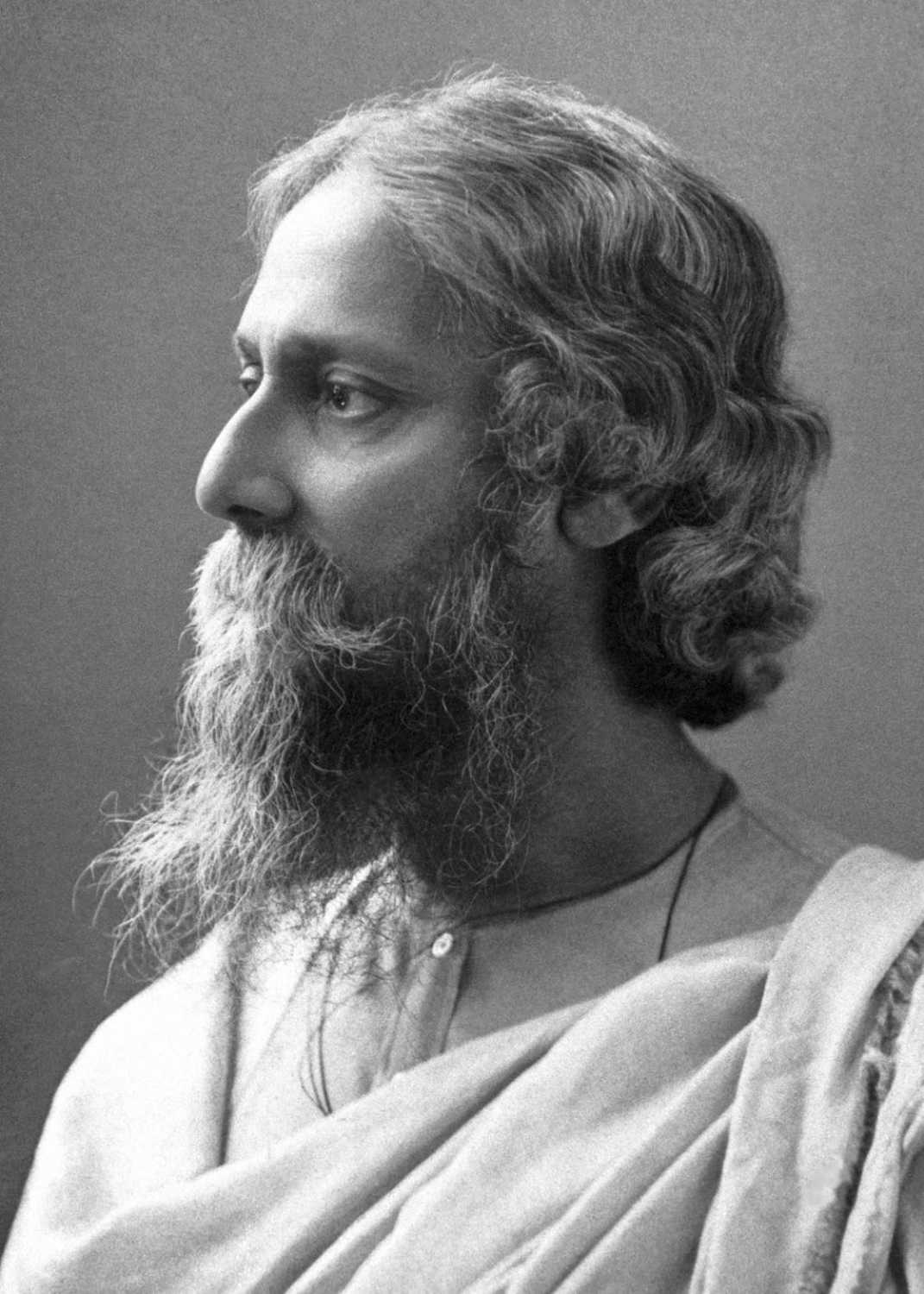
Rabindranath Tagore is Asia's first Nobel laureate and composer of India's national anthem

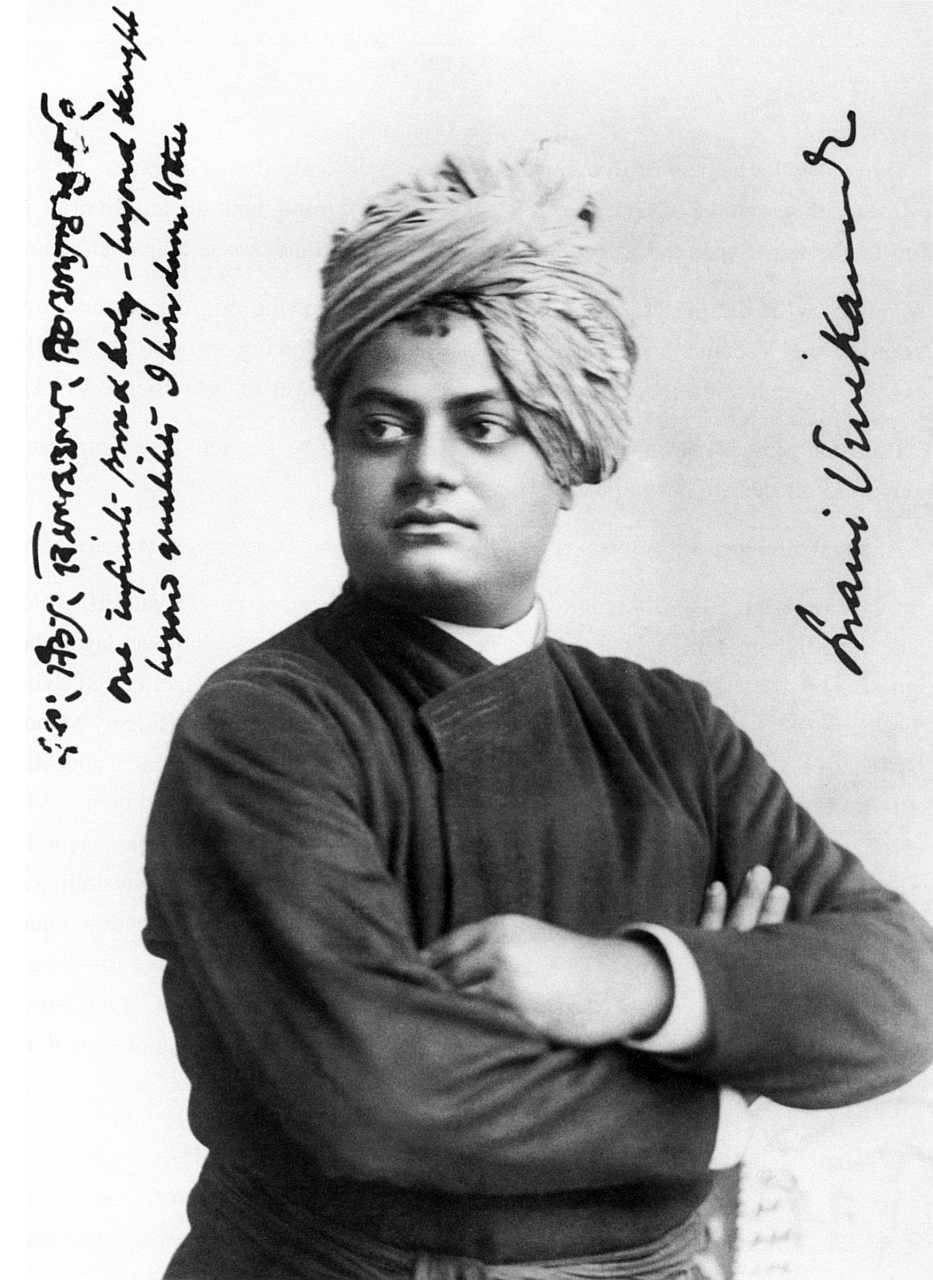
Swami Vivekananda was a key figure in introducing Vedanta and Yoga in Europe and USA, raising interfaith awareness and making Hinduism a world religion.

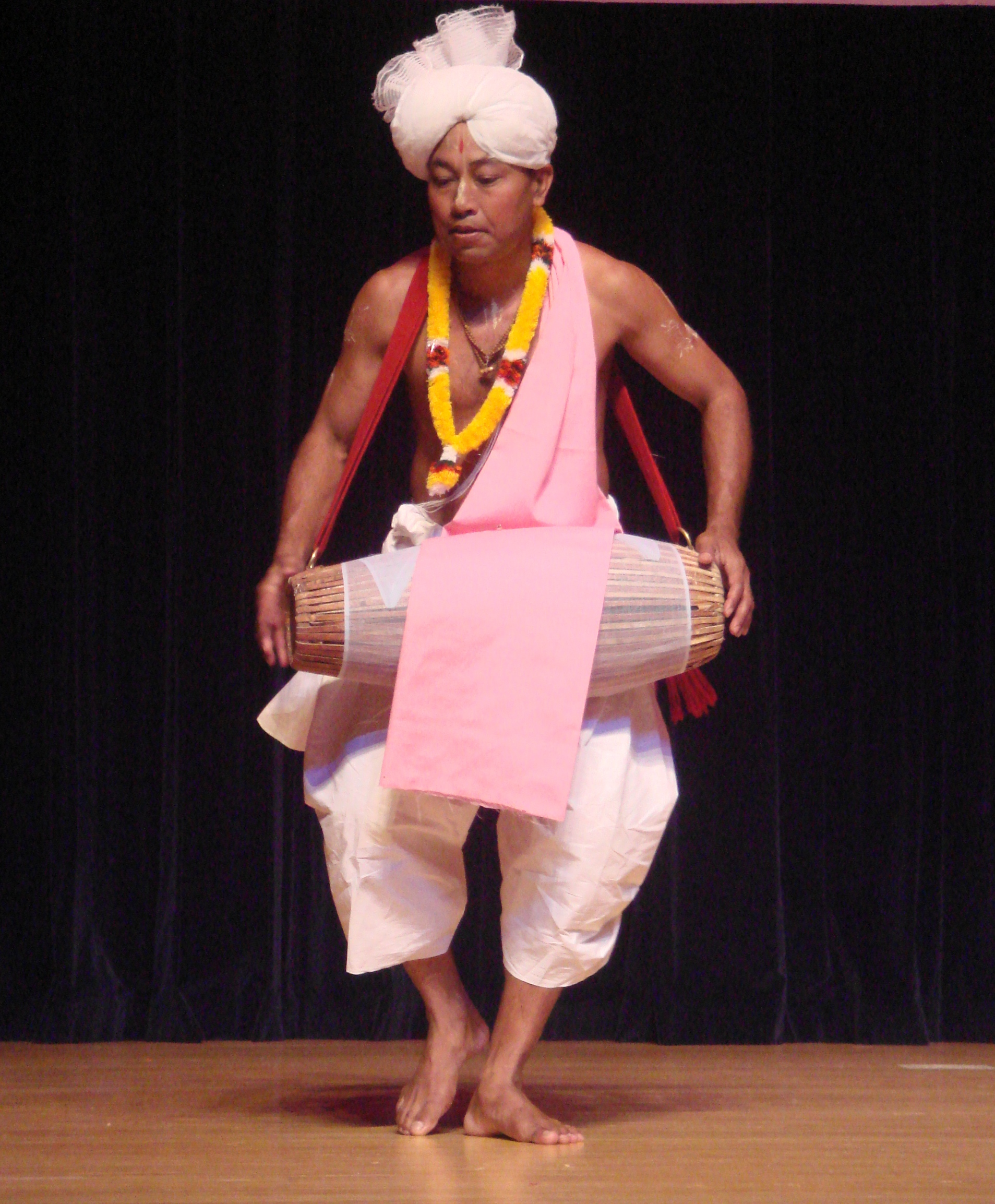
A traditional, Pung cholom performer.

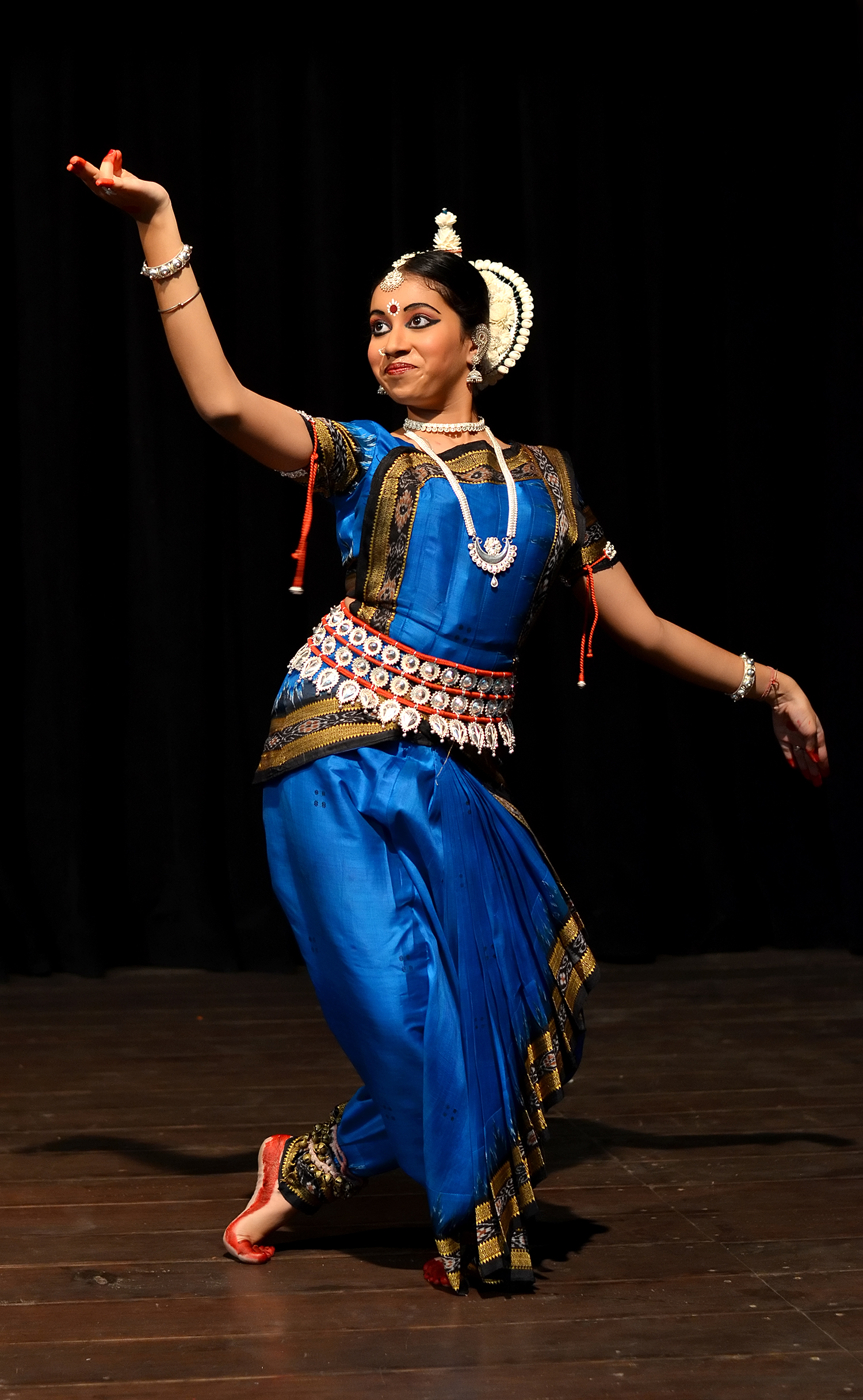
Odissi performer

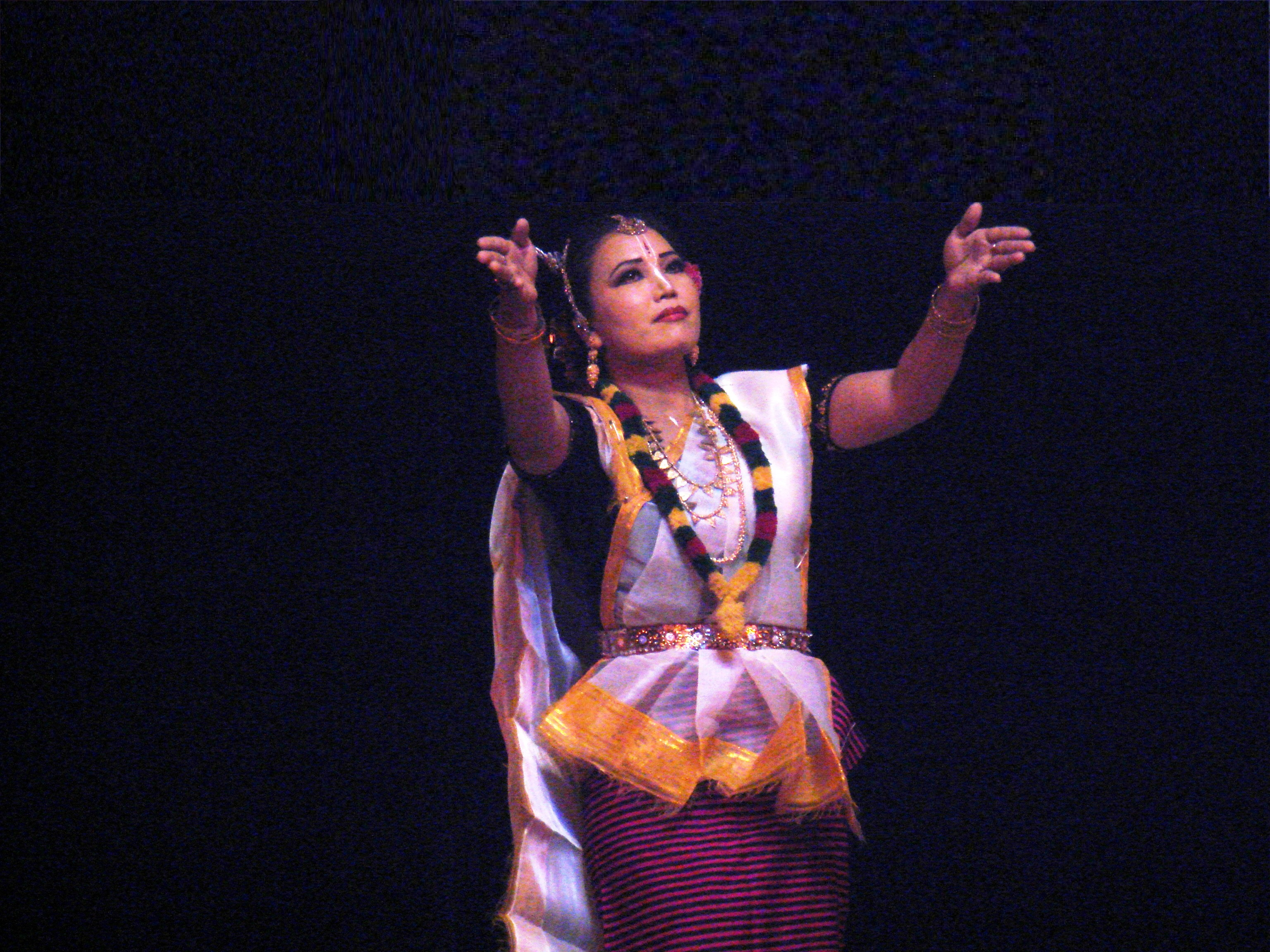
A Manipuri performer strikes an evocative pose.

== History ==
The EZCC was founded in 1985 and since, has been playing a significant role in promoting the numerous ethnic cultural centres and groups of excellence of the eastern parts of the India, with the objective of projection and dissemination of the traditional culture of Eastern India.

== Composition ==
The EZCC is composed of the following members:

1. Director, Cultural Affairs Department, Government of Assam
2. Director, Arts, Culture & Youth Affairs Department, Government of Bihar
3. Director, Department of Art, Culture, Sports and Youth Affairs, Government of Jharkhand
4. Commissioner (Art & Culture), Government of Manipur
5. Director of Culture, Government of Odisha
6. OSD, Cultural Affairs & Heritage Department, Government of Sikkim
7. Secretary & Director, ICAT, Government of Tripura
8. Joint Secretary & Ex-Officio, Director of Culture, Government of West Bengal
9. Director, Department of Art and Culture, Andaman and Nicobar Islands Administration.

== Schemes ==
There are various schemes sponsored by The Ministry of Culture, Government of India gives grants to the Zonal Cultural Centers. These schemes are National Cultural Exchange Programme, Theatre rejuvenation scheme, North East Programme, Guru Shishya Parampara and young talent search. To promote the culture in youth there are many competition organise by EZCC in following fields :

- Folk Music
- Folk Dance
- Classical Music
- Classical Dance

To preserve this Indian tradition, the EZCC organises various Guru Shishya Parampara schemes, which include:

- Gotipua Dance (Odisha)
- Purulia Chhau Dance (West Bengal)
- Paika / Paika akhada a War Dancs from (Odisha)
- Nauta (West Bengal)
- Bordoishilka (Assam)
- Thang-Ta Dance (Manipur)
- Bhatiali Folk Songs (West Bengal)
- Kushan Dance (Assam)
- Pung cholom (Manipur)
- Maruni (Sikkim)

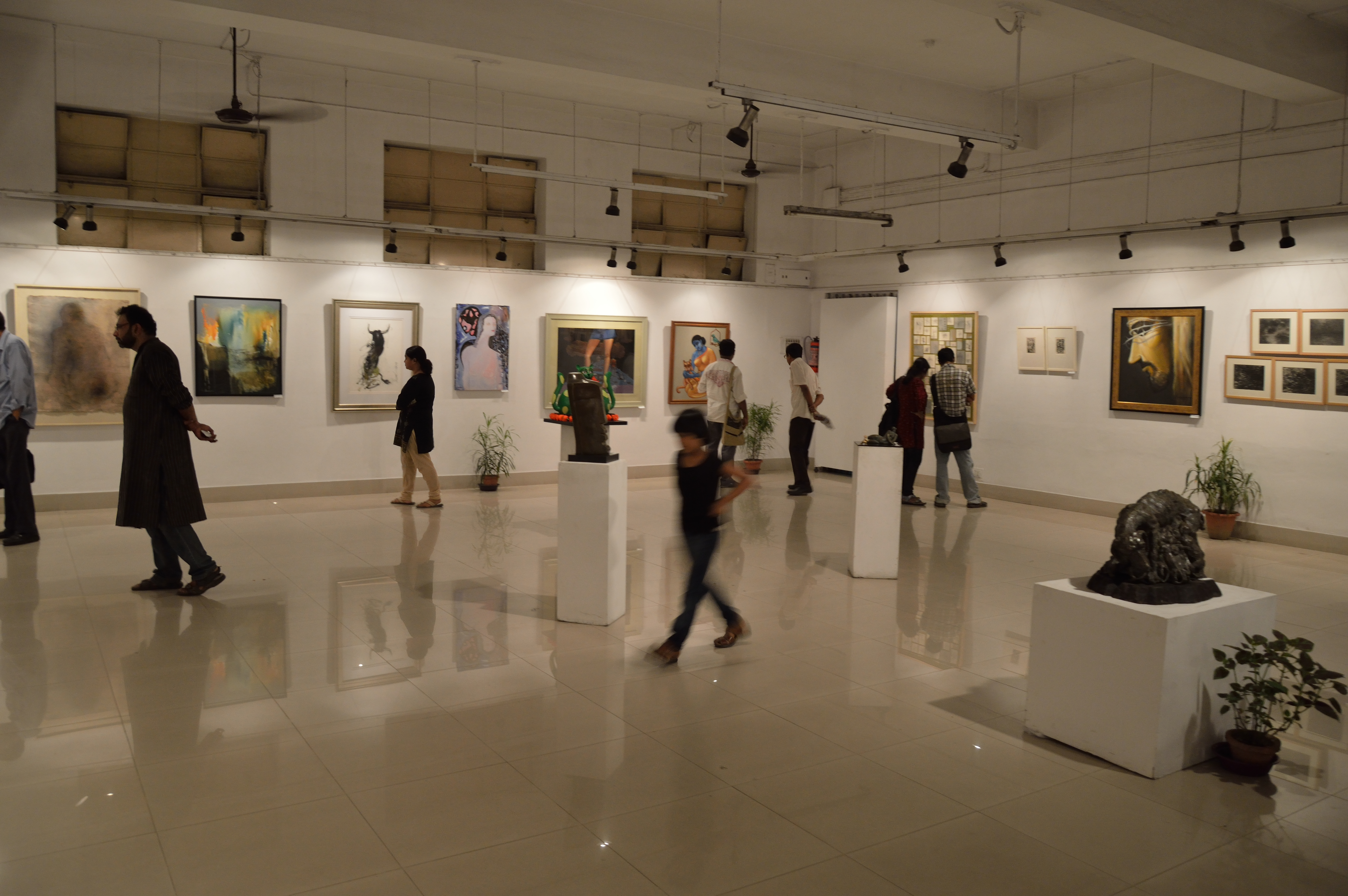
An exhibition of painting and sculpture is going on at the Academy of Fine Arts, in the city of joy Kolkata.

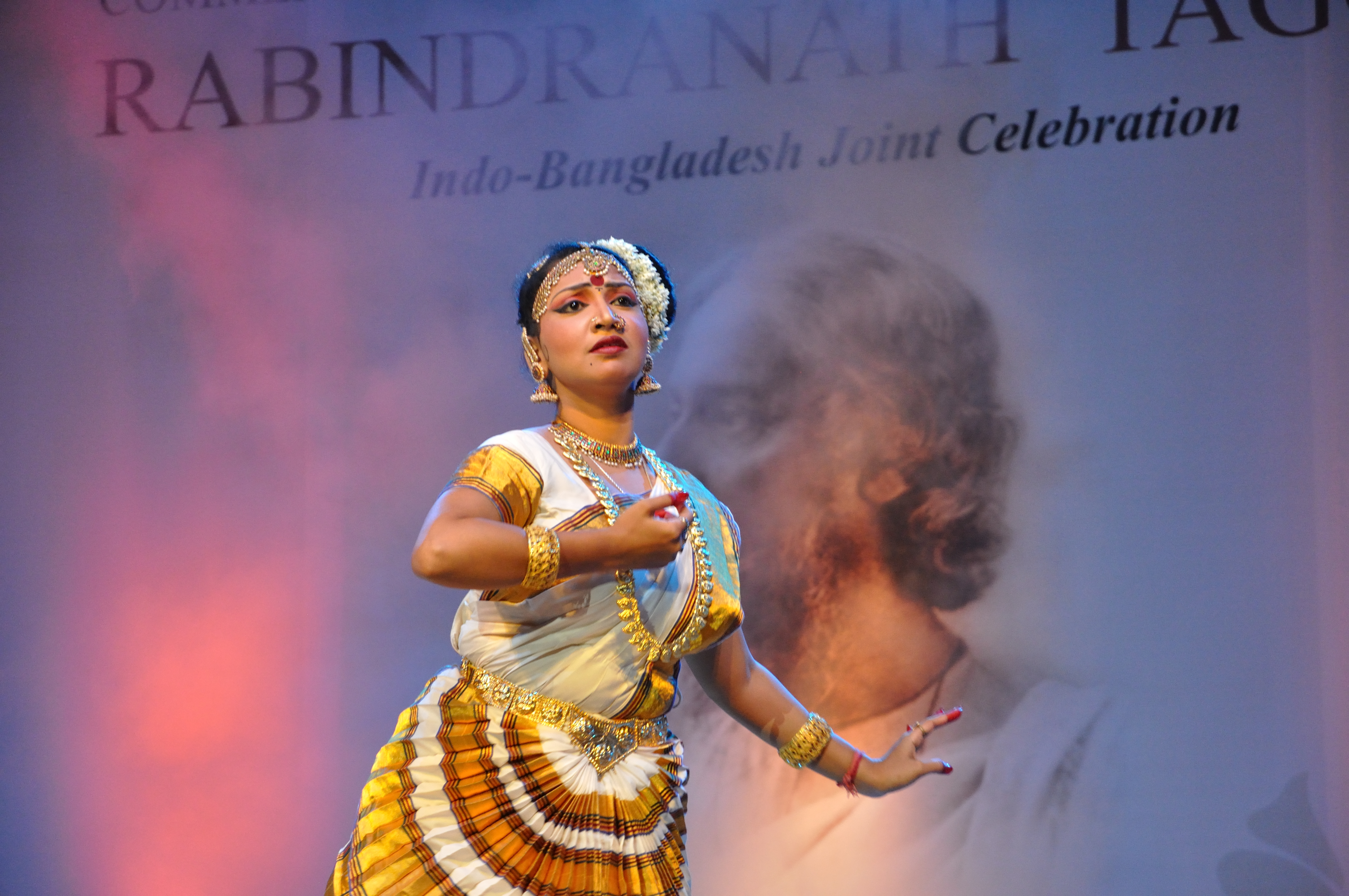
The Mohiniyattam is being performed to commemorate of 150th birth anniversary of Tagore. It was an Indo-Bangladesh joint celebration in 2011 in Kolkata.

West Bengal's capital Kolkata is the largest city of this region. The states of Odisha and West Bengal share a lot cultural and linguistic characteristics with Bangladesh and with the state of Assam. Together with Bangladesh, West Bengal forms the ethno-linguistic region of Bengal, which was also a unified administrative region until 1947.

Odissi is the oldest surviving classical dance, Pattachitra the most influential ancient classical painting, classical Odishian unique ancient architecture Kalinga architecture like Konark, Lingraja, lalitgiri etc. Odia is the only modern Indo-Aryan language accorded the status of a Classical Language in India, and Odissi music is claimed to be the classical Music among Karnatik and Hindustani Music.

== Other Regional Cultural Centres of India ==
- North Zone Cultural Centre, Patiala, Punjab
- North Central Zone Cultural Centre, Prayagraj, Uttar Pradesh
- West Zone Cultural Centre Udaipur, Rajasthan
- North East Zone Cultural Centre, Chümoukedima, Nagaland
- South Zone Cultural Centre
- South Central Zone Cultural Centre, Nagpur, Maharashtra

The Cultural Zones of India are seven overlapping zones defined by the Ministry of Culture of the Government of India to promote and preserve the cultural heritage of various regions of India.
