= South-Central Zone Cultural Centre =

- Dakṣiṇa-Madhya Kṣētra Sāṁskr̥tika Kēṁdra
- Abbreviation: SCZCC
- Formation: 1986-7
- Founder: Rajiv Gandhi
- Founded at: Nagpur
- Type: Zonal Cultural Centre
- Purpose: Education, preservation and promotion of arts and culture
- Location: Nagpur, India
- Official language: Hindi, English, Marathi, Telugu, Kannada, Konkani
- Chairman: Ramesh Bais
- Website: www.sczcc.gov.in

The South-Central Zone Cultural, Nagpur or SCZCC (ISO: Dakṣiṇa-Madhya Kṣētra Sāṁskr̥tika Kēṁdra) is one of the seven Zonal Cultural Centres in India established in 1986 with its headquarters at Nagpur. It comprises the linguistically different states of Andhra Pradesh, Karnataka, Madhya Pradesh, Telangana, Chhattisgarh, Goa and Maharashtra. Each of these States has rich traditions of folk, tribal, fine arts and crafts. The Centre strives through its various activities to enrich, promote and strengthen these traditions. The centre is working under the control of Ministry of Culture, Government of India. The Governor of Maharashtra is the chairman of this centre.

== Other Regional Cultural Centres of India ==
- East Zone Cultural Centre, Kolkata, West Bengal
- North-East Zone Culture Centre, Chümoukedima, Nagaland
- West Zone Cultural Centre, Udaipur, Rajasthan
- South Zone Culture Centre, Tanjavur, Tamil Nadu
- North Central Zone Cultural Centre, Allahabad, Uttar Pradesh
- North Zone Culture Centre, Patiala, Punjab

The Cultural Zones of India are seven overlapping zones defined by the Ministry of Culture of the Government of India to promote and preserve the cultural heritage of various regions of India.
