= Cultural Zones of India =

Zones defined by the Ministry of Culture of the Government of India

The Cultural Zones of India are seven overlapping zones defined by the Ministry of Culture of the Government of India to promote and preserve the cultural heritage of various regions of India. Each of these zones has been provided with a zonal centre. Most zonal centres were announced by the then-Prime Minister of India, Rajiv Gandhi, in 1985 and formally began functioning in the 1986–87 period. Their stated goal is "to strengthen the ancient roots of Indian culture and evolve and enrich composite national culture".

The city of Kolkata, formerly the capital of British India and West Bengal, is also known as the "Cultural Capital of India."

== The zones ==
Each zone has a zonal headquarters where a zonal cultural center has been established. Several states have membership in multiple zones, but no state subdivisions are utilized in the zonal divisions. In addition to promoting the culture of the zones they are responsible for, each zonal center also works to cross-promote and create exposure to other cultural zones of India by organizing functions and inviting artistes from other zones.

Cultural Zones of India (India)

Zone	Zonal Centre	Extent
North Culture Zone	North Zone Cultural Centre, Patiala, Punjab	Chandigarh, Haryana, Himachal Pradesh, Jammu and Kashmir, Ladakh, Punjab, Rajasthan, Uttarakhand
North Central Culture Zone	North-Central Zone Cultural Centre, Prayagraj, Uttar Pradesh	Bihar, Delhi, Haryana, Madhya Pradesh, Rajasthan, Uttar Pradesh, Uttarakhand
East Culture Zone	East Zone Cultural Centre, Kolkata, West Bengal	Andaman and Nicobar Islands, Assam, Bihar, Jharkhand, Manipur, Odisha, Sikkim, Tripura, West Bengal
North East Culture Zone	North East Zone Cultural Centre, Chümoukedima, Nagaland	Arunachal Pradesh, Assam, Manipur, Meghalaya, Mizoram, Nagaland, Sikkim, Tripura
South Culture Zone	South Zone Cultural Centre, Thanjavur, Tamil Nadu	Andaman and Nicobar Islands, Andhra Pradesh, Karnataka, Kerala, Lakshadweep, Puducherry, Tamil Nadu, Telangana
South Central Culture Zone	South-Central Zone Cultural Centre, Nagpur, Maharashtra	Andhra Pradesh, Chhattisgarh, Goa, Karnataka, Madhya Pradesh, Maharashtra, Telangana
West Culture Zone	West Zone Cultural Centre, Udaipur, Rajasthan	Dadra and Nagar Haveli and Daman and Diu, Goa, Gujarat, Maharashtra, Rajasthan

== See also ==
- Zonal Councils of India, five administrative zones in India
- Earthquake zones of India
- List of special economic zones in India
- List of ecoregions in India, 46 ecoregions in India
- Administrative divisions of India
