= Shilpgram, Udaipur =

Indian arts and crafts complex

Shilpgram
- Location within Rajasthan
- Location: Udaipur, Rajasthan
- Coordinates: 24.612290°N 73.661913°E
- Type: Craft Village

Shilpgram is a rural arts and crafts complex, situated 3 km (1.9 mi) west of the city of Udaipur, Rajasthan state, India. The center is spread over an undulating terrain of about 70 acres of land, surrounded by the Aravali mountains. Shilpgram is an ethnographic museum that depicts the lifestyles of the folk and tribal people of the region. With an objective of increasing awareness and knowledge about the rural arts and crafts, the Shilpgram provides opportunity for rural and urban artists to come together and interact through the process of camps and workshops.

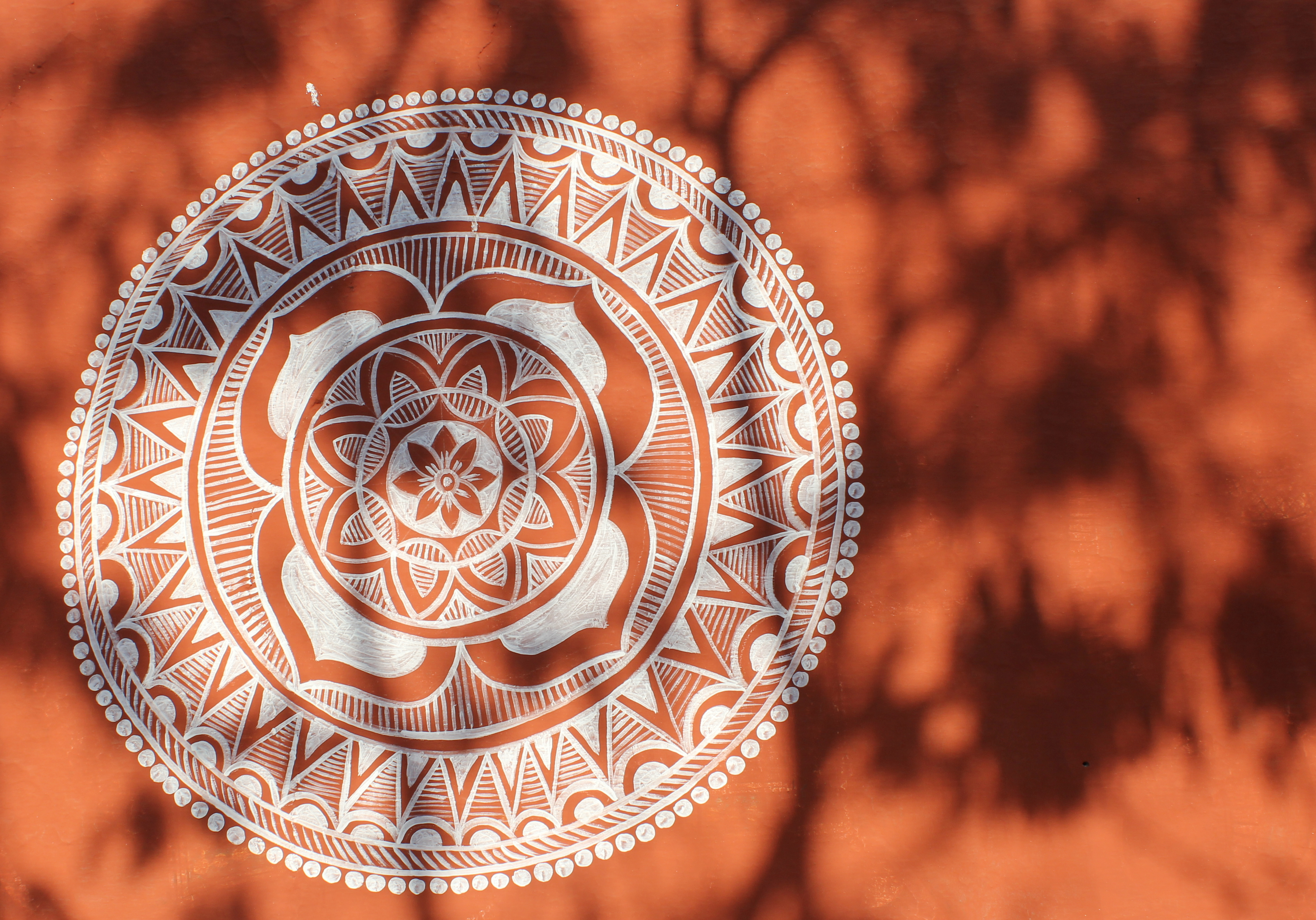
Madana Work Art at Shilpgram

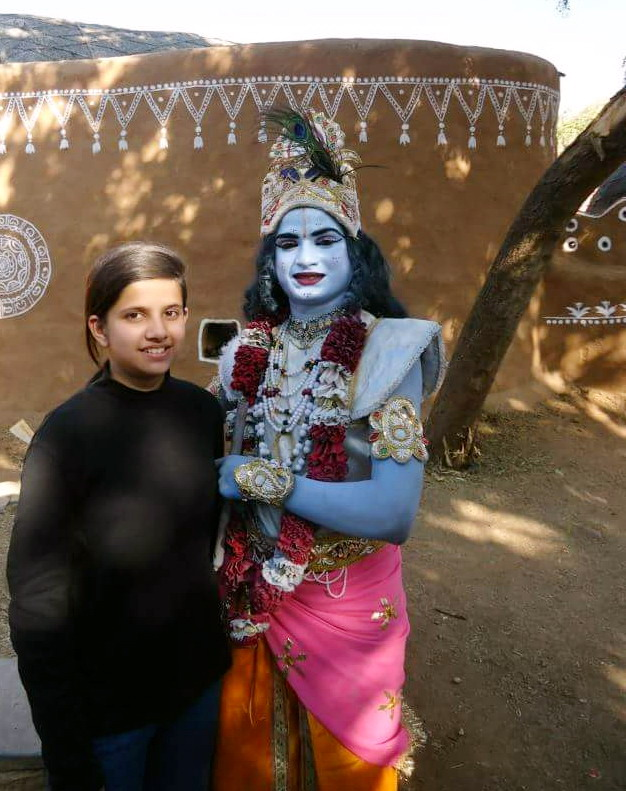
Shilpgram Udaipur

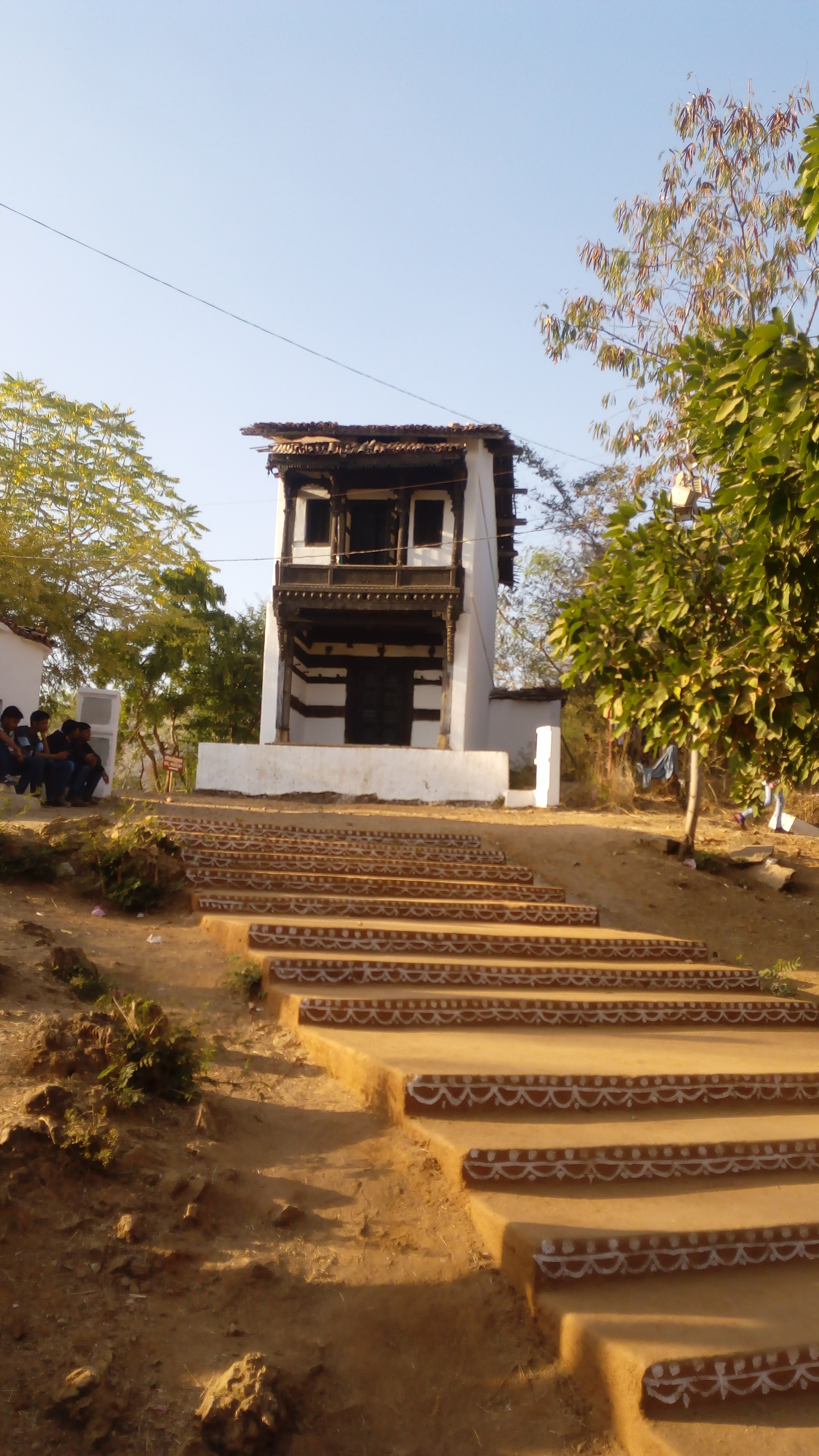
A small hut at Shilpgram

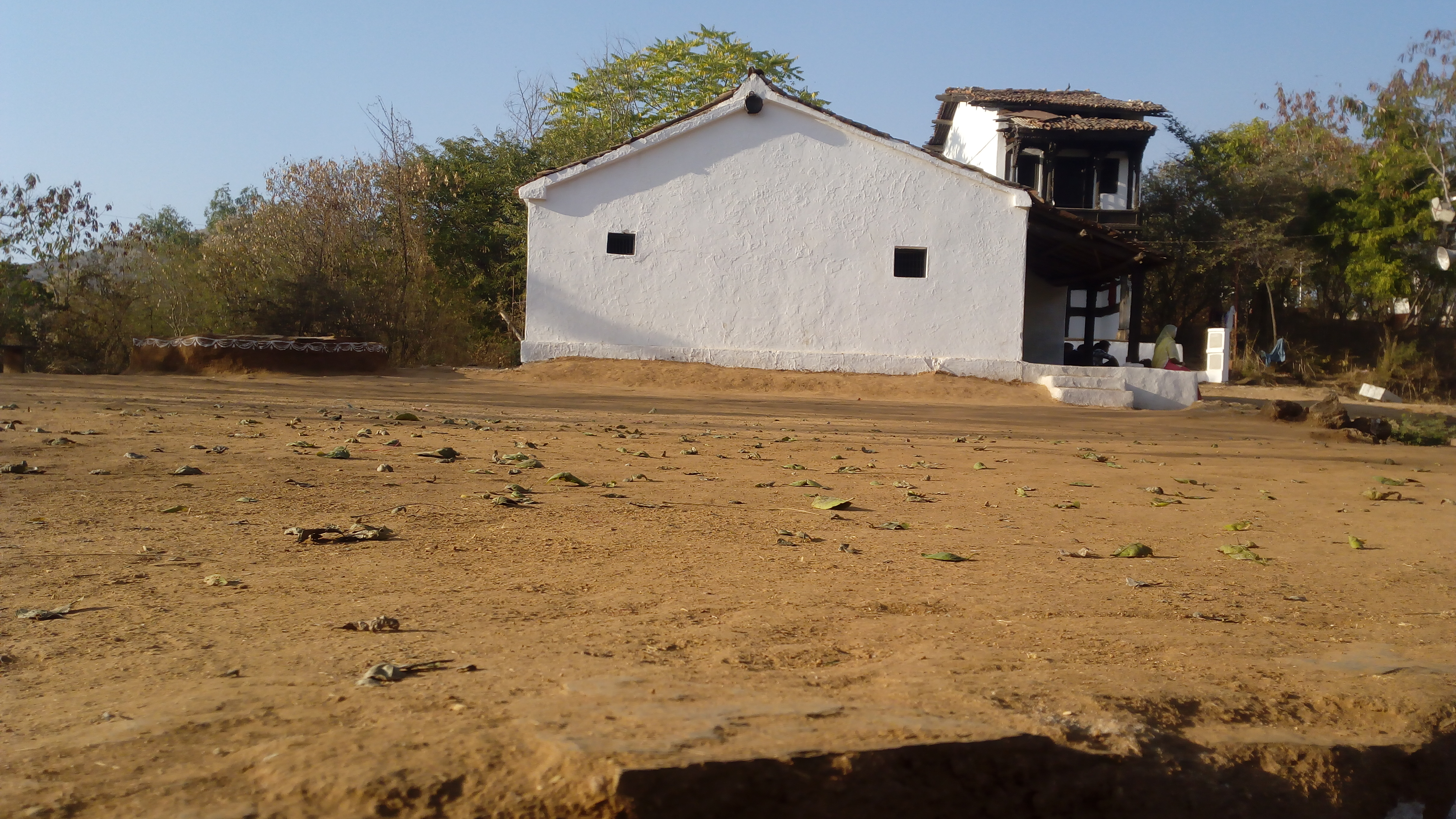
A village hut at Shilpgram, Udaipur

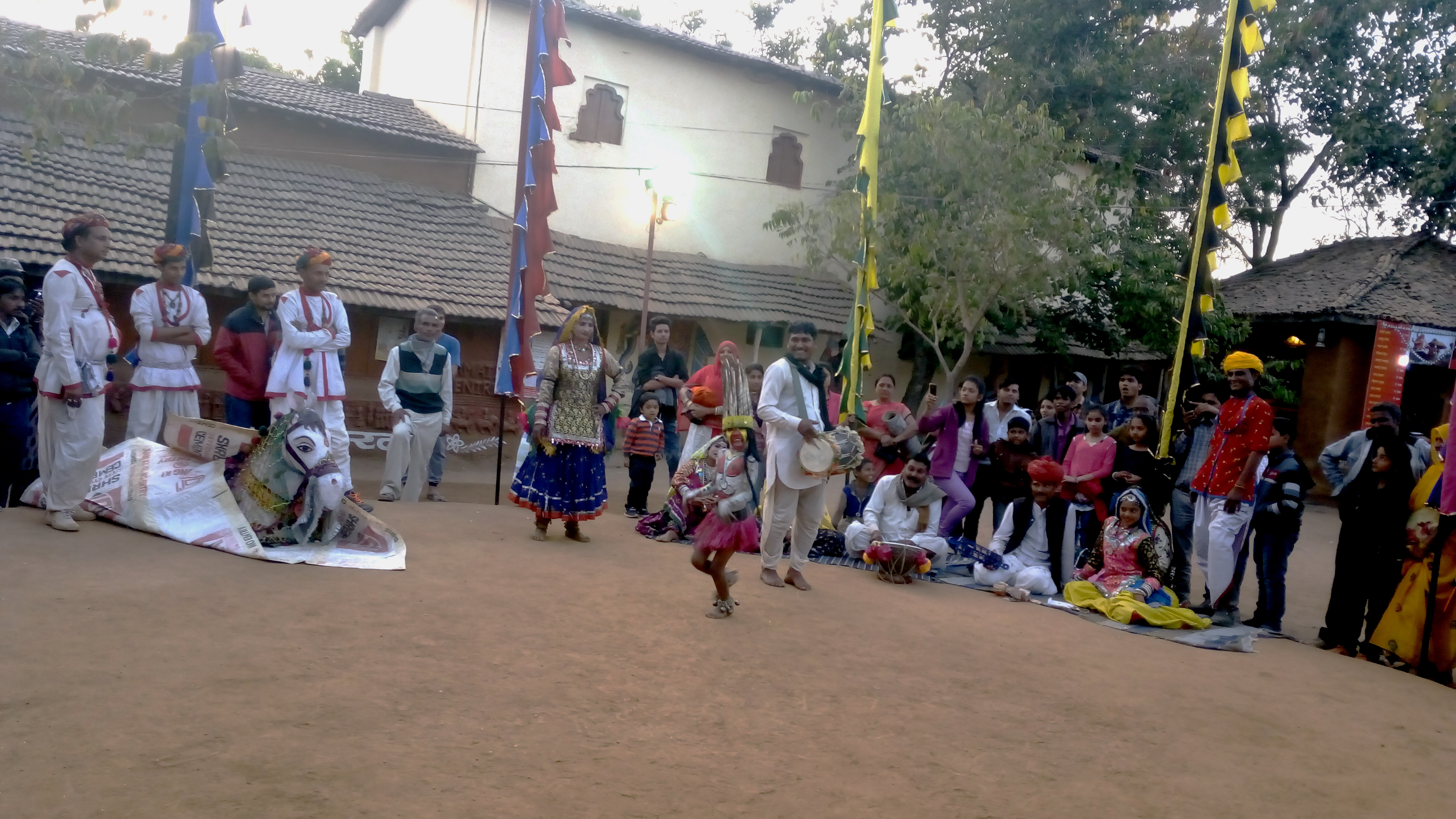
Artists Performing at Shilpgram, Udaipur

== Description ==
The Complex has an open-air Amphitheatre with a seating capacity of approximately 8000, used for the major theatre festivals held here, and the traditional folk performing arts. Each member state of the West Zone has traditional huts built within the Shilpgram, derivative of certain basic occupations fundamental to the way of life of the people of the area and also central to the culture of the country. In these traditional huts, household articles of everyday use, like terracotta, textile, wooden and metal items, decorative objects and implements are featured with appropriate signage and explanatory details with the objective to give a realistic glimpse of the people and their belongings.

The huts are constructed around an interlocking occupational theme. In this integrated pattern are five huts from Rajasthan, representing the weavers' community from Marwar, pottery from the hilly areas of Mewar and the tribal farmer communities of the Bhil and the Sehariyas. Apart from the state's own representation, there are seven representative huts from the state of Gujarat, five from the state of Maharashtra and five featuring the arts and crafts of Goa.

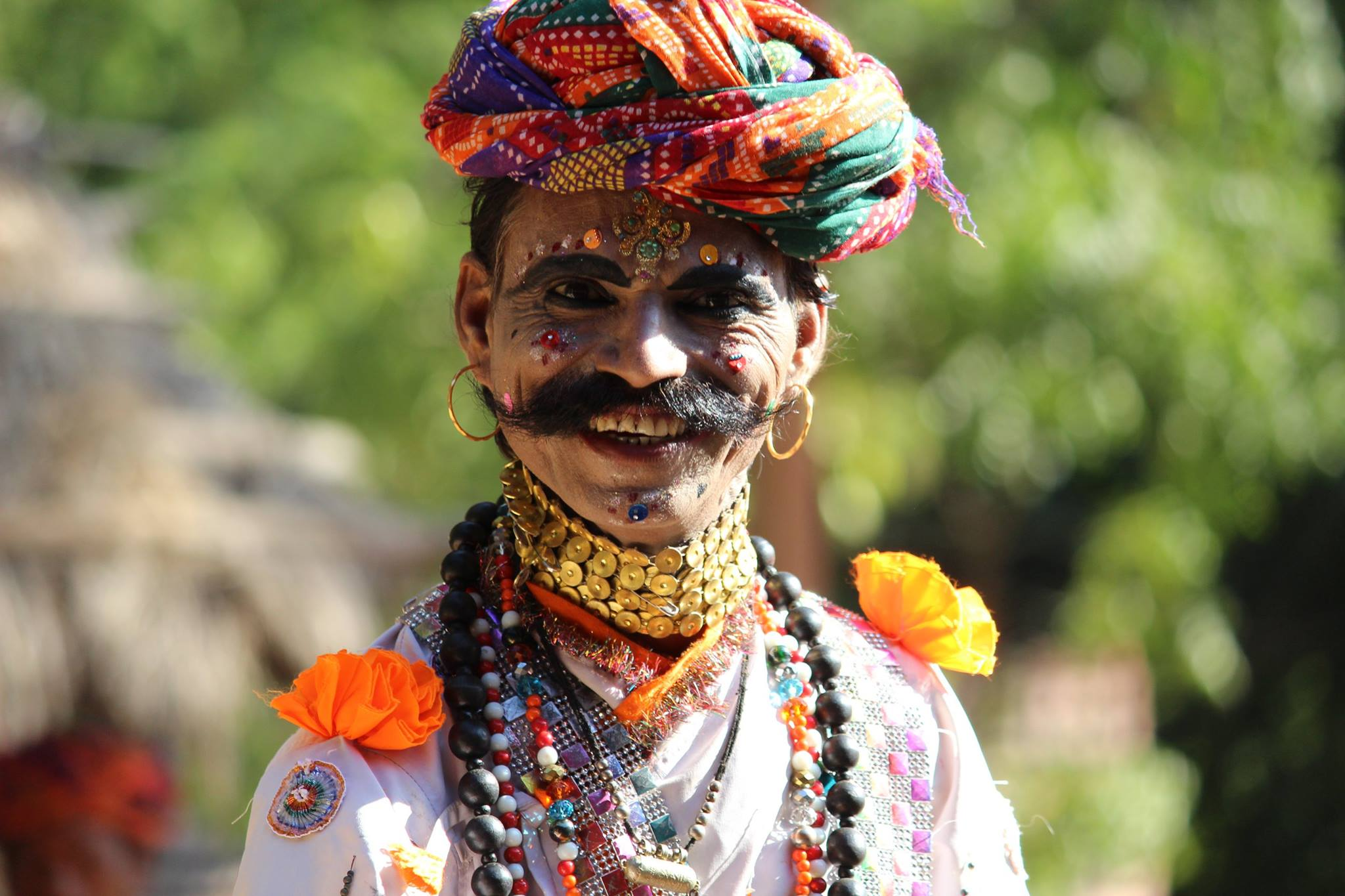
Rural artists - Every Year in 10 December Days ShilpGram Festival and many artists from PAN India come here to perform.

== Shilpgram Festival ==
The Shilpgram Festival is organised every year from 21 December to 31 December. The Shilpgram Fair (Shilpgram Mela), a part of the festive celebrations, serves as a destination for handwoven clothes, embroideries, mirror works and handicrafts. The Mela aids in encouraging the urban potters, visual artists and designers and the cottage industry of Rajasthan. The Festival provides opportunities for learning the craft skills through various workshops. Cultural programmes during the evening and the local food stalls attract many visitors and locals.

== Shilpdarshan ==
Shilpdarshan is a continuing activity at Shilpgram in which traditional performing artists and craftsmen are used to draw from the interior villages of the member states. They are regularly invited to exhibit their skill and to demonstrate their crafts, and sell their works in order to have direct access to the buyers. This programme has been initiated with an aim to encourage rural craftsmen and performers.

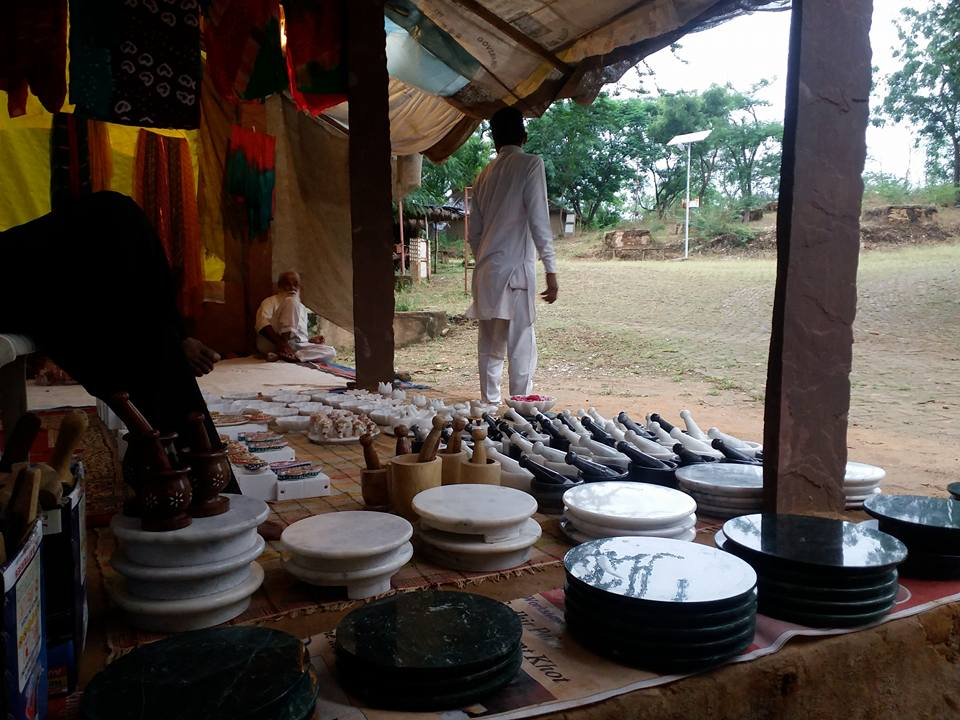
Handicrafts shops at ShilpGram Udaipur.

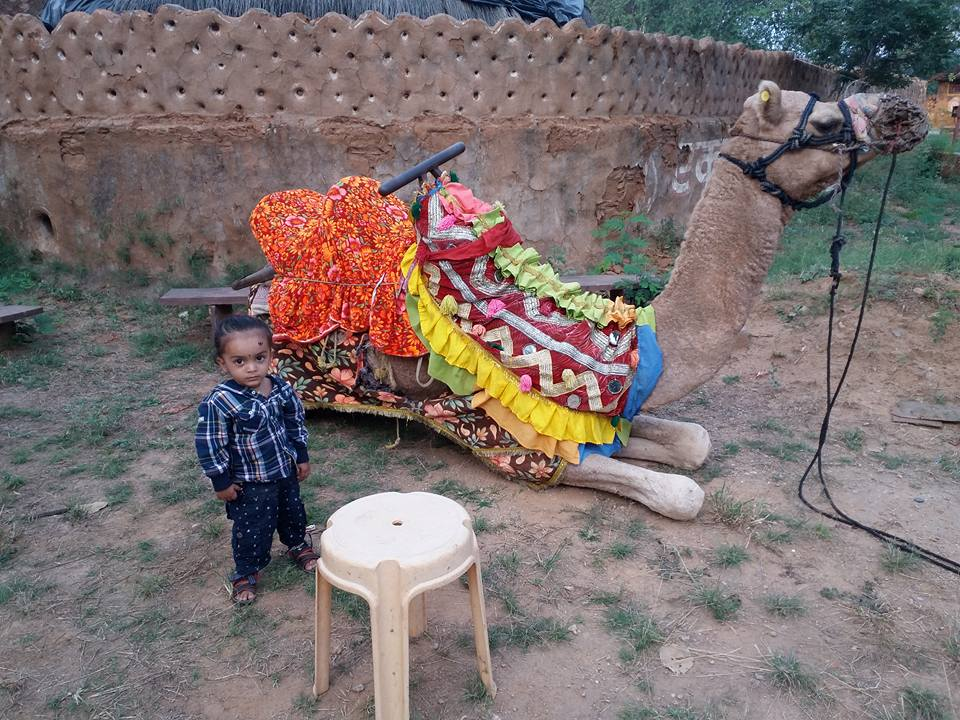
At Shilpgram tourists came and camel ride also.

== See also ==
- Tourist attractions in Udaipur
- Culture of Rajasthan
- Shilpgram, Sawai Madhopur
- West Zone Cultural Centre
