= South Zone Cultural Centre =

- Formation: 1986-87
- Type: Autonomous organization
- Purpose: Education, preservation and promotion of arts and culture
- Location: Thanjavur, Tamil Nadu, India
- Owner: Ministry of Culture
- Website: www.szccindia.org

The South Zone Culture Centre (abbreviated as SZCC) is an autonomous organisation of the Ministry of Culture (India) Govt of India. It is one of the seven Zonal Cultural Centres established by the Indian Government in 1986 to preserve and promote traditional cultural heritage in India.

Each zonal center also works to cross-promote and create exposure to other cultural zones of India by organizing functions and inviting artistes from other zones. The current Chairman of the SZCC is the Hon' Governor of Tamil Nadu, Shri R. N. Ravi, and the Director is K.K. Gopalakrishnan, a well-known cultural historian, author and Tagore National Scholar. The South Zone Cultural Centre (SZCC) is one of the seven Zonal Cultural Zones in India defined and provided with administrative infrastructure by the Government of India.

== Member states of the SZCC ==
- Andhra pradesh
- Andaman and Nicobar islands
- Karnataka
- Kerala
- Lakshadweep
- Pudhucherry
- Tamil Nadu
- Telangana

== Other Regional Cultural Centres of India ==
- East Zone Cultural Centre, Kolkata
- North Zone Cultural Centre, Patiala, Punjab
- West Zone Cultural Centre Udaipur, Rajasthan
- North East Zone Cultural Centre, Chümoukedima, Nagaland
- South-Central Zone Cultural Centre, Nagpur, Maharashtra
- North Central Zone Cultural Centre, Prayagraj
