= North Central Zone Cultural Centre =

Government agency for cultural promotion

NCZCC
- North Central Zone Cultural Centre
- Uttara Madhya Kṣētra Sāṁskr̥tika Kēṁdra
- Formation: March 11, 1986; 40 years ago
- Type: Zonal Cultural Centre
- Purpose: Education, preservation and promotion of art and culture
- Headquarters: Prayagraj
- Location: Prayagraj, India
- Chairperson: Anandiben Patel

North Central Zone Cultural Centre or NCZCC (ISO: Uttara Madhya Kṣētra Sāṁskr̥tika Kēṁdra) is one of the seven cultural zones of India established by the Ministry of Human Resource Development, Government of India. Formed on 11 March 1986, it was the third cultural zone to be established by the ministry, after North Zone Cultural Centre and East Zone Cultural Centre.

== Aim ==
Just like the other six cultural zones, the objective of the NCZCC is to promote arts, crafts, traditions and cultural heritage in the states of Bihar, Haryana, Madhya Pradesh, Rajasthan, Uttarakhand and Uttar Pradesh, and the union territory of Delhi. The broad disciplines that the cultural zone targets are music, drama, painting and literature.

== Other Regional Cultural Centres of India ==
- East Zone Cultural Centre, Kolkata
- North Zone Cultural Centre, Patiala
- North East Zone Cultural Centre, Chümoukedima, Nagaland
- West Zone Cultural Centre Udaipur
- South Zone Cultural Centre, Tanjavur
- South-Central Zone Cultural Centre, Nagpur, Maharashtra
