= National Museum Institute of the History of Art, Conservation and Museology =

Indian Institute of Heritage
- Former names: National Museum Institute of the History of Art, Conservation and Museology
- Type: Deemed University
- Established: 27 January 1989; 37 years ago
- Affiliations: UGC
- Vice-Chancellor: Dr. Buddh Rashmi Mani
- Location: Janpath, New Delhi, India; 77°12′32″N 28°36′50″E
- Campus: National Museum Campus
- Nickname: NMIHACM
- Website: NMI

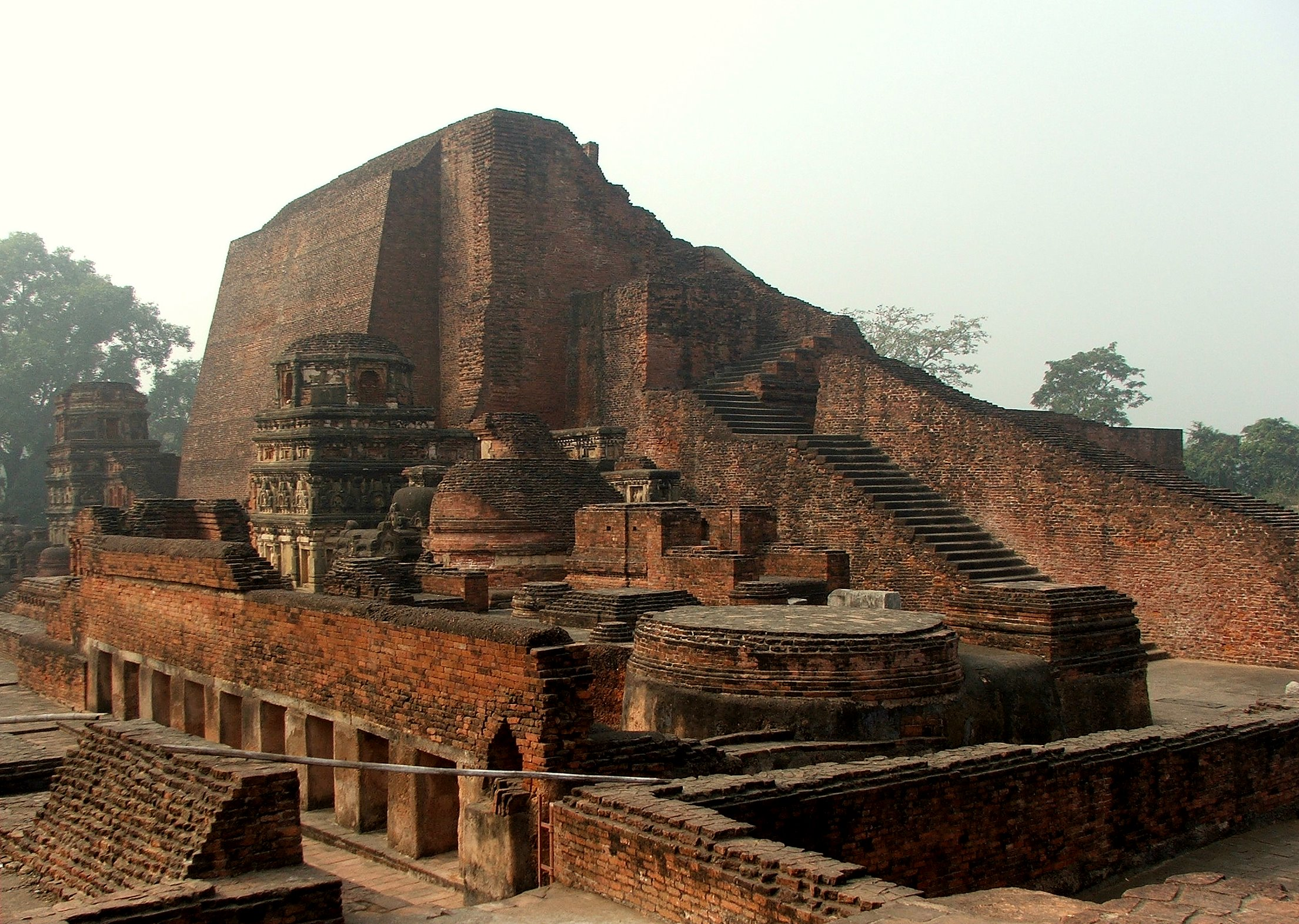
Nalanda is considered one of the first great universities in recorded history. It was the centre of Buddhist learning and research in the world from 450 to 1193 CE.

The Indian Institute of Heritage, formerly The National Museum Institute of the History of Art, Conservation and Museology (NMIHACM) is an autonomous institute, a seat of higher education in the fields of History, Conservation and Museology under the Ministry of culture, Government of India. The institute is a deemed university and is located at Noida.

== Profile ==
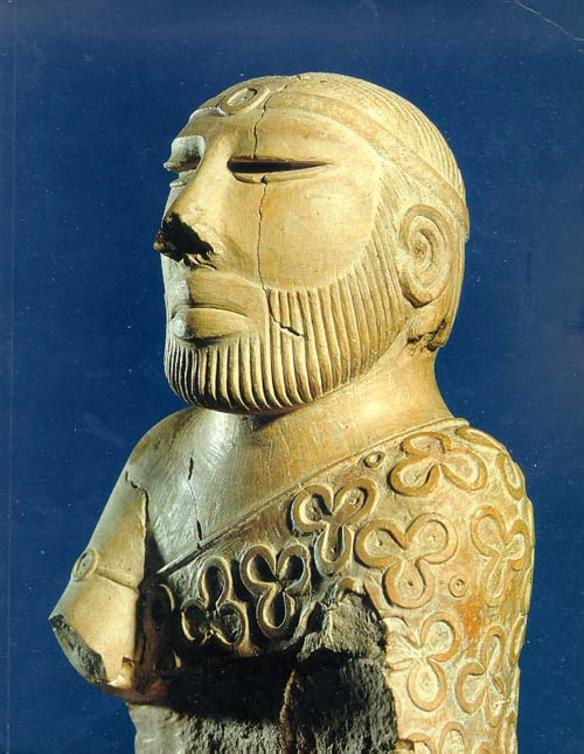
"Priest King" of Indus Valley Civilisation

The National Museum Institute of the History of Art, Conservation and Museology was established on 27 January 1989, under the Societies Registration Act by the Ministry of Culture, Government of India for providing facilities for advanced studies and research in the field of art and cultural heritage. The institute was given the status of a deemed university by the Ministry of Human Resource Development on 28 April 1989.

NMIHACM has now positioned itself as the premier institute of its kind in India and is located within the premises of the National Museum in New Delhi. The institute has been offering study opportunities at the diploma, Masters and Doctoral levels since 1985 on various aspects such as history, conservation and restoration and museology.

== Objectives ==
The main objectives of NMI are set as:

- Providing for various courses of study, training and research in different branches of History of art, Museology, Conservation, etc.
- Collaborating with other national institutions dealing with cultural property, like the National Museum, Archaeological Survey of India, Anthropological Survey of India, National Gallery of Modern Art, National Archives of India and the like, in order to share the material, curatorial / technical expertise and facilities; Interacting on a continuing basis at the national level to improve standards of teaching in the above fields.
- Providing academic guidance and leadership.
- Publishing such works of the Institute as may have contributed substantially to the fields of specialization.

== Departments ==
Restoration by physical chemical means

The institute's functions are broadly divided into three areas and each area is managed by a dedicated department.

Archeology: The Department of Archaeology focuses on the interdisciplinary and multidisciplinary study of archaeology, covering areas such as prehistory, protohistory, historical archaeology, field archeology, and the development of art and architecture. The department also undertakes archeological research and excavation projects.

History of Art: The department of History of Art is dedicated to the study and research of Indian and global art and architecture history, including the development, interpretation and understanding of art and visual culture across different era and regions.

Conservation: The Department of Conservation focuses on the scientific and technical study, preservation and conversation of art object and cultural heritage. Its activities include conversation research, technical studies, consultancy and the development of conversation facilities and resources.

Museology: The Department of Museology focuses on study of museums, muesology, museography and museum management. It is distinctive in functioning within the museum premises, providing students with opportunity for practical exposure alongside academic study. The department contributes to museum studies and research through original research, professional training in museum education and exhibitions, and collaborative initiatives for the promotion of the museums and persevering the tangible and intangible heritage.

Palaeography, Epigraphy and Numismatics: The Department focuses on the study and research of ancient and historical scripts, inscriptions, and royal currency (coin) covering both Indian and world traditions. The department was established at IIH 2023.

== Projects ==
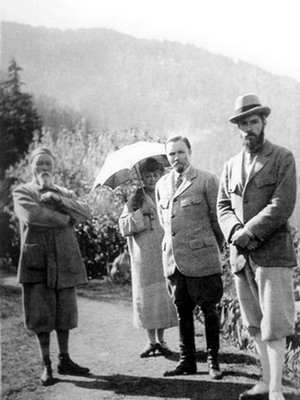
Roerich's family. (Kullu valley, India).

NMIHACM undertakes various projects with regard to heritage conservation across the country; some of them are:

- Documentation of Intangible Cultural Heritage: Based on inventories in the Ladakh and Western Uttar Pradesh Region.
- A school-based project for establishing Museum Corners in schools of Nubra, Thangtse and Khaltsa regions of Ladakh and Meerut in Western Uttar Pradesh.
- Yuva Saathi: An action research project involving young volunteers aimed at the young visitors of the National Museum.
- Museum extends to Hospital: Installation of paintings in the paedatric wards of the All India Institute of Medical Sciences (AIIMS),

Delhi.

- Documentation of Nine Masters: Digital documentation of the works of Nicholas Roerich, the Russian painter who lived in India.
- Museum Accessibility and Visitor Studies: A survey of the main art museums in India such as the National Museum, the National Gallery of Modern Art and the Handicrafts and Textile Museum.
- Indian Life and Landscapes by Western Artists: Visitor access studies of the exhibition conducted at Chatrapati Shivaji Maharaj Vastu Sanghralaya, Mumbai, 27 January 2009.

== Exhibitions ==
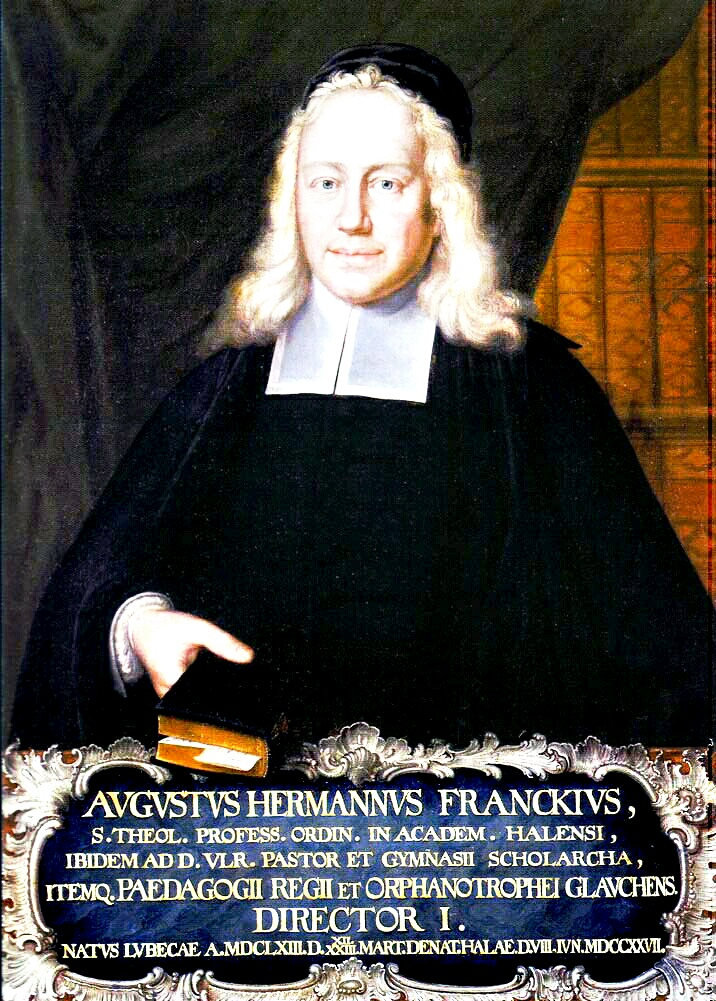
August Hermann Francke

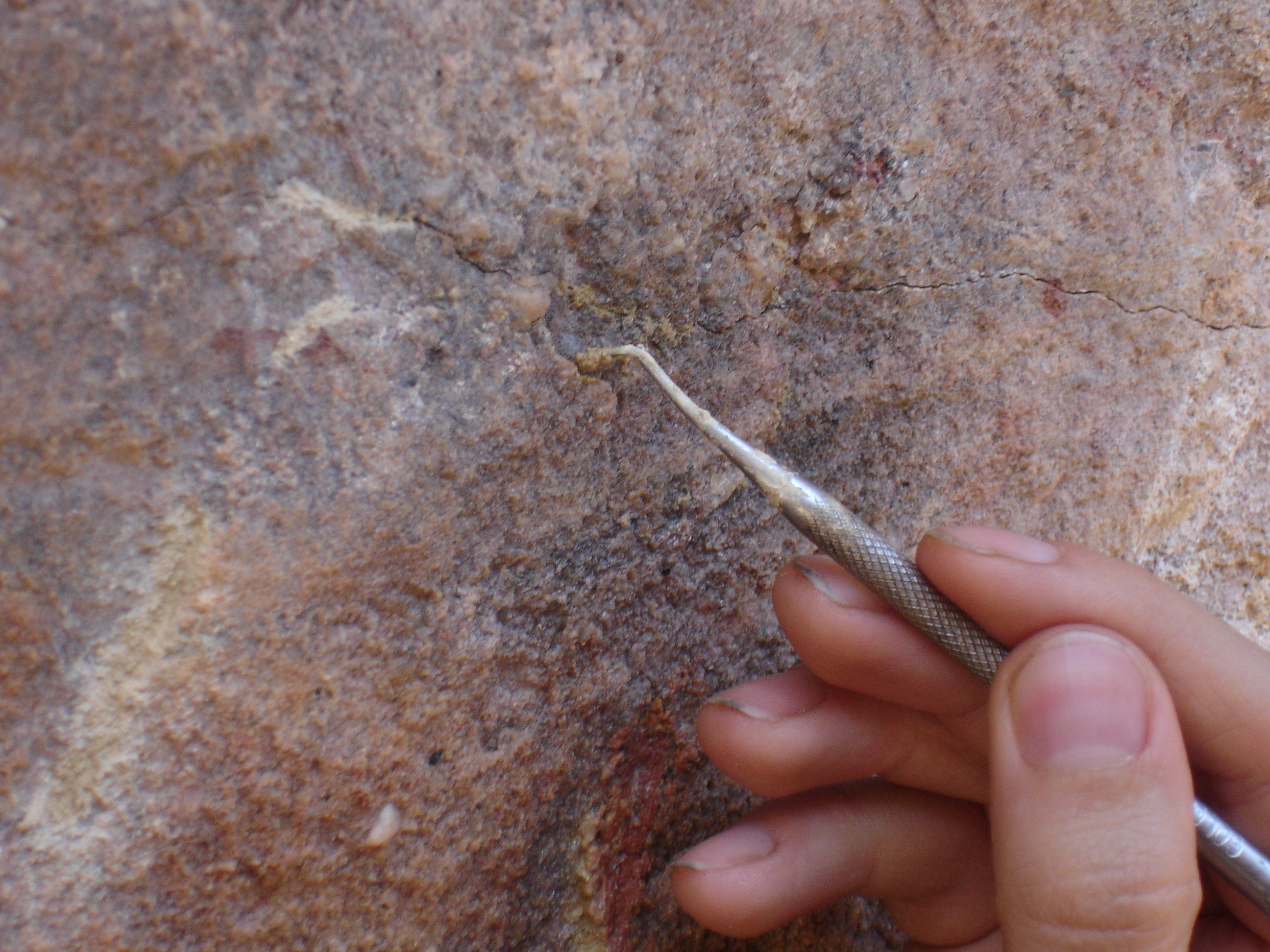
Preventive conservation on a rock wall

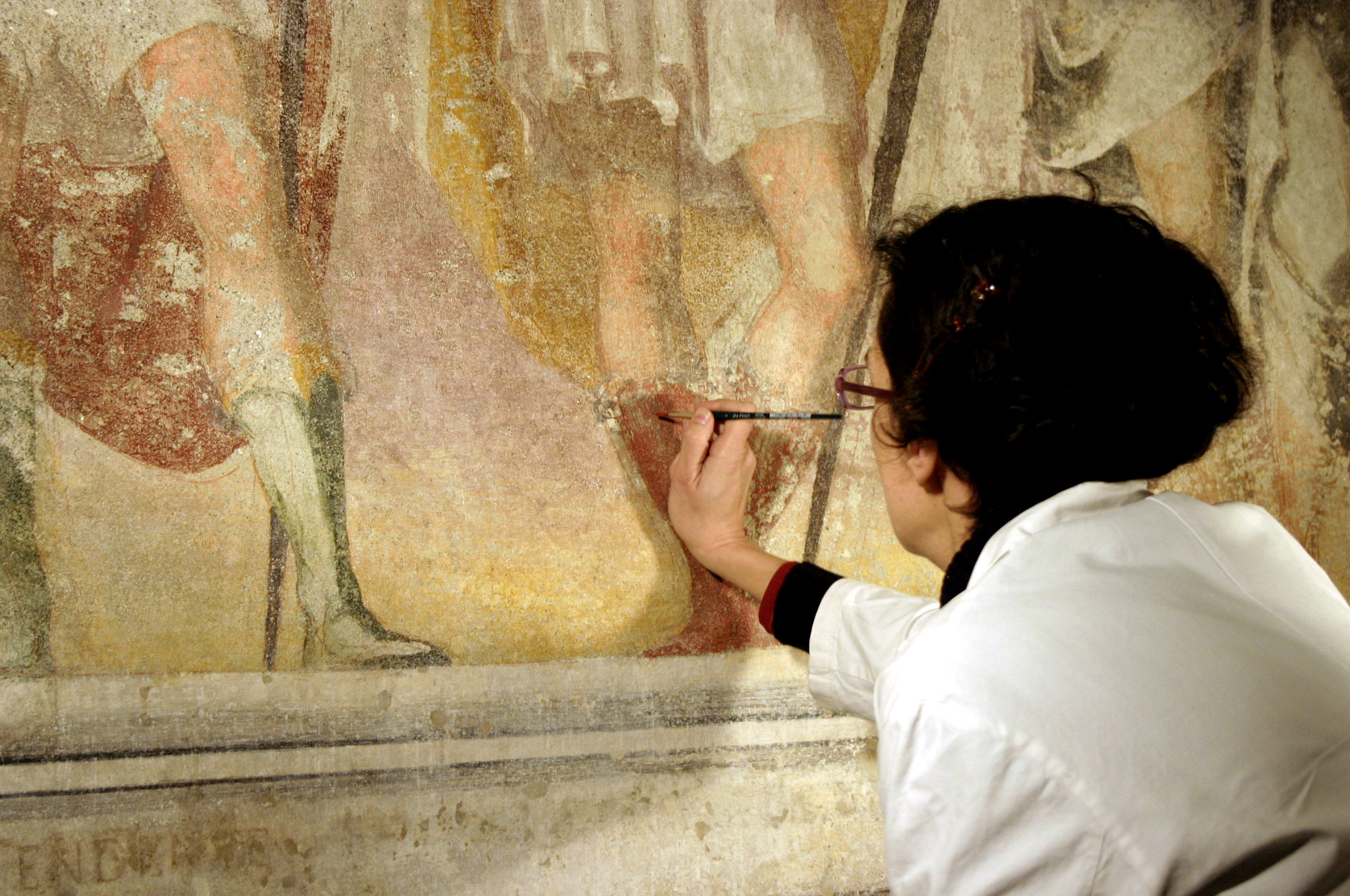
A restorer at work.

NMIHACM, through its Department of Museology, has organised several exhibitions, covering various topics under History and conservation.

- First Frames - In the Footsteps of Early Explorers : A month long photo exhibition on Western Himalayas, based on the explorations of Li Gotami, Lama Anagarika Govinda, and August Hermann Francke on 1 September 2012.
- Nako – Living cultural heritage in the Western Himalayas : Photo exhibition in collaboration with the Department of Museology and Conservation and Austria Embassy on 18 March 2011.
- Astitav- a quest for Identity : Exhibition jointly organised at Children's Museum, Siri Fort, New Delhi with the Archaeological Survey of India in August 2008.
- Astitav- a Search for Our Identity : Exhibition on monuments and their degradation in February 2008.
- Exhibition of the photo collections of J. Ph. Vogel, Kern Institute, Leiden in March 2008.
- Prabhava Photo and Object Exhibition on Indian art and ots foreign influences in 2004.
- Ehasas: Senses and Images : Exhibition for the visually impaired in November 2002.

== Courses ==
NMIHACM offers Five courses at Masters level; MA in History of Arts, MA in Conservation and MA in Museology. All the three programs are two year full-time Masters courses and offer higher studies in the respective areas of study. A limited number of Government scholarships are available for all the courses.

NMIHACM offers doctoral research facilities for PhD in:

- Museum Education
- Museum Exhibition and Communication
- Eco-Museums
- Museum Documentation
- Archeology.
- Epigraphy.

The Institute organises internal and external lecture series and seminars for the research scholars.

NMIHACM also conducts a few short-term courses on India Art and culture, Art Appreciation and Bhartiya Kalanidhi (Hindi Medium).

== Library ==
NMIHACM has access to a well stocked library maintained at National Museum Institute which is equipped with a fully automated digital library consisting of 68,014 slides, apart from the hard copy collections. Many journals subscribed by the library is also accessible to NMIHACM.

== Publications ==
The Institute regularly releases important publications on History, conservation and Museology, some of the more notable ones are:

- Prof. Anupa Pande & Parul Pandya Dhar (2004). Cultural Interface of India with Asia : Religion, Art and Architecture. NMIHACM. ISBN 978-8124602621.
- Prof. Arputharani Sengupta (2005). God & King: The Devaraja Cult in South Asian Art & Architecture. NMIHACM. ISBN 978-8189233266.
- K. K. Gupta (2006). Restoration of Indian Miniature Paintings. NMIHACM. ISBN 9788172112042.
- Pande, Anupa & Savita Kumari (2011). The Heritage of Haider Ali and Tipu Sultan: Art and Architecture. NMIHACM. ISBN 978-8173053948.
- Lalonde, Christne, Mary Simon and Anupa Pande. Sanaugavut: Inuit Art from the Canadian Arctic. NMIHACM. OCLC 719419294.
- Pande, Anupa (2009). The Art of Central Asia and the Indian Subcontinent in Cross - Cultural Perspective. NMIHACM. ISBN 978-8173053474.
- Pant, G.N. Indus Valley Civilisation. NMIHACM.
- Joshi, J.P. & R. S. Bisht (1994). India and the Indus Civilisation. NMIHACM.
- Kaur, Jasvinder (1992). The Mauryan Art (Indian Art of the third century BC). NMIHACM.

== Example of an archaeological discovery and restoration of a mural painting ==
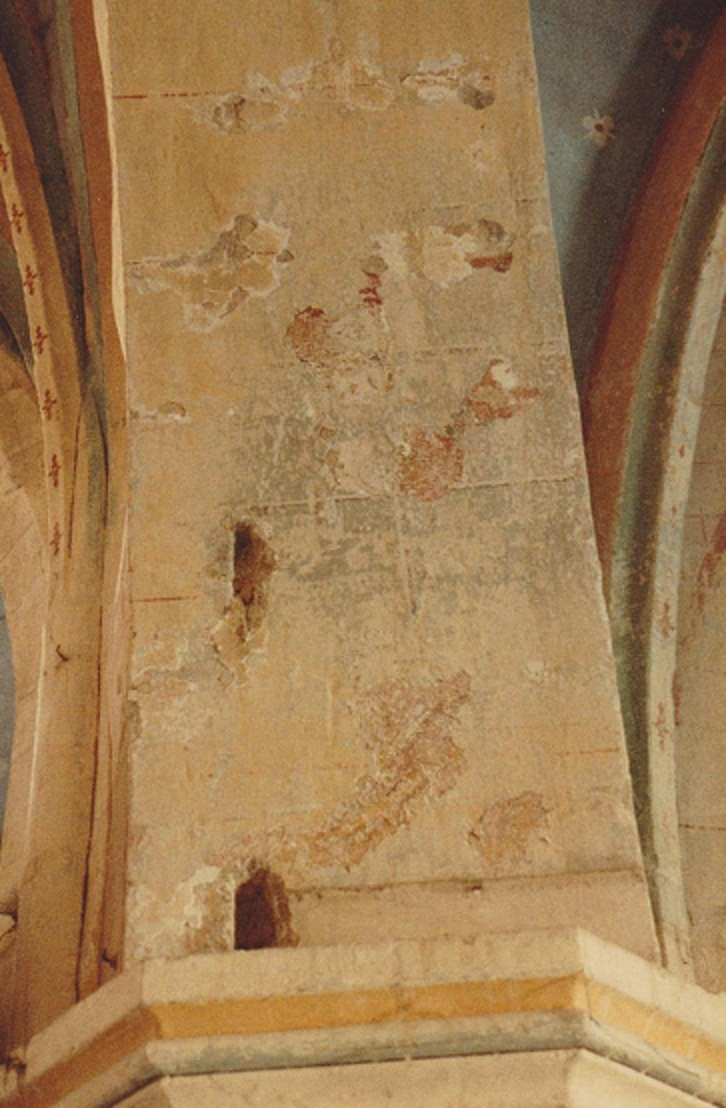
First archaeological search in the 19th-century layer by French archaeologist and restorer Yves Morvan

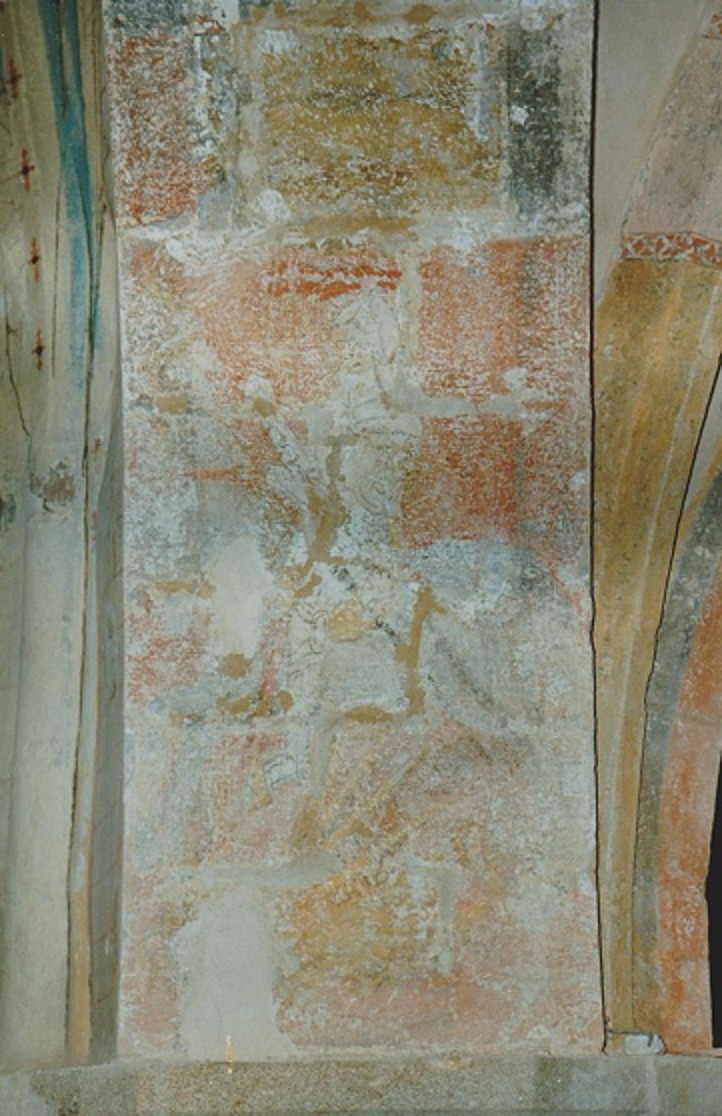
Painting of the 15th century cleared before restoration

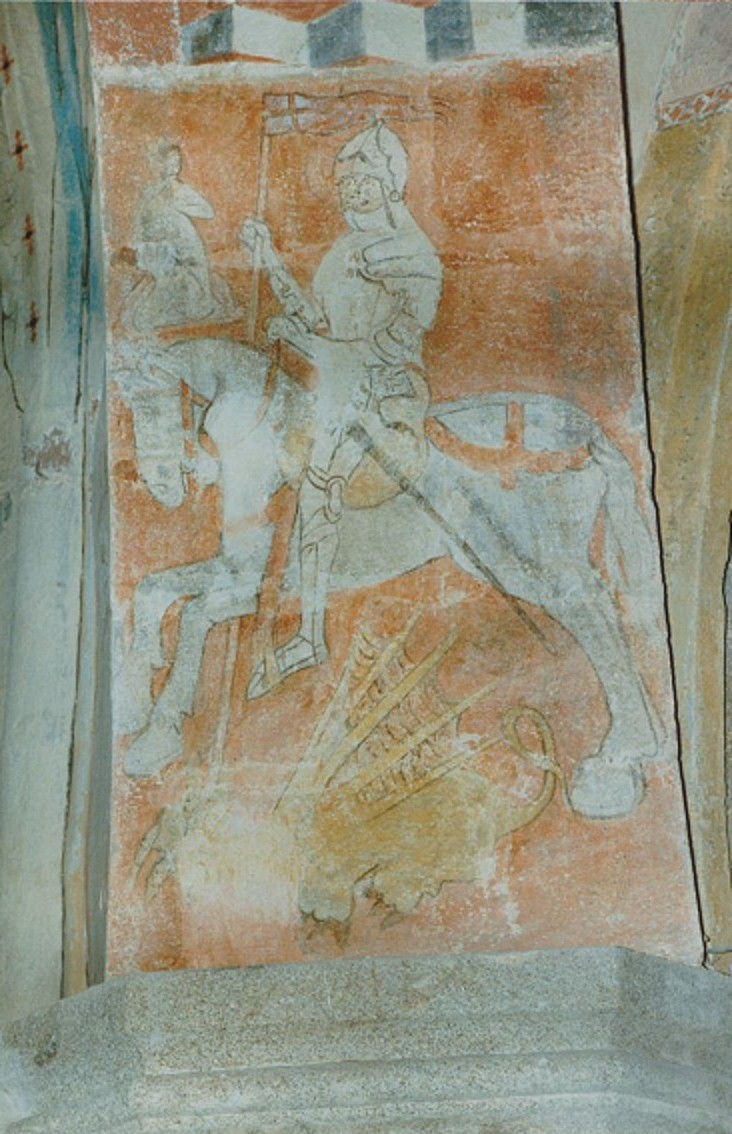
Painting after restoration
