= Shilpgram, Sawai Madhopur =

Shilpgram
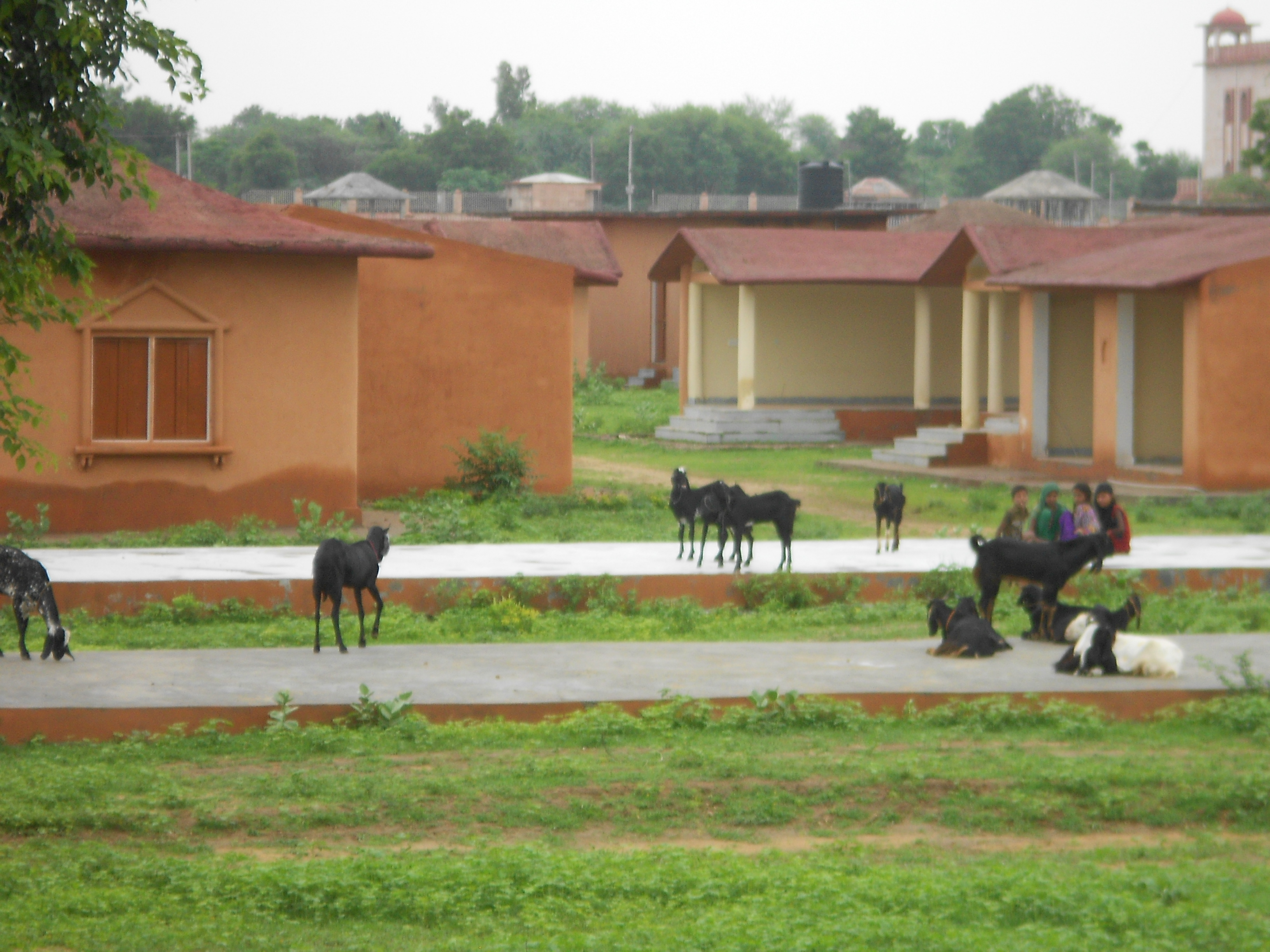
- Shilpgram, Ranthambhore

- Location within Rajasthan
- Established: 2013
- Location: Ramsinghpura, Sawai Madhopur, India
- Coordinates: 26.01733°N 76.50257°E
- Type: Craft Village
- Curator: ACCESS Development Services

The Shilpgram Museum is a craft village, situated near Ramsinghpura village, 9 km from Sawai Madhopur in India. It is a living ethnographic museum depicting the tremendous diversity in crafts, art and culture of various Indian states, especially the western part.

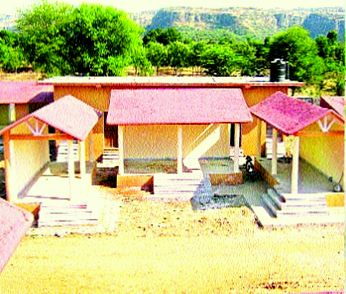
Shilpgram, Sawai Madhopur

== Description ==
The foundation stone-laying ceremony of Shilpgram, Sawai Madhopur, Rajasthan, was done by Bina Kak, former Hon'ble Tourism, Art, Culture, Forest and Environment Minister of Rajasthan on 26 April 2013.

Shilpgram got renovated in 2017 and is being an attractive destination for tourists where the local crafts lure the tourist to spend some time in the tranquility of Ranthambhore. Spreading over 22 acres in land, Shilpgram is a platform where regional handicraft and hand-loom products is developed. Like other Shilpgrams, for example, Udaipur Shilpgram, tourist interest as well as public utility exhibitions and craft bazaars of handicrafts and handlooms are organized by Shilpgram. Sometimes to showcase their regional cultural heritage, they also organize cultural events.

== See also ==
- Rajiv Gandhi Regional Museum of Natural History, Sawai Madhopur
- Ranthambore National Park
- Ranthambore Fort
- Sawai Madhopur railway station
