= Central Reference Library =

National Bibliographic Agency

Central Reference Library is an Indian National Bibliographic Agency in Kolkata which run under Ministry of Culture of India. It provides bibliographic services to scholars, universities, institutions and government agencies. This library has started doing digitalization of rare and old books and documents. It receives three published book from any publisher of India as per provision of Delivery of Books and Newspapers Act 1956.

== History ==
It was established in 1955 in the campus of National Library of India as National Bibliographic and Documentation Centre.
