= West Zone Cultural Centre =

- Formation: 1986
- Type: Zonal Cultural Centre
- Purpose: Education, preservation and promotion of arts and culture
- Location: Udaipur, Rajasthan, India
- Website: www.wzccindia.com

The West Zone Culture Centre in Udaipur, Rajasthan is one of seven Cultural Zones established by the Government of India to preserve and promote India's traditional cultural heritage. The centre works to retain and develop regional cultural resources, including traditional and tribal arts. It is provided with administrative infrastructure by the Government of India.

== General ==
West Zone Cultural Centre (WZCC) is one of the seven Zonal Cultural Centres in India. It is set up in 1986–87, under the direct initiative of the Ministry of Human Resource Development, Govt. of India. The office of the West Zone Cultural Centre is located at Bagore-ki-Haveli.

== Other Regional Cultural Centres of India ==
- East Zone Cultural Centre, Kolkata
- North Zone Culture Centre, Patiala, Punjab
- North East Zone Cultural Centre, Chümoukedima, Nagaland
- North Central Zone Cultural Centre, Prayagraj
- South Zone Cultural Centre, Thanjavur
- South-Central Zone Cultural Centre, Nagpur

== See also ==
- Bagore-ki-Haveli
- Shilpgram
