= North Zone Cultural Centre =

Coordinates: 30°20′0″N 76°23′38″E

NZCC
- North Zone Cultural Centre
- Uttara Kṣētra Sāṁskr̥tika Kēṁdra
- Formation: March 23, 1985; 41 years ago
- Founder: Rajiv Gandhi
- Type: Zonal Cultural Centre
- Purpose: Education, preservation and promotion of arts and culture
- Location: Patiala, India
- Website: www.culturenorthindia.com

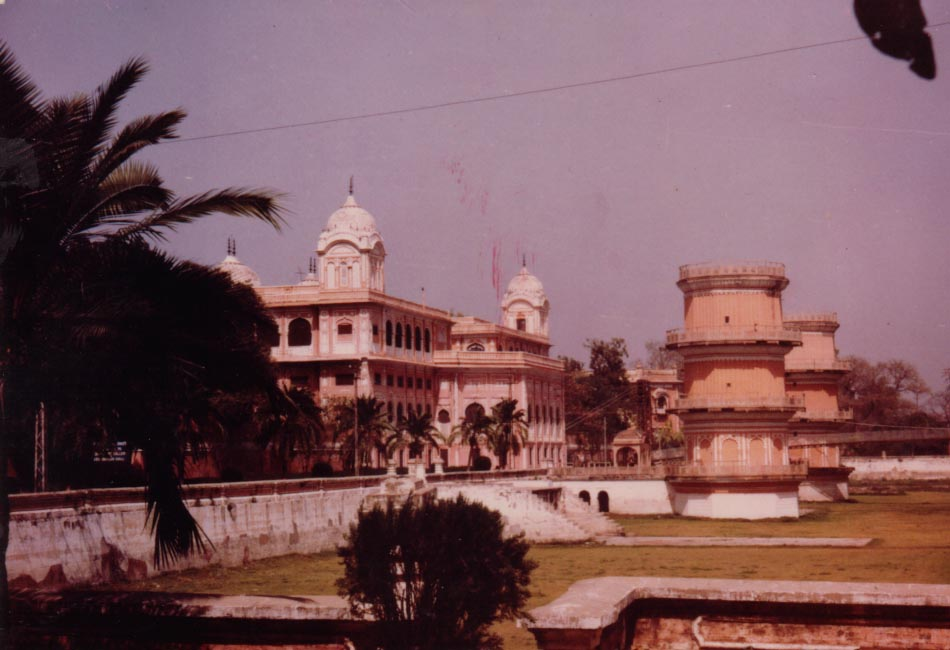
Old Moti Bagh palace in Patiala, seat of NZCC

North Zone Cultural Centre or NZCC (ISO: Uttara Kṣētra Sāṁskr̥tika Kēṁdra) in Patiala in Punjab state was first among several regional cultural centres established by Government of India to preserve and promote arts, crafts, traditions and cultural heritage of the Indian states of Punjab, Himachal Pradesh, Uttarakhand, Haryana, Rajasthan, as well as the union territories of Jammu and Kashmir, Ladakh and Chandigarh.

Establishment of North Zone Culture Centre was announced by then Prime Minister of India, Rajiv Gandhi during his visit to Hussainiwala, Punjab on 23 March 1985.

The North Cultural Zone is one of seven Cultural Zones of India defined and provided with administrative infrastructure by the Government of India.

== Other Regional Cultural Centres of India ==
- East Zone Cultural Centre, Kolkata
- North East Zone Cultural Centre, Chümoukedima, Nagaland
- North Central Zone Cultural Centre, Prayagraj
- West Zone Cultural Centre Udaipur
- South Zone Cultural Centre, Tanjavur
- South-Central Zone Cultural Centre, Nagpur, Maharashtra
