= Bagore Ki Haveli =

Haveli in Udaipur, Rajasthan, India

Coordinates: 24.5796687°N 73.6800357°E

Bagore ki Haveli
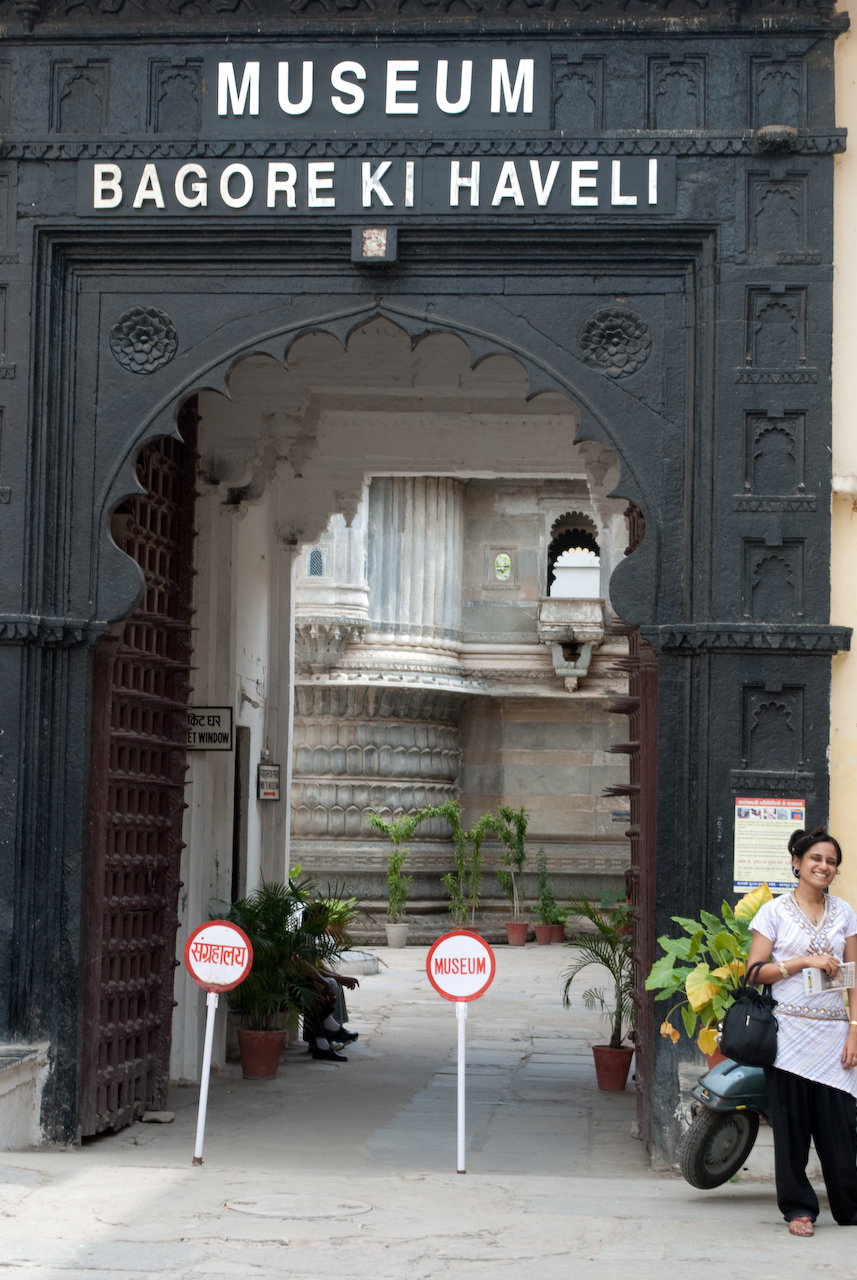
- Museum at Bagore ki Haveli

- Haveli in Udaipur Bagore Ki Haveli (India)

History
- Built: ~ 1751 to 1778 CE
- Built for: Amarchand Badwa
- Original use: haveli

Bagore-ki-Haveli is a haveli in Udaipur in Rajasthan state in India. It is right on the waterfront of Lake Pichola at Gangori Ghat. Amar Chand Badwa, a Prime Minister of Mewar, built it in the eighteenth century.

== Overview ==
The palace has over a hundred rooms, with displays of costumes and modern art. The glass and mirror in the interiors are Haveli work. It also preserves an example of Mewar painting on the walls of the Queen's Chamber. The two peacocks made from small pieces of colored glasses are examples of glasswork.

== History ==
Shri Amarchand Badwa, a Sanadhya Brahmin who was the Prime Minister of Mewar from 1751 to 1778, throughout the reigns of Maharanas Pratap Singh II, Raj Singh II, Ari Singh, and Hamir Singh respectively, built this haveli. Following the death of Amarchand, the edifice came under the domain of the Mewari royal family and Bagore-ki-Haveli was occupied by Nath Singh, a relative of the then maharana. In 1878, the natural father of Sajjan Singh, Maharaj Shakti Singh of Bagore extended the haveli and built the triple-arched gateway, and the property remained in the possession of Mewar State until 1947. After Independence, the Government of Rajasthan used the buildings for housing Government employees, but, as with other nationalised properties, where there was nobody with a vested interest in the standards of maintenance, damage and neglect went unchecked, and for almost forty years, the haveli's condition deteriorated to a deplorable extent. The Government was eventually persuaded to relinquish their hold on the haveli and in 1986; it was handed over to the West Zone Cultural Centre.

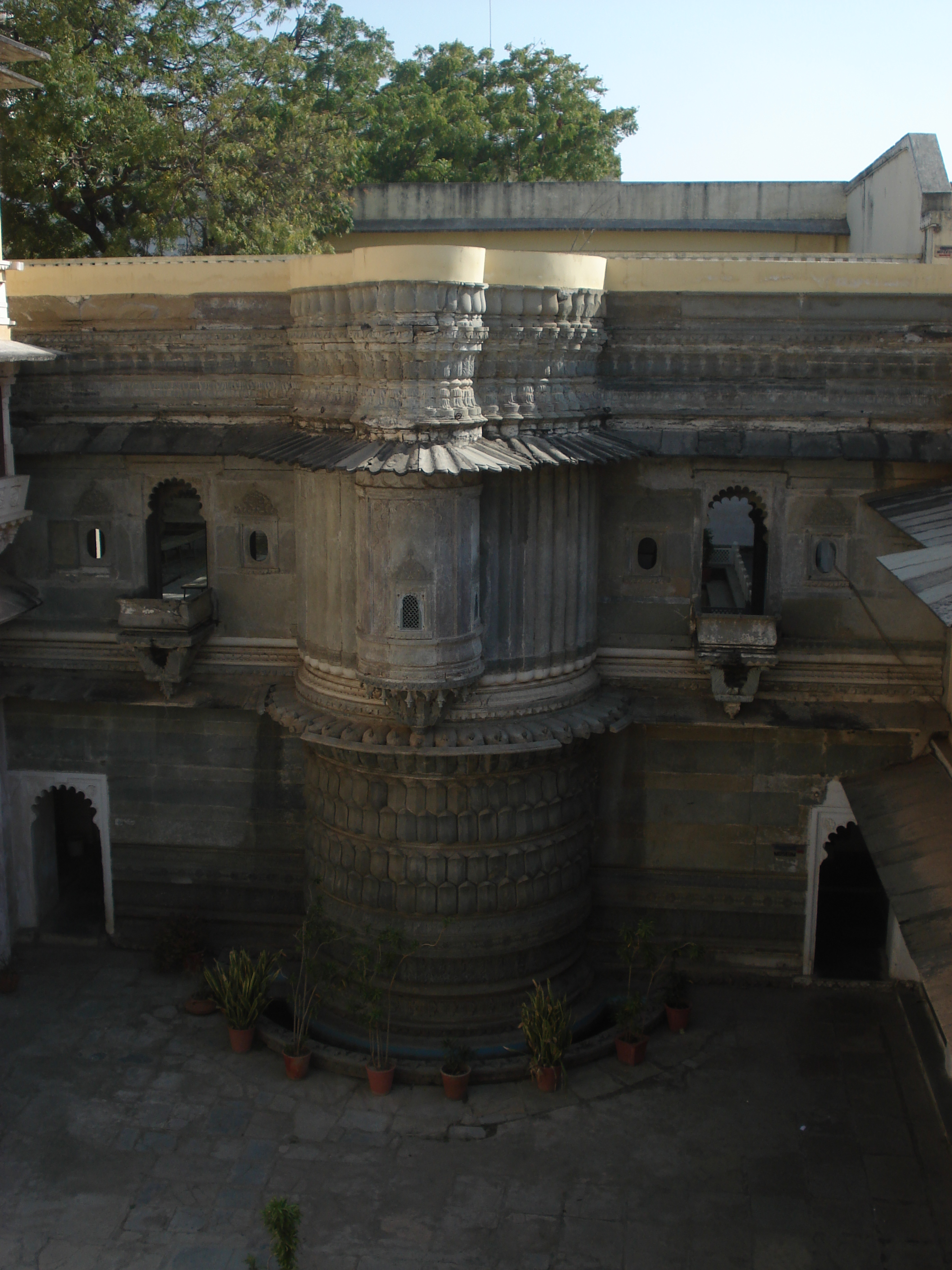
Entrance court at Bagore-ki-Haveli

== Restoration Work ==
The West Zone Cultural Centre planned to renovate the haveli into a museum. Originally, the idea was to represent the culture of Maharashtra, Goa, Gujarat and Rajasthan, the West Zone States, in the proposed museum. However, seeing that the Haveli was an architectural museum by itself, owing to typical and charming architectural style, it was decided that it would be preserved as a museum of Mewar's aristocratic culture.

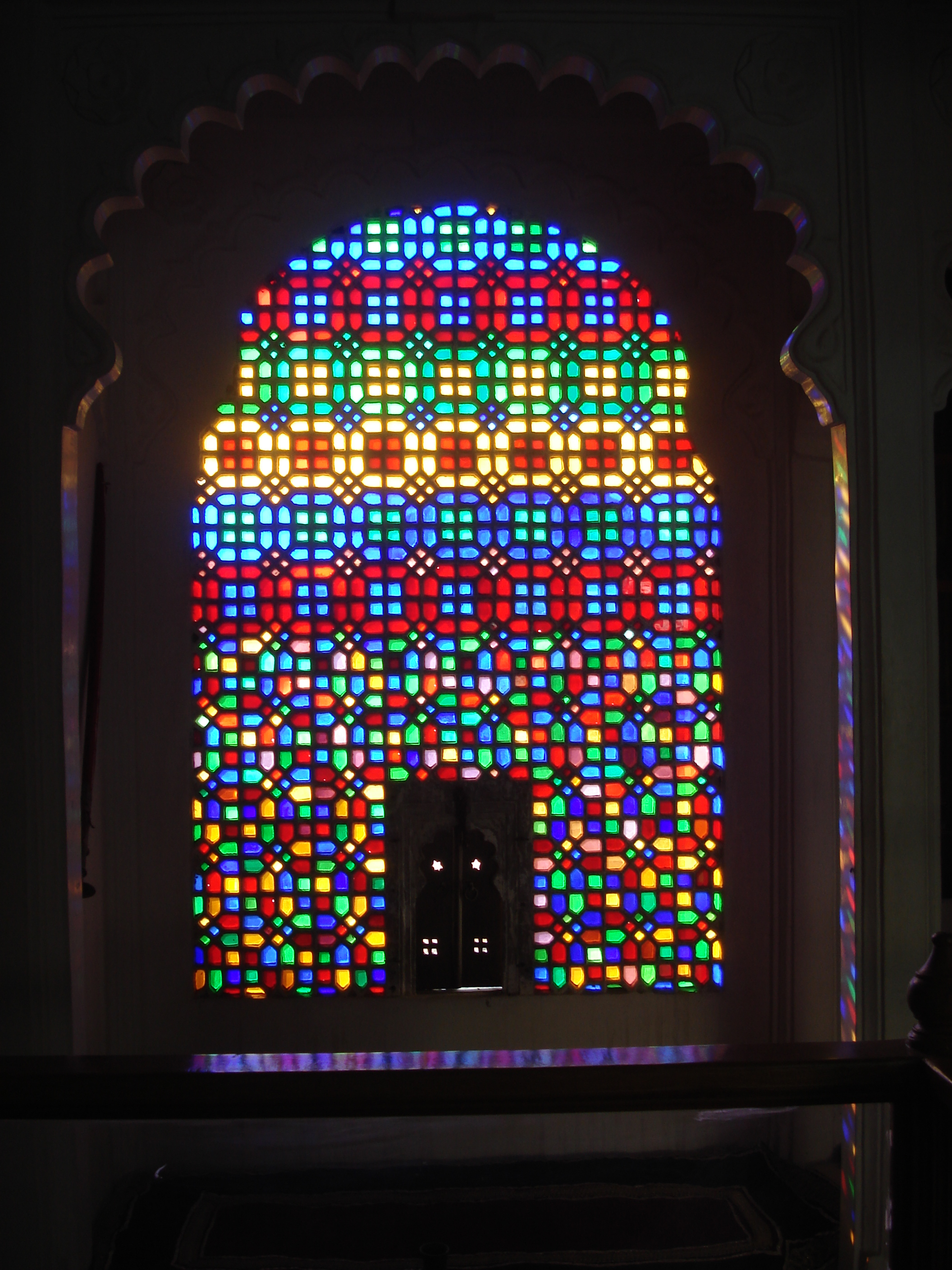
Glass window at Bagore-ki-Haveli

To provide the same royal look, experts and members of the royal family were consulted. The Haveli was restored primarily using local and traditional skills and materials including lakhori bricks and lime mortar. Several murals done in araish in the 18th and 19th century were uncovered, and many doors, windows and perforated screens were repaired or replaced.

== Present Status ==
There are 138 rooms, as well as numerous corridors & balconies, courtyards and terraces. The interiors of the Haveli are embellished with intricate and fine mirror work.

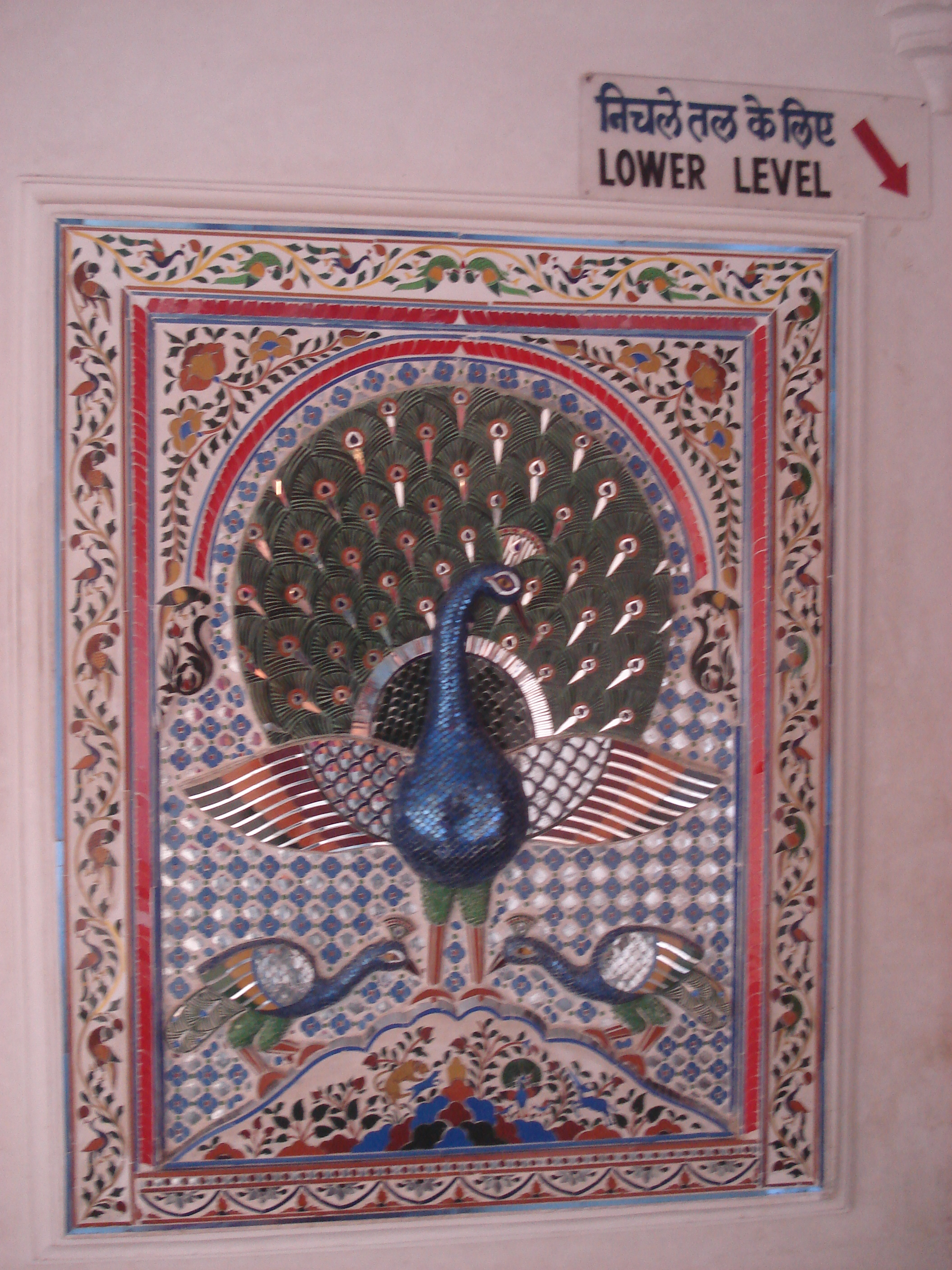

The Chambers of the Royal Ladies still bear fine frescoes of the Mewari style and there are coloured-glass windows in some of the rooms as well as two peacocks made with coloured glass mosaics that display the skills of the craftsman.

Unique symbols of the Rajput clan, such as jewellery boxes, dice-games, hukkas, pan boxes, nut crackers, hand fans, rose water sprinklers, copper vessels and other items are also on display here.
