= North East Zone Cultural Centre =

- Formation: 1986–87
- Type: Zonal Cultural Centre
- Purpose: Education, preservation and promotion of arts and culture
- Location: Chümoukedima, Nagaland, India
- Website: www.nezcc.in

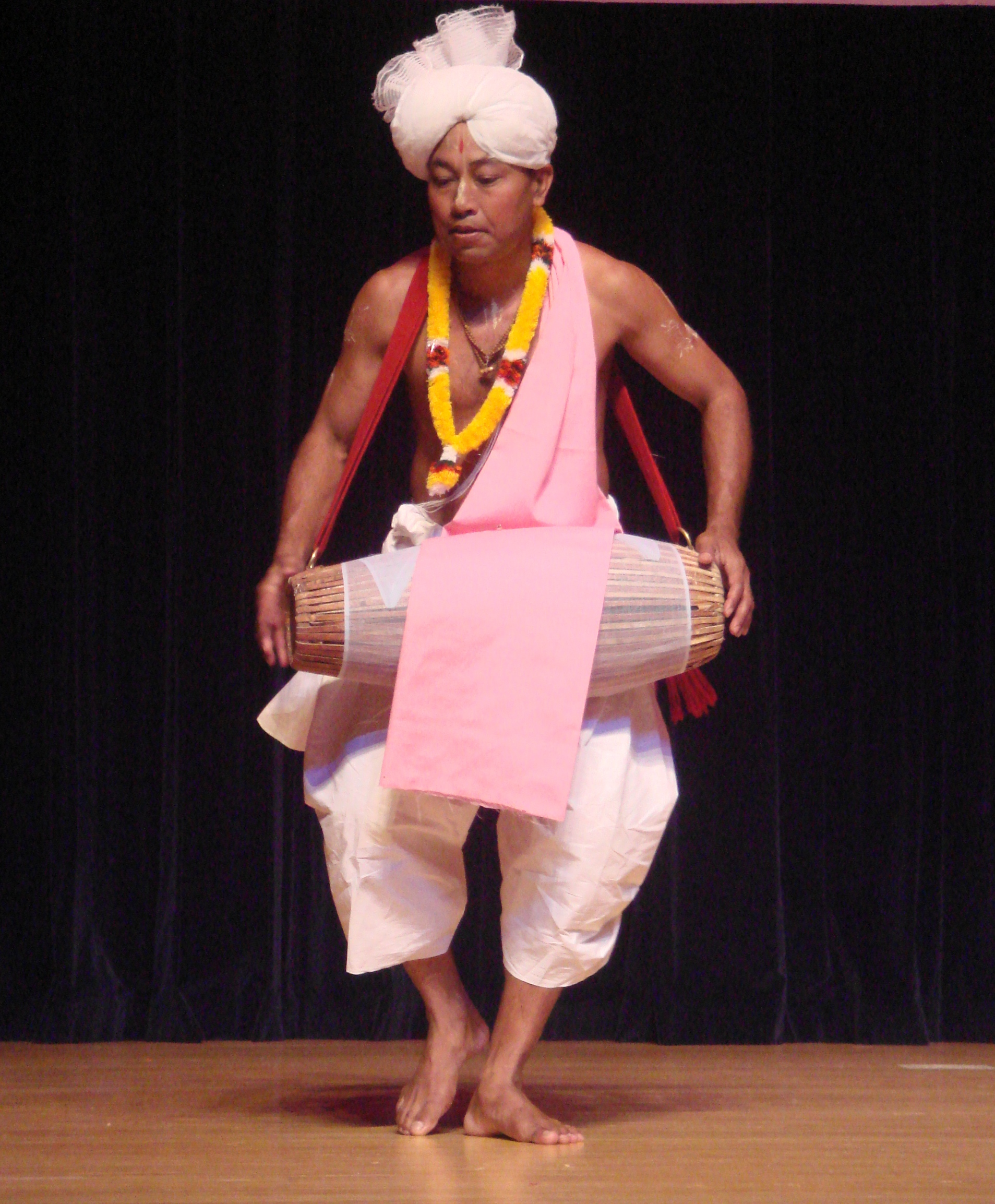
A traditional Pung cholom performer from Manipur.

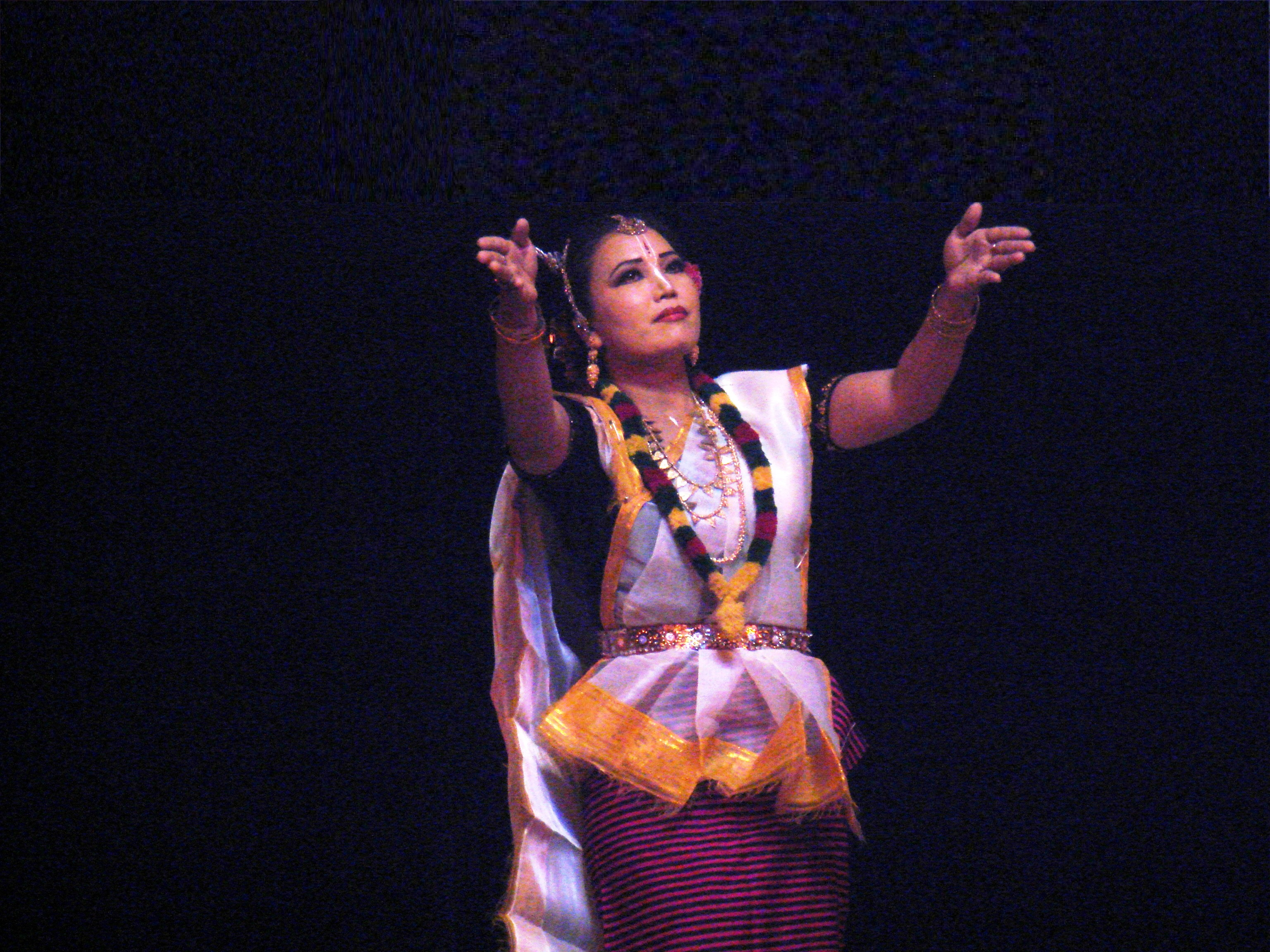
A Manipuri performer strikes an evocative pose.

North East Zone Culture Centre in Chümoukedima in Nagaland state is one of many regional cultural centres established by the Indian Government to preserve and promote traditional cultural heritage of India. The North East Cultural Zone is one of seven Cultural Zones of India defined and provided with administrative infrastructure by the Government of India.

== Other Regional Cultural Centres of India ==
- East Zone Cultural Centre, Kolkata
- North Zone Cultural Centre, Patiala
- West Zone Cultural Centre, Udaipur
- South Zone Cultural Centre, Tanjavur
- North Central Zone Cultural Centre, Prayagraj
