= List of office-holders in the Government of India =

Office holders in India

This is a list of current office holder of various fields in Government of India.

== Current Constitutional office-holders of India ==
Office	Portrait	Name	Since	Ref.
President		Droupadi Murmu	25 July 2022	
Vice President		C. P. Radhakrishnan	12 September 2025	
Prime Minister		Narendra Modi	26 May 2014	
Chief Justice		Surya Kant	24 November 2025	
Speaker of Lok Sabha		Om Birla	19 June 2019	
Chief Election Commissioner		Gyanesh Kumar	19 February 2025	
Comptroller and Auditor General		K Sanjay Murthy	21 November 2024	
Chairperson of Union Public Service Commission		Ajay Kumar	15 May 2025	
Attorney General		R. Venkataramani	1 Oct 2022	

== Cabinet Ministers ==
Office	Portrait	Name	Since
Minister of Home Affairs		Amit Shah	30 May 2019
Minister of Finance		Nirmala Sitharaman	30 May 2019
Minister of Defence		Rajnath Singh	30 May 2019
Minister of External Affairs		S. Jaishankar	30 May 2019
Minister of Railways		Ashwini Vaishnaw	7 July 2021
Bureaucrats with Cabinet Minister rank
National Security Advisor		Ajit Doval, IPS	30 May 2014
Principal Secretary to the Prime Minister		Pramod Kumar Mishra, IAS	11 September 2019
Principal Secretary to the Prime Minister		Shaktikanta Das, IAS	22February 2025

== Important Bureaucratic officeholders ==
Cabinet Secretary	T. V. Somanathan, IAS	30 August 2024
Home Secretary	Govind Mohan, IAS	22 August 2024
Finance Secretary	Vacant, IAS	
Defence Secretary	Rajesh Kumar Singh, IAS	1 November 2024
Foreign Secretary	Vikram Misri, IFS	15 July 2024
Secretary General of the Lok Sabha	Utpal Kumar Singh, IAS	30 November 2020
Secretary General of the Rajya Sabha	Pramod Chandra Mody, IRS (IT)	12 November 2021
Secretary General of the Supreme Court of India	Dr. Ajit Atri , Supreme court telephone directory	3 August 2023
Chairperson of the Railway Board	Satish Kumar, IRSME	1 September 2024
Solicitor General	Tushar Mehta	10 October 2018
Principal Scientific Adviser	Ajay K. Sood	3 April 2022
Chief Economic Adviser	V. Anantha Nageswaran	28 January 2022

== Heads of commissions ==
Office	Portrait	Name	Since
Chairperson, National Human Rights Commission		V. Ramasubramanian	23 December 2024
Chairperson, National Commission for Minorities		Harjit Singh Grewal	22 July 2026
Chairperson, National Commission for Scheduled Castes		Kishor Makwana	9 March 2024
Chairperson, National Commission for Scheduled Tribes		Antar Singh Arya	9 March 2024
Chairperson, National Commission for Backward Classes		Sadhvi Niranjan Jyoti	18 March 2026
Chairperson, National Commission for Women		Vijaya Kishore Rahatkar	22 October 2024
Chairperson, National Commission for Protection of Child Rights		Valeti Premchand	
Chairperson, Central Administrative Tribunal		Ranjit More	30 July 2022
Chairperson, Central Vigilance Commission		A.S.Rajeev	3 August 2026
Chairperson, Central Information Commission		Raj Kumar Goyal	15 December 2025
Chairperson, Atomic Energy Commission		Ajit Kumar Mohanty	1 May 2023
Secretary, Department of Space		V. Narayanan	15 January 2022
Chairperson, University Grants Commission		Deepti Gaur Mukherjee	12 July 2026
Chairperson, Competition Commission of India		Ravneet Kaur	23 May 2023
Chairperson, Central Water Commission		Anupam Prasad	1 May 2025
Chairperson, National Forest Commission		B. N. Kirpal	
Chairperson, National Council for Transgender Persons		Laxmi Narayan Tripathi	27 August 2020

== Heads of financial bodies ==
Office	Name	Since
Chairperson, 16th Finance Commission	Arvind Panagariya	16 January 2024
Governor of Reserve Bank of India	Sanjay Malhotra	11 December 2024
Chairperson, Securities and Exchange Board of India	Tuhin Kanta Pandey	1 March 2025
Chairperson, Insurance Regulatory and Development Authority	Ajay Seth	1 September 2025
Chairperson, 8th Pay Commission	Ranjana Desai	29 October 2025
Chairperson, Small Industries Development Bank	Manoj Mittal	19 April 2024
Chairperson and managing director, Export-Import Bank	Harsha Bhupendra Bangari	7 September 2021
Chief Executive Officer and Managing Director, National Housing Bank	Sanjay Shukla	10 April 2024
Chairperson, National Bank for Agriculture and Rural Development	Shaji K. V.	7 December 2022
Chief Executive Officer and Managing Director, Industrial Finance Corporation	Rahul Bhave	1 December 2024
Chairperson, National Stock Exchange	Girish Chandra Chaturvedi	
Chairperson, Bombay Stock Exchange	Subhasis Chaudhuri	22 November 2024
Chairperson, State Bank of India	Challa Sreenivasulu Setty	28 August 2024
Chairperson, Industrial Development Bank	M. R. Kumar	
Chairperson, Life Insurance Corporation	R Doraiswamy	15 June 2025
Chairperson of the Central Board of Direct Taxes	Ravi Agarwal, (IRS(IT))	1 July 2024
Chairperson of the Central Board of Indirect Taxes and Customs	Vivek Chaturvedi, (IRS (CIT))	1 December 2025
President, Federation of Indian Chambers of Commerce and Industry	Anant Goenka	1 November 2025
Chairperson, Pension Fund Regulatory and Development Authority	Sivasubramanian Ramann	1 June 2025
President, Confederation of Indian Industry	Rajiv Memani	3 June 2025
President, Associated Chambers of Commerce and Industry	Sanjay Nayar	
Chairperson, National Statistical Commission	Saibal Chattopadhyay	18 June 2026
Director, Enforcement Directorate	Rahul Navin	16 September 2023

== Defence and Security ==
Occupation	Name	From year
Chief of Defence Staff	General N. S. Raja Subramani	1 June 2026
Chief of the Army Staff	General Dhiraj Seth	1 July 2026
Chief of the Naval Staff	Admiral Krishna Swaminathan	1 June 2026
Chief of the Air Staff	Air Chief Marshal Ashutosh Dixit	1 November 2026
Chief of Integrated Defence Staff	Air Marshal Tejinder Singh	1 July 2026
Director General, Defence Intelligence Agency	Lieutenant General V Hariharan	1 October 2026
Director of the Intelligence Bureau	Mahesh Dixit , IPS	1 July 2026
Secretary, Research and Analysis Wing	Parag Jain, IPS	1 July 2025
Secretary, Special Protection Group	Rajiv Singh, IPS	5 June 2025
Director, Central Bureau of Investigation	Praveen Sood, IPS	25 May 2023
Director General, Border Security Force	Praveen Kumar, IPS	1 December 2025
Director General, Central Reserve Police Force	Gyanendra Pratap Singh, IPS	20 January 2025
Director General, Central Industrial Security Force	Praveer Ranjan, IPS	1 October 2025
Director General, Indo-Tibetan Border Police	Shatrujeet Singh Kapoor, IPS	15 January 2026
Director General, Sashastra Seema Bal	Sanjay Singhal, IPS	1 September 2025
Director General, National Security Guard	B. Srinivasan, IPS	28 August 2024
Director General, National Investigation Agency	Rakesh Aggarwal, IPS	15 January 2026
Director General, National Disaster Response Force	Piyush Anand, IPS	1 April 2024
