= Indian Revenue Service =

Indian taxation agency

Indian Revenue Service Bhāratīya Rājasva Sevā
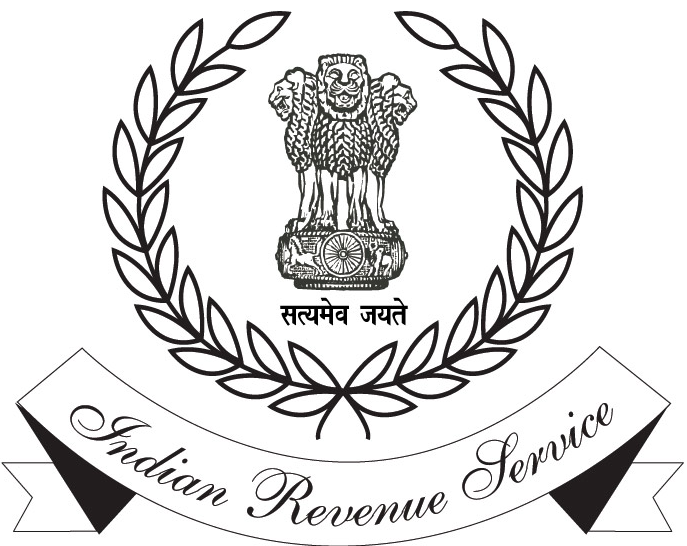
- IRS (Income Tax) IRS (Customs and Indirect Taxes)

Service overview
- Founded: 1919; 107 years ago (as Imperial Customs Service); 1944; 82 years ago (as Income Tax Service); 1953; 73 years ago (as Indian Revenue Service)
- Headquarters: North Block, New Delhi
- Country: India
- Staff colleges: 1. National Academy of Direct Taxes, Nagpur, Maharashtra; 2. National Academy of Customs Indirect Taxes and Narcotics, NH-44, Palasamudram, Gorantla Mandal, Hindupur Taluk, Sri Sathya Sai district, Andhra Pradesh
- Cadre controlling authority: Department of Revenue, Ministry of Finance
- Minister responsible: Nirmala Sitharaman, Minister of Finance and Minister of Corporate Affairs
- Legal personaliity: Governmental civil service
- Cadre strength: 9,775 members (2018); 4,192 (Income Tax) and 5,583 (Customs and Indirect Taxes)
- Selection: Civil Services Examination
- Associations: 1. Indian Revenue Service Association; 2. IRS (Customs & Indirect Taxes) Association

Service chiefs
- Chairperson, CBDT: Ravi Agarwal, IRS-IT:1988
- Chairperson, CBIC: Sanjay Agarwal, IRS–C&IT:1988

Head of the civil services
- Cabinet Secretary: T. V. Somanathan, IAS

The Indian Revenue Service (IAST: Bhāratīya Rājasva Sevā), often abbreviated as IRS, is a civil service that is primarily responsible for collecting and administering direct and indirect taxes. As a central civil service under Group A of the executive branch of the Government of India, it functions under the Department of Revenue of the Ministry of Finance and is under the administrative direction of the Revenue Secretary and the ministerial command of the Minister of Finance.

The IRS comprises two branches, Indian Revenue Service (Income Tax) and Indian Revenue Service (Custom & Indirect Taxes), controlled by two separate statutory bodies, the Central Board of Direct Taxes (CBDT) and the Central Board of Indirect Taxes and Customs (CBIC). The duties of the IRS (IT) include among others, formulation of domestic direct tax policy (through the Tax Policy and Legislation Section), formulation of international tax policy (through the Foreign Tax and Tax Research Division), handling policy matters in respect of investigation of tax evasion (through the Investigation Section), updating, resolving and maintaining the relevant laws (through the ITA Division), administering the direct tax policy (through its field offices across the country), and administering all the associated administrative functions pertaining to direct taxes. The duties of the IRS (C&IT) include formulation and enforcement of policy concerning the Goods and Services Tax, prevention of smuggling, and administration of matters related to customs and narcotics.

In the 2017–2018 financial year (i.e. 1 April 2017 to 31 March 2018), the IRS (IT) received 58,713,458 returns and collected direct taxes amounting to ₹11.37 trillion, spending ₹60,000 (equivalent to ₹99,000 or US$1,100 in 2026) for every ₹1,000 (equivalent to ₹1,600 or US$18 in 2026) it collected. The relative contribution of direct tax to the overall tax collection of the Central Government has risen from about 36% to 56% over the period of 2000–01 to 2013–14. The contribution of direct tax-to-GDP has doubled (from about 3% to 6%) during the same period.

== History ==
=== Indian Revenue Service (Income Tax) ===
Direct tax in the form of an income tax was introduced by Sir James Wilson in India in 1860 to overcome the difficulties created by the Indian Rebellion of 1857. The organisational history of the Income-tax Department, however, starts in the year 1922, when the Income-tax Act, 1922 gave, for the first time, a specific nomenclature to various Income-tax authorities. In 1924, the Central Board of Revenue Act constituted a Central Board of Revenue – the statutory body with functional responsibilities for administering the Income Tax Act.

Commissioners of income tax were appointed for each province, and assistant commissioners and tax officers were placed under their control. Officers from the Imperial Civil Services (ICS) occupied top posts and the lower echelons were filled through promotions from the ranks. The Income Tax Service was established in 1944 and was subsequently re-constituted as the Indian Revenue Service (Income Tax) in 1953.

In 1963, given the increasingly complex roles and responsibilities of administering direct tax in India, the Central Board of Direct Taxes was constituted as a statutory body under the Central Board of Revenue Act, 1963.

=== Indian Revenue Service (Customs and Central Excise) ===
With the passing of the Government of India Act, 1919 the civil services—under the oversight of the Secretary of State for India—were split into two arms, the All India Services, and the Central Services. Apart from the Central Secretariat, the more important of these latter were the Railway Services, the Indian Posts and Telegraph Service, and the Imperial Customs Service. After Independence, the Imperial Customs Service was reconstituted as the Indian Revenue Service (Customs and Central Excise) in 1953.

The nature of the service underwent a transformational change with the enactment of the One Hundred and First Amendment of the Constitution of India, which overhauled the administration of indirect taxation in India with the introduction of the Goods and Services Tax (GST). With the subsumption of several indirect taxes and levies, including central excise duty and Service Tax, under the GST, the nomenclature was updated to reflect the changed structure of taxation from IRS (Customs and Central Excise) to IRS (Customs and Indirect Taxes).

== Recruitment ==
There are two streams of recruitment to the Indian Revenue Service. IRS officers may enter the IRS by passing the Civil Services Examination (CSE). The CSE is a three-stage competitive selection process consisting of a preliminary examination, the main examination, and an interview. It is administered by the Union Public Service Commission (UPSC). IRS officers recruited in this way are called direct recruits.

Some IRS officers are also recruited from Central Services (Group B). These include Income Tax Service (Group B), Customs Appraisers Service (Group B), Customs Preventive Service (Group B), and Central Excise Service (Group B). Group 'B' officers are gradually promoted over several years of service. The current ratio of two streams at the entry level is kept at 1:1. All IRS officers, regardless of their mode of entry, are appointed by the President of India.

== Training ==
After selection, successful candidates undergo a 3-month Foundation Course at the Lal Bahadur Shastri National Academy of Administration (LBSNAA) in Mussoorie, Uttarakhand,

Thereafter, IRS(IT) Officer Trainees (OTs) undergo a 16-month specialised training at the National Academy of Direct Taxes (NADT), in Nagpur, Maharashtra, while IRS(C&IT) OTs undergo specialised training at the National Academy of Customs, Indirect Taxes and Narcotics (NACIN), in Palasamudram, Gorantla mandal, Hindupur taluk, Sri Sathya Sai district, Andhra Pradesh.

=== National Academy of Direct Taxes ===
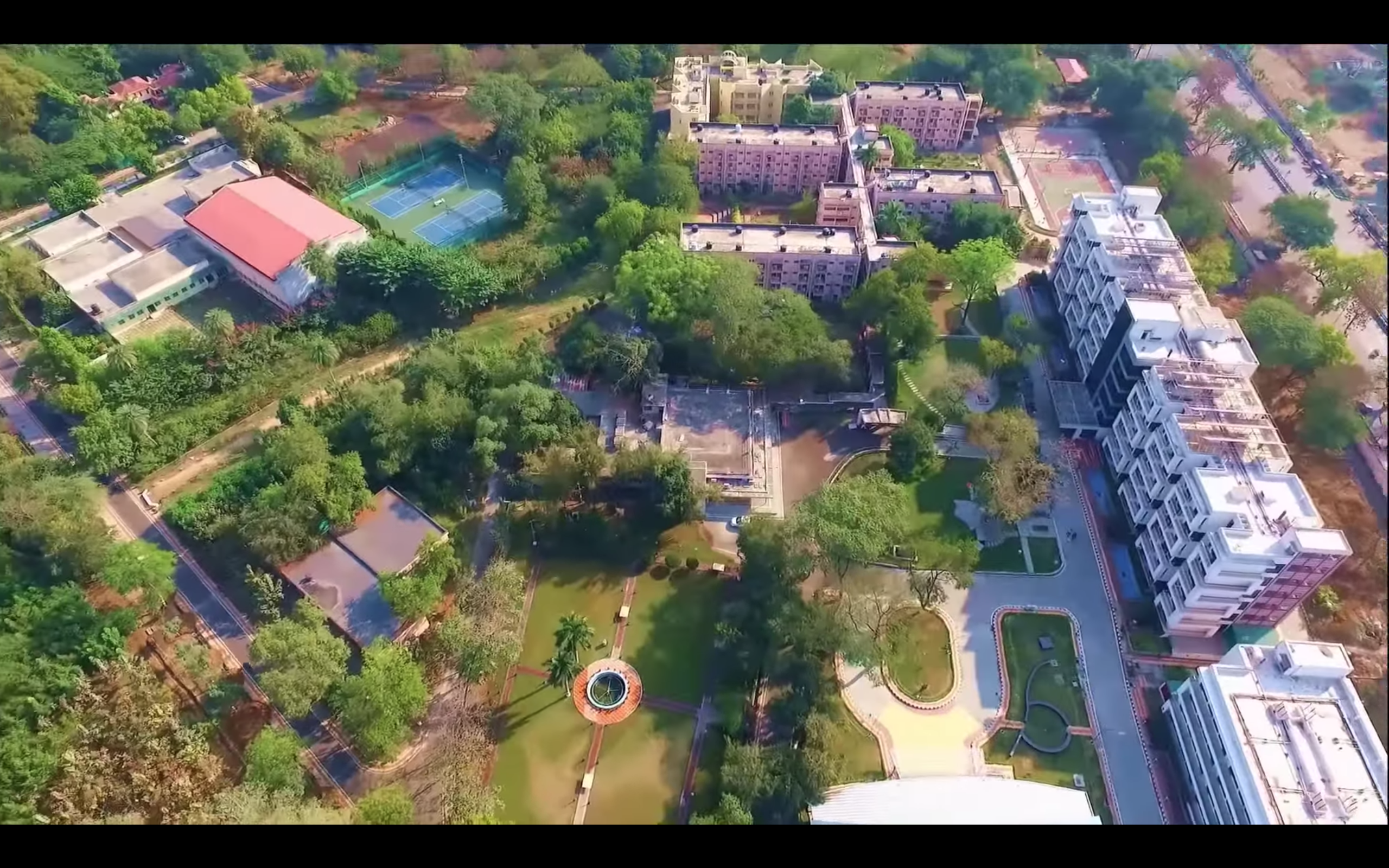
National Academy of Direct Taxes in Nagpur, Maharashtra is the staff training college of the IRS(IT).

Sixteen months of Induction Training is conducted for the directly recruited officers of IRS(IT) at NADT each year. The training is designed into two modules to enable the Officer Trainees to acquire the knowledge and skills they need to function effectively and efficiently as tax administrators. In particular, training prepares OTs to deliver quality taxpayer services, detect and penalise non-compliance, and understand the macroeconomic, taxation, and fiscal policy of the Government of India to maximise revenue.

==== First Module ====
The First Module emphasises on giving intense theoretical inputs in the subjects such as Theoretical Concepts and Practical Application of Direct Tax Laws, Advanced Accounting and Finance, and Business Laws-I. It also includes a week-long Parliamentary Attachment, and a two-week Field Attachment. OTs also undergo short-duration training at NACIN, Faridabad, LBSNAA, Mussoorie, and the Sardar Vallabhbhai Patel National Police Academy (SVPNPA), Hyderabad. The first Departmental Examinations are conducted at the end of the first module.

==== Second Module ====
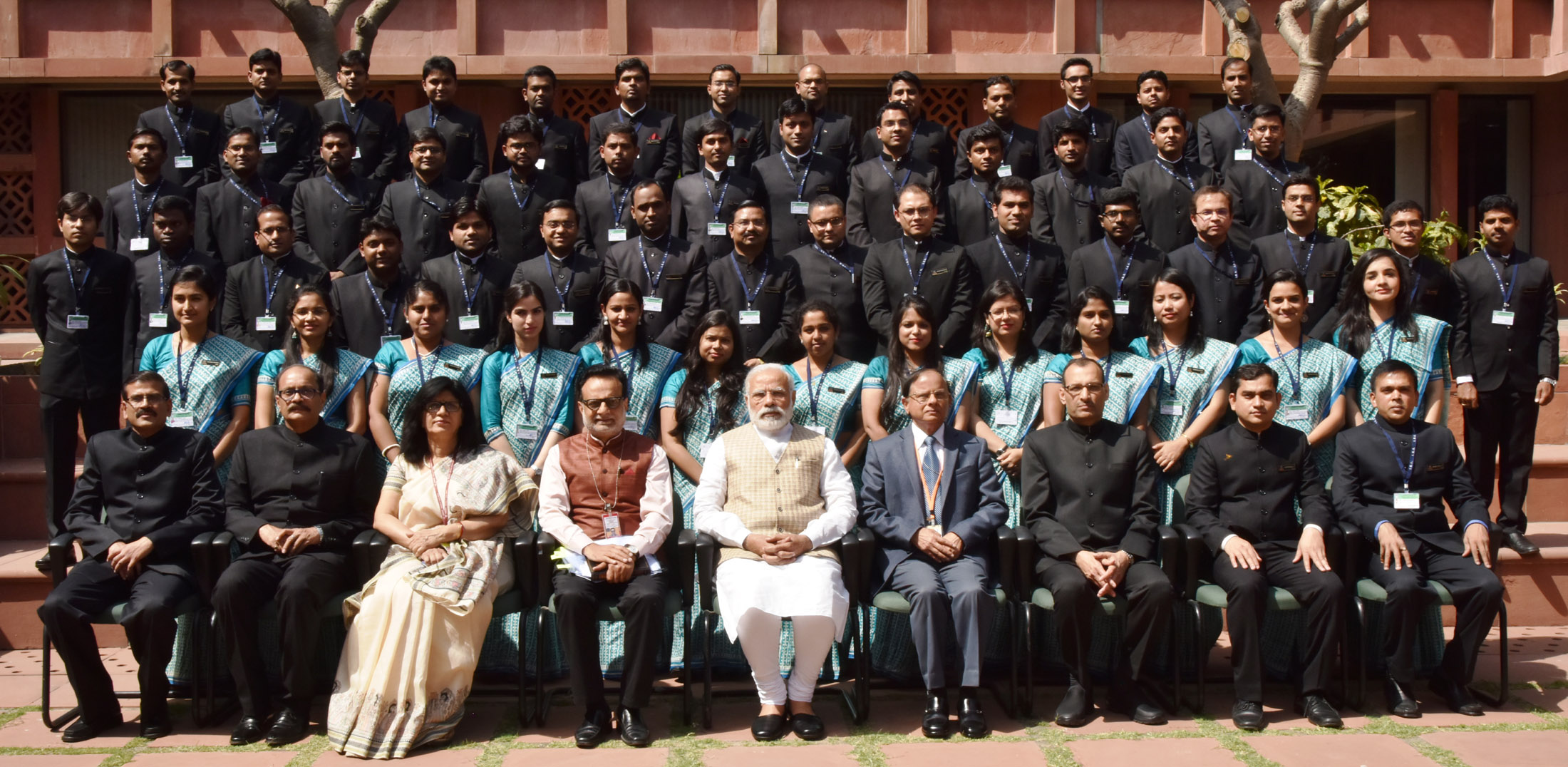
The Prime Minister, Shri Narendra Modi with the Officer Trainees of the Indian Revenue Service (IT) Probationers of 70th Batch, in New Delhi

The second module includes On-The-Job Training for around eight weeks, followed by Bharat Darshan, and a Financial Attachment for 2 weeks. Further, The OTs are also exposed to the international tax practices through a one or two weeks International Attachment in France, Netherlands, Australia, Malaysia, South Africa, the US, or Singapore. OTs are also trained to apply theoretical concepts and acquire practical skills through the subjects of Procedure/Techniques of Investigation and Drafting of Orders and Reports, Information Technology and Operations, Management and Administration in the Income Tax Department, International Taxation and Transfer Pricing, Law of Governance and Ethics, and Business Laws-II. A number of guest lectures are organised to familiarise the trainees with the best practices in tax administration.

Officer Trainees are also expected to complete a project on Direct Tax Provisions for the award of a master's degree in Business Law and Taxation from NALSAR University of Law, Hyderabad at the time of Valediction from NADT.

=== National Academy of Customs, Indirect Taxes, and Narcotics ===
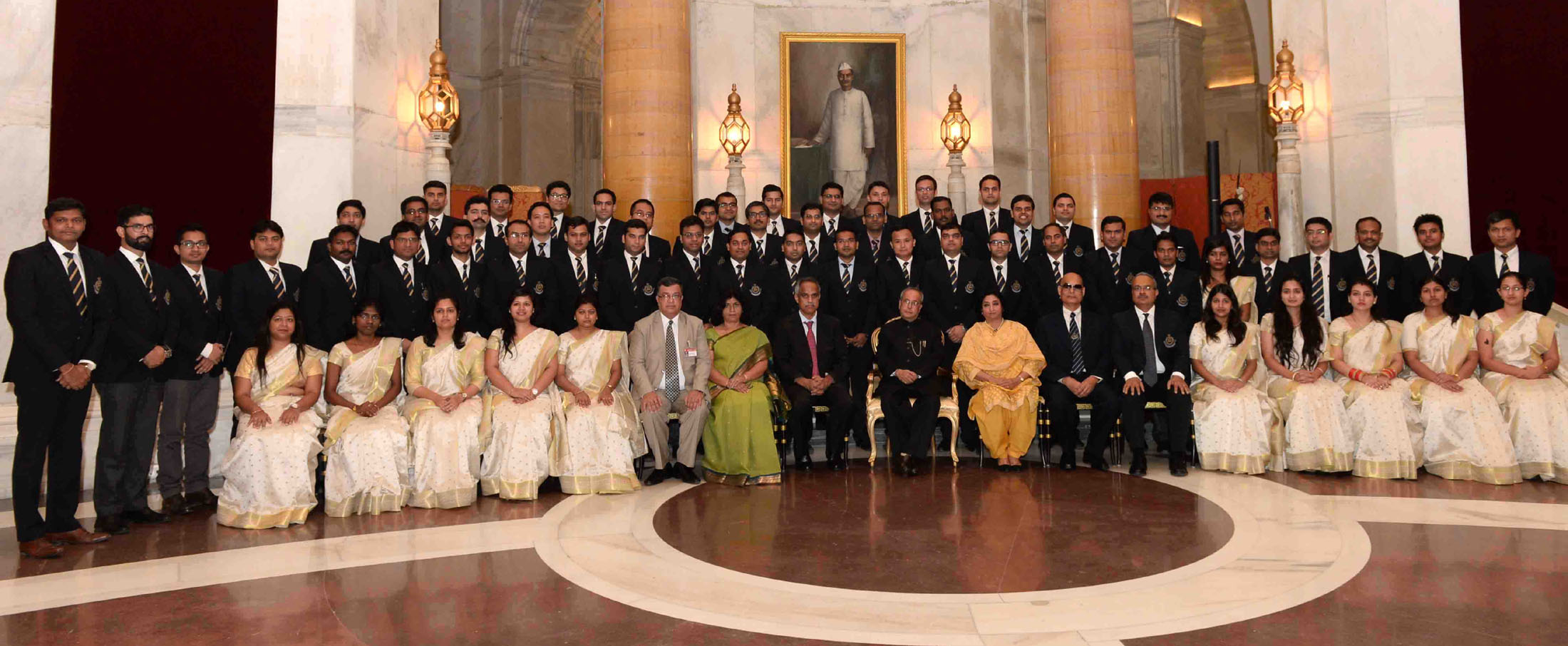
Pranab Mukherjee with the Probationers of 66th (2014 Batch) of the Indian Revenue Service (Customs & Central Excise) from National Academy of Customs, Excise & Narcotics, Faridabad, at Rashtrapati Bhavan, in New Delhi

This involves dynamic training in specialised matters of conventional tax administration – be it direct or indirect-along with unarmed combat, weapons, and explosives. Additionally, IRS officers undergo extensive training with the Army and the National Police Academy, and many other prestigious institutes of the country so that they are better prepared to excel in their multifaceted role. NADT and NACIN both have signed a memorandum of understanding with the National Law School of India University in Bengaluru to award postgraduate diplomas in business laws to the officer trainees. Recently, Finance Ministry has approved the exchange of officer trainees to various countries across the world such as the Netherlands, Belgium, Switzerland, France, Australia, Malaysia, United States of America, Brazil, South Africa and OECD Nations, for increasing exposure to the future administrators.

There are various mid-career training programmes (MCTP) for IRS officers to keep them abreast of the latest developments in the areas of governance, particularly taxation, finance and management. These include advanced mid-career training (AMCTP), which is conducted in 3 phases. Phase I is for joint and additional commissioners, Phase II is for commissioners and principal commissioners, and Phase III is for chief commissioners and principal chief commissioners. The AMCTP generally consists of a 3-week domestic module held at premier management institutes in the country followed by a 2-week international component at internationally acclaimed universities, depending on their areas of expertise.

== Designations ==
The designations and time-scales within the Indian Revenue Service are as follows after cadre restructure:

=== IRS (Income Tax) ===
Ranks, designations, and positions held by Indian Revenue Service (Income Tax) officers in their career
Grade / Scale (Level on Pay Matrix)	Posting in Income Tax Department	Position in Government of India	Position in Order of precedence in India	Pay Scale (Note: Monthly.) (Basic Pay)
Administrative Head (Pay Level 17)	Chairperson of CBDT	Secretary	23 (Note: CBDT chairman is the senior-most IRS(IT) officer and the administrative head of the Indian Revenue Service (Income Tax), and is equivalent to Secretary to the Government of India.)	₹225,000 (US$2,400)
Apex Scale (Pay Level 17)	Member of CBDT Director of the Enforcement Directorate Principal Chief Commissioner of Income Tax (PCCIT)	Secretary Special Secretary	23	₹225,000 (US$2,400)
Higher Administrative Grade + (Pay Level 16)	Chief Commissioner of Income Tax (CCIT) Director General of Income Tax (DGIT)	Additional Secretary	25	₹205,400 (US$2,200)—₹224,400 (US$2,400)
Higher Administrative Grade (Pay Level 15)	Principal Commissioner / Director of Income Tax (PCIT / PDIT)	Additional Secretary	25	₹182,200 (US$1,900)—₹224,100 (US$2,400)
Senior Administrative Grade (Pay Level 14)	Commissioner of Income Tax (CIT) Additional Director General (ADG); Director of Income Tax (DIT)	Joint Secretary	26	₹144,200 (US$1,500)—₹218,200 (US$2,300)
Selection Grade (Pay Level 13)	Additional Commissioner of Income Tax	Director		₹123,100 (US$1,300)—₹215,900 (US$2,300)
Junior Administrative Grade (Pay Level 12)	Joint Commissioner / Director of Income Tax (JCIT / JDIT)	Deputy Secretary		₹78,800 (US$840)—₹209,200 (US$2,200)
Senior Time Scale (Pay Level 11)	Deputy Commissioner / Director of Income Tax (DCIT / DDIT)	Under Secretary		₹67,700 (US$720)—₹208,700 (US$2,200)
Junior Time Scale (Pay Level 10)	Assistant Commissioner / Director of Income Tax (ACIT / ADIT) Entry-level (Probationer)	Assistant Secretary		₹56,100 (US$600)—₹177,500 (US$1,900)

=== IRS (Central GST and Customs) ===
Ranks, designations, and positions held by Indian Revenue Service (Customs & Indirect Taxes) officers in their career
Grade / Scale (Level on Pay Matrix)	Posting in Central GST / Customs (CBIC)	Position in Government of India	Position in Order of precedence in India	Pay Scale (Basic Pay)
Administrative Head (Pay Level 17)	Chairperson of the CBIC	Secretary	23 (Note: CBIC chairman is the senior-most IRS(C&CE) officer and the administrative head of the Indian Revenue Service (Customs and Indirect Taxes), and is equivalent to Secretary to the Government of India.)	₹225,000 (US$2,400)
Apex Scale (Pay Level 17)	Member of the CBIC Director of the Directorate of Revenue Intelligence Principal Chief Commissioner of Central GST / Customs (PCCIT)	Secretary Special Secretary	23	₹225,000 (US$2,400)
Higher Administrative Grade + (Pay Level 16)	Chief Commissioner of Central GST / Customs (CCIT)	Additional Secretary	25	₹205,400 (US$2,200)—₹224,400 (US$2,400)
Higher Administrative Grade (Pay Level 15)	Principal Commissioner of Central GST / Customs	Additional Secretary	25	₹182,200 (US$1,900)—₹224,100 (US$2,400)
Senior Administrative Grade (Pay Level 14)	Commissioner of Central GST / Customs Additional Director General	Joint Secretary	26	₹144,200 (US$1,500)—₹218,200 (US$2,300)
Selection Grade (Pay Level 13)	Additional Commissioner of Central GST / Customs	Director		₹123,100 (US$1,300)—₹215,900 (US$2,300)
Junior Administrative Grade (Pay Level 12)	Joint Commissioner of Central GST / Customs	Deputy Secretary		₹78,800 (US$840)—₹209,200 (US$2,200)
Senior Time Scale (Pay Level 11)	Deputy Commissioner of Central GST / Customs	Under Secretary		₹67,700 (US$720)—₹208,700 (US$2,200)
Junior Time Scale (Pay Level 10)	Assistant Commissioner of Central GST / Customs Entry-level (Probationer)	Assistant Secretary		₹56,100 (US$600)—₹177,500 (US$1,900)

== Major concerns and reforms ==
=== Corruption ===
In 2015, it was reported that as many as 108 IRS officers were under probe by the CBI for their alleged involvement in corruption. From May 2009 to May 2010, the CBI had sought sanction for prosecution of 102 IRS officials posted in different parts of the country in connection with corruption cases.

In 2016, the Ministry of Finance, dismissed 72 and prematurely retired another 33 Indian Revenue Service officers for non-performance and on disciplinary grounds. In 2019, Government of India dismissed 12 (IRS IT) and 15 (IRS Customs and Central Excise) officers for corruption and bribery charges.

The IRS officials top the Central Bureau of Investigation's list of most corrupt bureaucrats. In one case, a 1992 batch IRS officer was arrested for accepting a bribe of ₹2 crore in Mumbai. Recently, in another case, some IRS officials were found to help certain companies evade payment of Service tax and related penalties of the order of ₹1 crore. Also CBI raided premises of an income tax officer for demanding Bribe to the tune of ₹60 crore for covering up Stock Guru Scam.

=== Murder of many officers ===
Even though IRS officers have to deal with sensitive postings in their career they are not provided adequate security. Many IRS officers in the departments of customs and income tax have been assassinated in the course of their investigations.

Some notable IRS officers who were killed in action –

- Late Shri Lakshman Das Arora (IRS Batch 1977, Customs & Central Excise)
- Late Shri Sambhu Nath Dasgupta (IRS Batch 1962, Customs & Central Excise)

=== Recent initiatives ===
Many new initiatives were taken by the Indian Revenue Service members to curb corruption in their respective departments and make the system more efficient and responsive to the needs of the taxpayers. Use of Technology widely reduced the scope for the abuse of power. Refund Banker scheme introduced in 2007 eliminated the scope for corruption in the Refunds of Excessive Tax collected by the department. Introduction of E-filing of Taxes and effective implementation of Permanent Account Number (PAN) are some revolutionary steps that reduced the scope for corruption at all levels while improving the efficiency of the whole system. Use of Centralised Processing Center setup in 2010 at Bangalore of the Income Tax Department reduced unnecessary delays in processing returns. These computerisation initiatives have freed up the human resources in the department which are largely responsible for higher revenue collections.

Income Tax Ombudsmen was created in 2006 and is functional in 12 cities to look into tax-related grievances of the public. Department is also gearing to improve its tax payer's services with Sevottam Scheme. Under this scheme, various initiatives such as Citizen Charter, Ayakar Seva Kendra (ASK), which is a single Window mechanism for implementing Sevottam through the delivery of these services within the timelines promised in the Citizen's Charter, were launched. Aaykar Sampark Kendra consists of one National Call Centre and 4 regional Call Centres to aid the taxpayer were inaugurated by the Finance Minister.

IRS officers handling sensitive postings are issued a Glock Model 22 pistol or a Glock 23 in .40 S&W calibre.

An IRS officer could rise up to the Apex Scale (₹250,000 fixed plus allowances) at the post of Pr.CCIT in the ITD. At the apex level, he can also get selected as a Member or Chairperson of the CBDT. The intermediate grades in this career progression are deputy commissioner, joint commissioner, additional commissioner, commissioner, principal commissioner and chief commissioner of income tax. An IRS officer is also eligible to be selected as a member of the Income Tax Appellate Tribunal, Authority for Advance Ruling, Income Tax Settlement Commission and Income Tax Ombudsman as per the prescribed eligibility criteria. Cadre Review has been cleared in the Income Tax Department creating 20,751 additional posts to help generate additional revenue of ₹250 billion (equivalent to ₹460 billion or US$5.0 billion in 2026) crore annually.

=== Career progression ===
The slow pace of promotion and recruitment rules creates stagnation and slow career progression in Indian Revenue Service compared to their peers in Indian Administrative Service and Indian Audit and Accounts Service. The global exposure that IRS officer gets through foreign trainings, postings and deputations are not in tandem with the cadre strength. There is also an anomaly in the reporting structure by which Chairmen of both CBDT and CBIC, apex bodies of both streams of IRS reports to Revenue Secretary, who is generally an Indian Administrative Service officer who can be junior than them by seniority and batch.

== Indian Revenue Service officers ==
- Pandula Ravindra Babu, former MP
- Sushil Chandra, former Chief Election Commissioner of India
- K. V. Chowdary, former Central Vigilance Commissioner of India
- Loretta D'Souza, former Field hockey goalkeeper
- Vishwa Bandhu Gupta
- Arvind Kejriwal, former Chief Minister of Delhi
- S. S. Khan
- T. S. Krishnamurthy, former Chief Election Commissioner of India
- Govind Mishra, former CBDT Chairperson
- Sanjay Kumar Mishra, currently a member of the Economic Advisory Council to the Prime Minister
- Pramod Chandra Mody, current Secretary General of the Rajya Sabha
- Krishan Mohan
- Rahul Navin, current Director of the Enforcement Directorate
- Udit Raj
- K. V. L. Narayan Rao
- Paramita Satpathy, winner of the Sahitya Akademi Award
- Poonam Kishore Saxena, former CBDT Chairperson
- Daya Shankar
- Shraddha Joshi Sharma
- Anoop Swarup
- Parveen Talha, former member of the UPSC
- K. G. Arunraj, Cabinet minister in the tamilnadu, member of legislative assembly, 2026, TVK party, Tamilnadu

== See also ==
- Civil Services of India
- All India Services
- Corruption in India
