= Rahul Navin =

Indian Director of Enforcement Directorate

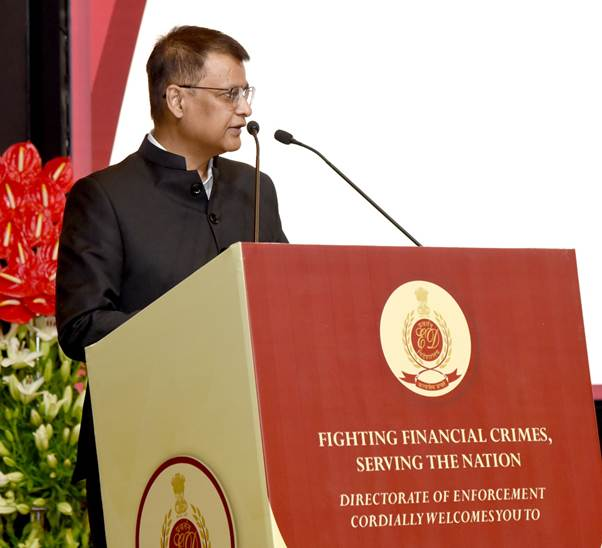
- Navin in 2025

Director of Enforcement Directorate
- Incumbent
- Assumed office 15 August 2024
- Appointed by: Appointments Committee of the Cabinet
- Preceded by: Sanjay Kumar Mishra

Acting Director of Enforcement Directorate
- In office 2023–2024
- Appointed by: Appointments Committee of the Cabinet
- Preceded by: Sanjay Kumar Mishra

Commissioner of Income Tax
- In office 2017–2017
- Appointed by: CBDT

Personal details
- Born: 3 July 1967 (age 59) Bihar, India
- Education: (B.Tech) (M.Tech) IIT Kanpur (MBA) Swinburne University of Technology
- Occupation: Bureaucrat

Rahul Navin (born 3 July 1967) is an Indian Revenue Service officer who has been the Director of Enforcement Directorate since August 2024.

Before that he served as the acting director of Enforcement Directorate (ED) from 2023 to 2024. His tenure saw the multiple investigations and arrests of high profile people like Arvind Kejriwal, K Kavitha Jharkhand CM Hemant Soren in 2024 and arrest of former UCO Bank chairman Subodh Kumar Goel in 2025.

== Early life and education ==
Rahul Navin was born on 3 July 1967 in India. He completed his Bachelor of Technology in 1990 and Master of Technology degree in 1993 both in Civil Engineering from IIT Kanpur. He has also completed his MBA from Swinburne University of Technology in Australia.

== Career ==
=== Civil Service ===
Navin joined Indian Revenue Service in 1993. He has nearly 30 years of experience in the Income Tax Department where he has served in numerous position such as Additional Course Director of the 63rd batch of the Indian Revenue Service.

He then worked in International Taxation Wing from 2004 to 2008 the wing raised demands on several offshore transactions including one in Vodafone case.

He then served as the Commissioner of Income Tax in 2017 before being appointed as Officer on Special Duty and Special Director in the Enforcement Directorate in November 2019. He has also served as Chief Vigilance Officer in the headquarters of ED after which the Government appointed him as acting director of ED due to abrupt end of Sanjay Kumar Mishra tenure after Supreme Court of India termed his extensions as illegal. In 2024 the Government appointed Navin as full director of ED for 2 years.

=== Enforcement Directorate ===
As the Director of Enforcement Directorate Navin has been involved in several high profile investigations. Notable ones include the arrest of then sitting Chief Minister of Delhi Arvind Kejriwal and other politicians from his party including Manish Sisodia and the agency also arrested Kalvakuntla Kavitha daughter of former Telangana Chief Minister K. Chandrashekhar Rao all of them were arrested in relation with Delhi Liquor Policy Case in 2024.

In January 2024, the agency also arrested former Jharkhand CM Hemant Soren in relation with the cases of Money Laundering.

Due to these investigations and arrests of several high profile politicians which coincided with 2024 Lok Sabha Election. The agency Enforcement Directorate led by Rahul Navin was accused by several opposition political parties of BJP for targeting their leaders before the incoming 2024 Lok Sabha Elections.

== Books and Publications ==
As an IRS officer and expert in taxation Rahul Navin has authored one book.

- Information Exchange and Tax Transparency - Tackling Global Tax Evasion and Avoidance. LexisNexis. 23 December 2016. ISBN 9350358891.
