= Income Tax Service (Group B) =

Income Tax Service, Group 'B'
Service Overview
Formed	1953
Headquarters	Cabinet Secretariat; Raisina Hill, New Delhi
Country	India
Training Grounds	1. National Academy of Direct Taxes (Nagpur)
Controlling Authority	Ministry of Finance, Government of India
Legal Personality	Governmental; Federal law enforcement
General Nature	Taxation; Revenue Administration
Cadre Size	3904 (Income Tax)

Service Chief
CBDT Chairman	Ravi Agarwal, IRS

Head of the Civil Services
- Cabinet Secretary; Current: Shri T.V. Somnathan IAS

The Income Tax Service, Group 'B' (Hindi: आयकर सेवा, ग्रुप 'बी') is the revenue service of the Government of India. It is the feeder service of the premier and elite Indian Revenue Service. The service functions under the Department of Revenue in the Union Ministry of Finance and is concerned with the collection and administration of the various direct accruing to the Union Government.

All officers of and up to the rank of Income Tax Officer belong to Group B (Income Tax officer (ITO) is gazetted while those below the rank of Income Tax Officer are non-gazetted). On reaching the rank of Assistant Commissioner they are accorded IRS (Group A) by the President of India.

== Ranks of the ITS ==
	Position / Pay Grade in the Government of India	Level and Rank	Order of Precedence (As per Presidential order)	Equivalent Position or Designation in the State Government(s)
1	47600 (6th pay Grade Pay-4800) and Senior Scale of Grade Pay of 5400 after 04 years in Pay Band-II	Income Tax Officer/Special Agent of Income Tax CID /Additional Assistant Director		Deputy Superintendent of Police/Assistant Commissioner of Police
2	44900 (6th pay Grade Pay-4600) in Pay Band-II	Inspector of Income Tax / Agent of Income Tax CID / Entry Level		Inspector of Police
3	Basic 35400 (6th pay Grade Pay-4200) in Pay Band-II	Office Superintendent		Sub Inspector of Police
4	25500 (6th pay Grade Pay-2400) in Pay Band-I	Tax Assistant / Entry-level		Assistant Sub Inspector of Police

== See also ==
- List of Income Tax Department officer ranks
- Civil Services of India
- All India Services
- Corruption in India
