= 1984 Rajya Sabha elections =

Rajya Sabha elections were held in 1984, to elect members of the Rajya Sabha, Indian Parliament's upper chamber.

== Elections ==
Elections were held in 1984 to elect members from various states. The list is incomplete.

=== Members elected ===
The following members are elected in the elections held in 1984. They are members for the term 1984-90 and retire in year 1990, except in case of the resignation or death before the term.

State - Member - Party

Rajya Sabha members for term 1984-1990
State	Member Name	Party	Remark
Arunachal Pradesh	Omem Moyong Deori	INC	res 19/03/1990
Andhra Pradesh	T. Chandrasekhar Reddy	INC	
Andhra Pradesh	B. Satyanarayan Reddy	TDP	res 11/02/1990
Andhra Pradesh	P. Upendra	TDP	
Andhra Pradesh	Prof C Lakshmanna	TDP	
Andhra Pradesh	P. Radhakrishna	TDP	
Andhra Pradesh	Y. S. Bhushana Rao	TDP	
Assam	Kamalendu Bhattacharjee	INC	R
Assam	Prithibi Majhi	INC	
Bihar	Chaturanan Mishra	CPI	
Bihar	Rajni Ranjan Sahu	INC	
Bihar	Rameshwar Thakur	INC	
Bihar	Durga Prasad Jamuda	INC	
Bihar	Bandhu Mahto	INC	
Bihar	Kailashpati Mishra	BJP	1
Bihar	Thakur Kamakhya Prasad Singh	INC	
Delhi	Vishwa Bandhu Gupta	INC	
Gujarat	Chimanbhai Mehta	INC	
Gujarat	Irshad Baig Mirza	INC	
Gujarat	Shankersinh Vaghela	BJP	res 27/11/1989
Gujarat	Valiullah Raoof	INC	
Haryana	Mukhtiar Singh Malik	INC	
Haryana	M P Kaushik	INC	dea 21/05/1987
Karnataka	M S Gurupadaswamy	JD	
Karnataka	M L Kollur	INC	
Karnataka	Sarojini Mahishi	JAN	
Karnataka	K G Thimme Gowda	JD	
Madhya Pradesh	Manhar Bhagatram	INC	
Madhya Pradesh	Suresh Pachouri	INC	
Madhya Pradesh	Vijaya Raje Scindia	BJP	Res 27/11/1989
Madhya Pradesh	Jagatpal Singh Thakur	INC	
Madhya Pradesh	Chandrika Prasad Tripathi	INC	
Maharashtra	Jagesh Desai	INC	
Maharashtra	Dr Bapu Kaldate	INC	
Maharashtra	N.K.P. Salve	INC	
Maharashtra	Prof N M Kamble	INC	res 09/08/1988
Maharashtra	Husen Dalwai	INC	28/12/1984
Maharashtra	Shakarrao N Deshmukh	INC	
Maharashtra	Sudha Vijay Joshi	INC	
Manipur	R.K. Jaichandra Singh	INC	Res 12/07/1988
Meghalaya	Jerlie E. Tariang	INC	
Mizoram	Dr C. Silvera	INC	28/11/1989
Nominated	Prof Asima Chatterjee	NOM	
Nominated	Thindivanam K Ramamurthy	INC	
Nominated	Ghluam Rasool Kar	INC	Disq 28/12/1987
Orissa	Kusum Ganeshwar	INC	
Orissa	Sabas Mohanty	INC	
Orissa	K Vasudeva Panicker	INC	Dea 03/05/1988
Orissa	Sunil Kumar Pattnaik	INC	
Punjab	Pawan Kumar Bansal	INC	
Punjab	Darbara Singh	INC	Dea 11/03/1990
Rajasthan	Bhim Raj	INC	
Rajasthan	K.K. Birla	INC	
Rajasthan	Shanti Pahadia	INC	
Tamil Nadu	V. Gopalsamy	DMK	
Tamil Nadu	Valampuri John	AIADMK	
Tamil Nadu	J. Jayalalithaa	AIADMK	res 28/01/1989
Tamil Nadu	N Ranjangam	AIADMK	
Tamil Nadu	V Ramanathan	AIADMK	
Tamil Nadu	K V Thangbalu	INC	
Uttar Pradesh	Arun Singh	INC	res 17/08/1988
Uttar Pradesh	Narendra Singh	INC	res 04/02/1985
Uttar Pradesh	Satya Prakash Malaviya	JD	
Uttar Pradesh	P N Sukul	INC	
Uttar Pradesh	Virendra Verma	JD	
Uttar Pradesh	Sohan Lal Dhusiya	INC	
Uttar Pradesh	Dr M H Kidwai	INC	
Uttar Pradesh	Sheo Kumar Mishra	INC	1
Uttar Pradesh	Dr Govind Das Richharia	INC	
Uttar Pradesh	Bir Bhadra Pratap Singh	INC	
Uttar Pradesh	Ram Chandra Vikal	INC	
West Bengal	Prof Saurin Bhattacharjee	RSP	
West Bengal	Amarprosad Chakraborty	FB	Dea 27/10/1985
West Bengal	Kanak Mukherjee	CPM	
West Bengal	Badri Narayan Pradhan	CPM	res 28/01/1986
West Bengal	Mostafa Bin Qausem	CPM	
West Bengal	Deba Prasad Ray	INC	

== Bye-elections ==
The following bye elections were held in the year 1984.

State - Member - Party

1. Bihar - Anand Prasad Sharma - INC (ele 22/08/1984 term till 1988)
2. West Bengal - Shantimoy Ghosh - CPM (ele 22/08/1984 term till 1987) dea 31/10/1986
