= Poonam Kishore Saxena =

- Education: Rajasthan University
- Police career
- Country: India
- Department: Central Board of Direct Taxes
- Service years: 1975 - current
- Status: Former CBDT Chairman
- Rank: Special Secretary to the Government of India

Poonam Kishore Saxena (born 27 March 1953) is a retired Indian Revenue Service (IRS) officer of the 1975 batch and the former Chairperson in the rank of Secretary of the Central Board of Direct Taxes (CBDT). She was the Director General of the Directorate General of Income Tax Investigation, the Director General of Administration, Recovery and Appeals and has also served as Member, CBDT before joining as the CBDT Chairman in April 2012 for a two-year tenure. She also served in senior positions in the Income Tax in Patna and Delhi. She was selected by the Appointments Committee of the Cabinet.
