= Sanjay Kumar Mishra =

Member of Economic Advisory Council of India

Sanjay Kumar Mishra IRS (Retd.)
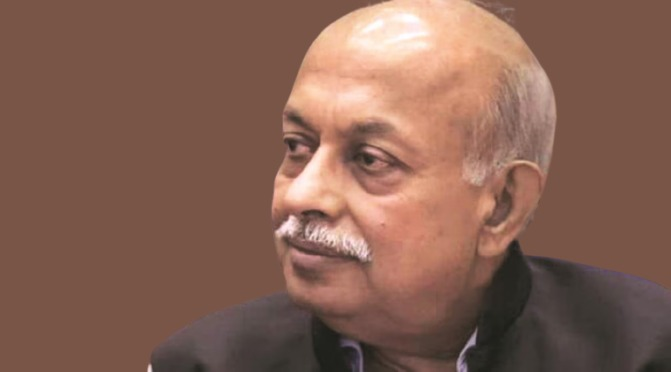

Full Time Member of Economic Advisory Council to the Prime Minister
- Incumbent
- Assumed office 1 April 2025
- Appointed by: Appointments Committee of the Cabinet

Director of Enforcement Directorate
- In office 19 November 2018 – 15 September 2023
- Appointed by: Appointments Committee of the Cabinet
- Preceded by: Karnal Singh
- Succeeded by: Rahul Navin

Chief Commissioner of Income Tax of Delhi
- Appointed by: Appointments Committee of the Cabinet

Personal details
- Born: 30 May 1960 (age 66) Lucknow, India
- Education: (MS) University of Lucknow
- Occupation: Bureaucrat

Sanjay Kumar Mishra (born 30 May 1960) is a retired Indian Revenue Service officer of 1984 batch who is currently serving as the Full Time Member of Economic Advisory Council to the Prime Minister since April 2025. He previously served as Director of Enforcement Directorate from 2018 to 2023 where his tenure saw multiple controversial investigations and extradition requests on many popular Indian economic fugitives.

== Early life and education ==
Sanjay Kumar Mishra was born on 30 May 1960 in Lucknow in a middle class family. He completed his Master of Science degree in Biochemistry from University of Lucknow.

== Civil Service career ==
Before joining Indian Revenue Service, Mishra after graduating with a biochemistry degree from the University of Lucknow, worked as an immunology researcher at the Central Drug Research Institute in Lucknow and published more than 10 research papers in International and National Science Journals.

Mishra passed the UPSC Civil Services Examination on his first attempt and went on to join the Indian Revenue Service of Income Tax cadre in 1984.

His initial appointment came as an Assistant Director of the Income Tax department in Gorakhpur. Within 4 years in this post his first stint with Enforcement Directorate came when he got the charge of its Agra and Jaipur operation handling cases under Foreign Exchange Regulation Act.

In 1994, he was posted back to his Income Tax cadre under which he served in Ahemdabad for 9 years. He then worked in Kolhapur Maharashtra before being transferred back to Delhi in 2006. He then served as Joint Secretary in the Ministry of Finance which was then followed by a stint in the Ministry of Home Affairs.

In October 2018, he was given an additional incharge as Director of Enforcement Directorate for three months which was then converted into full appointment of 2 years based on the notification issued by Appointments Committee of the Cabinet headed by the Prime Minister of India.

== Controversy ==
Mishra's tenure as director of ED involved multiple extensions beyond the normal 2 year term appointment with first being granted in 2020 when the Central Government retrospectively modified the norm. Subsequently he was granted more extensions in 2021 with Supreme Court of India uphelding his extension of 2021.

On November 18, 2022 the Modi government again extended the tenure of SK Mishra until November 2023. But in July 2023 the Supreme Court of India declared his third extension as illegal and ordered he would serve until 31 July 2023.

However, at the request of the Central Government the Court finally extended his tenure until September 15, 2023.

== As the director of ED ==
Mishra's 5 year tenure was considered one of the longest and controversial. Under his tenure the agency allegedly targeted political opponents of Bhartiya Janata Party. Notable examples were the raid against Former Finance Minister of India P Chidambaram and his son, Jharkhand Chief Minister Hemant Soren, Karnataka Congress chief DK Shivakumar, former Maharashtra minister Anil Deshmukh and Aam Admi Party leaders like Manish Sisodia and Satyendra Jain.

Under five year tenure the agency took around 4000 cases and conducted 3000 searches. He also hired outside experts and professionals for the implementation of Prevention of Money Laundering Act.

Under Mishra's tenure Enforcement Directorate got the approval from the government to initiate extradition actions against economic fugitives like Nirav Modi, Vijay Mallya and arms dealer Sanjay Bhandari.

== Member of Economic Advisory Council ==
In March 2025, the Modi Government appointed Sanjay Mishra as the full time member of the Economic Advisory Council to the Prime Minister.
