= Sushil Chandra =

Former Chief Election Commissioner of India

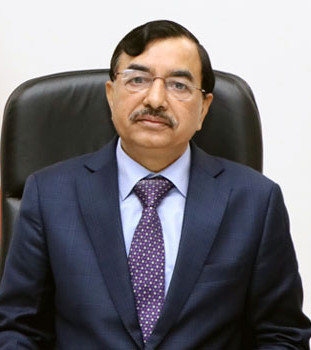

24th Chief Election Commissioner of India
- In office 13 April 2021 – 14 May 2022
- President: Ram Nath Kovind
- Preceded by: Sunil Arora
- Succeeded by: Rajiv Kumar

Election Commissioner of India
- In office 15 February 2019 – 12 April 2021
- Preceded by: Sunil Arora
- Succeeded by: Anup Chandra Pandey

Chairperson of the Central Board of Direct Taxes
- In office 1 November 2016 – 14 February 2019
- Preceded by: Rani Singh Nair
- Succeeded by: Pramod Chandra Mody

Personal details
- Born: 15 May 1957 (age 69) Chandausi, Uttar Pradesh, India
- Education: IIT Roorkee (B-Tech), DAV College, Dehradun (LLB)
- Occupation: Retd. IRS (IT) officer

Sushil Chandra (born 15 May 1957) is a 1980 batch IRS (IT) officer. He was the 24th Chief Election Commissioner of India. He previously served as the Chairperson of the Central Board of Direct Taxes.

== Personal life ==
Sushil Chandra was born on 15 May 1957 in Chandausi UP. He completed B-Tech from Roorkee University and LLB from DAV College, Dehradun. He has also attended various trainings at the IMF, Indian Institute of Management Bangalore and the Wharton School on management.

== Career ==
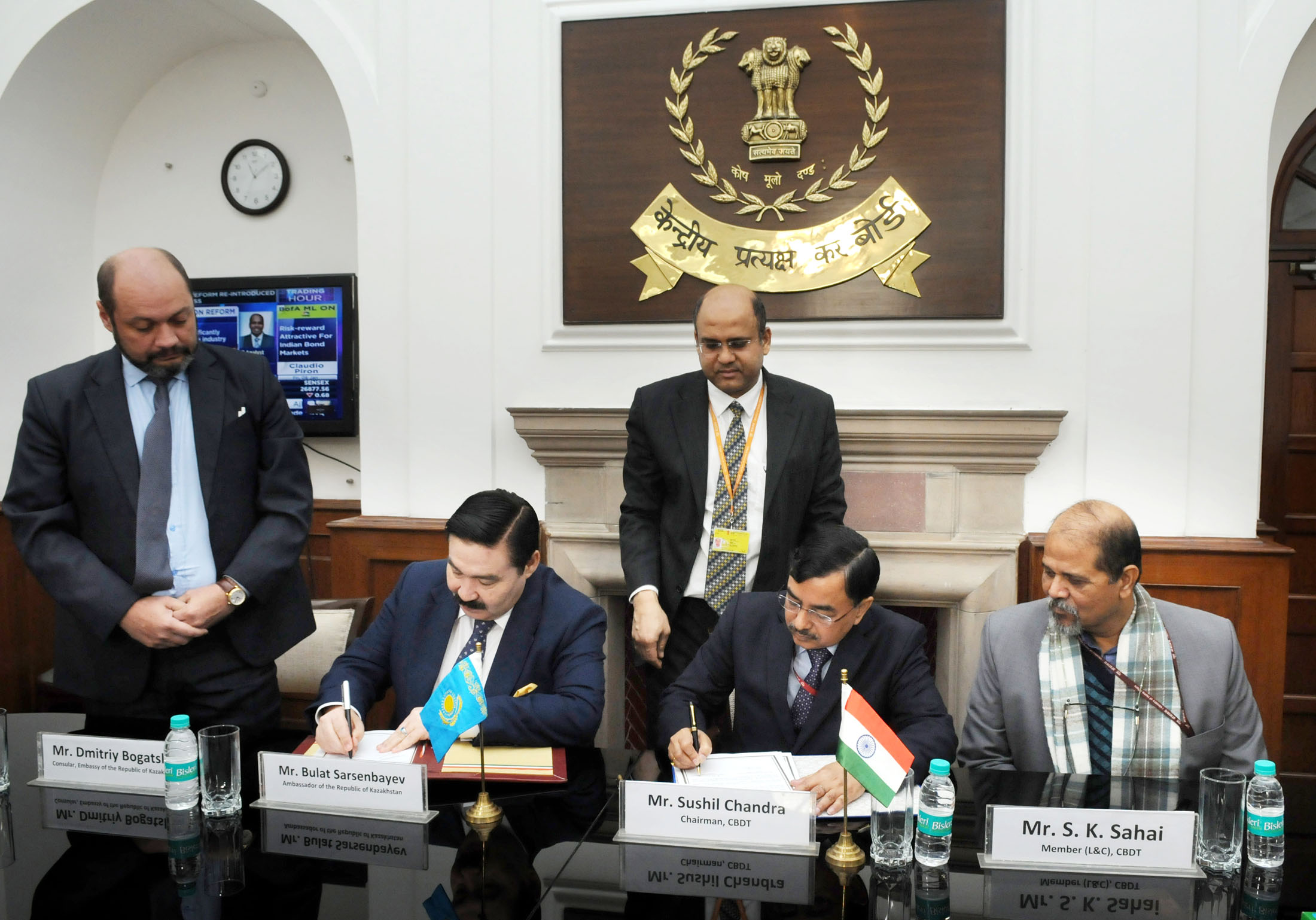
Sushil Chandra and the Ambassador of the Republic of Kazakhstan to India, Mr. Bulat Sarsenbayev signing a Protocol to amend the existing Double Taxation Avoidance Convention (DTAC) between India and Kazakhstan, in New Delhi

He started his career in the Indian Engineering Service. Later joined the 1980 Batch of the Indian Revenue Service. Under his chairmanship of the Central Board of Direct Taxes he contributed greatly to the Operation Clean Money.

He has been Commissioner of Income Tax (Appeals) International Taxation, Delhi. He was also the Director of Investigation, Mumbai and Director General Investigation, Gujarat. On 15 February 2019, he was appointed as the Election Commissioner of India and took office as the Chief Election Commissioner of India on 13 April 2021.

He has been involved in 16 elections including five as chief election commissioner. He retired on 14 May 2022, Rajiv Kumar succeeded him. In, February 2024 he was appointed as a non-judicial member of Lokpal where he served till 14 May 2027.
