= Daya Shankar =

Daya Shankar may refer to:

- Daya Shankar (admiral) (1912-1993), Indian Navy admiral
- Daya Shankar (IRS officer), Indian Revenue Service officer
- Daya Shankar (cricketer), Indian cricketer
- Daya Shankar, a character portrayed by Shiney Ahuja in the 2006 Indian film Gangster
