= Vishwa Bandhu Gupta =

Indian activist

- Born: Vishwa Bandhu Gupta; 1950 (age 75–76); Delhi
- Other name: Bandhu
- Movement: Indian anti-corruption movement, Peace movement

Vishwa Bandhu Gupta (popularly known as Vishwa Bandhu) is an Indian social activist. He is a former Indian Revenue Service officer who served in the Income Tax Department and was suspended as an Additional Commissioner after he issued a tax summons to the Vishwa Hindu Parishad.

== Vocal opponent of the VDIS scheme ==
When the deputy director or Additional Commissioner of Income Tax asked the Vishwa Hindu Parishad to furnish its income tax returns for 1989–90, the notice was squashed and although the Income tax department asked the VHP to submit details, the Central Government did not investigate the case and he was transferred to Madras and then he was suspended. In 2000, Gupta also spoke against corruption in cricket and made an allegation on unnamed former Indian Cricket Captain to have declared ₹160 Million in the Voluntary Disclosure of Income Scheme (VDIS) in 1997. He suspected abuse of the VDIS by criminals.
