= Commissioner of Income Tax (Appeals) =

When taxpayers dispute the income tax demands raised on them, a structured appeal process has to be followed. The first level of appeals lies with the CIT (A). The Central Board of Direct Taxes (CBDT) has on 19 June 2015, issued internal instructions directing that all Commissioner of Income Tax (Appeals) should issue appellate orders within 15 days of the last hearing.
