= Income Tax Department Karnataka & Goa =

Income Tax Department of Karnataka and Goa
- Abbreviation: I-T
- Motto: Revenue is the backbone of the Government

Jurisdictional structure
- Operations jurisdiction: Karnataka and Goa, India
- Area: 195,000 km^{2} (75,000 sq mi)
- Population: 31,841,374
- Legal jurisdiction: Karnataka and Goa
- General nature: Civilian police

Operational structure
- Overseen by: Ministry of Finance
- Headquarters: Income Tax Headquarters, Central Revenue Building Bangalore
- Elected officers responsible: Nirmala Sitaraman (Finance Minister); Jayant Sinha (Revenue Minister)
- Agency executive: Chaitali Panmei, IRS, Principal Chief Commissioner of Income Tax
- Parent agency: Government of India
- Departments: 12: Administration; Intelligence; Cyber Support Cell; Special Branch; TDS; Salary; Corporate; Investigation Wing; Central Range; Special Ranges

Website
- www.incometaxbengaluru.org

The Income Tax Department Karnataka & Goa is the revenue enforcement and collection agency for the state of Karnataka and Goa, India. It has its headquarters in Bangalore, the state capital. The Direct Taxes Regional Training Institute was built in Bangalore at Jalahalli. Karnataka Department has a reputation for being one of the best managed income tax forces in the country, and one of largest revenue earning departments.

It is headed by the Principal Chief Commissioner of Income Tax assisted by Chief Commissioners of Income Tax and each division is headed by Commissioners of Income Tax. The Director General of Income Tax heads the Investigation Wing and supervises the Criminal Investigation and Intelligence Wing, current Director General of Investigation is Shri Patanjali. Karnataka & Goa has highest growth rate in I-T collection.

== Jurisdiction ==
The jurisdiction of this charge extends to the states of Karnataka & Goa. The geographical area covered is 1,95,000 Sq. km with a population of 4.63 crores. The total distance between the North & South i.e. IT Office at Bidar to the IT Office at Mysore is 800 km and the distance between East & West i.e. IT Office at Mangalore to IT Office at Kolar is 500 km. The main industrial activities of the Karnataka & Goa Region are manufacture of silks, coffee, arecanut, electronics, aircraft, Heavy Engineering, telephones, watches, sandalwood activities, handicraft, software, fertilizers, fisheries, food canning, liquor, exports of iron & manganese ore, mining, shipping & scientific research.

== See also ==
- Income Tax Department
- Indian Revenue Service
