= Income Tax Appellate Tribunal =

First experiment in tribunalization in India

Agency overview
- Formed: January 1941
- Jurisdiction: CBDT
- Headquarters: Mumbai, India
- Agency executives: Justice Chandrakant Vasant Bhadang, (President); Rajpal Yadav, (Vice President) Chandigarh; Mahavir Singh, (Vice President) Delhi; Kul Bharat, (Vice President) Lucknow; Vijay Pal Rao, (Vice President) Hyderabad; George George K., (Vice President) Chennai; Duvvuru RL Reddy, (Vice President) Kolkata; Saktijit Dey, (Vice President) Mumbai; Maharishi Prashant Kumar, (Vice President) Bangalore
- Parent department: Income Tax Department
- Parent agency: Ministry of Law and Justice, Department of Legal Affairs
- Website: itat.gov.in

India's Income Tax Appellate Tribunal (ITAT) was the first experiment in tribunalization in the history of India. It was set up on 25 January 1941 by virtue of section 5A of the Income Tax Act, 1922. It is second appellate authority under the direct taxes and first independent forum in its appellate hierarchy. The orders passed by the ITAT can be subjected to appellate challenge, on substantial questions of law, before the respective High Court.

With a view to ensure highest degree of independence of the ITAT, it functions under the Department of Legal Affairs in the Ministry of Law and Justice, and is kept away from any kind of control by the Ministry of Finance. Justice Chandrakant Vasant Bhadang a retired Judge of Bombay High Court has been appointed as president of the tribunal on 23 October 2023.

The appeals before the Income Tax Appellate Tribunal are generally heard by a division bench- consisting of one judicial member and one accountant member. In cases involving assessed income of less than₹15 lakh (US$16,000), however, any one Member, though with a work experience of minimum five years in the Tribunal, can decide the appeals in a single member bench as well. Monetary limit for deciding an appeal by a single member Bench of ITAT enhanced from ₹15 lakh (US$16,000) to ₹50 lakh (US$52,000) in 2016 Union budget of India. In case of conflict of opinions by the division benches on the issues involved in an appeal, the appeals are sometimes heard by the special benches consisting of three of more members- at least one of which must be a judicial member and at least one of which must be an accountant member.

The Indian Income Tax Appellate Tribunal is considered to be a very successful experiment in tribunalization and is often cited to justify more steps in this direction.

== Form 36 for appeal ==
Form 36 is to be filed to file an appeal. The grounds of appeal, and order of the appeal is also to be attached along with Form 36.

== Time limit for appeal ==
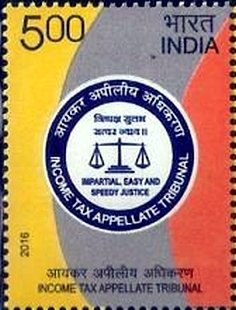
Stamp of India 2016 Income Tax Appellate Tribunal

The appeal can be filed within 60 days of date of order against which the appeal is to be filed.

In case 60 days are lapsed, then the appeal may be filed with an application of condonation of delay. On such filing the application may be allowed depending on the circumstances of the delay.
