= Pramod Chandra Mody =

Secretary-General of the Rajya Sabha since 2021

Pramod Chandra Mody IRS (Retd.)
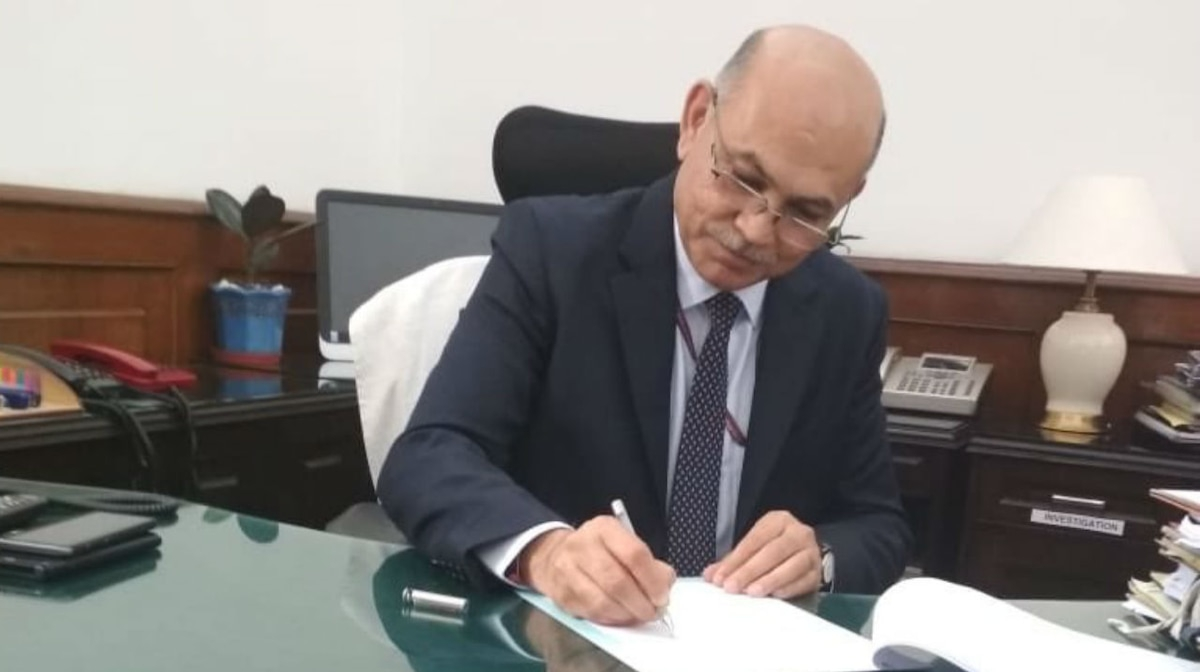
- Mody in 2022

13th Secretary General of the Rajya Sabha
- Incumbent
- Assumed office 12 November 2021
- Chairman: C. P. Radhakrishnan (from 2025); Jagdeep Dhankhar (2022–2025); Venkaiah Naidu (till 2022)
- Preceded by: P. P. K. Ramacharyulu

Chairperson of the Central Board of Direct Taxes
- In office 1 February 2019 – 31 May 2021
- Preceded by: Sushil Chandra
- Succeeded by: Jagannath Bidyadhar Mahapatra

Personal details
- Born: 1 September 1959 (age 67) Bombay, Bombay State, India (present-day Mumbai, Maharashtra)
- Spouse: Poonam Mody (m. 1983)
- Children: 2
- Education: (B.A. Hons.) St. Stephen's College, Delhi Delhi University (LL.B.) Government Law College, Mumbai
- Occupation: Civil servant; bureaucrat
- Employer: Indian Revenue Service

Pramod Chandra Mody (born 1 September 1959) is a retired Indian Revenue Service officer of the 1982-batch. He is currently serving as 13th Secretary General of the Rajya Sabha since November 2021. He served as Chairperson of the Central Board of Direct Taxes from February 2019 to May 2021. He had one of the longest tenures as CBDT chief.

== Life and education ==
Pramod Chandra Mody was born on 1 September 1959 in Mumbai. He completed his B.A degree from St Stephen's College, Delhi affiliated with Delhi University and his LLB degree from Government Law College, Mumbai and has a Diploma in Journalism from KC College of Journalism Mumbai. He is married to Poonam Mody since 22 November 1983 and they have one son and one daughter.
