= National Academy of Direct Taxes =

Civil service training institution

- राष्ट्रीय प्रत्यक्ष कर अकादमी
- Logo of NADT
- Motto: कोष मूलों दंड:
- Motto in English: fund root penalty
- Type: civil service training institute
- Established: 1970; 56 years ago
- Parent institution: Income Tax Department
- Affiliations: CBDT
- Academic affiliations: Ministry of Finance (India)
- Director General: Satpal Gulati, IRS
- Location: Nagpur,, Maharashtra, India
- Campus: Urban
- Language: English
- Website: nadt.gov.in
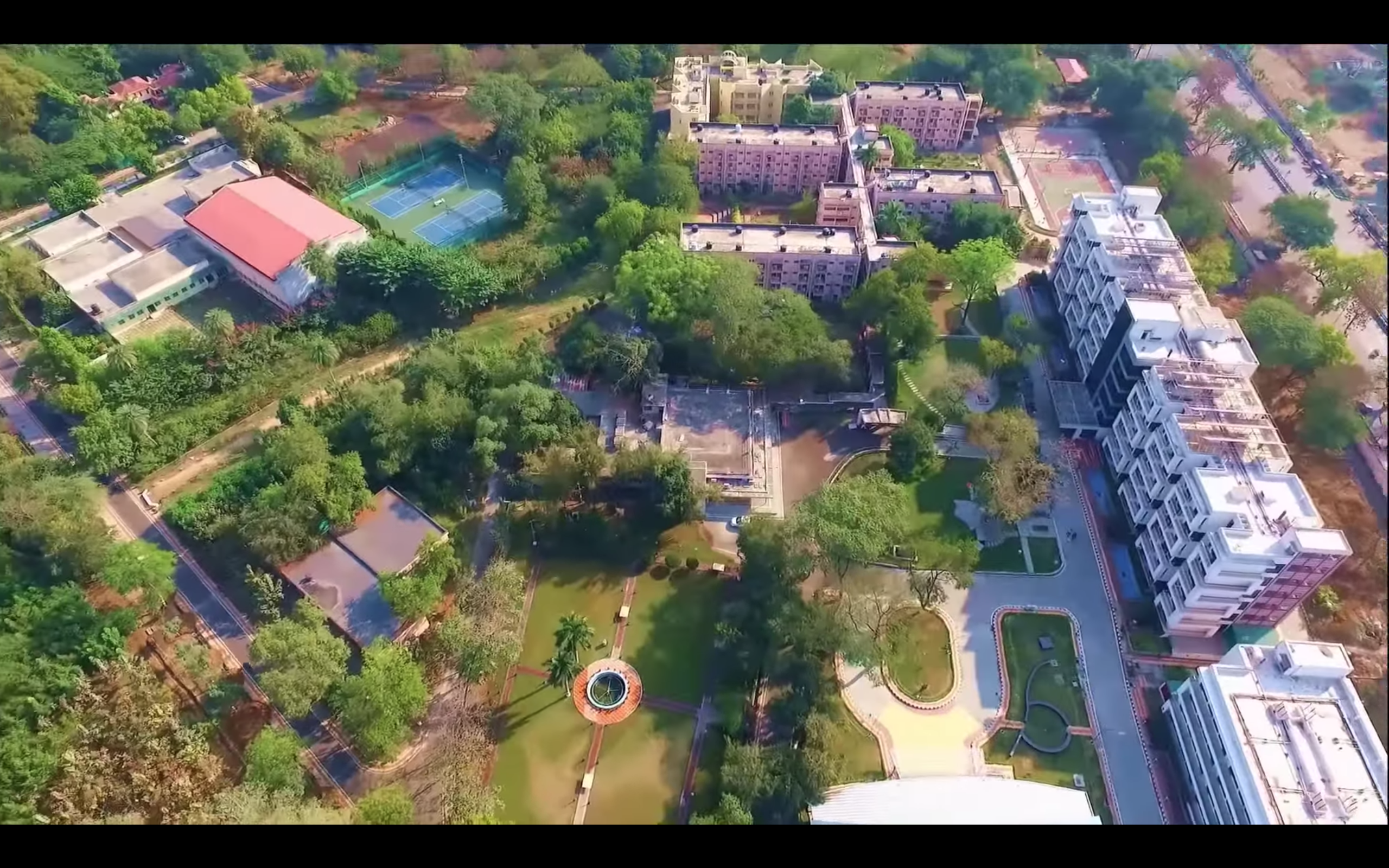

The National Academy of Direct Taxes (NADT) is the apex civil service training institution of the Indian Revenue Service and the Income Tax Department of the Government of India. Over the years, it has enhanced and embellished national interest by moulding human capital fortunes and functioning as a ‘best-interests’ think-tank in tax policy and administration. The Academy imparts proficiency in core competency areas, disseminates information about the best of academics and practices and provides an international perspective, high quality professional capabilities and cultural sensitivities to officers.

The academy's main purpose is to train civil service officers of the Indian Revenue Service. But over the years after UPSC and DOPT clearance it also trains officers of the Indian Police Service, Indian Foreign Service, Indian Ordnance Factories Service, Indian Postal Service, Indian Railway officers, Central Bureau of Investigation, Enforcement Directorate Indian Posts and Telegraphs Accounts and Finance Service, Indian Audits and Accounts Service, Indian Corporate Law Service, Indian Civil Accounts Service and the Indian Cost Accounts Service. Dr. Sibichen K. Mathew is the Principal Director General of the Academy since 2025.

== History ==
Organised training of Indian Revenue Service officers recruited through the civil services examination conducted by Union Public Service Commission began at Nagpur on 5 February 1957 and the academy took its final shape in 1981. Since then National Academy of Direct Taxes has grown in the number of officers trained and in its facilities, quality and repute. Its training programmes have consistently received international recognition and commendation. The Academy, along with its seven Regional Training Institutes and 46 Ministerial Staff Training Units located across the country, caters to the training needs of nearly 50,000 officers and staff of the Income Tax Department in India. More than 100 training courses and seminars are conducted each year at its various campuses.

== Organisation ==
The academy is headed by the Principal Director General equivalent to the Rank of Special Secretary to Government of India. He/she is assisted by three Additional Director Generals equivalent to rank of Joint Secretary to Govt. of India, eight Addl./Joint Directors and 13 Deputy/Assistant Directors.

The Pr DGIT (Training) is the training coordinator for the Income-tax department. He/she has the overall responsibility of planning, organising and conducting the induction training courses for the probationers as well as organising in-service training programmes for senior officers of the Department.

The Pr DGIT (Training) also supervises the functioning of ten Regional Training Institutes at Bangalore, Kolkata, Hyderabad, Lucknow, Mumbai, Chennai, Chandigarh, Ahmedadabad, Hazaribagh and Bhopal and 46 Ministerial Staff Training Units spread all over the country. These institutes impart training to various cadres of the Income Tax Department within their jurisdictions.

Broadly, it is organised into Administration and Faculty Wings. Administration looks after the infrastructure facilities in the academy and works in their maintenance. It also looks after the Planning and Research Wing and Library. Faculty Wing looks after the Induction courses and supports the training programs. Planning and Research wing organises seminars and courses for the senior officers in service and it also manages the Publications Division of the Academy.

== Mandate of the Academy ==
The Academy was given the following mandate by the Central Board of Direct Taxes. Under the supervision of Director General of Income Tax (Training) it is responsible for following:

- Planning, designing and conducting the induction/foundational training course for the officers of Indian Revenue Service and of other services who are selected through UPSC.
- Planning, designing and conducting in-service training courses both at National Academy of Direct Taxes and the Regional Training Institutes.
- Nominating various officers for different training courses conducted in either National Academy of Direct Taxes or in the Regional Training Institutes.
- Conducting research for identification of the new training needs of personnel in the Department and also on the efficacy of the training being given to probationers.
- Preparation of course materials, background papers etc. for the courses to be conducted from time to time on the basis of research studies.
- Control, organisation and development of the National Academy of Direct Taxes library.
- Coordination of international courses on direct taxes conducted in India.
- Coordination between the IT Department and the Department of Personnel in framing the training policy for departmental personnel.
- Organising paid courses for other Indian and foreign organisations.
- Design and conduct of specialised courses abroad on direct taxes for developing countries.

== Induction course ==
Flagship course of the academy is its Sixteen month long Induction Course for the fresh recruits into the Indian Revenue Service. The Induction training is divided into two modules and after completion of each module there would be departmental examination conducted. Clearing the exams is mandatory for confirmation in the service.

In the first module, emphasis is on giving intense theoretical inputs on the subjects of Theoretical Concepts and Practical Application of Direct Taxes Laws, Advanced Accounting and Finance and Business Laws-I. During the First Module, Industrial Attachment for a week in February is followed by five-day appreciation course for Parliamentary Processes and Procedures by Parliament Secretariat around the budget session is arranged at New Delhi. This modules also includes joint training opportunities with officers from other wings of government such as IAS, IFS and Indian Revenue Service (C&CE) at their respective academies. Recently, Ten days attachment with Indian Army is also cleared. After completing four months of training, there will be two-week-long On-The-Job Training where the Officer Trainees will be attached to the field formations. The first module ends with First Departmental Examination.

The second module commences with another On-The-Job Training for around eight weeks. This is followed by International Attachment for a period of two weeks. On return from these, the Officer Trainees will be given inputs on the subjects of ‘Procedure/Techniques of Investigation and Drafting of Orders and Reports’, ‘Information Technology and Operations’, ‘Strategic and Operational Management’ and ‘Business Laws-II’. During this module, a number of guest lectures, both from and outside the Department, are organised. The second Departmental Examinations are conducted at the end of the module. Officer trainees are expected to submit a report which would be scrutinised both by the Academy and Nalsar University of Law which is then considered for awarding of Masters in Business Laws and Taxation under an MOU. In the last weeks of the Module Officer Trainees are taken on Bharat Darshan to familiarise them with various parts of Nation.

== National Academy of Direct Taxes, Regional Campus ==
Erstwhile called the Direct Taxes Regional Training Institutes, the National Academy of Direct Taxes, Regional Campuses were established to look after the training needs of officers and staff of the Department. They cater to needs of training of the officers and officials within their jurisdiction. They are located at Bhopal, Chennai, Mumbai, Bengaluru, Chandigarh, Ahmedabad, Lucknow, Kolkata, Delhi, Hazaribagh.

They also assist other govt departments, banks, corporates etc. with training and the expertise of the faculty is also sought by other training institutes, law schools, banks and industry. They also supervise Ministerial Staff Training Units with in their jurisdiction. National Academy of Direct Taxes is aggressively pursuing modernization of infrastructure of the Direct Taxes Regional Training Institutes as the human resource needs of the Income Tax Department is on a rise. Recently, Bangalore DTRTI's state of the art new campus was inaugurated by the Honourable Finance Minister.

== Other courses ==
Academy also conducts many in-service training courses and Out reach programs for senior members of the Income Tax Department. Academy also collaborates with OECD and other international organisations in cutting edge areas such as transfer pricing and international taxation. Officer Trainees from various South Asian nations such as Bhutan and Bangladesh also come for training at the academy

Academy has also begun conducting the Foundation Course for the Central Civil Services and All India Services recruits since 2010.

== Infrastructure ==
National Academy of Direct Taxes is spread on a sprawling campus of 67 acres and is known for its green cover. It is also a place with modern infrastructure. Vikramshila newly inaugurated hostel with 156 rooms is built at a cost of 241.0 million and it meets the world standards. The Advanced Training Center which is being built at a cost of 1 billion would be completed with in a year's time.

Academy's hostels are named after the places of learning. Nalanda, Vikramshila are probationers hostels and Takshashila is for the exclusive use of senior officers attending in-service courses. Academy also has a Vaishali Guesthouse for the visiting dignitaries. The academy also has a state of art sports infrastructure consisting of C.C. Ganapathy Indoor Sports Complex and an Outdoor ground with in the campus. It also has a library with latest books and subscriptions to wide variety of national, international journals and magazines.

Academy has a tradition of Shramdan, where batches of Probationers leave something behind. Some contributions include Amphitheater and Lumbini, Jetavana, Shalimar Garden in the campus. The campus life is made more colourful and engaging through the activities of various Hobby Clubs and visits of eminent people from various walks of life who lecture, meet and discuss with the young probationers.

== Other activities ==
Academy also publishes a regular bimonthly newsletter, NADTree which deals with activities inside the Campus and in the Regional Campuses of National Academy of Direct Taxes. Its another initiative is NADT Connect a full-fledged social networking portal for connecting the various batches of Indian Revenue Service.

Academy is run by a dedicated team of officials and several initiatives taken in the Academy and Direct Taxes Regional Training Institutes has been documented in the Let Us Share: Annual Compilation of Best Practices and Orders of the Income Tax Department.
