= Indian Revenue Service (Income Tax) =

Administrative revenue service of the Indian government

Indian Revenue Service Bhāratīya Rājasva Sevā
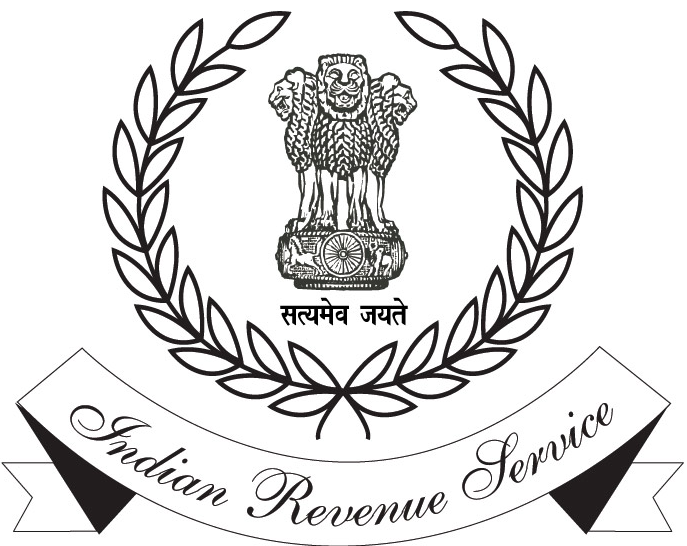
- IRS (Income Tax)

Service overview
- Founded: 1944; 82 years ago (as Income Tax Service); 1953; 73 years ago (as Indian Revenue Service IT)
- Headquarters: North Block, New Delhi
- Country: India
- Staff colleges: 1. National Academy of Direct Taxes, Nagpur, Maharashtra
- Cadre controlling authority: Department of Revenue, Ministry of Finance
- Minister responsible: Nirmala Sitaraman, Minister of Finance
- Legal personaliity: Governmental civil service
- Cadre strength: 4192 (Income Tax)
- Selection: Civil Services Examination
- Associations: 1. Indian Revenue Service IT Association

Service chief
- Chairperson, CBDT: Ravi Agarwal, IRS

Head of the civil services
- Cabinet Secretary: T. V. Somanathan, IAS

The Indian Revenue Service (Income Tax) (IAST: Bhāratīya Rājasva Sevā), often abbreviated as IRS (IT), is the administrative revenue service of the Government of India. As a Central Service, it functions under the Department of Revenue of the Ministry of Finance and is under the administrative direction of the Revenue Secretary and the ministerial command of the Minister of Finance. The IRS is primarily responsible for collecting and administering direct taxes accruing to the Government of India.

The IRS (Income Tax) is controlled by a statutory body, the Central Board of Direct Taxes (CBDT) which reports to Revenue Secretary in Ministry of Finance. The duties of the IRS (IT) include providing tax assistance to taxpayers, pursuing and resolving instances of erroneous or fraudulent tax filings, and formulating and enforcing policy concerning income tax in India.

In the 2015 fiscal year, the IRS (IT) processed 39,128,247 returns and collected ₹6.95797 lakh crore (equivalent to ₹11 trillion or US$120 billion in 2026) in gross revenue, spending ₹6 (equivalent to ₹10 or 11¢ US in 2026) for every ₹1,000 (equivalent to ₹1,600 or US$18 in 2026) it collected. The relative contribution of direct tax to the overall tax collection of the Central Government has risen from about 36% to 56% over the period of 2000–01 to 2013–14. The contribution of direct tax-to-GDP has doubled (from about 3% to 6%) during the same period.

== History ==
Direct tax in the form of an income tax was introduced by the British in India in 1860 to overcome the difficulties created by the Indian Rebellion of 1857. The organizational history of the Income-tax Department, however, starts in the year 1922, when the Income-tax Act, 1922 gave, for the first time, a specific nomenclature to various Income-tax authorities. In 1924, the Central Board of Revenue Act constituted a Central Board of Revenue – the statutory body with functional responsibilities for the administration of the Income-Tax Act.

Commissioners of Income tax were appointed for each province, and Assistant Commissioners and tax officers were placed under their control. Officers from the Imperial Civil Services (ICS) occupied the top posts, and the lower echelons were filled through promotions from the ranks. The Income Tax Service was established in 1944, and was subsequently reconstituted as the Indian Revenue Service (Income Tax) in 1953.

In 1963, given the increasingly complex roles and responsibilities of administering direct tax in India, the Central Board of Direct Taxes was constituted as a statutory body under the Central Board of Revenue Act, 1963.

== Recruitment ==
There are two streams of recruitment to the Indian Revenue Service. IRS officers may enter the IRS by passing the Civil Services Examination (CSE). The CSE is a three-stage competitive selection process consisting of a preliminary examination, the main examination, and an interview. It is administered by the Union Public Service Commission (UPSC). IRS officers recruited in this way are called direct recruits.

Some IRS officers are also recruited from Central Services (Group B) of Income Tax Service (Group B). Group 'B' officers are gradually promoted over several years of service. The current ratio of the two streams at the entry-level is kept at 1:1. All IRS officers, regardless of their mode of entry, are appointed by the President of India.

== Training ==
After selection, successful candidates undergo a 3-month Foundation Course at the Lal Bahadur Shastri National Academy of Administration (LBSNAA) in Mussoorie, Uttarakhand.

Thereafter, IRS (IT) Officer Trainees (OTs) undergo a 16-month specialised training at the National Academy of Direct Taxes (NADT), in Nagpur, Maharashtra.

=== National Academy of Direct Taxes ===
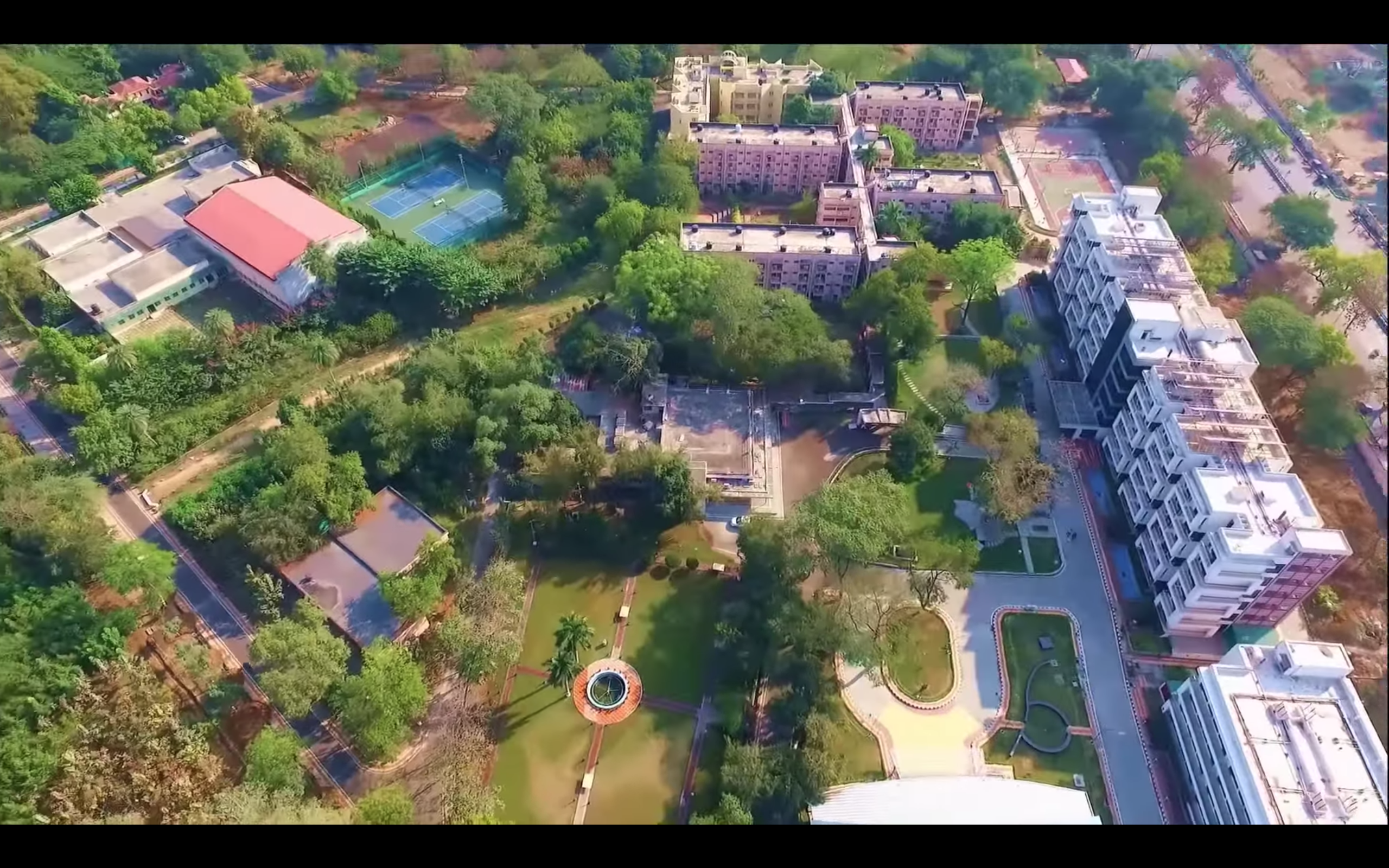
National Academy of Direct Taxes in Nagpur, Maharashtra is the staff training college of the IRS (IT).

Sixteen months of Induction Training is conducted for the directly recruited officers of IRS (IT) at NADT each year. The training is designed as two modules to enable the Officer Trainees to acquire the knowledge and skills they need to function effectively and efficiently as tax administrators. In particular, training prepares OTs to deliver quality taxpayer services, detect and penalize non-compliance, and understand the macroeconomic, taxation, and fiscal policy of the Government of India to maximize revenue.

==== First module ====
The First Module emphasizes giving intense theoretical inputs in the subjects such as Theoretical Concepts and Practical Application of Direct Tax Laws, Advanced Accounting and Finance, and Business Laws-I. It also includes a week-long Parliamentary Attachment, and a two-week Field Attachment. OTs also undergo short-duration training at NACIN, Faridabad, LBSNAA, Mussoorie, and the Sardar Vallabhbhai Patel National Police Academy (SVPNPA), Hyderabad. The first Departmental Examinations are conducted at the end of the first module.

==== Second module ====
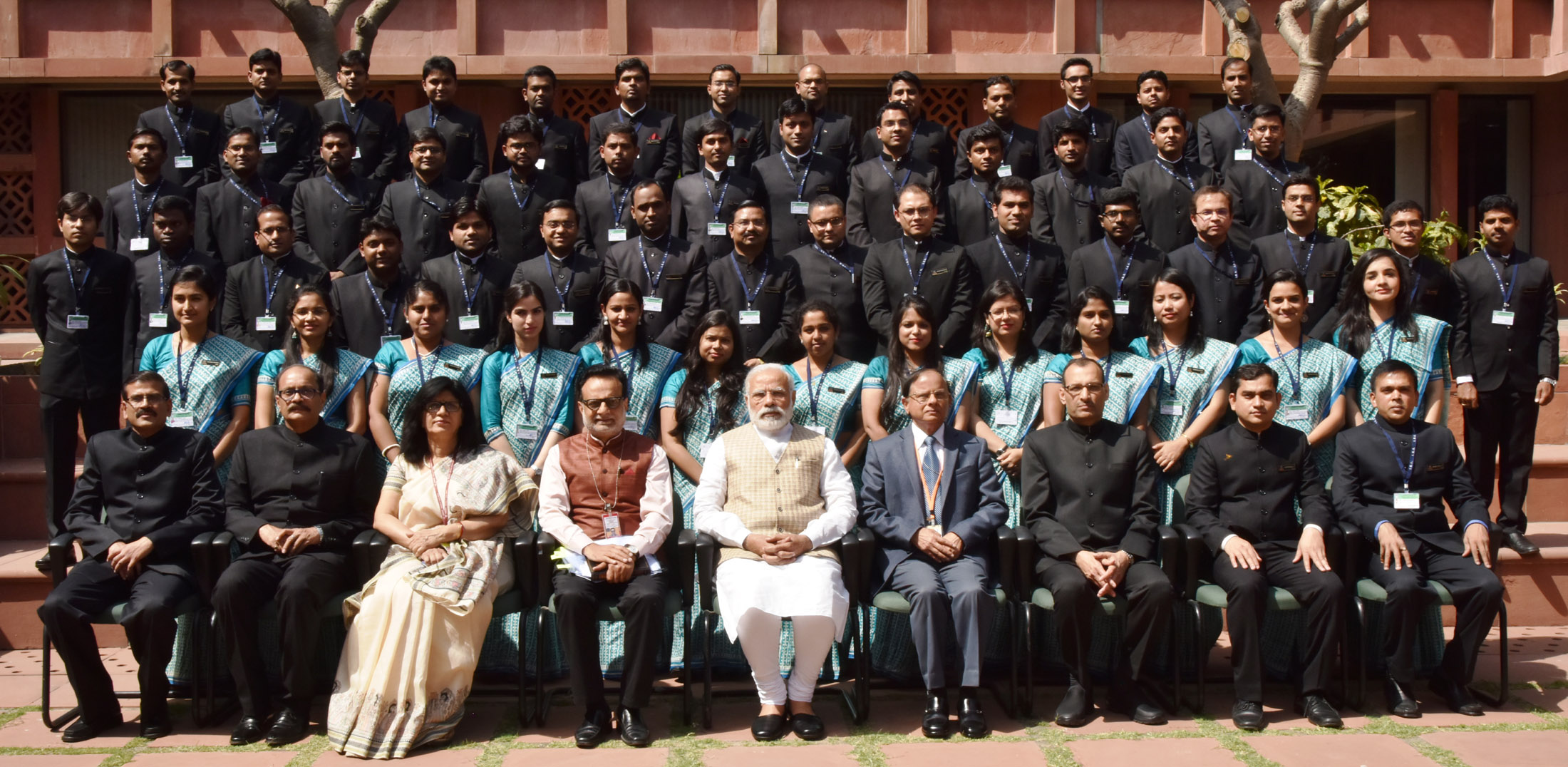
The Prime Minister, Shri Narendra Modi with the Officer Trainees of the Indian Revenue Service (IT) Probationers of 70th Batch, in New Delhi

The second module includes On-The-Job Training for around eight weeks, followed by Bharat Darshan, and a Financial Attachment for 2 weeks. Furthermore, earlier OTs are also exposed to international tax practices through a one- or two-week International Attachment in France, Netherlands, Australia, Malaysia, South Africa, the US, or Singapore and this foreign training program was stopped by Government of India from 2019. OTs are also trained to apply theoretical concepts and acquire practical skills through the subjects of Procedure/Techniques of Investigation and Drafting of Orders and Reports, Information Technology and Operations, Management and Administration in the Income Tax department, International Taxation and Transfer Pricing, Law of Governance and Ethics, and Business Laws-II. A number of guest lectures are organized to familiarize the trainees with the best practices in tax administration.

Officer Trainees are also expected to complete a project on Direct Tax Provisions for the award of a master's degree in Business Law and Taxation from NALSAR University of Law, Hyderabad at the time of Valediction from NADT.

== Designations ==
The designations and time-scales within the Indian Revenue Service are as follows after cadre restructure:

Ranks, designations, and positions held by Indian Revenue Service (Income Tax) officers in their career
| Grade / Scale (Level on pay matrix) | Posting in Income Tax Department | Position in Government of India | Position in Order of precedence in India | Pay scale (Basic pay) |
|---|---|---|---|---|
| Administrative head (Pay level 17) | Chairperson of CBDT | Secretary | 23 (Note: CBDT chairman is the senior-most IRS(IT) officer and the administrative head of the Indian Revenue Service (Income Tax), and is equivalent to Secretary to the Government of India.) | ₹225,000 (US$2,400) |
| Apex scale (Pay level 17) | Member of CBDT Director of the Enforcement Directorate Principal Chief Commissioner of Income Tax (PCCIT) | Secretary Special Secretary | 23 | ₹225,000 (US$2,400) |
| Higher administrative grade + (Pay level 16) | Chief Commissioner of Income Tax (CCIT) Director General of Income Tax (DGIT) | Additional Secretary | 25 | ₹205,400 (US$2,200)—₹224,400 (US$2,400) |
| Higher administrative grade (Pay level 15) | Principal Commissioner / Director of Income Tax (PCIT / PDIT) | Additional Secretary | 25 | ₹182,200 (US$1,900)—₹224,100 (US$2,400) |
| Senior administrative grade (Pay level 14) | Commissioner of Income Tax (CIT) Additional Director General (ADG); Director of Income Tax (DIT) | Joint Secretary | 26 | ₹144,200 (US$1,500)—₹218,200 (US$2,300) |
| Selection grade (Pay level 13) | Additional Commissioner of Income Tax | Director | | ₹123,100 (US$1,300)—₹215,900 (US$2,300) |
| Junior administrative grade (Pay level 12) | Joint Commissioner / Director of Income Tax (JCIT / JDIT) | Deputy Secretary | | ₹78,800 (US$840)—₹209,200 (US$2,200) |
| Senior time scale (Pay level 11) | Deputy Commissioner / Director of Income Tax (DCIT / DDIT) | Under Secretary | | ₹67,700 (US$720)—₹208,700 (US$2,200) |
| Junior time scale (Pay level 10) | Assistant Commissioner / Director of Income Tax (ACIT / ADIT) Entry-level (Probationer) | Assistant Secretary | | ₹56,100 (US$600)—₹177,500 (US$1,900) |

== Major concerns ==
=== Corruption ===
In 2015, it was reported that as many as 108 IRS officers were under probe by the CBI for their alleged involvement in corruption. From May 2009 to May 2010, the CBI had sought sanction for prosecution of 102 IRS officials posted in different parts of the country in connection with corruption cases.

In 2016, the Ministry of Finance, dismissed 72 and prematurely retired another 33 Indian Revenue Service officers for non-performance and on disciplinary grounds.

The IRS officials top the Central Bureau of Investigation's list of most corrupt bureaucrats. In one case, a 1992 batch IRS officer was arrested for accepting a bribe of ₹2 crore in Mumbai. Recently, in another case, some IRS officials were found to help certain companies evade payment of Service tax and related penalties of the order of ₹1 crore. Also CBI raided premises of an income tax officer for demanding Bribe to the tune of ₹60 crore for covering up Stock Guru Scam.

=== Murder of many officers ===
Even though IRS officers have to deal with sensitive postings in their career they are not provided adequate security. Many IRS officers in the departments of customs and income tax have been assassinated in the course of their investigations.

=== Recent initiatives ===
IT Department is one of the most IT integrated governance systems in country today.This has reduced discretionary powers, corruption and has made the system efficient and responsive to the needs of the taxpayers. Refund Banker Scheme introduced in 2007, Introduction of E-filing of Taxes after 2009, effective implementation of Permanent Account Number (PAN), Centralized Processing Center setup in 2010 at Bangalore and subsequent e-processing of returns, e-assessments, faceless assessments etc. are some revolutionary steps pioneered by the department and service. These computerization initiatives have also helped service rationalize manpower and bring down cost of collection of revenue. The service also give lot of emphasis for tax payer services such as Income Tax Ombudsmen, Sevottam Scheme, Citizen Charter, Ayakar Seva Kendra (ASK), e- nivaran, Aaykar Sampark Kendra etc.

=== Career progression. ===
An IRS officer is also eligible to be selected as a member of the Income Tax Appellate Tribunal, Authority for Advance Ruling, Income Tax Settlement Commission/Interim Board for Settlement, and Income Tax Ombudsman as per the prescribed eligibility criteria.

However, the stagnation at middle levels due to slow promotion, and limited deputation and foreign assignments are very common in the service.

== See also ==
- Income Tax Department
- List of Income Tax Department officer ranks
- Civil Services of India
- All India Service
