= K. V. Chowdary =

Indian Revenue Service officer

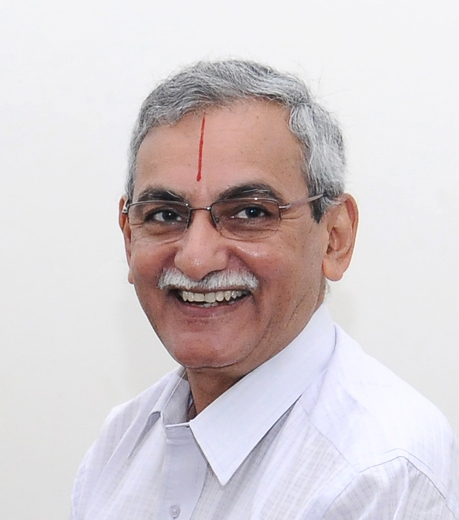
- Shri K. V. Chowdary, in New Delhi on 17 August 2017

Central Vigilance Commissioner of India
- In office 10 June 2015 – 9 June 2019
- Preceded by: Rajiv
- Succeeded by: Sharad Kumar

Chairman of Central Board of Direct Taxes
- In office 1 August 2014 – 31 October 2014
- Preceded by: R K Tewari
- Succeeded by: Anita Kapur

Personal details
- Born: 10 October 1954 (age 71) Kurumaddali, Krishna District, Andhra Pradesh, India

K. V. Chowdary (born 10 October 1954) is a retired officer of the 1978 batch of Indian Revenue Service (IRS). He was appointed Chairman of the Central Board of Direct Taxes (CBDT) on 10 June 2015 and served until 9 June 2019. He was appointed as a member of the board directors of Reliance Industries in October 2019.
