= List of Income Tax Department officer ranks =

The following are ranks of the officers working in the Income Tax Department of Ministry of Finance (India). Officers are appointed from two different recruiting agencies. Gazetted officers are appointed from Indian Revenue Service (Income Tax) of Union Public Service Commission while non-gazetted officers are recruited by Staff Selection Commission.

== Ranks of the Income Tax Department ==
	Position / pay grade in the Government of India	Level and rank according to section 116 of Income Tax 1961(2023)	Equivalent position or designation in Government of India	Order of precedence (as per presidential order)
11	Apex Scale	Chairman and Members of The Central Board Of Direct Taxes	Secretary	23
10	Apex Scale	Principal Directors-General of Income-Tax or Principal Chief Commissioner of Income-Tax	Special Secretary	23
9	Higher Administrative Grade +	Directors-General of Income-Tax or Chief Commissioner of Income-Tax	Additional Secretary (HAG+)	25
8	Higher Administrative Grade	Principal Directors of Income Tax or Principal Commissioners of Income Tax	Additional Secretary (HAG)	25
7	Senior Administrative Grade	Directors of Income-Tax or Commissioners of Income-Tax or Commissioners of Income-Tax(Appeals)	Joint Secretary	26
6	Selection Grade	Additional Directors of Income Tax or Additional Commissioners of Income Tax	Director
5	Junior Administrative Grade	Joint Directors of Income-Tax or Joint Commissioners of Income-Tax or Joint Commissioners of Income-Tax(Appeals)	Deputy Secretary
4	Senior Time Scale	Deputy Directors of Income-Tax or Deputy Commissioners of Income-tax	Under Secretary
3	Junior Time Scale	Assistant Directors of Income Tax / Assistant Commissioners of Income-Tax	Assistant Secretary
2		Income-Tax Officers / Tax Recovery Officers/Additional Assistant Directors	Section Officer
1		Inspectors of Income Tax/Tax Recovery Inspector	Assistant Section Officer

=== Alternative designations ===
- Deputy Commissioner of Income Tax – Deputy Director of Income Tax
- Assistant Commissioner of Income Tax – Assistant Director of Income Tax
- Assistant Commissioner of Income Tax (IRS Probationary Rank: 2 years of service)
- Assistant Commissioner of Income Tax (IRS Probationary Rank: 1 year of service)
