= Bandhu Mahto =

Indian politician (born 1934)

Member of Parliament, Rajya Sabha
- In office 1984–1990
- Constituency: Bihar

Personal details
- Born: 10 November 1934
- Party: Indian National Congress
- Spouse: Shila Devi

Bandhu Mahto (born 10 November 1934) is an Indian politician. He was a Member of Parliament, representing Bihar in the Rajya Sabha, the upper house of India's Parliament, representing the Indian National Congress.
