= Income Tax Department =

Central government agency in India

- आयकर विभाग
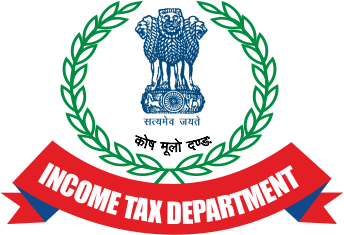
- Income Tax Department

Agency overview
- Formed: 1860; 166 years ago
- Jurisdiction: Government of the Republic of India
- Headquarters: North Block, Secretariat Building, New Delhi
- Motto: कोष मूलो दण्डः
- Employees: 46,000
- Minister responsible: Nirmala Sitharaman, Finance Minister
- Agency executive: Ravi Agrawal, IRS, Chairman, Central Board of Direct Taxes
- Parent department: Central Board of Direct Taxes, Ministry of Finance
- Website: incometaxindia.gov.in; incometax.gov.in

The Income Tax Department is a government of India agency responsible for collecting direct taxes. It functions under the Department of Revenue, Ministry of Finance, and is headed by the Central Board of Direct Taxes (CBDT). Its main responsibility is to administer direct tax laws, chiefly the Income-tax Act, 2025, which replaced the Income-tax Act, 1961, on 1 April 2026. It also enforces other economic laws such as the Benami Transactions (Prohibition) Act, 1988, and the Black Money Act, 2015.

The department levies tax on the income of individuals, firms, companies, local authorities, and other juridical persons, and handles international taxation, including double taxation avoidance agreements and transfer pricing. It also enforces measures against tax evasion, including the general anti-avoidance rule. The department has been criticised for a low conviction rate, high-pitched assessments and a large backlog of disputes, and has been accused of being used against critics of the ruling government.

== History ==
=== Ancient times ===
Ancient Indian texts discuss the king's right to levy taxes: the Manusmriti and the Baudhayana sutras describe taxation as a royal duty, with the latter citing a share of one-sixth of income in return of protection. Kautilya's Arthashastra, a treatise on economics, treated the treasury as the basis of state power. In Raghuvamsh, poet Kalidas eulogises King Dalip, stating, "it was only for the good of his subjects that he collected taxes from them just as the sun draws moisture from the earth to give it back a thousand times."

=== Colonial period ===
The 19th century saw the establishment of British rule in India. Following the mutiny of 1857, the British government faced an acute financial crisis. To fill up the treasury, the first Income-tax Act was introduced in February 1860 by James Wilson, who became British-India's first finance minister. The act received the assent of the governor general on 24 July 1860, and came into effect immediately. It was divided into 21 parts consisting of no less than 259 sections. Income was classified under four schedules: i) income from landed property; ii) income from professions and trade; iii) income from securities, annuities and dividends; and iv) income from salaries and pensions. Agricultural income was subject to tax.

Subsequently, many laws were brought to streamline income tax laws. For example, the Super-Rich Tax was introduced in 1918, and the new Income-tax Act was passed in 1918. But most important among all these were the Income-tax Act of 1922. This act of 1922 marked an important change from the act of 1918 by shifting the administration of the income tax from the hands of the provincial government to the central government. Another remarkable feature of this act was that the rates were to be enunciated by the annual finance acts instead of in the basic enactment. Again, the new Income-tax Act came in 1939.

=== Post-independence ===
The 1922 act was amended not less than twenty nine times between 1939 and 1956. A tax on capital gains was imposed for the first time in 1946, although the concept of ‘capital gains’ has been amended many times by later amendments. In 1956, Mr. Nicholas Kaldor was given the responsibility of investigating the Indian tax system in light of the revenue requirement of the second five-year plan (1956–1961). He submitted an exhaustive report for a coordinated tax system and therefore, the result was the enactment of several taxation acts, viz., the wealth-tax Act 1957, the Expenditure-tax Act, 1957 and the Gift-tax Act, 1958.

The Direct Taxes Administration Enquiry Committee, under the chairmanship of Shri Mahavir Tyagi, submitted its report on 30 November 1959, and the recommendations made therein took shape of the Income Tax Act, 1961. The 1961 act came in to force with effect from 1 April 1962 by replacing the Indian Income Tax Act, 1922, which had remained in operation for 40 years. The present law of income tax is governed by the Income Tax Act, 1961, which has 298 sections and four schedules and is applicable to whole of India, including the state of Jammu and Kashmir.

== Administration ==
Administration in the Income Tax Department (ITD) is run through a statutory body, the Central Board of Direct Taxes (CBDT), at the apex level and 18 territory-based regional headquarters at the field offices level. Besides these are 10 specialised directorates within the Income Tax Department, most extensive and famous among these being the Directorate of Investigation.

=== CBDT ===
The Central Board of Direct Taxes (CBDT) is a part of the Department of Revenue, Ministry of Finance. The CBDT provides inputs for the policy and planning of direct taxes in India and is also responsible for the administration of direct tax laws through the IT Department. The CBDT is a statutory authority functioning under the Central Board of Revenue Act, 1963. The officials of the Board in their ex officio capacity also function as a division of the ministry dealing with matters relating to the levy and collection of direct taxes. The CBDT is headed by a chairman and also comprises six members, all of whom are ex officio special secretaries to the government of India.

The chairman and members of the CBDT are selected from the Indian Revenue Service (IRS), whose members constitute the top management of the IT Department. The chairman and every member of CBDT are responsible for exercising supervisory control over specialised functional categories at field offices of the IT Department. Various functions and responsibilities of the CBDT are distributed amongst the chairman and six members, with only fundamental issues reserved for collective decision by the CBDT. The areas for collective decision by the CBDT include policy regarding discharge of statutory functions of the CBDT and of the Central government under the various direct tax laws.

=== Regional headquarters ===
At present Income Tax Department (ITD) field offices are divided into 18 regions with territorial jurisdiction and one region for international taxation. As required for efficient and effective administration, these regions have some administrative autonomy to carry out duties assigned by CBDT.

List of ITD regions
Serial No.	Region (headed by PrCCIT)	Sub-regions (headed by CCsIT)	Headquarter city
1	Gujarat	CCsIT, Ahmedabad-1, 2, TDS, Surat, Vadodara, Rajkot, DGIT (Inv.), Ahmedabad	Ahmedabad
2	Karnataka & Goa	CCsIT, Bengaluru-1 & 2, TDS, Panaji, DGIT (Inv.), Bengaluru	Bengaluru
3	Madhya Pradesh & Chhattisgarh	CCsIT, Raipur, Indore, DGIT (Inv.), Bhopal	Bhopal
4	Odisha	None	Bhubaneswar
5	North West Region	CCsIT Amritsar, Ludhiana, Shimla, Panchkula, DGIT (Inv.), Chandigarh	Chandigarh
6	Tamil Nadu & Puducherry	CCsIT, Chennai-1 to 4, TDS, Coimbatore, Madurai, Trichy, DGIT (Inv.), Chennai	Chennai
7	Delhi	CCsIT Delhi-1 to 9, TDS, Central, Exemptions, DsGIT (Inv.), Delhi, (Risk Assessment), (I&CI)	Delhi
8	North East Region	CCIT, Shillong	Guwahati
9	Andhra Pradesh & Telangana	CCsIT, Hyderabad, Vijayawada, Vishakhapatnam, DGIT (Inv.), Hyderabad	Hyderabad
10	Rajasthan	CCsIT, Jodhpur, Udaipur DGIT (Inv.), Jaipur	Jaipur
11	UP (West) & Uttarakhand	CCsIT, Ghaziabad, Dehradun	Kanpur
12	Kerala	CCsIT, Thiruvananthapuram, DGIT (Inv.), Kochi	Kochi
13	West Bengal & Sikkim	CCsIT, Kolkata-1 to 6, TDS, DGIT (Inv.), Kolkata	Kolkata
14	UP (East)	CCsIT, Allahabad, Bareilly, DGIT (Inv.), Lucknow	Lucknow
15	Mumbai	CCsIT, Mumbai-1 to 11, TDS, Central-1, 2, DGIT (Inv.), Mumbai,	Mumbai
16	Nagpur	None	Nagpur
17	Bihar & Jharkhand	CCIT, Ranchi, DGIT (Inv.), Patna	Patna
18	Pune	CCsIT, Pune, Thane, Nasik, DGIT (Inv.), Pune	Pune
19	International Taxation	CCsIT (International Taxation), Bengaluru, Mumbai	Delhi

=== Directorates ===
Directorates are meant to take responsibility of specialised functions. There are 10 specialised directorates within the Income Tax Department, most extensive and famous among these being Directorate of Investigation.

List of ITD directorates
Serial No.	Directorate	Head of directorate	Headquarter city
1	Investigation	18 Director Generals of Income Tax (DGsIT)	At respective regional headquarters
2	Systems	Principal Director General of Income Tax	New Delhi
3	Legal & Research	Principal Director General of Income Tax	New Delhi
4	Training	Principal Director General of Income Tax	NADT, Nagpur
5	Intelligence & Criminal Investigation (I&CI)	Director General of Income Tax	New Delhi
6	Vigilance	Principal Director General of Income Tax/CVO	New Delhi
7	Administration & Tax Payer Services (TPS)	Principal Director General of Income Tax	New Delhi
8	Logistics	Principal Director General of Income Tax	New Delhi
9	Human Resource Development (HRD)	Principal Director General of Income Tax	New Delhi
10	Risk Assessment	Director General of Income Tax	New Delhi

== Governance by ITD ==
The Income Tax Department of the Government of India is responsible for direct tax administration and interacts with a large portion of the population annually. ITD outlined steps to measure and raise citizen satisfaction in their 2011 strategic action plan. The Sevottam model of governance is being implemented by the Income Tax Department.

=== Sevottam ===
The Income Tax Department is a leader in implementing Sevottam, which is certification of quality of public service delivery in India. The term Sevottam comes from the Hindi words Seva and Uttam and supposedly means excellence in service delivery. It involves the identification of the services delivered to the citizens, quality of service, its objective, improvement of quality, by using innovative methods for developing business process and more informative with the help of information technology. The citizen-centric approach includes the following three components:

- Citizen Charter and Service Standards: Citizen's Charter is being published by ITD from time to time to lay down standards of service delivery to taxpayers.
- Public Grievances: Income Tax Department has used technology for easy registration and faster disposal of grievances. Various initiatives taken by ITD are: eNivaran lets taxpayers to directly lodge grievance with their concerned ITD officer; Aaykar Seva Kendra (ASK) acts at integrated grievance redressal centre; eSahyog allows replies through email to ITD officers on detection of errors in tax filings by taxpayers; and other portals like CPGRAMS.
- Service Delivery Enablers: This includes customer feedback, employee motivation and infrastructure. Income Tax Department (ITD) functions largely through computer systems and networks; and feedback of taxpayers is taken regularly through Pre-Budget Consultation and regular industry-ministry/department interactions, Outreach Programmes etc. Employee motivation is subjective but good public perception of ITD ensure high employee motivation.

=== Ayakar Seva Kendra (ASK) ===
Ayakar Seva Kendra (ASK; translated as Income Tax Help Centre) is an integrated model that provides single window system for registration of all applications including those or redressal of grievances as well as receipt of paper return. The assesses can approach ASK and pose all kinds of queries. ASK is available at almost all Income Tax Department offices across the country.

=== Tax Return Preparer Scheme ===
Launched in 2006 by the Income Tax Department, the Tax Return Preparer Scheme assists small and marginal taxpayers in preparing and filing their tax returns by creating a company of ‘Tax Return Preparers’. Tax Return Preparers are experts in income tax law and in filing of income tax returns. They can charge a maximum fee of Rs. 250, or sometimes nothing.

=== Simplified Income Tax Return Filing ===
Over the years income tax return filing has been made more simple, convenient, and smart through use of technology. This includes following:

- eFiling: eFiling of returns ensured that all returns can be submitted in submitted in digital form at dedicated e-filing website (https://incometaxindiaefiling.gov.in) without any need of submitting paper returns to Income Tax Department offices. This not only reduced grievances of taxpayers on account of errors in data entry but also made filing of return of income any-time, any-where, convenient exercise.
- SAHAJ and SUGAM: ITR-1 (SAHAJ) is simplified version of earlier lengthy and complex ITR-1, which is applicable to salaried employees, similarly ITR-4 (SUGAM) is simplified version of ITR-4, which is applicable to small businesses and professionals.
- eVerification: Use of Aadhar Card or Bank Account is made to ensure verification of ITR by taxpayers. It is user-friendly and removed of the hassle of sending the hard copy of the ITR-V form to CPC Centre at Bengaluru, Karnataka. Taxpayers have also reported that the process of e-verification shortens the time taken for processing of the return and issue of refund.
- Pre-filled ITR: As part of efforts to popularise the electronic mode of filing Income Tax Returns (ITRs), the CBDT is planning to provide "pre-filled" return forms to filers which will have an automatic upload of data on income and other vitals of a taxpayer.

== Law enforcement powers of ITD ==
Taxation law is not only very complex as it requires specialised knowledge and expertise to implement, but also it necessitates various kinds of deterrent actions to ensure compliance by taxpayers.

=== Assessment ===
Assessment is done to ensure correct estimation of total taxable income of an assessee (i.e. taxpayer) and it determines amount of tax to be payable by (or to be refunded to) assessee. Most income tax returns filed are processed by the Centralised Processing Center in Bengaluru on the basis of the information provided by the taxpayer. Such automatic processing of returns is called as "summary assessment" and is carried out in accordance with sub-section (1) of section 143 of the Income Tax Act, 1961.

1. When the Income Tax Department requires clarifications or supporting documents on a return filed by the taxpayer, the taxpayer is served a notice under sub-section (2) of section 143 of the Income Tax Act, 1961 to provide evidence in support of the return filed by the taxpayer.
2. When the Income Tax Department requires clarifications from the taxpayer on certain issues for a better assessment of the income of the taxpayer or requiring the taxpayer to file a return of income if he has not filed one already, a notice under sub-section (1) of section 142 is issued to the taxpayer.

After the notices mentioned in points (1) and (2) above are complied with, assessment is made under sub-section (3) of section 143.

When no compliance is received after the lapse of the time period provided by the assessing officer, assessment is made under section 144.

Such assessments are called "scrutiny assessments."

=== Penalties and Prosecutions ===
1. Penalties: These are financial punishments for non-compliance with any specific provision of the Income-tax Act, and include penalties for not complying with the notices of the assessing officer.
2. Prosecution: Certain actions of taxpayers, for example wilful evasion of tax, are considered as criminal offence by the Income-tax Act and hence these offences result in prosecution. Such offences are considered criminal because they are deemed to be offences perpetrated against the state, as against offences against a person, which results in a civil prosecution. A prosecution is a stricter action than a penalty, and while a penalty only is monetary in nature, a prosecution involves serving jail time for the offences.

=== Surveys ===
The department can survey any business premises during the time such place is open for business for physical verification of records and other valuables. Section 133A of the Income Tax Act 1961 provides the department to conduct surveys.

=== Search and Seizure ===
The department can search residential and business premises of any taxpayer to check records and valuables to ensure that no evasion of tax is taking place. Section 132 of the Income Tax Act, 1961 provides the department the power to conduct search and seizure.

Both the survey action and the search and seizure action are known in the general parlance as "raids."

== Recent law enforcement actions by ITD ==
=== Demonetization period ===
The finance ministry instructed all revenue intelligence agencies to join the crackdown on forex traders, hawala operators and jewellers besides tracking movement of demonetised currency notes.

Income Tax departments raided various illegal tax-evasive businesses in Delhi, Mumbai, Chandigarh, Ludhiana and other cities that traded with demonetised currency. The Enforcement Directorate issued several FEMA notices to forex and gold traders. Large sum of cash in defunct notes were seized in different parts of the country. In Chhattisgarh liquid cash worth of ₹4.4 million (US$46,000) was seized. In December 2016, the Income Tax department received more than 4000 emails, on black money holders, in India, within 3 days, when Income Tax Department, issued in public notice an email to report black money.

Huge amounts of cash in the form of new notes were seized all over the country after the demonetisation.

In December 2016, over ₹4 crore in new ₹2000 notes were seized from four persons in Bangalore, ₹33 lakh in ₹2000 notes were recovered from Manish Sharma, an expelled BJP leader in West Bengal, and ₹1.5 crore was seized in Goa. 900 notes of the new ₹2000 denomination were seized from a BJP leader in Tamil Nadu. Around ₹10 crore in new ₹2000 notes were seized in Chennai.

As of 10 December 2016, new notes worth ₹2.42 billion were seized by the Income Tax Department.

=== Raids on unrecognised political parties ===
The Income Tax department conducted raids and surveys in various states in separate cases related to alleged tax evasion, violation of FCRA violation and illicit funding of registered unrecognised political parties.

== Criticism ==
Government data show that the IT Department has a low conviction rate. Between 2021–22 and 2025–26, the department filed 2,127 cases. Of the 1,087 cases concluded, only 233 (21.43%) resulted in a conviction. Critics have described the department's practices as "tax-terrorism", a term coined by Arun Jaitley in 2014 to describe tax administration under the previous United Progressive Alliance-II government. An investment advisor in 2018 noted that the practice continued under Jaitley as finance minister, citing inflated demands and the requirement to pay 20% of the disputed amount before filing an appeal. Other commentators have argued that unrealistic revenue targets and discretion produce high-pitched assessments, citing the Comptroller and Auditor General's finding that the department lost 65% of cases.

At the end of 2024–25, 5.39 lakh appeals involving ₹16.75 lakh crore (equivalent to ₹17 trillion or US$180 billion in 2026) were pending before the first appellate authority. The government has initiated faceless assessments and appeals, and has announced vivad se vishwas (from disputes to trust) schemes to settle cases. The department has allegedly been used to target people and organisations critical of the government, including media outlets. In one instance, after reports of 11 raids on opposition politicians, the department refused to provide information regarding the one-sided raids, prompting N. Chandrababu Naidu to label the department as "the BJP branch office."

== See also ==
- Central Excise (India)
- Indian Revenue Service (Income Tax)
- List of Income Tax Department officer ranks
- Central budget of India
