= Daya Shankar (civil servant) =

Indian Revenue Service officer

Daya Shankar (1952–2012) was an officer of the Indian Revenue Service who served in the Indian Customs and erstwhile Central Excise Department in Mumbai, Goa & Daman. He was from Patna, Bihar. He was known for his crackdown on gold smuggling networks in Daman, Goa and Mumbai. Shankar's most famous crackdown was on Dawood Ibrahim. He arrested Dawood Ibrahim's brother Anees in a smuggling case.
