= Sevottam =

Sevottam is an administrative measure to improve the quality of public services in India. The term Sevottam comes from the Hindi words "Seva" and "Uttam" and means excellence in service delivery. The citizen-centric approach includes the following components:

- Citizen Charter and Service Standards - Citizen Charter is the document where a public sector organization declares its key services along with delivery timelines and requirements.
- Public Grievances - the receipt, redressal and prevention of grievances.
- Service Delivery Enablers - This includes customer feedback, employee motivation and infrastructure.

The Department of Administrative Reforms and Public Grievances has developed a model for benchmarking Excellence in Public Service Delivery through Sevottam. The model provides the frame work to organizations to assess and improve the quality of service delivery for the citizens. It involves the identification of the services delivered to the citizens, quality of service, its objective, improvement of quality, by using innovative methods for developing business process and more informative with the help of information technology. The CBDT and Central Board of Excise and Customs are the biggest departments where this is undertaken. The project is supported by the United Progressive Alliance.
