= Chairperson of the Central Board of Direct Taxes =

Indian civil servant

Central Board of Direct Taxes
- केंद्रीय प्रत्यक्ष कर बोर्ड
- Emblem of The Government of India

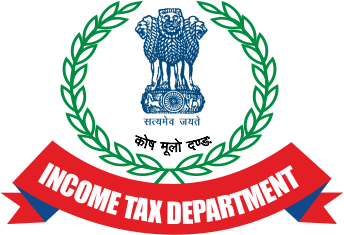
- Incumbent; Ravi Agarwal, IRS (IT:1988) since 1 July 2024
- Income Tax Department (IT)
- Status: Active
- Abbreviation: CBDT
- Reports to: Government of India
- Residence: North Block, Secretariat Building, New Delhi
- Appointer: Finance minister of India; The appointee for the office is approved by Appointments Committee of the Cabinet headed by Prime Minister (Note: The CBDT Chairperson is usually the senior most IRS officer of the senior most batch.)
- Term length: No fixed tenure is imposed on the office but term can be extended
- Inaugural holder: Jamuna Prasad Singh
- Formation: 1964
- Salary: ₹225,000 (US$2,300)
- Website: https://www.irsofficersonline.gov.in/

The Chairperson, Central Board of Direct Taxes (CBDT) is the senior-most IRS (IT) civil servant in the Government of India. The Chairperson of Central Board of Direct Taxes (CBDT) is the Special Secretary to the Government of India and also cadre controlling authority of the Indian Revenue Service (Income Tax).

The CBDT Chairperson is a Special Secretary and reports to the Revenue Secretary of India. He is placed equivalent to officers of the rank of Lieutenant-General, Vice-Admiral or Air Marshal, CBI Director and Deputy Comptroller and Auditor General in the Order of Precedence.

== Functions ==
The following are the functions of the Chairman:

- Administrative planning of the Income Tax Department.
- Act as advisor and conscience keeper of the Indian Revenue Service.
- Handle senior appointments.
- Represents the Finance Ministry at important tax-based conferences at UN and OECD.
- Transfers and postings of officers in the cadre of Chief Commissioner of Income-tax and Commissioner of Income-tax.
- Matters dealt with in the Foreign Tax and Tax Research Division, except matters under Section 80-O of the Income-tax Act, 1961.
- Ensure that the Cabinet decisions are implemented
- Advise the Finance Minister of India.
- All matters relating to Central and Regional Direct Taxes Advisory Committees and Consultative Committee of the Parliament.
- Public Grievances.
- Provide an element of continuity and stability to administration during crises.

== Emolument, accommodation and perquisites ==
As the Chairperson, CBDT is of the rank of Secretary to Government of India, his/her salary is equivalent to Chief Secretaries of State Governments and to Vice Chief of Army Staff/Commanders, in the rank of Lieutenant General and equivalent ranks in Indian Armed Forces.

Chairperson, CBDT monthly pay and allowances
Base Salary as per 7th Pay Commission (Per month)	Pay Matrix Level	Sources
₹225,000 (US$2,300)	Pay Level 17	

== List of CBDT Chairpersons ==
CBDT Chairpersons since Inception
Name	Tenure	Notes
Jamuna Prasad Singh	1964 - 1967	First ever CBDT Chairman
S A I Navapna Raw	1967 - 1968	
K S Sundara Rajan	1968 - 1969	Went on to become Special Secretary, Cabinet Secretariat
R N Muttoo	1969 - 1971	
R D Shah	1971 - 1974	
S R Mehta	1974 - 1977	
S Narayan	1977 - 1978	
V V Badami	1978 - 1979	
O V Kuravilla	1979 - 1981	Went on to become Chairman of Kerala State Electricity Regulatory Commission
Jagdish Chand	1981 - 1983	
V Chidambaram	1983 - 1984	
N Subramanian	1984 - 1985	
M S Narayanan	1985 - 1986	
Chand K. Tikku	1986 - 1988	Went on to become Vice Chairman of MP Administrative Reforms Commission
G N Gupta	1988 - 1989	
A S Thind	1989 - 1989	
T N Pandey	1989 - 1990	Went on to become Member of Direct Tax Reforms Committee
A V Swaminathan	1990 - 1991	
A K Ghosh	1991 - 1992	Was appointed as Chairman of Supreme Fact-Finding Committee related to Harshad Mehta Scam
S Ramamurthi	1992 - 1993	
R S Rathore	1993 - 1994	
Dr. N R Sivaswamy	1994 - 1994	
T S Srinivasan	1994 - 1995	
N Rangachary	1995 - 1996	Went on to become Chairman of the IRDA
G K Mishra	1996 - 1997	
S N Shende	1997 - 1997	
Ravi Kant	1997 - 2000	
S K Nigam	2000 - 2000	First woman to be a CBDT Chairperson. Was appointed as Special Advisor to FM on Taxation
A Balasubramanian	2000 - 2001	
O P Srivastava	2001 - 2001	
P K Sharma	2002 - 2003	
P L Singh	2003 - 2004	
Shobha Majumdar	2004 - 2005	Second woman to be a CBDT Chairperson
Berjinder Singh	2005 - 2005	
M S Darda	2005 - 2005	
M M Kherawala	2006 - 2006	Third woman to be a CBDT Chairperson
Indira Bhargawa	2006 - 2007	Fourth woman to be a CBDT Chairperson
B M Singh	2007 - 2007	Went on to become Member of ITSC
R Prasad	2007 - 2008	Went to become Member of Competition Commission of India (CCI) till 2013
P K Mishra	2008 - 2008	Went on to become Chairperson, Adjudicating Authority, Prevention of Money Laundering (PMLA), Ministry of Finance till 2013
R S Mathoda	2008 - 2008	
N B Singh	2008 - 2009	
S S N Moorthy	2009 - 2010	Went on to become Member of Securities Appellate Tribunal
Sudhir Chandra	2011 - 2011	
Prakash Chandra	2011 - 2011	
M C Joshi	2011 - 2012	Was Chairman of Black Money Committee appointed by Prime Minister
Laxman Das	2012 - 2012	
Poonam K Saxena	2012 - 2013	Fifth woman to be a CBDT Chairperson
Sudha Sharma	2013 - 2014	Sixth woman to be a CBDT Chairperson
R K Tewari	2014 - 2014	
K. V. Chowdary	1 August 2014 – 31 October 2014	Went on to become CVC
Anita Kapur	1 November 2014 - 30 November 2015	Seventh woman to be a CBDT Chairperson. Went on to become member of Competition Appellate Tribunal
Arun Kumar Jain	15 Dec 2015 - 30 January 2016	
Atulesh Jindal	1 February 2016 - 31 July 2016	
Rani Singh Nair	1 August 2016 - 31 October 2016	Eighth woman to be a CBDT Chairperson
Sushil Chandra	1 November 2016- 14 February 2019	Went on to become Chief Election Commissioner at ECI
Pramod Chandra Mody	15 February 2019- 31 May 2021	Became Secretary General of Rajya Sabha in the rank of Cabinet Secretary
Jagannath Bidyadhar Mahapatra	1 June 2021 – 30 April 2022	From 1 June 2021 to August 2021, he served as the Acting Chairperson
Sangeeta Singh (additional charge)	2 May 2022 – 30 June 2022	
Nitin Gupta	1 July 2022 – 30 June 2024	Later Chairman National Financial Reporting Authority.
Ravi Agarwal	1 July 2024-Incumbent	Longest Serving Chairman

== See also ==
- Principal Secretary (India)
- Chairperson Central Board of Excise & Customs
