= Chief Commissioner of Income Tax =

Indian Government official

Chief Commissioner of Income Tax of Government of India
- Emblem of India
- Appointer: Finance Minister of India
- Formation: 1944
- Salary: ₹200,000 (US$2,100)
- Website: Official website

The Chief Commissioner of Income Tax, or Director General of Income Tax is a senior rank in the Income Tax Department in India.

== Appointment ==
They are chosen from the Indian Revenue Service and typically serve the government for a period of 30 years or till they reach the age of superannuation. After cadre restructuring, a new designation is created. the Principal Chief Commissioner of Income Tax and senior-most Chief Commissioners of Income Tax are promoted into this grade and have additional responsibilities as per personnel and budgetary targets are concerned. Their equivalent rank at the Union Secretariat is that of a Special Secretary.

== Duties ==
Chief Commissioners are in charge of operations of the department within a region, which is usually overlapping with the territory of a state. Depending on the region, their numbers vary from 16 (in Maharashtra) to 3 (in Karnataka). Chief Commissioners are allotted budgetary targets for collection by the Central Board of Direct Taxes and the targets are divided among the Commissioners of Income Tax and are constantly monitored.

== See also ==
- Indian Revenue Service
- Departmental Directory
