= Direct tax =

Tax paid directly to the government by the person on whom it is imposed

Although the actual definitions vary between jurisdictions, in general, a direct tax is a tax imposed upon a person or property as distinct from a tax imposed upon a transaction, which is described as an indirect tax. There is a distinction between direct and indirect taxes depending on whether the tax is paid by the actual taxpayer or if the amount of tax is supported by a third party, usually a client. The term may be used in economic and political analyses, and may have legal implications in some jurisdictions.

In the United States of America, the term has special constitutional significance because of two provisions in the U.S. Constitution that any direct taxes imposed by the federal government must be apportioned among the states on the basis of population.

It is also significant in the European Union, where direct taxation remains the sole responsibility of member states.

The concept of a direct tax also has constitutional significance in Canada. Under the Constitution Act, 1867, the federal Parliament can impose any type of tax, whether direct or indirect. However, the provinces are only authorised to impose direct taxes. There has been considerable litigation over the scope of the provincial direct tax power.

== General meaning ==
In general, a direct tax is one imposed upon an individual person (juristic or natural) or property (i.e. real and personal property, livestock, crops, wages, etc.) as distinct from a tax imposed upon a transaction. In this sense, indirect taxes such as a sales tax or a value added tax (VAT) are imposed only if and when a taxable transaction occurs. People have the freedom to engage in or refrain from such transactions; whereas a direct tax (in the general sense) is imposed upon a person, typically in an unconditional manner, such as a poll-tax or head-tax, which is imposed on the basis of the person's very life or existence, or a property tax which is imposed upon the owner by virtue of ownership, rather than commercial use. Some commentators have argued that the distinction rests on whether the burden of taxation can be shifted from one legal person to another.

Direct taxes are thought to be borne and paid by the same person. The person who pays the amount of direct tax does not recover all or part of the tax elsewhere. It is in this sense that direct taxation is opposed to indirect taxation. It is the notion of fiscal incidence which allows to analyse who ultimately, weights the burden of a tax, that determines whether the tax is direct or indirect. Direct taxation is generally declarative (established either by the person concerned or by a third party).

The unconditional, inexorable aspect of the direct tax was a paramount concern of people in the 18th century seeking to escape tyrannical forms of government and to safeguard individual liberty.

In The Wealth of Nations, Adam Smith was the first to extensively discuss in English the distinction between direct and indirect taxation by those names, as in the following passage (Note: While Sir James Steuart's An Inquiry into the Principles of Political Œconomy predated Smith's work by nearly a decade, Steuart's discussion of direct and indirect taxation occurred under the alternative categorical names of cumulative and proportional taxation, respectively; Steuart also discussed a nonmonetary form of taxation which he denoted "personal", which involved compelled individual service (e.g., militia or military service, jury duty, etc.). The likely first use of the concept of direct taxation was in Mirabeau's Théorie de l'Impôt in 1760.):

It is thus that a tax upon the necessaries of life operates exactly in the same manner as a direct tax upon the wages of labour. ... if he is a manufacturer, will charge upon the price of his goods this rise of wages, together with a profit; so that the final payment of the tax, together with this overcharge, will fall upon the consumer.

Justice William Paterson quotes Smith approvingly, noting that indirect taxes are "circuitous modes of reaching the revenue of individuals," which implies that direct taxes are those which are not circuitous. (Note: Whatever this precisely means, however, is unclear. Nonetheless, "the distinction was widely understood among the founding generation" of the United States. Natelson, Robert (2015). "What the Constitution Means by "Duties, Imposts, and Excises"—and "Taxes" (Direct or Otherwise)". Case Western Reserve University Law Review. 66 (2): 297.)

The Pennsylvania Minority, a group of delegates to the 1787 U.S. Constitutional Convention who dissented from the document sent to the states for ratification, objected over this kind of taxation, and explained:

The power of direct taxation applies to every individual ... it cannot be evaded like the objects of imposts or excise, and will be paid, because all that a man hath will he give for his head. This tax is so congenial to the nature of despotism, that it has ever been a favorite under such governments. ... The power of direct taxation will further apply to every individual ... however oppressive, the people will have but this alternative, either to pay the tax, or let their property be taken for all resistance will be vain.

== Examples of direct taxes ==
Direct taxation can apply on income or on wealth (property tax; estate tax or wealth tax). Here below a few examples of direct taxes existing in the United States (though not all of these meet the US constitutional definition of a direct tax, as stated below):

- Income tax: it is the most important direct tax in many developed countries. It is based on incomes of taxpayers. A certain amount of money is taken from the wage of the individuals. When this type of tax is applied to corporations and firms, it is called corporate income tax.
- Transfer taxes: the most frequent form of transfer taxes is the estate tax. Such a tax is levied on the taxable portion of the property of a deceased individual. A gift tax is also another form of transfer taxes when a certain amount is collected from people who are transferring properties to another individual.
- Entitlement tax or payroll taxes: this type of direct tax serves to finance social security and health services. The entitlement tax is collected through payroll deductions. Their importance increases with the rise of the development of the welfare state during the twentieth century.
- Property tax: property tax is charged on properties such as land and buildings.
- Capital gains tax: this tax is collected when an individual earns gains from the sale of capital, for example when an individual sells stocks, real estate, or a business. The tax is computed by determining the difference between the acquisition amount and the selling amount.

== Effects of direct taxation and comparison of indirect taxation ==
Direct taxation has a few advantages and also some inconveniences in comparison of indirect taxes. It promotes equality and equity because direct taxes are based on ability to pay of the taxpayer and in the case of a progressive tax structure, every person is taxed differently depending on their income. Another advantage of direct taxation is that the government and the taxpayer know the amount they will receive and they pay, even before the collection of the tax. Direct taxation and in particular income tax act as automatic stabilizers. Some direct taxes are easy to collect for the government and the fiscal administration because they are collected at the source. Yet, tax collection can be expensive depending on the efficiency of the fiscal administration. Running the tax collection office has some administrative costs (keeping the records of incomes of the population for example), in particular when different tax rates are applied. Moreover, direct taxes can be evaded (tax evasion affects mainly direct taxes) whereas indirect taxes cannot be evaded (when the taxed transaction occurs, it is not possible to avoid the burden of the tax).

Direct taxes decrease the savings and earnings of individuals and firms. Indirect taxation however make goods and services more expensive (the burden of the tax is reflected in the prices). Contrary to indirect taxation which leads to inflation (increasing of the prices), direct taxes can help to reduce inflation.

There is no consensus among the academic literature to designate if direct taxation is more efficient or not. Earlier works based on static models favour direct taxation whereas the recent literature, based on neoclassical growth models, shows that indirect taxation is more efficient. The conclusions of these debates are that the answers are mostly conjectural, depending on the economic structure.

== Direct taxes and progressivity ==
Contrary to indirect taxes such as value-added taxes, direct taxes can be adjusted to the ability to pay of the taxpayer according to their status (income, age...). So, direct taxes can be progressive (the tax rate increases as the taxable amount increases), proportional (the tax rate is fixed, it does not change when the taxable base amount increases or decreases) or regressive (the tax rate decreases as the taxable amount increases) according to their structure. It differs from indirect taxes which are generally regressive because everyone pays the same amount regardless of ability to pay (meaning the burden of the tax is greater for the poorer than for the richer).

Moreover, direct taxation are transfers which can have a redistributive preoccupation (combined with the will of increasing tax revenue). Indeed, taxation is a main tool of the redistributive function of the government identified by Richard Musgrave in his The Theory of Public Finance (1959). A progressive direct taxation could participate in the reduction of inequalities and correcting difference in living standards among the population.

Another effect of a progressive direct taxation is that such tax structure act as automatic stabilizers when prices are stable. Indeed, when incomes (in the example of a progressive income tax) decrease, as a result of recession, the average tax rate is reduced – individuals have to face lower tax rates because their earnings and their incomes have been reduced. And similarly, when incomes are increasing, the average tax rate increases also. This mechanism of progressive taxation participates to the stabilization of the economy, another function of the government in the works of Musgrave (stabilization branch of the government which prevents major fluctuations in real GDP). When incomes fall, tax revenues fall too (and in the case of progressive taxation, even tax rates drop also) reducing tax burden on taxpayers.

== U.S. constitutional law ==
In the United States, the term "direct tax" has acquired specific meaning under constitutional law: a direct tax includes taxes on property by reason of ownership (such as an ordinary real estate property tax imposed on the person owning the property as of January 1 of each year) as well as capitations. Income taxes on income from personal services such as wages are indirect taxes in this sense. (Note: Nonetheless, Adam Smith appears to have considered taxes on "revenue" to have been direct, explaining the advent of indirect taxation as a result of "the state not knowing how to tax, directly and proportionably, the revenue of its subjects." Moreover, Justice William Paterson quotes this passage approvingly.) The United States Court of Appeals for the District of Columbia Circuit has stated: "Only three taxes are definitely known to be direct: (1) a capitation [...], (2) a tax upon real property, and (3) a tax upon personal property." In National Federation of Independent Business v. Sebelius, the Supreme Court held that the ObamaCare penalty imposed upon individuals for failure to possess health insurance, though a tax for constitutional purposes, is not a direct tax, reasoning that the tax is neither a tax on property, nor a capitation in that "it is triggered by specific circumstances" rather than levied "'without regard to property, profession, or any other circumstance.'"

In the United States, the Constitution requires that direct taxes imposed by the national government be apportioned among the states on the basis of population. After the 1895 Pollock ruling that taxes on income from property should be treated as direct taxes, this provision made it difficult for Congress to impose a national income tax that applied to all forms of income until the Sixteenth Amendment was ratified in 1913. Since then, Federal income taxes have been subject to the rule of uniformity but not the rule of apportionment. Before then, the principal sources of revenue for the federal government were excise taxes and customs duties. Their importance thus decreased during the twentieth century and the main federal government's resources have become individual income taxes and payroll taxes. Other evolutions were observed at the local and state level with a decrease of importance of property taxes whereas income and sale taxes became more important.

In the context of income taxes on wages, salaries and other forms of compensation for personal services, see, e.g., United States v. Connor, 898 F.2d 942, 90-1 U.S. Tax Cas. (CCH) paragr. 50,166 (3d Cir. 1990) (tax evasion conviction under 26 U.S.C. § 7201 affirmed by the United States Court of Appeals for the Third Circuit; taxpayer's argument—that because of the Sixteenth Amendment, wages were not taxable—was rejected by the Court; taxpayer's argument that an income tax on wages is required to be apportioned by population also rejected); Perkins v. Commissioner, 746 F.2d 1187, 84-2 U.S. Tax Cas. (CCH) paragr. 9898 (6th Cir. 1984) (26 U.S.C. § 61 ruled by the United States Court of Appeals for the Sixth Circuit to be "in full accordance with Congressional authority under the Sixteenth Amendment to the Constitution to impose taxes on income without apportionment among the states"; taxpayer's argument that wages paid for labor are non-taxable was rejected by the Court, and ruled frivolous).

== Direct taxation in India ==
Direct tax is a form of collecting taxes applicable on the general public by the means of their personal income and wealth generated and collected through formal channels and worthy government credentials such as Permanent account number and bank account details.

Section 2(c) of the Central Boards of Revenue Act, 1963 of India defines "direct tax" as follows:

(1) any duty leviable (or) tax chargeable under-

- (i) the Estate Duty Act, 1953 (34 of 1953.);
- (ii) the Wealth-tax Act, 1957 (27 of 1957.);
- (iii) the Expenditure-tax Act, 1957 (29 of 1957.);
- (iv) the Gift-tax Act, 1958 (18 of 1958.);
- (v) the Income-tax Act, 1961 (43 of 1961.)
- (vi) the Super Profits Tax Act, 1963 (14 of 1963.); and
(2) any other duty or tax which, having regard to its nature or incidence, may be declared by the Central Government, by notification in the Official Gazette, to be a direct tax.

== Direct taxation in other countries ==
General government revenue, in % of GDP, from direct taxes. For this data, the variance of GDP per capita with purchasing power parity (PPP) is explained in 43% by tax revenue.

Tax policy in the European Union (EU) consists of two components: direct taxation, which remains the sole responsibility of member states, and indirect taxation, which affects free movement of goods and the freedom to provide services. With regard to European Union direct taxes, Member States have taken measures to prevent tax avoidance and double taxation. EU direct taxation covers, regarding companies, the following policies: the common consolidated corporate tax base, the common system of taxation applicable in the case of parent companies and subsidiaries of different member states (to avoid withholding tax when the dividend qualifies for application of the EC Parent-Subsidiary Directive, the financial transaction tax, interest and royalty payments made between associated companies and elimination of double taxation if the payment qualifies for application of the EC Interest and Royalties Directive. Regarding direct taxation for individuals, the policies cover taxation of savings income, dividend taxation of individuals and tackling tax obstacles to the cross-border provision of occupational pensions.

== See also ==
- Income tax in the United States

== Sources ==
- Foster, Robert (1895). Commentaries on the Constitution of the United States: Historical and Judicial. Vol. 1. Boston: The Boston Book Co. pp. 415–423.
- Joseph E. Stiglitz, Economics of the public sector (third edition), 2000, New York, Norton & Company. pp. 455-466
