= Central Board of Direct Taxes =

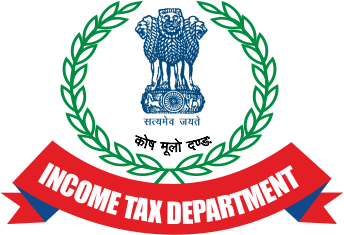
- Central Board of Direct Tax Logo
- Abbreviation: CBDT
- Motto: कोष मूलों दंड: Fund roots and bars

Agency overview
- Formed: 1 January 1964; 62 years ago
- Preceding agency: Central Board of Revenue
- Legal personality: Statutory body

Jurisdictional structure
- National agency (Operations jurisdiction): IND
- Operations jurisdiction: IND
- Income Tax Department India
- Legal jurisdiction: India
- Governing body: Government of India
- Constituting instrument: Central Board of Revenue Act, 1963

Operational structure
- Headquarters: New Delhi, India
- Minister of Finance responsible: Nirmala Sitharaman, Ministry of Finance
- Agency executive: Ravi Agarwal, IRS, Chairperson
- Parent agency: Department of Revenue
- Child agency: Income Tax Department

Website
- https://www.irsofficersonline.gov.in/

The Central Board of Direct Taxes (CBDT) is a statutory body under the Department of Revenue, Ministry of Finance, Government of India. It oversees the administration of direct taxes, including income tax and corporate tax, through the Income Tax Department. The CBDT was constituted in 1964 under the Central Board of Revenue Act, 1963. The counterpart for indirect taxes is the Central Board of Indirect Taxes and Customs (CBIC).

CBDT is currently headed by Ravi Agarwal, the Chairperson of the Central Board of Direct Taxes.

== History ==
The Central Board of Revenue, the apex body of the Department entrusted with the administration of taxes, was established under the Central Board of Revenue Act, 1924. It was initially responsible for both direct and indirect taxes. However, on 1 January 1964, the Board was bifurcated into two separate entities: the Central Board of Direct Taxes (CBDT) and the Central Board of Excise and Customs (CBEC). This division was formalised through the constitution of the two Boards under Section 3 of the Central Board of Revenue Act, 1963.

== Associated bodies ==
- Income Tax Department
- Investigation Division of the Central Board of Direct Taxes
- Directorate General of Income Tax Investigation
- Chief Commissioner of Income Tax Central
