= Premiership of Morarji Desai =

Period of the Indian government from 1977 to 1979

Morarji Desai ministry
- 9th Ministry of the Republic of India

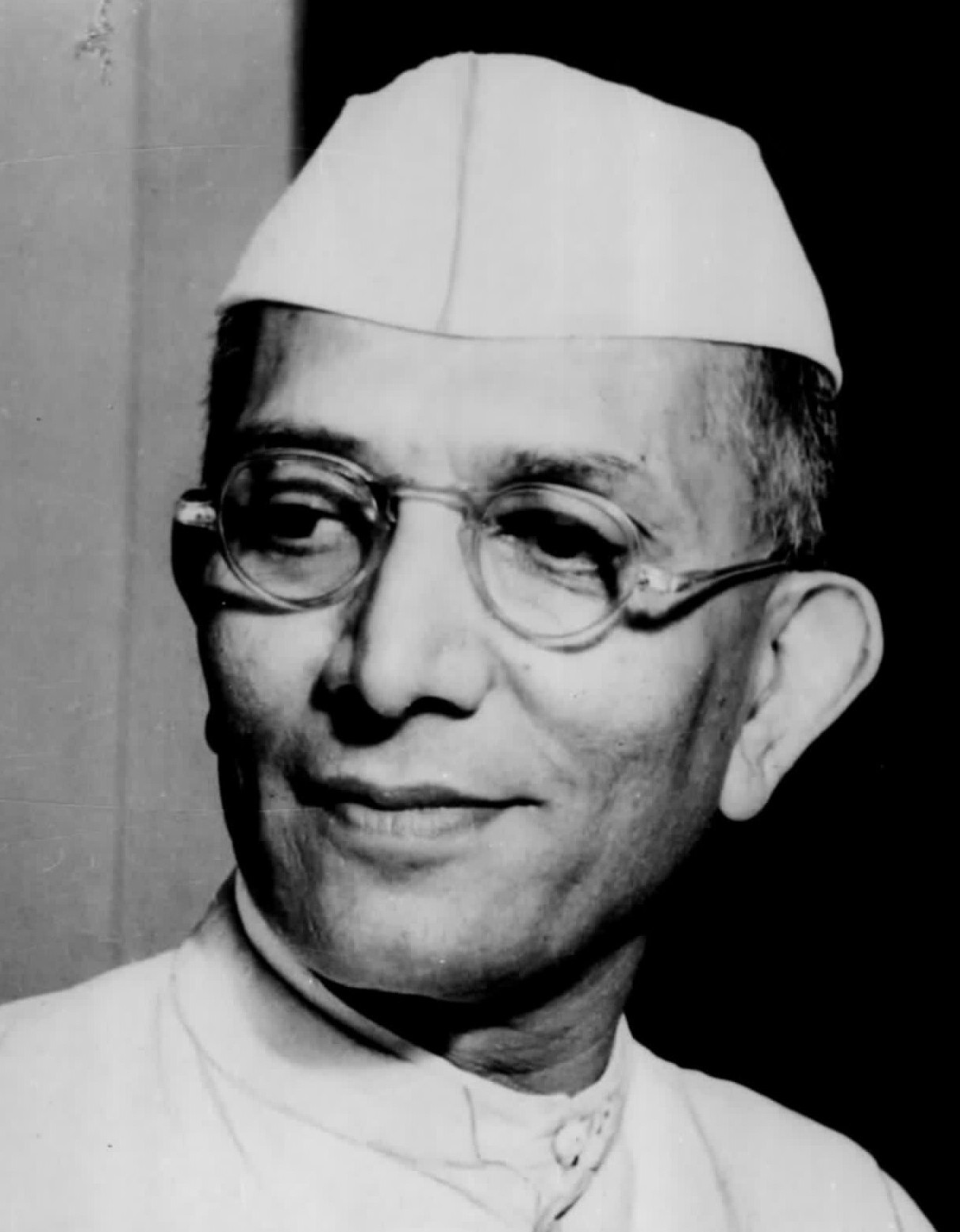
- Date formed: 24 March 1977
- Date dissolved: 28 July 1979

People and organisations
- Head of state: Basappa Danappa Jatti (Acting) (until 25 July 1977); Neelam Sanjiva Reddy (from 25 July 1977)
- Head of government: Morarji Desai
- Member party: Janata Party (Janata alliance)
- Status in legislature: Majority 295 / 542 (54%)
- Opposition party: Indian National Congress (Congress Alliance)
- Opposition leader: Yashwantrao Chavan (1 July 1977 – 11 April 1978; from 10 July 1979); C. M. Stephen (12 April 1978 – 9 July 1979) (Lok Sabha)

History
- Election: 1977
- Outgoing election: 1980
- Legislature terms: 2 years, 4 months and 4 days
- Predecessor: Third Indira Gandhi ministry
- Successor: Charan Singh ministry

The premiership of Morarji Desai lasted from 24 March 1977 to 15 July 1979, following the Janata Party's victory in the 1977 Indian general election against the Congress party. Upon taking office, Morarji Desai became the first Indian Prime Minister not belonging to the Congress party.

== Emergency and election victory ==
The Janata Party was formed by political leaders and activists of various political parties who had been united in opposing the state of emergency imposed in 1975 by then-Prime Minister Indira Gandhi. After elections were called in 1977, the Janata Party was formed from the union of the Congress (O), Swatantra Party, Socialist Party of India, Bharatiya Jana Sangh and the Lok Dal. Congress defector Jagjivan Ram, Hemvati Nandan Bahuguna & Nandini Satpathy formed the Congress for Democracy and joined the Janata alliance. The widespread unpopularity of the Emergency rule helped Janata and its allies win a landslide victory in the election.

== Reversal of Emergency decrees ==
The first actions taken by the Desai government were to formally end the state of emergency and media censorship and repeal the controversial executive decrees issued during the Emergency. In addition, the Constitution was amended to make it more difficult for any future government to declare a state of emergency, while fundamental freedoms and the independence of India's judiciary were reaffirmed. The new government also withdrew all charges against the 25 accused in the Baroda dynamite case, which included the new Minister of Industry, George Fernandes. The Minister of Railways reinstated the railway employees disciplined after the May 1974 strike.

The Desai government proceeded to establish inquiry commissions and tribunals to investigate allegations of corruption and human rights abuses by members of Indira Gandhi's government, political party and the police forces. Specific inquiries were instituted on Sanjay Gandhi's management of the state-owned Maruti Udyog Ltd., the activities of the former Minister of Defence Bansi Lal and the 1971 Nagarwala scandal. Both Indira and her son Sanjay were charged with allegations of corruption and briefly arrested.

== Economic policy ==
The Janata government had lesser success in achieving economic reforms. It launched the Sixth Five-Year Plan, aiming to boost agricultural production and rural industries. Seeking to promote economic self-reliance and indigenous industries, the government required multi-national corporations to go into partnership with Indian corporations. The policy proved controversial, diminishing foreign investment and led to the high-profile exit of corporations such as Coca-Cola and IBM from India. But the government was unable to address the issues of resurging inflation, fuel shortages, unemployment and poverty. The legalisation of strikes and re-empowerment of trade unions affected business efficiency and economic production.

The Janata government tried to curb forgery and black money in India by demonetising notes of 1000, 5000 and 10000 Rupees on 16 January 1978.
