= Landlord–tenant law in Tamil Nadu =

Landlord–tenant law in Tamil Nadu is the law governing the legal relationship or jural relationship that exists between the landlord and tenant as long as the valid tenancy continues between them with regard to the demised premises. The principal landlord–tenant statute in Tamil Nadu is The Tamil Nadu Buildings (Lease and Rent Control) Act, 1960 [Tamil Nadu Act No. XVIII of 1960].

== Definitions ==
The term Landlord with reference to the Tamil Nadu Buildings (Lease and Rent Control) Act, 1960 under Section 2(6) which runs as follows:

Sec.2(6) landlord includes the person who is receiving or is entitled to receive the rent of a building, whether on his own account or on behalf of another or on behalf of himself and others or as an agent, trustee, executor, administrator, receiver or guardian or who would so receive the rent to be entitled to receive the rent, if the building were let to a tenant:
Explanation: A tenant who sub-let shall be deemed to be a landlord within the meaning of this Act in relation to the sub-tenant.

Likewise the term Tenant with reference to the Tamil Nadu Buildings (Lease and Rent Control) Act, 1960 under Section 2(8) which runs as follows:

(8) "tenant" means any person by whom or on whose account rent is payable for a building and includes the surviving spouse, or any son, or daughter, or the legal representative of a deceased tenant who-
(i) in the case of a residential building, had been living with the tenant in the building as a member of the tenant's family upto the death of the tenant, and
(ii) in the case of a non-residential building, had been in continuous association with the tenant for the purpose of carrying on business of the, tenant upto the death of the tenant and continues to carry on such business thereafter, and
a person continuing in possession after the termination of the tenancy in his favour, but does not include a person placed in occupation of a building by its tenant or a person to whom the collection of rents or fees in a public market, cart stand or slaughter-house or of rents for shops, has been framed out or leased by a Municipal Council or a Panchayat Union Council or the Municipal Corporation of Madras or the Municipal Corporation of Madurai.

== Discussions ==
As stated above as long as the existence of valid tenancy between the parties then they are implied to be discharging their part of statutory obligations of "give and take" policy of "payments of rent" and "receipt of rent" towards the demised premises and that of amenities attached with the demised premises.

So as long as the parties are "paying and receiving" the rents then they are comes under a single roof of landlord and tenant for which it is pertinent point to go through the landmark decision dated 7 August 2009 as rendered by the Hon'ble Madras High Court in its Judgment in M.S.Venkatesh Kumar and another Vs. M/s.Prasath Associates which is reported in 2001(4) CTC 371 in para 9 has held as follows: "the term "Rent" would include all payments agreed to be paid by the tenant to his landlord for the use and occupation, not only of the building and furniture, but also for electricity, water and other amenities and that in other words, any sum of money which the tenant agrees to pay as consideration for the tenancy would be rent. So, in the aforesaid judgments rendered by this Court and the Honourable Apex Court it has been categorically mentioned that the rent means any sum of money as agreed as rent and other amenities payable for the occupation of the tenant in the demised premises."

Similarly in yet another decision the Hon'ble Madras High Court further held that, "the term "amenity" shall means and includes as follows: “Any facility afforded for the pleasurable enjoyment by the tenants of the premises would constitute an amenity" which is reported in 1972 TLNJ 186.

== See also ==
- Tamil Nadu Buildings (Lease and Rent Control) Act, 1960
- List of building types

== Gallery ==
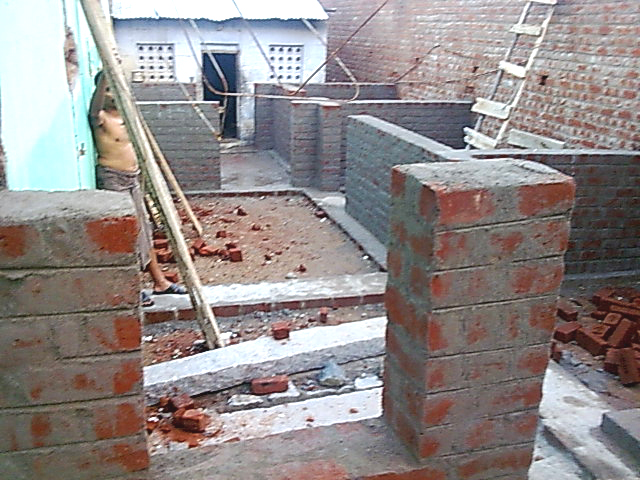
House construction in Tamil Nadu

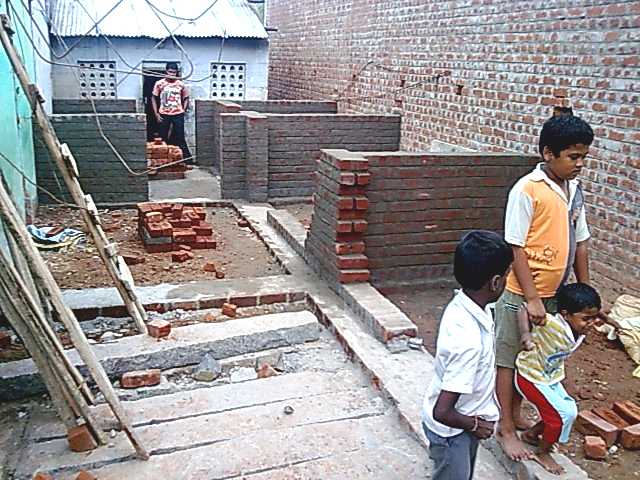
House construction in Tamil Nadu

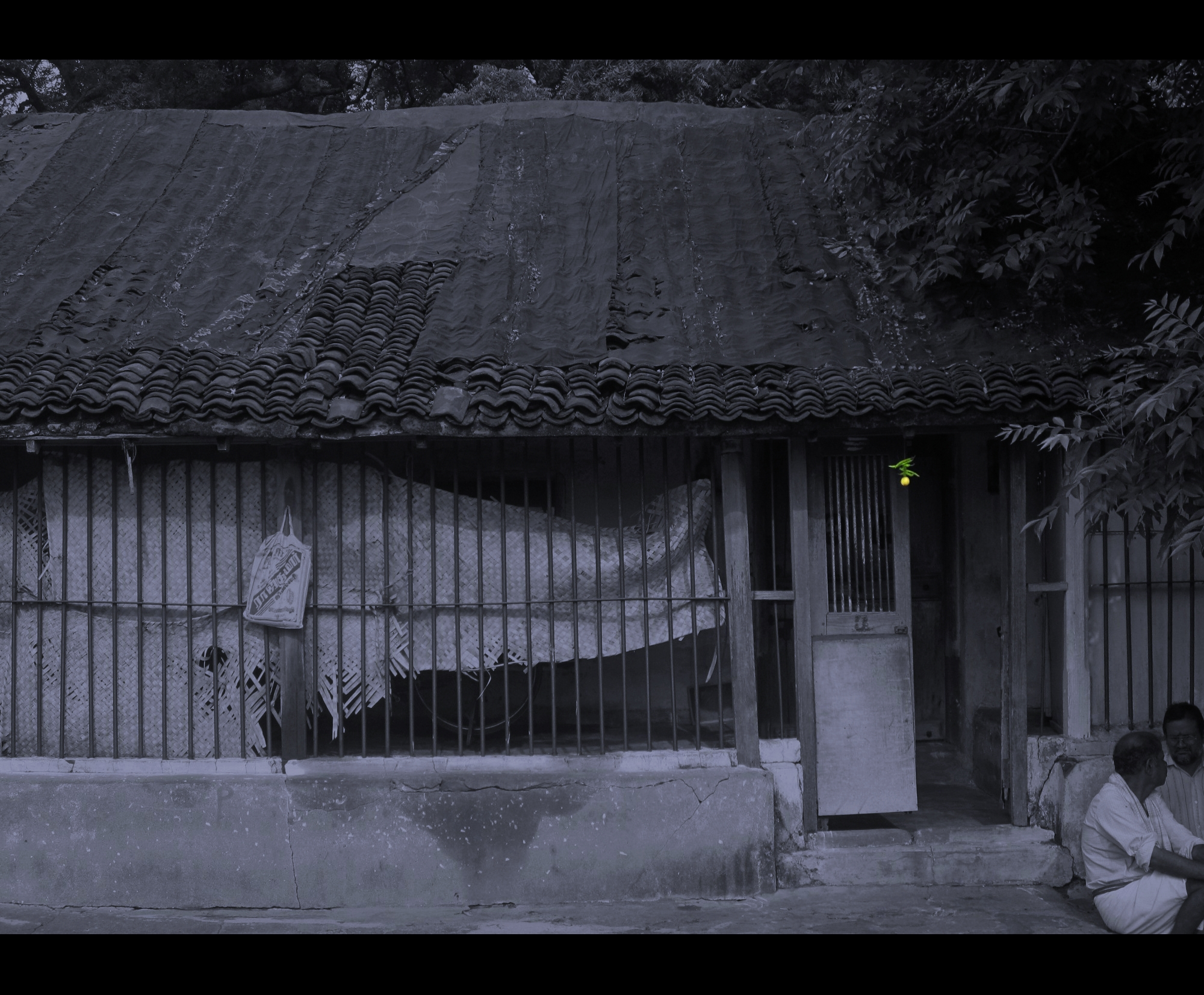
Now-a-days no such type of house is built up

== See also ==
- Glossary of legal terms
- Legal terms
