= Indian black money =

Income from India's black market or hidden from taxation

Map of tax havens, using the 2007 proposed "Stop Tax Haven Abuse Act"

In India, black money is funds earned on the black market, on which income and other taxes have not been paid. Also, the unaccounted for money that is concealed from the tax administrator is called black money. Black money is accumulated by criminals, smugglers, and tax-evaders. In India, around ₹22,000 crores are supposed to have been accumulated by the criminals for vested interests, though writ petitions in the supreme court estimate this to be even larger, at ₹900 lakh crores.

The total amount of black money deposited in foreign banks by Indians is unknown. Some reports claim a total of US$1.06 – $1.40 trillion is held illegally in Switzerland. Other reports, including those reported by the Swiss Bankers Association and the Government of Switzerland, claim these reports are false and fabricated, and the total amount held in all Swiss bank accounts by citizens of India is about US$2 billion. In February 2012, the director of India's Central Bureau of Investigation said that Indians have US$500 billion of illegal funds in foreign tax havens, more than any other country. In March 2012, the government of India clarified in its parliament that the CBI director's statement on $500 billion of illegal money was an estimate based on a statement made to India's Supreme Court in July 2011.

In March 2018, it was revealed that the amount of Indian black money currently present in Swiss and other offshore banks is estimated to be ₹300 lakh crores or US$4 trillion.

== Sources of black money income ==
The root cause for the increasing rate of black money in the country is the lack of strict punishments for the offenders. The criminals pay bribes to the tax authorities to hide their corrupt activities. Thus, they are rarely punished by the judge. The criminals who conceal their accounts from the government authorities include big politicians, film stars, cricketers, and businessmen. Some Indian corporations practice transfer mispricing, by under-invoicing their exports and over-invoicing their imports from tax haven countries such as Singapore, UAE, and Hong Kong. Thus, the promoters of the public limited companies who hold rarely more than 10% of share capital, earn black money abroad at the cost of majority share holders and tax income to the Indian government. By the year 2008, the cumulative Illicit Financial Out flows from the country touched US$452 billion.

Political organizations, corrupt politicians and government officials take bribes from foreign companies then park or invest the money abroad in tax havens for transferring to India when needed. In addition, locally earned bribes, funds and collections are often routed abroad through hawala channels in order to evade Indian tax authorities and consequent legal implications.

In the Vodafone-Hutchison tax case, a foreign multinational company also evaded tax payments in India by making transactions with shell companies registered in tax haven countries.

The unlawfully acquired money kept abroad is routed back to India by the round tripping processes. Round tripping involves getting the money out of one country, sending it to a place like Mauritius and then, dressed up to look like foreign capital, sending it back home to earn non favourable profits.

Foreign direct investment (FDI) is one of the legal channels to invest in Indian stock and financial markets. As per data released by the Department of Industrial Policy and Promotion (DIPP), two of the topmost sources of the cumulative inflows from April 2000 to March 2011 are Mauritius (41.80 per cent, US$54.227 billion) and Singapore (9.17 per cent, US$11.895 billion). It is not plausible that the small economies of Mauritius and Singapore are the true origins of such huge investments. It is apparent that the investments are being routed through these jurisdictions in order to conceal from revenue authorities the identities of such tax evaders; In many cases they are Indian residents who have invested in their own companies.

Investment in the Indian stock market through participatory notes (PNs) or overseas derivative instruments (ODIs) is another way in which the black money generated by Indians is re-invested in India. The investor in PNs does not hold the Indian securities in her or his own name. These are legally held by the FIIs, but derive economic benefits from fluctuations in prices of the Indian securities, as also dividends and capital gains, through specifically designed contracts.

Foreign funds received by charitable organisations, non-government organisations (NGOs) and other associations need not disclose the Indian beneficiary.

Gold imports through official channel and smuggling is a major conduit to bring back the black money from abroad and convert into local black money as the gold commands high demand among the rural investors particularly. Also fictitious high value round trip transactions via tax haven countries by diamonds and precious stones exporters and importers is a channel for to and fro transactions outside the country. Also, fictitious software exports can be booked by software companies to bring black money into India as tax exemptions are permitted to software companies.

Unlike in earlier decades, the interest rates offered abroad in US currency is negligible and there is no capital appreciation if the money is parked abroad by the Indians. So, Indians are routing their foreign funds back to India as the capital appreciation in Indian capital markets is far more attractive.

== The use of Swiss banks for storing black money ==
In early 2011, several reports in the Indian media alleged Swiss Bankers Association officials to have said that the largest depositors of illegal foreign money in Switzerland are Indians. These allegations were later denied by Swiss Bankers Association as well as the central bank of Switzerland that tracks total deposits held in Switzerland by Swiss and non-Swiss citizens, and by wealth managers as fiduciaries of non-Swiss citizens.

James Nason of Swiss Bankers Association in an interview about allowed black money from India, suggests "The (black money) figures were rapidly picked up in the Indian media and in Indian opposition circles, and circulated as gospel truth. However, this story was a complete fabrication. The Swiss Bankers Association never said or published such a report. Anyone claiming to have such figures (for India) should be forced to identify their source and explain the methodology used to produce them."

In August 2010, the government revised the Double Taxation Avoidance Agreement to provide means for investigations of black money in Swiss banks. This revision, expected to become active by January 2012, will allow the government to make inquiries of Swiss banks in cases where they have specific information about possible black money being stored in Switzerland.

In 2011, the Indian government received the names of 782 Indians who had accounts with HSBC. As of December 2011, the Finance Ministry has refused to reveal the names, for privacy reasons, though they did confirm that no current Members of Parliament are on the list. In response to demands from the Bharatiya Janata Party (BJP) opposition party for the release of the information, the government announced on 15 December that, while it would not publish the names, it would publish a white paper about the HSBC information.

According to White Paper on Black Money in India report, published in May 2012, Swiss National Bank estimates that the total amount of deposits in all Swiss banks, at the end of 2010, by citizens of India were CHF 1.95 billion (INR 92.95 billion, US$2.1 billion). The Swiss Ministry of External Affairs has confirmed these figures upon request for information by the Indian Ministry of External Affairs. This amount is about 700 fold less than the alleged $1.4 trillion in some media reports.

In February 2012, Central Bureau of Investigation (CBI) director A P Singh speaking at the inauguration of first Interpol global programme on anti-corruption and asset recovery said: "It is estimated that around 500 billion dollars of illegal money belonging to Indians is deposited in tax havens abroad. Largest depositors in Swiss Banks are also reported to be Indians". In a hint at scams involving ministers, Singh said: "I am prompted to recall a famous verse from ancient Indian scriptures, which says – यथा राजा तथा प्रजा. In other words, if the King is immoral so would be his subjects" The CBI Director later clarified in India's parliament that the $500 billion of illegal money was an estimate based on a statement made to India's Supreme Court in July 2011.

After formal inquiries and tallying data provided by banking officials outside India, the government of India claimed in May 2012 that the deposits of Indians in Swiss banks constitute only 0.13 per cent of the total bank deposits of citizens of all countries. Further, the share of Indians in the total bank deposits of citizens of all countries in Swiss banks has reduced from 0.29 per cent in 2006 to 0.13 per cent in 2010.

The through the Investigation Division of the Central Board of Direct Taxes released a White Paper on Black Money giving the Income Tax Department increased powers.

== 2015 HSBC leaks ==
In February 2015, balances for the year 2006–07 in HSBC's Geneva branch. The list was obtained by French newspaper Le Monde and included the names of several prominent businessmen, diamond traders and politicians. The number of Indian HSBC clients is roughly double the 628 names that French authorities gave to the Indian Government in 2011. Indian government said it will probe into this matter. The balance against the 1195 names stood at ₹25,420 crore (US$2.6 billion).

The list which had names of dictators and international criminals, was simultaneously published by news organisations in 45 countries including The Guardian, UK; Haaretz, Israel; BBC, London. HSBC had helped its clients evade taxes and said in a statement that "standards of due diligence were significantly lower than today."

== 2016 Panama Papers leak ==
The 2016 Panama Papers scandal is the largest-ever leak of information on black money in history. The International Consortium of Investigative Journalists first obtained the leaked information, revealing over 11 million documents. These documents pertain to 214,000 offshore entities and span almost 40 years. The papers originated from Mossack Fonseca, a Panama-based law firm with offices in more than 35 countries. The list of names exposed in the scandal includes 500 Indians who flouted rules and regulations, such as Amitabh Bachchan, Aishwarya Rai, Niira Radia, KP Singh, Garware family, Harish Salve, and others.

== 2016 demonetisation drive ==
From 2011 to 2014, the BJP included the return of Indian black money in their manifesto. In speeches, their prime ministerial candidate Narendra Modi promised to get this black money (estimated to be ₹90 lakh crores or US$1500 billion) back to India.

On 8 November 2016, in a sudden address to the nation, the Prime Minister Narendra Modi announced that banknotes of ₹500 and ₹1000 would cease to be legal tender from midnight. He said this decision was taken to crack down on black money and corruption which was destroying the country. He also said that the process of cash circulation was directly related to corruption in his country impacting the lower classes of society. However, neither Indian banks, nor the Reserve Bank of India (RBI) were adequately prepared for this, resulting in currency shortages up to March 2018 and difficulties for Indian citizens.

As per government figures, the number of income tax returns filed for 2016–17 grew by 25 per cent to 2.82 crores (compared to growth rate of 9.9% in the previous year), and the advance tax collections during that period rose 41.8% over the one-year period, as more individuals filed their tax returns after demonetization. By 28 December 2016, official sources said that the Income Tax department detected over ₹41.72 billion (US$430 million) of un-disclosed income and seized new notes worth ₹1.05 billion (US$11 million) as part of its country-wide operations. The department carried out a total of 983 search, survey and enquiry operations and has issued 5,027 notices to various entities on charges of tax evasion and hawala-like dealings. The department also seized cash and jewellery worth over ₹5.49 billion (US$57 million) out of which the new currency seized (the majority of them ₹2000 notes) is valued at about ₹1.05 billion (US$11 million). The department also referred a total of 477 cases to other agencies like the CBI and the Enforcement Directorate (ED) to probe other financial crimes like money laundering, disproportionate assets and corruption.

== Domestic black money ==
The Economic Times reported that Indian companies as well as politicians routinely misuse public trusts for money laundering. India has no centralized repository— like the registrar of companies for corporates—of information on public trusts.

== SIT and Supreme court case ==
Noted jurist and former law minister Ram Jethmalani along with many other well known citizens filed a Writ Petition (Civil) No. 176 of 2009 in the Supreme Court of India (SC) seeking the court's directions to help bring back black money stashed in tax havens abroad and initiate efforts to strengthen the governance framework to prevent further creation of black money.

In January 2011, the SC asked why the names of those who have stashed money in the Liechtenstein Bank have not been disclosed. The court argued that the government should be more forthcoming in releasing all available information on what it called a "mind-boggling" amount of money that is believed to be held illegally in foreign banks.

The SC on 4 July 2011, ordered the appointment of a Special Investigating Team (SIT) headed by former SC judge BP Jeevan Reddy to act as a watch dog and monitor investigations dealing with the black money. This body would report to the SC directly and no other agency will be involved in this. The two judge bench observed that the failure of the government to control the phenomenon of black money is an indication of weakness and softness of the government.

The issue of unaccounted monies held by nationals, and other legal entities, in foreign banks, is of primordial importance to the welfare of the citizens. The quantum of such monies may be rough indicators of the weakness of the State, in terms of both crime prevention, and also of tax collection. Depending on the volume of such monies, and the number of incidents through which such monies are generated and secreted away, it may very well reveal the degree of "softness of the State."

— Justice B Sudershan Reddy and Justice S S Nijjar, Supreme Court of India, Source:

The government subsequently challenged this order through Interlocutory Application No. 8 of 2011. The bench (consisting of Justice Altamas Kabir in place of Justice B Sudershan Reddy, since Justice Reddy retired) on 23 September 2011 pronounced a split verdict on whether government plea is maintainable. Justice Kabir said that the plea is maintainable while Justice Nijjar said it is not. Due to this split verdict, the matter will be referred to a third judge.

In April 2014, Indian Government disclosed to the Supreme Court the names of 26 people who had accounts in banks in Liechtenstein, as revealed to India by German authorities.

On 27 October 2014, Indian Government submitted name of three people in an affidavit to the Supreme Court who have black money account in foreign countries. But on the very next day, Supreme Court of India orders centre Government to reveal all the names of black money account holders which they had received from various countries like Germany. The honorable bench of the Supreme court also asked the Centre not to indulge in any kind of probe rather just pass the names to them and Supreme court will pass the order for further probe.

But the facts were the other way round, as the clarification affidavit filed by the Finance Ministry on 27 October revealed. The affidavit asserted that a complete list of cases where information had been obtained from the German and French governments, with the status of the action taken by the government was submitted by the Central Board of Direct Taxes on 27 June. It added that the CBDT officials also met and briefed the SIT on the status of the cases, background of the information received, non-sharing of information by Swiss authorities, and constraints faced by the government and alternative methods of securing account details.

On 12 May 2015, Ram Jethmalani attacked Modi Government for failing to bring back the Black money as was promised before Election.

International tax lawyer Ashish Goel has argued that the Modi Government failed miserably to take steps to bring back black money stacked in foreign banks.

On 2 November 2015, HSBC whistleblower Herve Falciani said he is willing to "cooperate" with the Indian investigative agencies in black money probe but would need "protection". Prashant Bhushan and Yogendra Yadav furnished a letter written by Falciani on 21 August 2015, to Justice (retd) M B Shah, who is heading the SIT on black money. Under the supervision of the SIT the I-T department has recovered just around Rs 3,500 crore from some of the account holders and expected to recover a total of 10000 crore till March 2015.

=== Double taxation agreements ===
Indian Government has repeatedly argued before the Court that it cannot divulge the names. It has further argued that the privacy of individuals would be violated by the revelation of data. These arguments are only designed to stall the revelation of names of some favoured entities. BJP leader Dr. Subramanian Swamy said that DTA was not a valid reason for not revealing names of the accounts of Indians held in foreign banks.

DTA Agreement is about declared white incomes of entities so that tax may be levied in one or the other country and not in both. Black income is not revealed in either of the two countries so there is no question of double taxation. Further, this data would not be available to either of the two countries to be exchanged. It is no wonder then that till date, no data has been supplied to India by any of the countries with which this treaty has been signed. In brief, DTAA is about white incomes and not black incomes, so it is disingenuous to say that in future no data would be given to us if names are given to courts.

=== Criticism of government ===
Different governments have tried to stall SIT. A bank has been revealed to have acted like a "hawala" operator. Other MNC and private Indian banks are also suspected to have indulged in these activities.

The HSBC Black money whistleblower Herve Falciani, who works with a team of lawyers and experts, told NDTV that there is "1000 times more information" available for investigators and there are a lot of business procedures to be unveiled to them. "It's just up to (the Indian administration). They can contact us," he said. He said India was given only 2 MB of the 200 GB of data. "If India asks tomorrow we will send a proposal tomorrow," he added. On 2 November 2015, Falciani told in a press conference organised by Prashant Bhushan and Yogendra Yadav that, India has not used information on those illegally stashing away black money in foreign bank accounts, and still millions of crores were flowing out.

== Hasan Ali case ==
Hasan Ali was arrested by Enforcement Directorate and the Income Tax Department on charges of stashing over ₹60 billion in foreign banks. ED lawyers said Hasan Ali had financed international arms dealer Adnan Khashoggi on several occasions.

However, media sources claimed this case is becoming yet another perfect instance of how investigative agencies like Income Tax Department go soft on high-profile offenders. Hasan Ali's premises were raided by ED as far back as 2016. According to several news reports, the probe against him has proceeded at an extremely slow pace and seems to have hit a dead end.

Today claimed that it had verified a letter confirming the US$8 billion in black money was in UBS bank account, and the government of India too has verified this with UBS.

The UBS bank has denied Indian reports alleging that it maintained a business relationship with or had any assets or accounts for Hasan Ali. Upon formal request by Indian and Thailand government authorities, the bank announced that the documentation supposedly corroborating such allegations were forged, and numerous media reports claiming US$8 billion in stashed black money were false. Today, in a later article, wrote, "Hasan Ali stands accused of massive tax evasion and stashing money in secret bank accounts abroad. But the problem is that the law enforcement agencies have precious little evidence to back their claims. For one, UBS Zurich has already denied having any dealings with Hasan Ali."

== Estimates ==
As Schneider estimates, using the dynamic multiple-indicators multiple-causes method and by currency demand method, the size of India's black money economy is between 23 and 26%, compared to an Asia-wide average of 28 to 30%, to an Africa-wide average to 41 to 44%, and to a Latin America-wide average of 41 to 44% of respective gross domestic products. According to this study, the average size of the shadow economy (as a percent of "official" GDP) in 96 developing countries is 38.7%, with India below average.

== Public protests and government's response ==
In May 2012, the Government of India published a white paper on black money. It disclosed India's effort at addressing black money and guidelines to prevent black money in the future.

=== MC Joshi committee ===
After a series of ongoing demonstrations and protests across India, the government appointed a high-level committee headed by MC Joshi (the then CBDT Chairman) in June 2011 to study the generation and curbing of black money. The committee finalised its draft report on 30 January 2012. Its key observation and recommendations were:

1. The two major national parties (an apparent reference to Indian National Congress, BJP) claim to have incomes of merely ₹5 billion (US$52 million) and ₹2 billion (US$21 million). But this isn't "even a fraction" of their expenses. These parties spend between ₹100 billion (US$1.0 billion) and ₹150 billion (US$1.6 billion) annually on election expenses alone.
2. Change maximum punishment under Prevention of Corruption Act from the present 3, 5 and 7 years to 2, 7 and 10 years rigorous imprisonment and also changes in the years of punishment in the Income Tax Act.
3. Taxation is a highly specialised subject. Based on domain knowledge, set up all-India judicial service and a National Tax Tribunal.
4. Just as the USA Patriot Act under which global financial transactions above a threshold limit (by or with Americans) get reported to law enforcement agencies, India should insist on entities operating in India to report all global financial transactions above a threshold limit.
5. Consider introducing an amnesty scheme with reduced penalties and immunity from prosecution to the people who bring back black money from abroad.

=== Tax Information Exchange Agreements ===
To curb black money, India has signed TIEA with 13 countries—Gibraltar, Bahamas, Bermuda, the British Virgin Islands, the Isle of Man, the Cayman Islands, Jersey, Liberia, Monaco, Macau, Argentina, Guernsey and Bahrain – where money is believed to have been stashed away. India and Switzerland, claims a report, have agreed to allow India to routinely obtain banking information about Indians in Switzerland from 1 April 2011.

In June 2014, the Finance Minister Arun Jaitely on behalf of the Indian government requested the Swiss Government to hand over all the bank details and names of Indians having unaccounted money in Swiss banks.

== Demonetisation of 500 and 1000 rupee currency notes ==
Following recommendations from the OECD on curbing black money on 22–23 February 2014 and previous moves by the RBI, on the night of 8 November 2016 the Indian Government decided to ban old notes and change them with new 500 and 2000 rupee notes. Similar moves had been made earlier in pre-independence era in 1946 and also in 1978 by the first non-Congress government called Janata government. ATMs all over India remained closed for two days and banks for one day. Also, until 31 December, people were only allowed to withdraw Rs 2,500 maximum per day from ATMs, Rs 24,000 per week from banks. Online bank transactions have been granted exemption from such limits. The issuing of the ₹2000 sought to throw hoarders of black money off by rendering the cash money they held in large denomination currency notes as useless. This meant they would need to get the notes exchanged at a bank or post office, which would be near impossible due to the exchange limits. Additionally, banks and authorities would question the large amounts of cash held by many hoarders, who now risked an official investigation being launched into their money situation. Economists and financial analysts believe that a large percentage of black money being held in cash in India would now be brought into the mainstream economy through the banks, which would bolster economic growth over the long term. Furthermore, the move is also intended as a way to cut down on the funding of terrorism, by rendering useless the large currency denominations of black money or counterfeit currency being paid to sleeper cells.

=== Previous Information ===
In 2012, the Central Board of Direct Taxes had recommended demonetisation, saying in a report that "demonetisation may be a solution for tackling black money or economy, although it is largely held in the form of benami properties, bullion and jewellery". According to data from income tax probes, black money holders keep about 9% of their ill-gotten wealth as cash, hence targeting this cash may be considered as a successful strategy.

On 28 October 2016 the total banknotes in circulation in India was ₹17.77 trillion (US$180 billion). In terms of value, the annual report of Reserve Bank of India (RBI) of 31 March 2016 stated that total bank notes in circulation valued to ₹16.42 trillion (US$170 billion) of which nearly 86% (around ₹14.18 trillion (US$150 billion)) were ₹500 and ₹1,000 banknotes. In terms of volume, the report stated that 24% (around 22.03 billion) of the total 90266 million banknotes were in circulation.

In the past, the Bharatiya Janata Party (BJP) had opposed demonetisation. BJP spokesperson Meenakshi Lekhi had said in 2014 that "The aam aurats and the aadmis (general population), those who are illiterate and have no access to banking facilities, will be the ones to be hit by such diversionary measures."

The Government of India devised an Income Declaration Scheme (IDS), which opened on 1 June and ended on 30 September 2016. Under the scheme, the black money holders could come clean by declaring the assets, paying the tax and penalty of 45% thereafter.

Modi said that the queues due to demonetisation were the last queues that would end all other queues.

== Proposals to prevent Indian black money ==
=== History ===
Even in colonial India, numerous committees and efforts were initiated to identify and stop underground economy and black money with the goal of increasing the tax collection by the British Crown government. For example, in 1936 Ayers Committee investigated black money from the Indian colony. It suggested major amendments to protect and encourage the honest taxpayer and effectively deal with fraudulent evasion.

=== Current Proposals ===
In its white paper on black money, India has made the following proposals to tackle its underground economy and black money.

=== Reducing disincentives against voluntary compliance ===
Excessive tax rates increase black money and tax evasion. When tax rates approach 100 per cent, tax revenues approach zero, because higher is the incentive for tax evasion and greater the propensity to generate black money. The report finds that punitive taxes create an economic environment where economic agents are not left with any incentive to produce.

Another cause of black money, the report finds is the high transaction costs associated with compliance with the law. Opaque and complicated regulations are other major disincentive that hinders compliance and pushes people towards underground economy and creation of black money. Compliance burden includes excessive need for compliance time, as well as excessive resources to comply.

Lower taxes and simpler compliance process reduces black money, suggests the white paper.

=== Banking transaction tax ===
Arthakranti, Pune-based think-tank has outlined policy prescription that involves replacement of most direct and indirect levies with a banking transaction tax and de-monetisation of currency notes of Rs 500 and Rs 1,000 to help prevent Indian black money, ease inflation, improve employment generation and also lower corruption.

=== Economic liberalisation ===
The report suggests that non-tariff barriers to economic activity such as permits and licences, long delays in getting approvals from government agencies are an incentive to proceed with underground economy and hide black money. When one can not obtain a licence to undertake a legitimate activity, the transaction costs approach infinity, and create insurmountable incentives for unreported and unaccounted activities that will inevitably generate black money. The successive waves of economic liberalisation in India since the 1990s have encouraged compliance and taxes collected by the government of India have dramatically increased over this period. The process of economic liberalisation must be relentlessly continued to further remove underground economy and black money, suggests the report.

=== Reforms in vulnerable sectors of the economy ===
Certain vulnerable sectors of Indian economy are more prone to underground economy and black money than others. These sectors need systematic reforms. As example, the report offers gold trading, which was one of the major sources of black money generation and even crime prior to the reforms induced in that sector. While gold inflows into India have remained high after reforms, gold smuggling is no longer the menace as it used to be. Similar effective reforms of other vulnerable sectors like real estate, the report suggests can yield a significant dividend in the form of reducing generation of black money in the long term.

The real estate sector in India constitutes about 11 per cent of its GDP. Investment in property is a common means of parking unaccounted money and a large number of transactions in real estate are not reported or are under-reported. This is mainly on account of very high levels of property transaction taxes, commonly in the form of stamp duty. High transaction taxes in property are one of the biggest impediments to the development of an efficient property market. Real estate transactions also involve complicated compliance and high transactions costs in terms of search, advertising, commissions, registration, and contingent costs related to title disputes and litigation. People of India find it easier to deal with real estate transactions and opaque paperwork by paying bribes and through cash payments and under-declaration of value. Unless the real estate transaction process and tax structure is simplified, the report suggests this source of black money will be difficult to prevent. Old and complicated laws such as the Urban Land Ceiling Regulation Act and Rent Control Act need to be repealed, property value limits and high tax rates eliminated, while Property Title Certification system dramatically simplified.

Other sectors of Indian economy needing reform, as identified by the report, include equity trading market, mining permits, bullion and non-profit organisations.

=== Creating effective credible deterrence ===
Effective and credible deterrence is necessary in combination with reforms, transparency, simple processes, elimination of bureaucracy and discretionary regulations. Credible deterrence needs to be cost effective, claims the report. Such deterrence to black money can be achieved by information technology (integration of databases), integration of systems and compliance departments of the Indian government, direct tax administration, adding data mining capabilities, and improving prosecution processes.

=== Supportive measures ===
Along with deterrence, the report suggests public awareness initiatives must be launched. Public support for reforms and compliance are necessary for long-term solution to black money. In addition, financial auditors of companies have to be made more accountable for distortions and lapses. The report suggests Whistleblower laws must be strengthened to encourage reporting and tax recovery.

=== Amnesty ===
Amnesty programmes have been proposed to encourage voluntary disclosure by tax evaders. These voluntary schemes have been criticized on the grounds that they provide a premium on dishonesty and are unfair to honest taxpayers, as well as for their failure to achieve the objective of unearthing undisclosed money. The report suggests that such amnesty programmes can not be an effective and lasting solution, nor one that is routine.

=== Excessive demonetised currency notes ===
After the recent demonetisation of old 500 and 1000 Rs notes, the Reserve Bank of India (RBI) collected more of these notes, worth over INR 2 trillion, than it had officially released into circulation earlier. The value of fake notes received by RBI is negligible compared to total value. The Government of India plans to conduct a thorough probe to reveal how this occurred and catch those responsible. One possible cause is thought to have been unscrupulous politicians wielding power with collusion of top RBI managers.

=== International enforcement ===
India has Double Tax Avoidance Agreements with 82 nations, including all popular tax haven countries. Of these, India has expanded agreements with 30 countries which requires mutual effort to collect taxes on behalf of each other, if a citizen attempts to hide black money in the other country. The report suggests that the Agreements be expanded to other countries as well to help with enforcement.

=== Modified currency notes ===
Government printing of such legal currency notes of highest denomination i.e.; ₹1,000 (US$10) and ₹500 (US$5.20) which remain in the market for only 2 years. After a 2-year period is expired there should be a one-year grace period during which these currency notes should be submitted and accepted only in bank accounts. Following this grace period the currency notes will cease to be accepted as legal tender or destroyed under the instructions of The Reserve Bank of India. As a consequence turning most of the unaccountable money into accountable and taxable money.

=== Holding United States currency ===
Many people in India who want to stash black money keep it as cash in US$ which will fetch appreciation in its value also as the INR gets devalued against US currency. GoI should tighten the rules to prevent acquiring/holding of the foreign currency (FC) cash in huge quantities by tracking cash transactions in US$ and limiting FC availability in small value through reputed banks / authorised firms by cashless transaction only. Smuggling of US$ into the country by NRIs, foreign tourists shall be curbed at entry ports. NRIs / foreign tourists shall conduct cashless transactions for acquiring INR currency, etc. All Indians who are going abroad should use international credit / debit cards instead of carrying US$ in cash with them. This would also prevent international trade in narcotics, terrorist funding, etc.

=== Corruption in education ===
Many institutions that are meant to provide education have been promoting corruption, and education has been a major contributor to domestic black money in India. Single common entrance exams for various professional courses (medicine and allied, engineering and allied, business management and allied), releasing the audited financial statements of the trusts/not-for-profit organizations that own these educational institutions in the public domain (website, a common e-repository), stoppage of government funds from AICTE, DST etc. to such institutions, are some of the suggestions to reduce the generation of black money in education. As per a report submitted by National Institute of Public Finance and Policy (NIPFP) to the Finance Ministry in December 2013, the capitation fees collected by private colleges, on management quota seats in professional courses, the previous year was around Rs 5,953 crores.

=== Withdrawal of currency notes of higher denomination ===
There have been suggestions to withdraw currency notes of higher denominations, such as the 2000 rupee notes. While this could lead to an increase in printing costs for the RBI, these costs should be weighed against the costs for misuse of high-value notes.

== Books ==
Black money in India has been a popular subject of discussion but not many books have been authored on the subject.

Books that have been authored on the subject of black money in India include:

1. The Black White & Grey: Re-coloring the Rupiah by Pragun Akhil Jindal
2. The Black Economy by Arun Kumar

=== The Black White & Grey ===
The book The Black White & Grey: Re-Coloring The Rupiah, authored by Pragun Jindal and published by Money Worries, looks at the black money menace and ways to curb it.

Senior Congress Leader Manish Tewari and political commentator Paranjoy Guha Thakurta on 13 December 2016 launched the book, which attempts to debunk "a lot of lies, unknown facts and baseless rumours about Black Money".

"A delinquent like poverty only affects the poor, unemployment affects those who are unemployed, alcoholism and drug abuse affect those who devour them, black money is a hitch which does not affect persons who amass 'black dough' but it affects the common man in the populace", said the author at the book's launch event.

== Estimates of Black Money in India by various organizations ==
Organization	Estimation of Black money in India
International Monetary Fund	50% of gross domestic product
Central Bureau of Investigation (India)	₹28 lakh crores
World Bank	20% of gross domestic product

In India, there is a lack of deterrent punishment for holding black money. As per one survey Between 2008 and 2012, more than 20,000 cases of corruption were filed and only 20 percent of cases reached final conclusion.

Indian economy is also called parallel economy or shadow economy because it is very difficult to distinguish between black money and white money of the total money circulated in the economy.

It is important to mention that Black money is generated by one person but its effect is felt by another person. For Instance, the government is not able to form and implement apt social welfare policies for poor and disadvantaged people of society due to low level of tax revenue as people holding black money do not pay taxes

It is also important to mention that black money can also be generated by legal sources also. For Instance, those government doctors and teachers who do private practice at home violate laws as they are not allowed to do private practice and consequently do tax evasion by not disclosing taxable income. This results in the generation of black money as it affects the tax revenue of the government.

Moreover, some forms of betting are legal (not counted in black money) in India like winning money from horse races.

== See also ==
- Black Money (Undisclosed Foreign Income and Assets) and Imposition of Tax Act, 2015
- Corruption in India
- Debt bondage in India
- Gold import policy of India
- Nagarwala case
- List of scandals in India
- 2012 Indian anti-corruption movement
- 2011 Indian anti-corruption movement
- International asset recovery
- United Nations Convention against Corruption
