= Gold (Control) Act, 1968 =

Act of the Parliament of India, replaces Act 18 of 1965

Parliament of India
- Long title: An Act to provide, in the economic and financial interests of the community, for the control of the production, manufacture, supply, distribution, use and possession of, and business in, gold, ornaments and articles of gold and for matters connected therewith or incidental thereto.
- Citation: Act No. 45 of 1968
- Territorial extent: whole of India
- Assented to: 1 September 1968
- Commenced: 1 September 1968
- Repealed: 6 June 1990

Repeals
- Gold (Control) Act, 1965 (18 of 1965); Gold (Control) Ordinance, 1968 (6 of 1968)

Repealed by
- Gold (Control) Repeal Act, 1990 (18 of 1990)
- Status: Repealed

The Gold (Control) Act, 1968 is a repealed Act of the Parliament of India which was enacted to control the sale and holding of gold in personal possession. High demand for gold in India with negligible indigenous production results in gold imports, leading to drastic devaluation of the Indian rupee and depletion of foreign exchange reserves to alarming levels. Devaluation of the Indian rupee also leads to steep rises in food commodity prices due to costlier petroleum products imports. In these circumstances, the gold import policy of India aimed at curbing the gold imports to a manageable level time to time by imposing taxes and legal restrictions.

World gold output (in kilograms)

== Gold Control Act ==
Post-Independence, the foreign exchange drain was accentuated in 1962 during the border dispute with China. Morarji Desai, then-Finance Minister of India, came out with Gold Control Act, 1962, which recalled all gold loans given by banks and banned forward trading in gold. In 1963, the production of gold jewellery above 14 carat fineness was banned. In 1965, a gold bond scheme was launched with tax immunity for unaccounted wealth. All these steps failed to yield the desired result. Desai finally introduced the Gold Control Act, on 24 August 1968, which prohibited citizens from owning gold in the form of bars and coins. All existing holdings of gold coins and bars had to be converted into jewelry and declared to the authorities. Goldsmiths were not allowed to own more than 100 g of gold. Licensed dealers were not supposed to own more than 2 kg of gold, depending upon the number of artisans employed by them. They were banned from trading with each other. Desai believed that Indians would respond positively to these steps and stop consuming gold and help conserve precious foreign exchange. New gold jewellery purchases were either recycled or smuggled gold. This legislation killed the official gold market and a large unofficial market sprung up dealing in cash only. The gold was smuggled in and sold through the unofficial channel wherein, many jewellers and bullion traders traded in smuggled gold. A huge black market developed for gold. Goldsmith were an unorganised labour force and could not cope with the new developed situation. Only a few could get the licence to hold the gold, that also in very small quantities, with the result that the members of the Sunar caste, who depended only on their traditional occupation of making gold ornaments, lost their business and their financial condition deteriorated and families shattered.

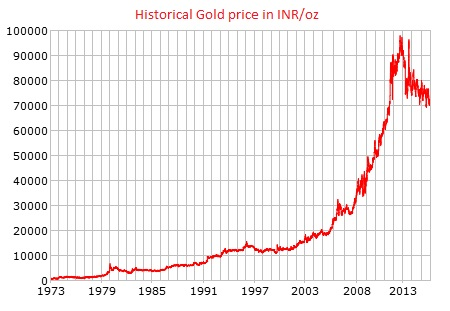
Historical Gold price in INR

In 1990, India had a major foreign exchange problems and was on verge of default on external liabilities. The Indian Government pledged 40 tons gold from their reserves with the Bank of England and avoided defaulting by securing a loan to recover. Subsequently, India embarked upon the path of economic liberalization. The era of licensing was gradually dissolved. The gold market also benefited because the government abolished the 1962 Gold Control Act on 6 June 1990. by Finance Minister Madhu Dandvate and liberalized the gold import into India on payment of a duty of Rs.250 per ten grams. The government thought it more prudent to allow free imports and earn the taxes rather than to lose it all to unofficial channel. From official imports of practically nothing in 1991, India officially imported more than 110 tonnes of gold in 1992, which now stands about 800 tonnes in a year.

In September 1999, the Govt. of India launched a Gold Deposit Scheme to utilize the idle gold and simultaneously give a return to gold owners and reduce the country's reliance on imports. However, this plan was not widely accepted by the population.

Gold ETFs are also operating in India from March 2007. Alarmed by the excessive gold imports by Indians despite the public holdings of gold is in excess of 30,000 metric tons, Indian Government introduced a new Gold Deposit Scheme with attractive benefits to the gold depositors in the year 2015 to recycle the available idling gold in the country for meeting internally the entire fresh ornamental gold demand. Government of India has nearly 550 tons of gold reserves which would help in kick starting the scheme.

== Crisis hedge not inflation hedge ==
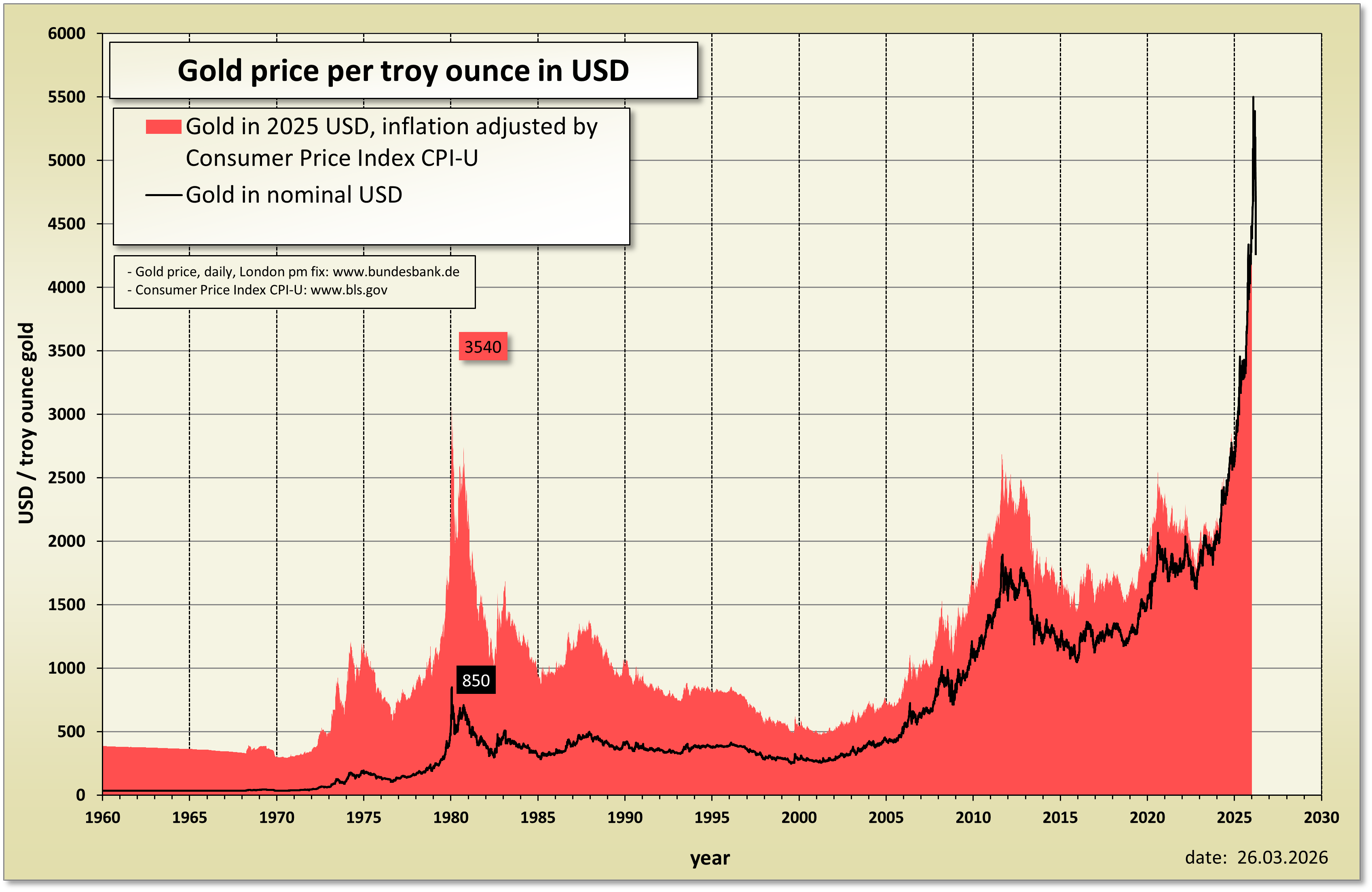
Gold price history in 1960–2014

When the inflation adjusted gold value is examined, gold is not an inflation hedge but crisis hedge. Some times, gold price apparently looks lower in US$ value but its price compared to corresponding crude oil price can be exceeding 25 times far higher than long term average of 15 times. In April 2020, one ounce of gold fetched more than 90 barrels of WTI crude oil in US in the midst of COVID-19 pandemic as gold price shot up to US$1,788/ounce. Thus during the lower oil prices period, gold acts as crisis hedge to overcome the loss of revenue from oil exports to the oil exporting countries. When oil prices are higher, it acts as crisis hedge to the oil importing countries to dispose oil stocks at profit and purchase gold with the accrued cash for replenishing oil stocks later during the lower oil price with respect to gold price. With the advent of shale oil production boom in USA, crude oil for the first time is being realistically priced in US$ irrespective of quantitative easing in USA and the agreement of USA with OPEC to transact their international crude oil exports in US$. However international gold price is fixed by the major gold importing countries like India as gold market is fully buyers market with global gold stocks amounting to 300 times of its annual consumption or 53 times of its annual production.

In India, when the agriculture production is good, it will lead to slump in the agriculture commodity prices and raise in gold price due to demand from rural areas. Similarly, when agriculture commodity prices raise due to less production, gold prices would depress by lack of demand from rural areas. During good monsoon years, Indian government can sell its gold reserves at higher price catering to the gold demand from rural areas, to finance the surplus food grains purchase obligation at minimum support price (MSP) and the supply of adequate imported fertilizers to farmers. The depleted gold reserves could be purchased back later at lower price during the subsequent bad monsoon years with the funds after selling the food grain stocks at higher price to make up shortfall in the production. This analogy can be applied to all commodities and gold can be termed as super commodity with characters of international currency. Thus Indian Government or Reserve Bank of India can overcome the economic crisis by effectively managing / hedging the gold reserves vis a vis food grain stocks or fertilizer stocks or crude oil stocks.

Gold trading daily turnover in the international commodity exchanges (NYMEX, TOCOM, HKMEx, DGCX, etc.) is of the order of 300 tons/day (nearly 110,000 tons/year) compared to 3,000 tons/year global production. However, most of the trades are squared off without actual delivery. India being the dominant importer of gold, Indian government can exercise full control on international gold trading when all its gold imports and recycled gold are channeled through it and distributed through the commodities exchanges of India.

== Current policy ==
Gold prices (US$ per troy ounce), in nominal US$ and inflation adjusted US$.

India imports in excess of 1000 tons annually (including unofficially smuggled gold) with negligible local production. The annual gold imports are around 50 billion US$ next only to crude oil imports widening the trade deficit. In the years since 2001 to 2015, the official net gold imports are 269 billion US$ whereas the Foreign Institutional Investors (FII) invested only 157 billion US$ in Indian equities. Gold imports cost is nearly 3% of the GDP. Alarmed by the huge trade deficit in the year 2012, GoI introduced moderate customs duty (below 10%) on gold imports. Though the policy is fetching good customs income, the imports demand is not drastically coming down. It is due to the reason that world gold demand is mainly driven by Indians and its price is fixed by Indians in Indian rupees. Imposing customs tax on gold imports in India or devaluation of Indian currency, led to the softening of its international price but remained range bound in rupee terms. Customs duty imposition also led to increase in gold smuggling but narrowed the trade deficit to permissible limit as the smuggled gold would not get accounted as imports in trade deficit calculations.

The gold imports are also serving to channelise undeclared earnings by exporters and importers of India. Invariably, exporters under invoice their exports whereas importers over invoice their imports to stash black money in tax haven countries. This stashed money abroad is routed to India by importing gold (official channel or smuggled) which can be disposed off in to Indian rupees as gold commands insatiable demand from rural India. This multiple malpractices by importers and exporters artificially widen the official trade deficit by three folds of the actual trade deficit subjecting Indian currency constantly at the risk of devaluation and de-rating of India by international rating agencies. It is estimated that unnecessary gold imports are retarding growth of Indian economy by at least 3% points. The customs duty forgone during the financial year 2013–14 on non-essential gold and diamonds import is Rs 48,635 crores which is constituting 16% of the total customs duty forgone.

== See also ==
- BIS hallmark
- List of largest trading partners of India
- Indian Currency Committee

- London bullion market
- World Gold Council
- List of countries by gold production

- Hatti Gold Mines
- Kolar Gold Fields

- List of gold mining disasters
- International Cyanide Management Code
