= ICMI =

The abbreviation ICMI may refer to:

- Indonesian Association of Muslim Intellectuals (Ikatan Cendekiawan Muslim Indonesia)
- International Commission on Mathematical Instruction
- International Conference on Men's Issues
- International Cyanide Management Institute
