= Transactional net margin method =

Accounting transfer pricing tax method

The transactional net margin method (TNMM) in transfer pricing compares the net profit margin of a taxpayer arising from a non-arm's length transaction with the net profit margins realized by arm's length parties from similar transactions; and examines the net profit margin relative to an appropriate base such as costs, sales or assets.

This differs from the cost-plus and resale price methods that compare gross profit margins. However, the TNMM requires a level of comparability similar to that required for the application of the cost plus and resale price methods. Where the relevant information exists at the gross margin level, taxpayers should apply the cost plus or resale price method.

Because the TNMM is a one-sided method, it is usually applied to the least complex party that does not contribute to valuable or unique intangible assets. Since TNMM measures the relationship between net profit and an appropriate base such as sales, costs, or assets employed, it is important to choose the appropriate base taking into account the nature of the business activity. The appropriate base that profits should be measured against will depend on the facts and circumstances of each case.
