= Rajkissore Dutt =

Indian businessman and fraudster (c. 1820s)

- Years active: 1826 – 1828
- Known for: committing a major fraud against the Bank of Bengal, a predecessor of the State Bank of India
- Criminal charges: criminal conspiracy, criminal breach of trust, cheating and dishonesty including delivery of property, fraud, embezzlement and misrepresentation.
- Wanted by: Bank of Bengal, State Bank of India
- Wanted since: 1826

Details
- Victims: Bank of Bengal, State Bank of India
- Location: India

Rajkissore Dutt (alternate spelling: Raj Kishore Dutt) (fl. 19th century) was a 19th-century Indian businessman, who is most notable for perpetrating a major fraud against the Bank of Bengal, which is one of the predecessors of the State Bank of India.

== Biography ==
=== Early life ===
He was born and raised in Kolkata. He was known for being a devout Hindu and he regularly worshipped the Hindu goddess Kali.

=== Career ===
He established a bank in Kolkata. The bank circulated its own banknotes and achieved significant success.

== Fraud against the Bank of Bengal ==
In 1826, he colluded with his son-in-law Dwarkey Nath Mitter to forge Company's Paper or Government Securities. The documents were forged and passed off as genuine to the public. These documents enabled him to avail a loan of Rupees three and a half lakhs from the Bank of Bengal, a predecessor of the State Bank of India.

=== Discovery and Trial ===
However, his misdeeds were soon discovered and he was tried, convicted and sentenced to transportation in the penal colonies of the East India Company, where he lived out the rest of his life.

In 1829, Mr. J. A. Dorin was the treasury secretary of the Bank of Bengal. When the documents forged by Rajkissore Dutt were presented before him for verification, he perceived some peculiarity in its printing. He forwarded the documents to the head office of the Treasury. At the Treasury, the documents were examined by Henry Prinsep, the financial secretary to the Company government. Henry Prinsep concluded that his own signatures had been forged by Rajkissore Dutt, and thus the fraud came to light.

The trial thus commenced and the final judgement was given on 30 June 1834 by the Court of Directors of the East India Company.

=== Impact on the Bank ===
The fraud had a major impact on the Bank of Bengal, which is a predecessor of the State Bank of India. The amount of the fraud was later written off towards the profit and loss account. The fraud perpetrated by Rajkissore Dutt wiped out a major part of the bank's profit for the year. The fraud also impacted the dividends paid out by the bank till the year 1834.

== Media Coverage ==
The fraud and the court case associated with it was regularly reported and written about in the Calcutta Magazine and Monthly Register as well as The Asiatic Journal and Monthly Register for British India and Its Dependencies.

== See also ==
- Nagarwala case
