= Transfer pricing =

Rules and methods for pricing transactions between enterprises under common ownership

Transfer pricing refers to the rules and methods for pricing transactions within and between enterprises under common ownership or control. Because of the potential for cross-border controlled transactions to distort taxable income, tax authorities in many countries can adjust intragroup transfer prices that differ from what would have been charged by unrelated enterprises dealing at arm’s length (the arm’s-length principle). The OECD and World Bank recommend intragroup pricing rules based on the arm’s-length principle, and 19 of the 20 members of the G20 have adopted similar measures through bilateral treaties and domestic legislation, regulations, or administrative practice. Countries with transfer pricing legislation generally follow the OECD Transfer Pricing Guidelines for Multinational Enterprises and Tax Administrations in most respects, although their rules can differ on some important details.

Where adopted, transfer pricing rules allow tax authorities to adjust prices for most cross-border intragroup transactions, including transfers of tangible or intangible property, services, and loans. For example, a tax authority may increase a company’s taxable income by reducing the price of goods purchased from an affiliated foreign manufacturer or raising the royalty the company must charge its foreign subsidiaries for rights to use a proprietary technology or brand name. These adjustments are generally calculated using one or more of the transfer pricing methods specified in the OECD guidelines and are subject to judicial review or other dispute resolution mechanisms.

Although transfer pricing is sometimes inaccurately presented by commentators as a tax avoidance practice or technique (transfer mispricing), the term refers to a set of substantive and administrative regulatory requirements imposed by governments on certain taxpayers. However, aggressive intragroup pricing – especially for debt and intangibles – has played a major role in corporate tax avoidance, and it was one of the issues identified when the OECD released its base erosion and profit shifting (BEPS) action plan in 2013. The OECD’s 2015 final BEPS reports called for country-by-country reporting and stricter rules for transfers of risk and intangibles but recommended continued adherence to the arm’s-length principle. These recommendations have been criticized by many taxpayers and professional service firms for departing from established principles and by some academics and advocacy groups for failing to make adequate changes.

Transfer pricing should not be conflated with fraudulent trade mis-invoicing, which is a technique for concealing illicit transfers by reporting falsified prices on invoices submitted to customs officials. “Because they often both involve mispricing, many aggressive tax avoidance schemes by multinational corporations can easily be confused with trade misinvoicing. However, they should be regarded as separate policy problems with separate solutions,” according to Global Financial Integrity, a non-profit research and advocacy group focused on countering illicit financial flows.

== In general ==
Over sixty governments have adopted transfer pricing rules, which in almost all cases (with the notable exception of Kazakhstan) are based on the arm's-length principle. The rules of nearly all countries permit related parties to set prices in any manner, but permit the tax authorities to adjust those prices (for purposes of computing tax liability) where the prices charged are outside an arm's length range. Most, if not all, governments permit adjustments by the tax authority even where there is no intent to avoid or evade tax. The rules generally require that market level, functions, risks, and terms of sale of unrelated party transactions or activities be reasonably comparable to such items with respect to the related party transactions or profitability being tested.

Adjustment of prices is generally made by adjusting taxable income of all involved related parties within the jurisdiction, as well as adjusting any withholding or other taxes imposed on parties outside the jurisdiction. Such adjustments are generally made after filing of tax returns. For example, if Bigco US charges Bigco Germany for a machine, either the U.S. or German tax authorities may adjust the price upon examination of the respective tax return. Following an adjustment, the taxpayer generally is allowed (at least by the adjusting government) to make payments to reflect the adjusted prices.

Most systems allow use of transfer pricing multiple methods, where such methods are appropriate and are supported by reliable data, to test related party prices. Among the commonly used methods are comparable uncontrolled prices, cost-plus, resale price or markup, and profitability based methods. Many systems differentiate methods of testing goods from those for services or use of property due to inherent differences in business aspects of such broad types of transactions. Some systems provide mechanisms for sharing or allocation of costs of acquiring assets (including intangible assets) among related parties in a manner designed to reduce tax controversy. Most governments have granted authorization to their tax authorities to adjust prices charged between related parties. Many such authorizations, including those of the United States, United Kingdom, Canada, and Germany, allow domestic as well as international adjustments. Some authorizations apply only internationally.

In addition, most systems recognize that an arm's length price may not be a particular price point but rather a range of prices. Some systems provide measures for evaluating whether a price within such range is considered arm's length, such as the interquartile range used in U.S. regulations. Significant deviation among points in the range may indicate lack of reliability of data. Reliability is generally considered to be improved by use of multiple year data.

Most rules require that the tax authorities consider actual transactions between parties, and permit adjustment only to actual transactions. Multiple transactions may be aggregated or tested separately, and testing may use multiple year data. In addition, transactions whose economic substance differs materially from their form may be recharacterized under the laws of many systems to follow the economic substance.

Transfer pricing adjustments have been a feature of many tax systems since the 1930s. The United States led the development of detailed, comprehensive transfer pricing guidelines with a White Paper in 1988 and proposals in 1990–1992, which ultimately became regulations in 1994. In 1995, the OECD issued its transfer pricing guidelines which it expanded in 1996 and 2010. The two sets of guidelines are broadly similar and contain certain principles followed by many countries. The OECD guidelines have been formally adopted by many European Union countries with little or no modification.

== Comparability ==
Most rules provide standards for when unrelated party prices, transactions, profitability or other items are considered sufficiently comparable in testing related party items. Such standards typically require that data used in comparisons be reliable and that the means used to compare produce a reliable result. The U.S. and OECD rules require that reliable adjustments must be made for all differences (if any) between related party items and purported comparables that could materially affect the condition being examined. Where such reliable adjustments cannot be made, the reliability of the comparison is in doubt. Comparability of tested prices with uncontrolled prices is generally considered enhanced by use of multiple data. Transactions not undertaken in the ordinary course of business generally are not considered to be comparable to those taken in the ordinary course of business. Among the factors that must be considered in determining comparability are:

- the contractual terms of the transaction, either formalized in written contract or not;
- the functions performed by each of the parties to the transaction taking into account assets used and risks assumed (so-called Functions, Assets, and Risks Analysis or FAR Analysis);
- the characteristics of property transferred or services provided, as difference in quality or the extent of service may affect price;
- the economic circumstances of the parties and of the market in which the parties operate, e.g. the geographic location, the extent of competition, and consumer purchasing power may result in different pricing even for the same goods and services; and
- the business strategies pursued by the parties, e.g. start-ups and mature businesses may have different pricing strategy, whether to focus on customer acquisition or profitability.

=== Nature of property or services ===
Comparability is best achieved where identical items are compared. However, in some cases it is possible to make reliable adjustments for differences in the particular items, such as differences in features or quality. For example, gold prices might be adjusted based on the weight of the actual gold (one ounce of 10 carat gold would be half the price of one ounce of 20 carat gold).

=== Functions and risks ===
Buyers and sellers may perform different functions related to the exchange and undertake different risks. For example, a seller of a machine may or may not provide a warranty. The price a buyer would pay will be affected by this difference. Among the functions and risks that may impact prices are:

- Product development
- Manufacturing and assembly
- Marketing and advertising
- Transportation and warehousing
- Credit risk
- Product obsolescence risk
- Market and entrepreneurial risks
- Collection risk
- Financial and currency risks
- Company- or industry-specific items

=== Terms of sale ===
Manner and terms of sale may have a material impact on price. For example, buyers will pay more if they can defer payment and buy in smaller quantities. Terms that may impact price include payment timing, warranty, volume discounts, duration of rights to use of the product, form of consideration, etc.

=== Market level, economic conditions and geography ===
Goods, services, or property may be provided to different levels of buyers or users: producer to wholesaler, wholesaler to wholesaler, wholesaler to retailer, or for ultimate consumption. Market conditions, and thus prices, vary greatly at these levels. In addition, prices may vary greatly between different economies or geographies. For example, a head of cauliflower at a retail market will command a vastly different price in unelectrified rural India than in Tokyo. Buyers or sellers may have different market shares that allow them to achieve volume discounts or exert sufficient pressure on the other party to lower prices. Where prices are to be compared, the putative comparables must be at the same market level, within the same or similar economic and geographic environments, and under the same or similar conditions.

=== Testing of prices ===
Tax authorities generally examine prices actually charged between related parties to determine whether adjustments are appropriate. Such examination is by comparison (testing) of such prices to comparable prices charged among unrelated parties. Such testing may occur only on examination of tax returns by the tax authority, or taxpayers may be required to conduct such testing themselves in advance of filing tax returns. Such testing requires a determination of how the testing must be conducted, referred to as a transfer pricing method.

==== Best method rule ====
Some systems give preference to a specific method of testing prices. OECD and U.S. systems, however, provide that the method used to test the appropriateness of related party prices should be that method that produces the most reliable measure of arm's length results. This is often known as a "best method" rule. Factors to be considered include comparability of tested and independent items, reliability of available data and assumptions under the method, and validation of the results of the method by other methods.

==== Comparable uncontrolled price (CUP) method ====
The comparable uncontrolled price (CUP) method is a traditional method that determines the arm's-length price using the prices charged in comparable transactions between unrelated parties. In principle, the OECD and most countries that follow the OECD guidelines consider the CUP method to be the most direct method, provided that any differences between the controlled and uncontrolled transactions have no material effect on price or their effects can be estimated and corresponding price adjustments can be made. Adjustments may be appropriate where the controlled and uncontrolled transactions differ only in volume or terms; for example, an interest adjustment could be applied where the only difference is time for payment (e.g., 30 days vs. 60 days). For undifferentiated products such as commodities, price data for arm's-length transactions ("external comparables") between two or more other unrelated parties may be available. For other transactions, it may be possible to use comparable transactions ("internal comparables") between the controlled party and unrelated parties.

The criteria for reliably applying the CUP method are often impossible to satisfy for licenses and other transactions involving unique intangible property, requiring use of valuation methods based on profit projections.

==== Other transactional methods ====
Among other methods relying on actual transactions (generally between one tested party and third parties) and not indices, aggregates, or market surveys are:

- Cost-plus (C+) method: goods or services provided to unrelated parties are consistently priced at actual cost plus a fixed markup. Testing is by comparison of the markup percentages.
- Resale price method (RPM): goods are regularly offered by a seller or purchased by a retailer to/from unrelated parties at a standard "list" price less a fixed discount. Testing is by comparison of the discount percentages.
- Gross margin method: similar to resale price method, recognised in a few systems.

==== Profit-based methods ====
Some methods of testing prices do not rely on actual transactions. Use of these methods may be necessary due to the lack of reliable data for transactional methods. In some cases, non-transactional methods may be more reliable than transactional methods because market and economic adjustments to transactions may not be reliable. These methods may include:

- Comparable profits method (CPM): profit levels of similarly situated companies in similar industries may be compared to an appropriate tested party. See U.S. rules below.
- Transactional net margin method (TNMM): while called a transactional method, the testing is based on profitability of similar businesses. See OECD guidelines below.
- Profit split method: total enterprise profits are split in a formulary manner based on econometric analyses.

CPM and TNMM have a practical advantage in ease of implementation. Both methods rely on microeconomic analysis of data rather than specific transactions. These methods are discussed further with respect to the U.S. and OECD systems.

Two methods are often provided for splitting profits: comparable profit split and residual profit split. The former requires that profit split be derived from the combined operating profit of uncontrolled taxpayers whose transactions and activities are comparable to the transactions and activities being tested. The residual profit split method requires a two step process: first profits are allocated to routine operations, then the residual profit is allocated based on nonroutine contributions of the parties. The residual allocation may be based on external market benchmarks or estimation based on capitalised costs.

==== Tested party and profit level indicator ====
Where testing of prices occurs on other than a purely transactional basis, such as CPM or TNMM, it may be necessary to determine which of the two related parties should be tested. Testing is to be done of that party testing of which will produce the most reliable results. Generally, this means that the tested party is that party with the most easily compared functions and risks. Comparing the tested party's results to those of comparable parties may require adjustments to results of the tested party or the comparables for such items as levels of inventory or receivables.

Testing requires determination of what indication of profitability should be used. This may be net profit on the transaction, return on assets employed, or some other measure. Reliability is generally improved for TNMM and CPM by using a range of results and multiple year data. this is based on circumstances of the relevant countries.

=== Intangible property issues ===
Valuable intangible property tends to be unique. Often there are no comparable items. The value added by use of intangibles may be represented in prices of goods or services, or by payment of fees (royalties) for use of the intangible property. Licensing of intangibles thus presents difficulties in identifying comparable items for testing. However, where the same property is licensed to independent parties, such license may provide comparable transactional prices. The profit split method specifically attempts to take value of intangibles into account.

=== Services ===
Enterprises may engage related or unrelated parties to provide services they need. Where the required services are available within a multinational group, there may be significant advantages to the enterprise as a whole for components of the group to perform those services. Two issues exist with respect to charges between related parties for services: whether services were actually performed which warrant payment, and the price charged for such services. Tax authorities in most major countries have, either formally or in practice, incorporated these queries into their examination of related party services transactions.

There may be tax advantages obtained for the group if one member charges another member for services, even where the member bearing the charge derives no benefit. To combat this, the rules of most systems allow the tax authorities to challenge whether the services allegedly performed actually benefit the member charged. The inquiry may focus on whether services were indeed performed as well as who benefited from the services. For this purpose, some rules differentiate stewardship services from other services. Stewardship services are generally those that an investor would incur for its own benefit in managing its investments. Charges to the investee for such services are generally inappropriate. Where services were not performed or where the related party bearing the charge derived no direct benefit, tax authorities may disallow the charge altogether.

Where the services were performed and provided benefit for the related party bearing a charge for such services, tax rules also permit adjustment to the price charged. Rules for testing prices of services may differ somewhat from rules for testing prices charged for goods due to the inherent differences between provision of services and sale of goods. The OECD Guidelines provide that the provisions relating to goods should be applied with minor modifications and additional considerations. In the U.S., a different set of price testing methods is provided for services. In both cases, standards of comparability and other matters apply to both goods and services.

It is common for enterprises to perform services for themselves (or for their components) that support their primary business. Examples include accounting, legal, and computer services for those enterprises not engaged in the business of providing such services. Transfer pricing rules recognize that it may be inappropriate for a component of an enterprise performing such services for another component to earn a profit on such services. Testing of prices charged in such case may be referred to a cost of services or services cost method. Application of this method may be limited under the rules of certain countries, and is required in some countries e.g. Canada.

Where services performed are of a nature performed by the enterprise (or the performing or receiving component) as a key aspect of its business, OECD and U.S. rules provide that some level of profit is appropriate to the service performing component. Canada's rules do not permit such profit. Testing of prices in such cases generally follows one of the methods described above for goods. The cost-plus method, in particular, may be favored by tax authorities and taxpayers due to ease of administration.

=== Cost sharing ===
Multi-component enterprises may find significant business advantage to sharing the costs of developing or acquiring certain assets, particularly intangible assets. Detailed U.S. rules provide that members of a group may enter into a cost sharing agreement (CSA) with respect to costs and benefits from the development of intangible assets. OECD Guidelines provide more generalized suggestions to tax authorities for enforcement related to cost contribution agreements (CCAs) with respect to acquisition of various types of assets. Both sets of rules generally provide that costs should be allocated among members based on respective anticipated benefits. Inter-member charges should then be made so that each member bears only its share of such allocated costs. Since the allocations must inherently be made based on expectations of future events, the mechanism for allocation must provide for prospective adjustments where prior projections of events have proved incorrect. However, both sets of rules generally prohibit applying hindsight in making allocations.

A key requirement to limit adjustments related to costs of developing intangible assets is that there must be a written agreement in place among the members. Tax rules may impose additional contractual, documentation, accounting, and reporting requirements on participants of a CSA or CCA, which vary by country.

Generally, under a CSA or CCA, each participating member must be entitled to use some portion of rights developed pursuant to the agreement without further payments. Thus, a CCA participant should be entitled to use a process developed under the CCA without payment of royalties. Ownership of the rights need not be transferred to the participants. The division of rights is generally to be based on some observable measure, such as by geography.

Participants in CSAs and CCAs may contribute pre-existing assets or rights for use in the development of assets. Such contribution may be referred to as a platform contribution. Such contribution is generally considered a deemed payment by the contributing member, and is itself subject to transfer pricing rules or special CSA rules.

A key consideration in a CSA or CCA is what costs development or acquisition costs should be subject to the agreement. This may be specified under the agreement, but is also subject to adjustment by tax authorities.

In determining reasonably anticipated benefits, participants are forced to make projections of future events. Such projections are inherently uncertain. Further, there may exist uncertainty as to how such benefits should be measured. One manner of determining such anticipated benefits is to project respective sales or gross margins of participants, measured in a common currency, or sales in units.

Both sets of rules recognize that participants may enter or leave a CSA or CCA. Upon such events, the rules require that members make buy-in or buy-out payments. Such payments may be required to represent the market value of the existing state of development, or may be computed under cost recovery or market capitalization models.

=== Penalties and documentation ===
Some jurisdictions impose significant penalties relating to transfer pricing adjustments by tax authorities. These penalties may have thresholds for the basic imposition of penalty, and the penalty may be increased at other thresholds. For example, U.S. rules impose a 20% penalty where the adjustment exceeds US$5 million, increased to 40% of the additional tax where the adjustment exceeds US$20 million.

The rules of many countries require taxpayers to document that prices charged are within the prices permitted under the transfer pricing rules. Where such documentation is not timely prepared, penalties may be imposed, as above. Documentation may be required to be in place prior to filing a tax return in order to avoid these penalties. Documentation by a taxpayer need not be relied upon by the tax authority in any jurisdiction permitting adjustment of prices. Some systems allow the tax authority to disregard information not timely provided by taxpayers, including such advance documentation. India requires that documentation not only be in place prior to filing a return, but also that the documentation be certified by the chartered accountant preparing a company return.

== U.S. specific tax rules ==
U.S. transfer pricing rules are lengthy. They incorporate all of the principles above, using CPM (see below) instead of TNMM. U.S. rules specifically provide that a taxpayer's intent to avoid or evade tax is not a prerequisite to adjustment by the Internal Revenue Service, nor are nonrecognition provisions. The U.S. rules give no priority to any particular method of testing prices, requiring instead explicit analysis to determine the best method. U.S. comparability standards limit use of adjustments for business strategies in testing prices to clearly defined market share strategies, but permit limited consideration of location savings.

=== Comparable profits method ===
The Comparable Profits method (CPM) was introduced in the 1992 proposed regulations and has been a prominent feature of IRS transfer pricing practice since. Under CPM, the tested party's overall results, rather than its transactions, are compared with the overall results of similarly situated enterprises for whom reliable data is available. Comparisons are made for the profit level indicator that most reliably represents profitability for the type of business. For example, a sales company's profitability may be most reliably measured as a return on sales (pre-tax profit as a percent of sales).

CPM inherently requires lower levels of comparability in the nature of the goods or services. Further, data used for CPM generally can be readily obtained in the U.S. and many countries through public filings of comparable enterprises.

Results of the tested party or comparable enterprises may require adjustment to achieve comparability. Such adjustments may include effective interest adjustments for customer financing or debt levels, inventory adjustments, etc.

=== Cost plus and resale price issues ===
U.S. rules apply resale price method and cost-plus with respect to goods strictly on a transactional basis. Thus, comparable transactions must be found for all tested transactions in order to apply these methods. Industry averages or statistical measures are not permitted. Where a manufacturing entity provides contract manufacturing for both related and unrelated parties, it may readily have reliable data on comparable transactions. However, absent such in-house comparables, it is often difficult to obtain reliable data for applying cost-plus.

The rules on services expand cost-plus, providing an additional option to mitigate these data problems. Charges to related parties for services not in the primary business of either the tested party or the related party group are rebuttably presumed to be arm's length if priced at cost plus zero (the services cost method). Such services may include back-room operations (e.g., accounting and data processing services for groups not engaged in providing such services to clients), product testing, or a variety of such non-integral services. This method is not permitted for manufacturing, reselling, and certain other services that typically are integral to a business.

U.S. rules also specifically permit shared services agreements. Under such agreements, various group members may perform services which benefit more than one member. Prices charged are considered arm's length where the costs are allocated in a consistent manner among the members based on reasonably anticipated benefits. For instance, shared services costs may be allocated among members based on a formula involving expected or actual sales or a combination of factors.

=== Terms between parties ===
Under U.S. rules, actual conduct of the parties is more important than contractual terms. Where the conduct of the parties differs from terms of the contract, the IRS has authority to deem the actual terms to be those needed to permit the actual conduct.

=== Adjustments ===
U.S. rules require that the IRS may not adjust prices found to be within the arm's length range. Where prices charged are outside that range, prices may be adjusted by the IRS unilaterally to the midpoint of the range. The burden of proof that a transfer pricing adjustment by the IRS is incorrect is on the taxpayer unless the IRS adjustment is shown to be arbitrary and capricious. However, the courts have generally required both taxpayers and the IRS to demonstrate their facts where agreement is not reached.

=== Documentation and penalties ===
If the IRS adjusts prices by more than $5 million or 10 percent of the taxpayer’s gross receipts, penalties apply. The penalty is 20% of the amount of the tax adjustment, increased to 40% at a higher threshold.

This penalty may be avoided only if the taxpayer maintains contemporaneous documentation meeting requirements in the regulations, and provides such documentation to the IRS within 30 days of IRS request. If documentation is not provided at all, the IRS may make adjustments based on any information it has available. Contemporaneous means the documentation existed with 30 days of filing the taxpayer's tax return. Documentation requirements are quite specific, and generally require a best method analysis and detailed support for the pricing and methodology used for testing such pricing. To qualify, the documentation must reasonably support the prices used in computing tax.

=== Commensurate with income standard ===
U.S. tax law requires that the foreign transferee/user of intangible property (patents, processes, trademarks, know-how, etc.) will be deemed to pay to a controlling transferor/developer a royalty commensurate with the income derived from using the intangible property. This applies whether such royalty is actually paid or not. This requirement may result in withholding tax on deemed payments for use of intangible property in the U.S.

== OECD specific tax rules ==
OECD guidelines are voluntary for member nations. Some nations have adopted the guidelines almost unchanged. Terminology may vary between adopting nations, and may vary from that used above.

OECD guidelines give priority to transactional methods, described as the "most direct way" to establish comparability. The Transactional Net Margin Method and Profit Split methods are used either as methods of last resort or where traditional transactional methods cannot be reliably applied. CUP is not given priority among transactional methods in OECD guidelines. The Guidelines state, "It may be difficult to find a transaction between independent enterprises that is similar enough to a controlled transaction such that no differences have a material effect on price." Thus, adjustments are often required to either tested prices or uncontrolled process.

=== Comparability standards ===
OECD rules permit consideration of business strategies in determining if results or transactions are comparable. Such strategies include market penetration, expansion of market share, cost or location savings, etc. Other comparability elements which are required to be considered when undertaking transfer pricing study include contractual terms, characteristics of the goods or services under the transfer pricing study and the overall economic circumstances.

=== Transactional net margin method ===
The transactional net margin method (TNMM) compares the net profitability of a transaction, or group or aggregation of transactions, to that of another transaction, group or aggregation. Under TNMM, use of actual, verifiable transactions is given strong preference. However, in practice TNMM allows making computations for company-level aggregates of transactions. Thus, TNMM may in some circumstances function like U.S. CPM.

=== Terms ===
Contractual terms and transactions between parties are to be respected under OECD rules unless both the substance of the transactions differs materially from those terms and following such terms would impede tax administration.

=== Adjustments ===
OECD rules generally do not permit tax authorities to make adjustments if prices charged between related parties are within the arm's length range. Where prices are outside such range, the prices may be adjusted to the most appropriate point. The burden of proof of the appropriateness of an adjustment is generally on the tax authority.

=== Documentation ===
OECD Guidelines do not provide specific rules on the nature of taxpayer documentation. Such matters are left to individual member nations.

== EU ==
In 2002, the European Union created the EU Joint Transfer Pricing Forum. The Communication on "Tax and Development – Cooperating with Developing Countries in Promoting Good Governance in Tax Matters‟, COM (2010) 163 final, highlighted the need to support developing countries' capacity in mobilizing domestic resources for development in line with the principles of good governance in taxation. In this context, PwC prepared the report Transfer pricing and developing countries.

Many EU countries are currently implementing the OECD Guidelines for Transfer Pricing. The latest adopter is Cyprus which issued a ruling in 2017 for financial arrangements.

== China specific tax rules ==
Prior to 2009, China generally followed OECD Guidelines. New guidelines were announced by the State Administration of Taxation (SAT) in March 2008 and issued in January 2009. These guidelines differed materially in approach from those in other countries in two principal ways: 1) they were guidelines issued instructing field offices how to conduct transfer pricing examinations and adjustments, and 2) factors to be examined differed by transfer pricing method. The guidelines covered:

- Administrative matters
- Required taxpayer filings and documentation
- General transfer pricing principles, including comparability
- Guidelines on how to conduct examinations
- Advance pricing and cost sharing agreement administration
- Controlled foreign corporation examinations
- Thin capitalization
- General anti-avoidance

On September 17, 2015, the SAT released a revised draft version of the "Implementation Measures for Special Tax Adjustment (Circular 2)," which replaced the previous 2009 guidelines. Three new sections were introduced under the revised draft: monitoring and management, intangible transactions/intra-group services and a new approach to transfer pricing documentation.

=== Documentation ===
Under the 2009 Circular, taxpayers must disclose related party transactions when filing tax returns. In addition, the circular provides for a three-tier set of documentation and reporting standards, based on the aggregate amount of intercompany transactions. Taxpayers affected by the rules who engaged in intercompany transactions under RMB 20 million for the year were generally exempted from reporting, documentation, and penalties. Those with transactions exceeding RMB 200 million generally were required to complete transfer pricing studies in advance of filing tax returns. For taxpayers in the top tier, documentation must include a comparability analysis and justification for the transfer pricing method chosen.

The 2015 draft introduced an overhauled three-tiered standardized approach to transfer pricing documentation. The tiers vary in documentation content and include the master file, the local file, and the country-by-country report. The draft also requires companies involved with related-party service transactions, cost sharing agreements or thin capitalization to submit a so-called "Special File."

=== General principles ===
Chinese transfer pricing rules apply to transactions between a Chinese business and domestic and foreign related parties. A related party includes enterprises meeting one of eight different tests, including 25% equity ownership in common, overlapping boards or management, significant debt holdings, and other tests. Transactions subject to the guidelines include most sorts of dealings businesses may have with one another.

The Circular instructs field examiners to review taxpayer's comparability and method analyses. The method of analyzing comparability and what factors are to be considered varies slightly by type of transfer pricing analysis method. The guidelines for CUP include specific functions and risks to be analyzed for each type of transaction (goods, rentals, licensing, financing, and services). The guidelines for resale price, cost-plus, transactional net margin method, and profit split are short and very general.

=== Cost sharing ===
The China rules provide a general framework for cost sharing agreements. This includes a basic structure for agreements, provision for buy-in and exit payments based on reasonable amounts, minimum operating period of 20 years, and mandatory notification of the SAT within 30 days of concluding the agreement.

== Agreements between taxpayers and governments and dispute resolution ==
Tax authorities of most major countries have entered into unilateral or multilateral agreements between taxpayers and other governments regarding the setting or testing of related party prices. These agreements are referred to as advance pricing agreements or advance pricing arrangements (APAs). Under an APA, the taxpayer and one or more governments agree on the methodology used to test prices. APAs are generally based on transfer pricing documentation prepared by the taxpayer and presented to the government(s). Multilateral agreements require negotiations between the governments, conducted through their designated competent authority groups. The agreements are generally for some period of years, and may have retroactive effect. Most such agreements are not subject to public disclosure rules. Rules controlling how and when a taxpayer or tax authority may commence APA proceedings vary by jurisdiction.

== Economic theory ==
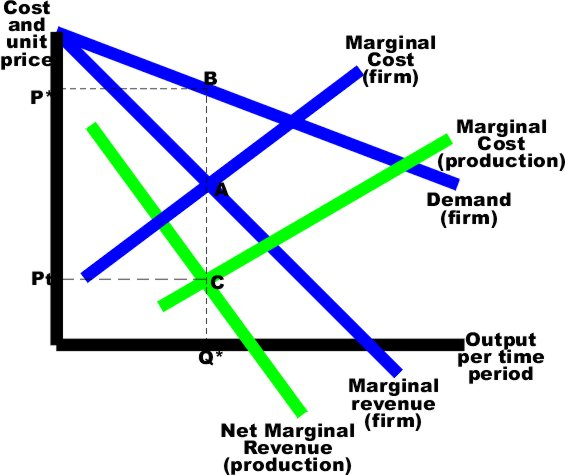
Transfer pricing with no external market

The discussion in this section explains an economic theory behind optimal transfer pricing with optimal defined as transfer pricing that maximizes overall firm profits in a non-realistic world with no taxes, no capital risk, no development risk, no externalities or any other frictions which exist in the real world. In practice a great many factors influence the transfer prices that are used by multinational corporations, including performance measurement, capabilities of accounting systems, import quotas, customs duties, VAT, taxes on profits, and (in many cases) simple lack of attention to the pricing.

From marginal price determination theory, the optimum level of output is that where marginal cost equals marginal revenue. That is to say, a firm should expand its output as long as the marginal revenue from additional sales is greater than their marginal costs. In the diagram that follows, this intersection is represented by point A, which will yield a price of P*, given the demand at point B.

When a firm is selling some of its product to itself, and only to itself (i.e. there is no external market for that particular transfer good), then the picture gets more complicated, but the outcome remains the same. The demand curve remains the same. The optimum price and quantity remain the same. But marginal cost of production can be separated from the firm's total marginal costs. Likewise, the marginal revenue associated with the production division can be separated from the marginal revenue for the total firm. This is referred to as the net marginal revenue in production (NMR) and is calculated as the marginal revenue from the firm minus the marginal costs of distribution.

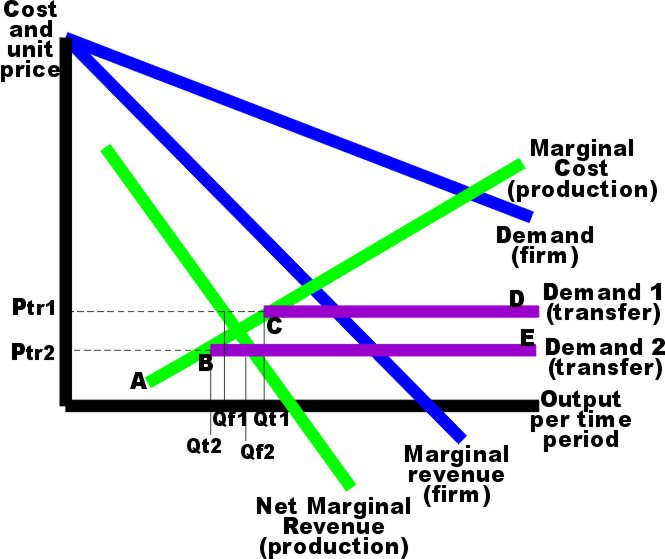
Transfer pricing with a competitive external market

It can be shown algebraically that the intersection of the firm's marginal cost curve and marginal revenue curve (point A) must occur at the same quantity as the intersection of the production division's marginal cost curve with the net marginal revenue from production (point C).

If the production division is able to sell the transfer good in a competitive market (as well as internally), then again both must operate where their marginal costs equal their marginal revenue, for profit maximization. Because the external market is competitive, the firm is a price taker and must accept the transfer price determined by market forces (their marginal revenue from transfer and demand for transfer products becomes the transfer price). If the market price is relatively high (as in Ptr1 in the next diagram), then the firm will experience an internal surplus (excess internal supply) equal to the amount Qt1 minus Qf1. The actual marginal cost curve is defined by points A,C,D.

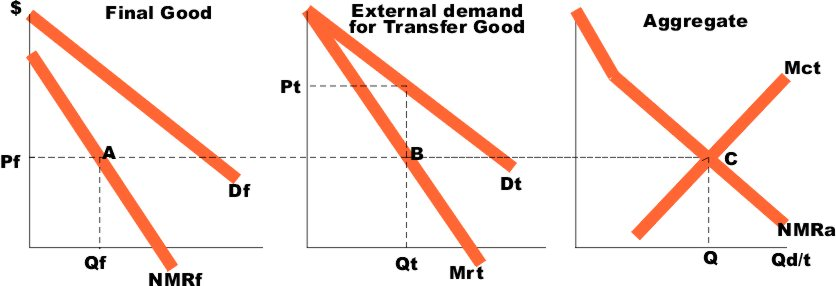
Transfer pricing with an imperfect external market

If the firm is able to sell its transfer goods in an imperfect market, then it need not be a price taker. There are two markets each with its own price (Pf and Pt in the next diagram). The aggregate market is constructed from the first two. That is, point C is a horizontal summation of points A and B (and likewise for all other points on the net marginal revenue curve (NMRa)). The total optimum quantity (Q) is the sum of Qf plus Qt.

== Alternative approaches to profit allocation ==
A frequently-proposed alternative to arm's-length principle-based transfer pricing rules is formulary apportionment, under which corporate profits are allocated according to objective metrics of activity such as sales, employees, or fixed assets. Some countries (including Canada and the United States) allocate taxing rights among their political subdivisions in this way, and it has recommended by the European Commission for use within the European Union. According to the amicus curiae brief, filed by the attorneys general of Alaska, Montana, New Hampshire, and Oregon in support of the state of California in the U.S. Supreme Court case of Barclays Bank PLC v. Franchise Tax Board, the formulary apportionment method, which is also known as the unitary apportionment method, has at least three major advantages over the separate accounting system when applied to multi-jurisdictional businesses. First, the unitary method captures the added wealth and value resulting from economic interdependencies of multistate and multinational corporations through their functional integration, centralization of management, and economies of scale. A unitary business also benefits from more intangible values shared among its constituent parts, such as reputation, good will, customers and other business relationships. See, e.g., Mobil, 445 U.S. at 438–40; Container, 463 U.S. at 164–65.

Separate accounting, with its emphasis on carving out of the overall business only income from sources within a single state, ignores the value attributable to the integrated nature of the business. Yet, to a large degree, the wealth, power, and profits of the world's large multinational enterprises are attributable to the very fact that they are integrated, unitary businesses. Hellerstein Treatise, P8.03 at 8-32.n9 As one commentator has explained: To believe that multinational corporations do not maintain an advantage over independent corporations operating within a similar business sphere is to ignore the economic and political strength of the multinational giants. By attempting to treat those businesses which are in fact unitary as independent entities, separate accounting "operates in a universe of pretense; as in Alice in Wonderland, it turns reality into fancy and then pretends it is the real world".

Because countries impose different corporate tax rates, a corporation that has a goal of minimizing the overall taxes to be paid will set transfer prices to allocate more of the worldwide profit to lower tax countries. Many countries attempt to impose penalties on corporations if the countries consider that they are being deprived of taxes on otherwise taxable profit. However, since the participating countries are sovereign entities, obtaining data and initiating meaningful actions to limit tax avoidance is hard. A publication of the Organisation for Economic Co-operation and Development (OECD) states, "Transfer prices are significant for both taxpayers and tax administrations because they determine in large part the income and expenses, and therefore taxable profits, of associated enterprises in different tax jurisdictions."

== See also ==
- Base erosion and profit shifting
- Corporate haven
- Double Irish arrangement
- Funds transfer pricing
- Ireland as a tax haven

== Reading and overall reference list ==
International:

- Wittendorff, Jens: Transfer Pricing and the Arm's Length Principle in International Tax Law, 2010, Kluwer Law International, ISBN 90-411-3270-8.

Canada:

- Section 247 of the Income Tax Act (Canada)
- Information Circular 87-2R - International Transfer Pricing (1999)
- Information Circular 94-4R - International Transfer Pricing: Advance Pricing Arrangements (APAs) (2001)
- TPM 07 - Referrals to the Transfer Pricing Review Committee (2005)
- TPM 09 - Reasonable efforts under section 247 of the Income Tax Act (2006)

China: Major international accounting and law firms have published summaries of the guidelines. See their web sites.

India:

- Income Tax Department's compilation of Transfer Pricing Rules
- Domestic Transfer Pricing Overview

Nigeria:

- Transfer Pricing Regulations 2012 - Federal Inland Revenue Service

OECD:

- Transfer Pricing Guidelines for Multinational Enterprises and Tax Administrations. OECD Transfer Pricing Guidelines for Multinational Enterprises and Tax Administrations. OECD Publishing, Paris. July 2010. doi:10.1787/tpg-2010-en. ISBN 9789264090330.
- Transfer Pricing Country Profiles, a useful cross reference to guidance in each member country
- Base Erosion and Profit Shifting (BEPS), OECD landing page
- Aligning Transfer Pricing Outcomes with Value Creation, Actions 8-10 - 2015 Final Reports. OECD/G20 Base Erosion and Profit Shifting Project. OECD Publishing, Paris. October 2015. doi:10.1787/9789264241244-en. ISBN 9789264241237.
- Transfer Pricing Documentation and Country-by-Country Reporting, Action 13 - 2015 Final Reports. OECD/G20 Base Erosion and Profit Shifting Project. OECD Publishing, Paris. October 2015. doi:10.1787/9789264241480-en. ISBN 9789264241466.

Russian Federation:

- Tax Code of Russian Federation

United Kingdom:

- Transfer pricing statute: ICTA88/Sch 28AA
- HMRC International Manual Transfer Pricing INTM430000

United Nations

- Practical Manual on Transfer Pricing for Developing Countries (2013) (PDF).

United States:

- Law: 26 USC 482
- Regulations: 26 CFR 1.482-0 through 9
- IRS view on OECD rules: https://www.irs.gov/pub/irs-apa/apa_training_oecd_guidelines.pdf
- APA Procedure: Rev. Proc. 2008-31
- Feinschreiber, Robert: Transfer Pricing Methods, 2004, ISBN 978-0-471-57360-9
- Parker, Kenneth and Levey, Marc: Tax Director's Guide to International Transfer Pricing, 2008, ISBN 978-1-60231-001-8
- Services by Thompson RIA and Wolters Kluwer: search "transfer pricing" on their websites
