= Pragun Akhil Jindal =

Indian author, speaker and entrepreneur (born 1996)

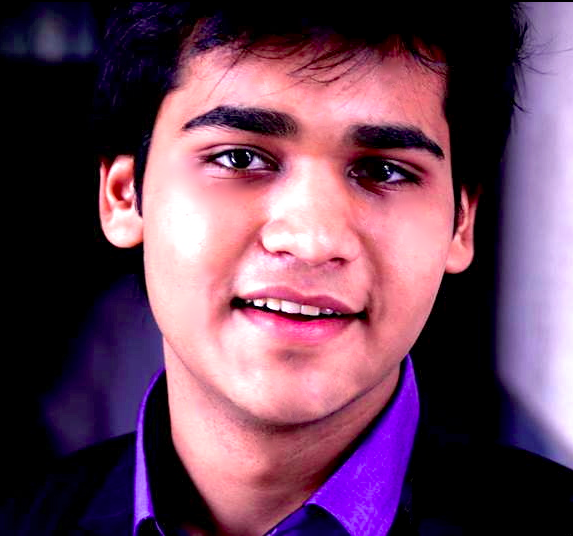
- Born: 13 September 1996 (age 30); New Delhi, India
- Education: The Shri Ram School, Delhi University, University Of Buckingham
- Notable work: The Black White & Grey
- Father: Dr. CA Akhil Jindal
- Website: www.pragunjindal.com

Pragun Akhil Jindal (born 13 September 1996) is an Indian author, speaker and entrepreneur. He is noted for his work about black money and finance in the Indian economic diaspora.

Jindal has been writing since the age of 16 and has presented papers, articles and solutions in various fields like black money, curbing tax evasion, and youth financial literacy. He wrote The Black White & Grey : Recoloring The Rupiah, contributed to The Smart Artist a production by Artbuzz Studios which is a guide for creative professionals, co-founded of Rupyo (one of India’s first Earned Wage Access Applications) and is the third-generation legacy Tax and Regulatory Partner at Jindal & Co. Chartered Accountants, who specialize in income tax, enforcement directorate and DRI.

== The Black White & Grey ==
The Black White & Grey: Recoloring The Rupiah was e-launched by HRD Minister Prakash Javadekar.

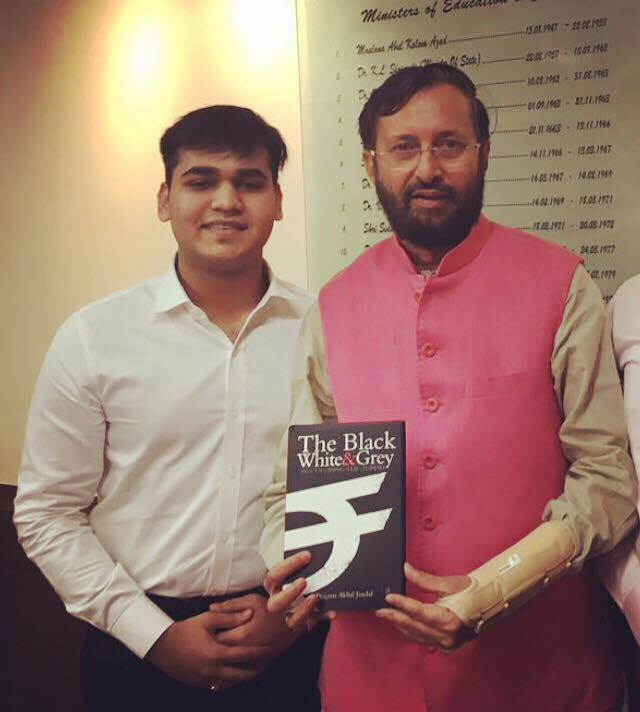
Pragun Jindal with Prakash Javadekar holding his book

The book was authored by Pragun Jindal and published by Money Worries. It looks at black money in India and seeks ways to curb it.

Jindal depicts a world where the rich get richer staying on the dark side while the poor are marginalized. There are tricks to keep the cover of darkness intact and every time an effort is made to lift the veil, the tricks become sharper. This book looks at the world that thrives in the shadows, fueled by money that exchanges hands in the dark and never gets reported.

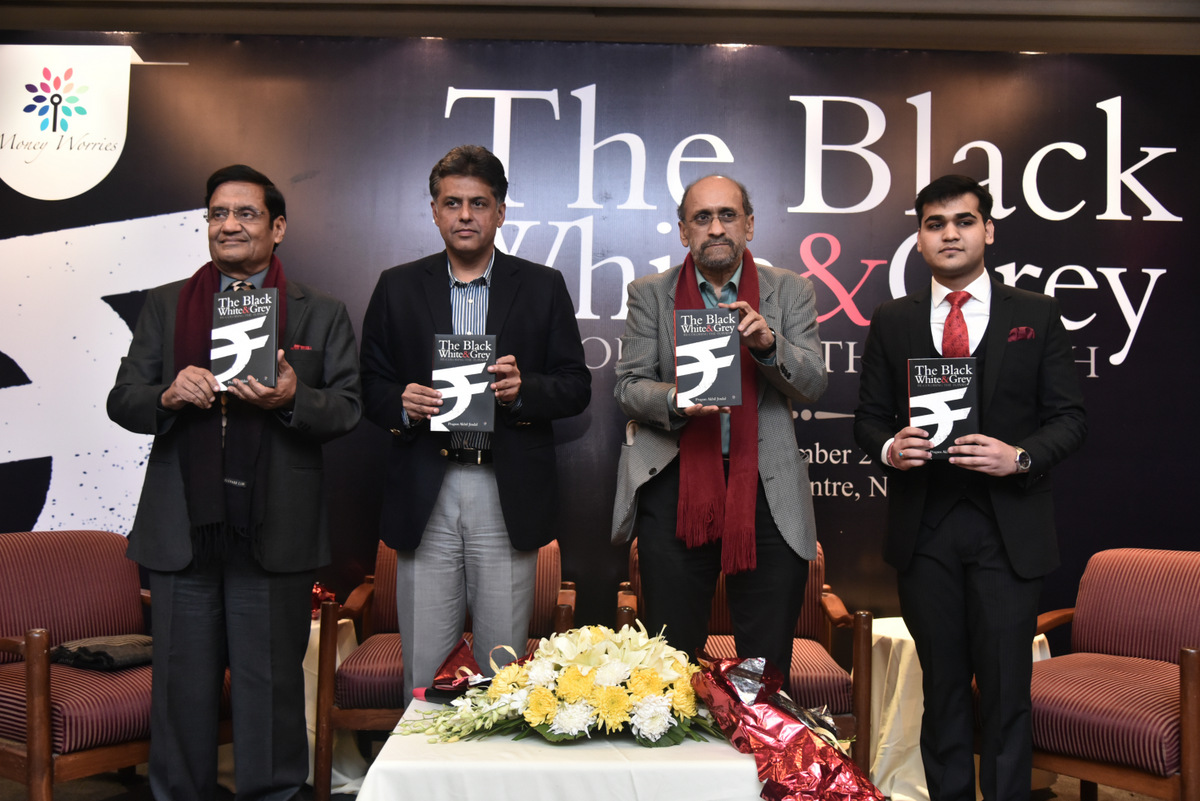
The Black White & Grey being launched at Indian Habitat Centre.

Senior Congress Leader Manish Tewari, Former Central Board of Direct Taxes Chief Sudhir Chandra and political commentator Paranjoy Guha Thakurta formally launched the book on December 13, 2016 which attempts to debunk "a lot of lies, unknown facts and baseless rumours about Black Money". "A delinquent like poverty only affects the poor, unemployment affects those who are unemployed, alcoholism and drug abuse affect those who devour them, black money is a hitch which does not affect persons who amass 'black dough' but it affects the common man in the populace," said the author at the launch event held at India Habitat Centre in New Delhi.

== The Smart Artist ==
The Smart Artist is an Artbuzz Studios production and publication launched along- side the India Art Fair 202 to promote the Art-preneurs in India. The book aims at assisting 'Artrepreneurs' build a career as a holistic artist, providing guidance from industry professionals and experts designed to help artists grow as entrepreneurs. Pragun is a contributor in the book and deals with financial aspects in Art & Artists.

== Personal life ==
Jindal stays in New Delhi along with his parents and grandparents. He attended the Shri Ram School in New Delhi.

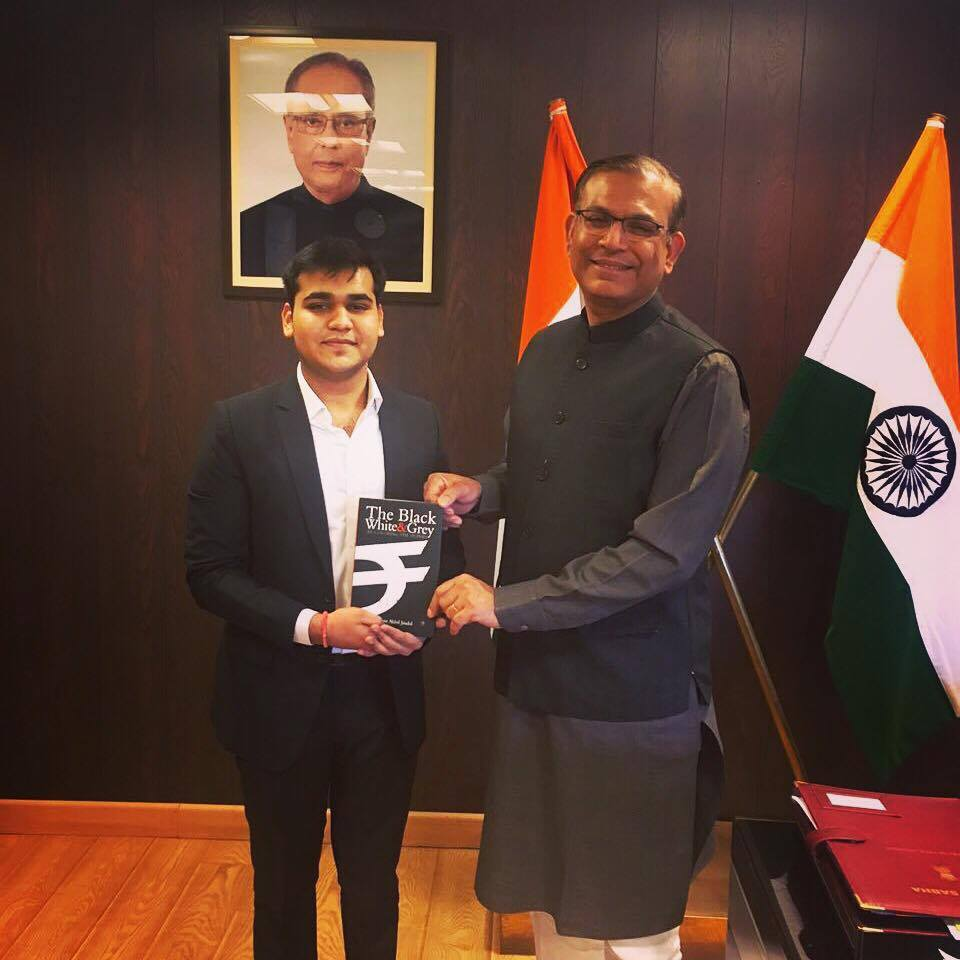
Shri Jayant Sinha MOS Civil Aviation with the author.

Jindal graduated from the University Of Delhi with a first class degree in Bachelor Of Commerce Gt (Honours) and LLB. He was conferred with a LL.M in International and Commercial Trade from the University of Buckingham. He majored in Finance, Tax and Accountancy.

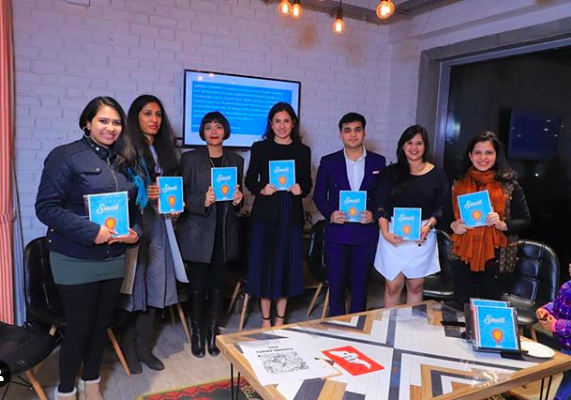
Pragun Jindal and other contributors at the launch of The Smart Artist

== Awards and recognition ==
- Jindal was the keynote speaker at the Times Nie Newsmakers Meet held at Manav Rachna University in 2017.
- Jindal has been invited to various platforms to portray his views on demonetisation and black money.
