= Transfer mispricing =

Method of tax evasion or fraud

Transfer mispricing, also known as transfer pricing manipulation or fraudulent transfer pricing, refers to trade between related parties at prices meant to manipulate markets or to deceive tax authorities. The legality of the process varies between tax jurisdictions; most regard it as a type of fraud or tax evasion.

Generally, if two independent, unrelated parties negotiate with one other for a financial transaction and eventually reach a price, a transaction in correct market price will take place. According to the arm's length principle, the price at which the transaction occurs is preferred for tax purposes, as it is a fair reflection of the value of the goods or services.

However, when the parties that negotiate a transaction are related, they may set an artificially lower price with the intention to minimise their taxes. Because of these tax benefits, transfer mispricing is favored by a majority of large enterprises.

== Examples ==
Assume company A, a multinational which produces a product in Africa and sells it in the United States, processes its produce through three subsidiary companies: X (in Africa), Y (in a tax haven, usually an offshore financial center) and Z (in the US), each of which acts under instruction from A. Company X sells its product to Company Y at an artificially low price, resulting in a low profit and a low tax for Company X in Africa. Company Y then sells the product to Company Z at an artificially high price, almost as high as the retail price at which Company Z then sells the final product in the US. As a result, Company Z also records a low profit and, therefore, a low tax. Most of the apparent profit is made by Company Y, even though it acts purely as a middleman without adding much (if any) value to the product (it is likely that the products never actually pass through the country Y, but are shipped directly from X to Z). Because Company Y operates in a tax haven, it pays very little tax, leading to increased profits for the parent Company A. Both jurisdictions of companies X and Z are deprived of tax income, which they would have been entitled to if the product had at each stage been traded at the market rate.

In the previous example it is not a coincidence that the selected country was African. Although the amount of empirical analysis about transfer pricing is quite small, it is clear that the amount of trade mispricing occurring in African exports is higher than that of the developed world, since in Africa there is insufficient implementation of OECD guidelines and generally less air-tight laws.

About 60% of capital flight from Africa is from improper transfer pricing. Such capital flight from the developing world is estimated at ten times the size of aid it receives and twice the debt service it pays. The African Union reports estimates that about 30% of Sub-Saharan Africa's GDP has been moved to tax havens. One tax analyst believed that if the money were paid, most of the continent would be "developed" by now.

Another example is company producing cars, which has its headquarters in Japan and a subsidiary in India. Suppose that Japanese operations have losses, whereas the Indian subsidiary has profits. Even though the Indian subsidiary shows profits, because of the purchases of a component from Japan parent company for an unreasonable high price, the profit of the Indian operations will come down. Therefore, its tax outgo will come down, which is benefits the company as a whole. Similarly, the loss of the Japanese firm declines, because of receiving this additional money for the component from Indian subsidiary. The result is that the company producing cars as a whole pays less taxes.

== Connection to rational asymmetric development ==
In general, there is some connection between globalization and concerns about unbalanced development, due to the fact that transfer mispricing has also contributed to rational asymmetric development, according to Asongu: “it refers to unfair practices of globalisation adopted by advanced nations to the detriment and impoverishment of less developed countries”.

Another natural and generalizing example of wrong pricing, which lay stress on rational asymmetric development and the fact that the pricing throughout countries incorrectly varies significantly explains Stiglitz : “The average European cow gets a subsidy of $2 a day; more than half of the people in the developing world live on less than that. It appears that it is better to be a cow in Europe than to be a poor person in a developing country…… Without subsidies, it would not pay for the United States to produce cotton; with them, the United States is, as we have noted, the world's largest cotton exporter”

== Avoiding transfer mispricing ==
This issue of prices, for which good and services are sold between the connected persons is addressed by the OECD Guidelines in accordance with international agreements to avoid double taxation. Since in the second half of the 20th century, transfer mispricing had started to become a major problem and therefore, the OECD (Organisation for Economic Co-operation and Development) needed to unify regulatory frameworks to efficiently combat this phenomenon. Also, since this issue is concerning various countries, it can only be solved by meticulous cooperation between countries, so the international agreements needed to be made to set forth regulatory guidelines.

Concerning this topic, OECD has newly in July 2017 published new consolidated version of the OECD Guidelines called OECD Transfer Pricing Guidelines for Multinational Enterprises and Tax Administrations 2017, which includes the revised guidance on safe harbours adopted in 2013, as well as some corrections of the BEPS Actions Plan. The keystone of this OECD Guideline is the Arm's Length Principle, defined in the Article 9 of the OECD Model Tax Convention as "conditions are made or imposed between the two enterprises in their commercial or financial relations which differ from those which would be made between independent enterprises, then any profits which would, but for those conditions, have accrued to one of the enterprises, but, by reason of those conditions, have not so accrued, may be included in the profits of that enterprise and taxed accordingly."

Governments have also devised many measures to avoid the misuse of transfer pricing thanks to these OECD publications, which outline several methods that may be used to assess legitimacy of a given transaction. Exactly there are 5 extensively used methods: The Comparable Uncontrolled Price (CUP) method, The Resale Price method (RPM), The Cost Plus (C+) method, The Profit Split Method (PSM) and The Transactional Net Margin Method (TNMM). The Transactional Net Margin Method is the most commonly used method to verify the correctness of transfer pricing to make sure that it is not case of transport mispricing. One advantage of this method is that all information necessary for application of this method are freely available from all public and commercial databases.

Solutions include corporate “country-by-country reporting” where corporations disclose activities in each country and thereby prohibit the use of tax havens where real economic activity occurs. Progress is being made in this direction, as documented on a map. Whereas appropriate transfer pricing of tangible goods can be established by comparison with prices charged for similar goods to unrelated parties, transfer pricing of intangible goods, products of intellectual efforts, rarely has comparable equivalents. Transfer prices then have to be established based on expectations of future income. Mispricing is rife. Khadija Sharife and John Grobler, writing for the World Policy Journal, exposed $3.5 billion minimum in transfer mispricing of African diamonds from Angola and DRC, through the use of intra-company valuation, shell companies and tax havens, notably Dubai and Switzerland.

In Sweden (a high-tax country) it was popular in 2005–2010 to have "interest loops", where simple loans or investments were placed between a Swedish company and a tax haven company in both directions, and where the interest rate was mispriced to create a tax deduction in Sweden. This loophole was closed in 2013.

== See also ==
- Tax haven
- Transfer pricing
- Base erosion and profit shifting
