= Tamil Nadu Buildings (Lease and Rent Control) Act, 1960 =

Tamil Nadu Buildings (Lease and Rent Control) Act, 1960 is act of Government of Tamil Nadu. Tamil Nadu, a state in India, has an exclusive Rent Control Act where the state government has the exclusive jurisdiction to legislate on the subject.

== Provisions ==
- For Residential building, Annual rent can be 6 to 9 per cent of total cost of the building at the time construction.
- For Non Residential building, Annual rent 9 to 12 per cent of total cost of the building at the time construction.
- Maintenance charges can be 10 per cent of the rent.
- Tenant need not pay the owner for property tax.
- Additional 15% rent for a furnished house.

== See also ==
- Tamil Nadu Government Laws & Rules
- Jural relationship
