= International Cyanide Management Code =

- Full Name: International Cyanide Management Code For The Manufacture, Transport and Use of Cyanide In The Production of Gold
- Established: 2002
- Number of Signatories: 215 (as of January 1, 2024)
- Number of Certified Operations: 281
- Number of Countries where Cyanide Code is Being Implemented: 48
- Headquarters: Washington, DC
- Website: http://www.cyanidecode.org/

The International Cyanide Management Code for the Manufacture, Transport and Use of Cyanide in the Production of Gold, commonly referred to as the Cyanide Code, is a voluntary program designed to assist the global gold and silver mining industries and the producers and transporters of cyanide used in gold and silver mining in improving cyanide management practices and to publicly demonstrate their compliance with the Cyanide Code through an independent and transparent process. The Cyanide Code is intended to reduce the potential exposure of workers and communities to harmful concentrations of cyanide‚ limit releases of cyanide to the environment‚ and enhance response actions in the event of an exposure or release.

The Cyanide Code was one of the earliest standards and certification programs developed for the minerals sector. Today, it is among the most established certification programs in the mining industry. As a result, the Cyanide Code has been used as a model in the development of other standards initiatives, including the Global Industry Standard on Tailings Management.

The program's audit process and the transparency of audit results set it apart from other voluntary industry programs.

== Cyanide in gold mining ==
Cyanide is a general term for a group of chemicals containing carbon and nitrogen. Cyanide compounds include both naturally occurring and human-made chemicals. In nature, cyanide is present naturally in plants including bitter almonds, apples, peaches, apricots, lima beans, barley, sorghum, flaxseed and bamboo shoots. Some scientists suggest that the reason why these plants contain cyanide, which can be toxic, is that evolution has designed them to discourage insects from feasting on them. Although cyanide can be toxic to humans, eating cyanide-containing foods generally is not harmful because cyanide is present in very low amounts, is often contained in seeds which are discarded, or is washed away when the food is prepared. Cyanide can be acutely toxic to humans, other mammals and aquatic species, as it interferes with oxygen utilization. Cyanide does not bioaccumulate, and a non-lethal dose is metabolized in the body. Cyanide is not carcinogenic, teratogenic or mutagenic.

Cyanide comes in many forms including hydrogen cyanide (HCN), cyanogen chloride (CNCl), and salts such as sodium cyanide (NaCN) or potassium cyanide (KCN). In manufacturing, cyanide is used to make paper, textiles, and plastics. Cyanide salts are used in metallurgy for electroplating, metal cleaning, and removing gold from its ore. Cyanide gas is used to exterminate pests and vermin in ships and buildings.

Cyanide is a basic building block for the chemical industry. About 80% of global cyanide production is used to synthesize a wide range of industrial organic chemicals such as nylon and acrylics.

It is estimated that less than 20% of manufactured cyanide is used in mineral processing in the form of sodium cyanide. Sodium cyanide has been used in gold mining since 1887 because it is one of only a few chemical reagents that will dissolve gold in water. This allows the efficient extraction of gold from low grade ore. Commercial gold mining operations use very dilute solutions of sodium cyanide, typically in the range of 0.01% and 0.05% cyanide (100 to 500 parts per million).

Cyanide should be strictly controlled on mine sites, and proper management requires that certain precautions be taken to limit worker exposure and to prevent chemical solutions containing cyanide from entering the environment. The most-used process of removing gold from ore is through leaching. In the leaching process, sodium cyanide is dissolved in water where, under mildly oxidizing conditions, it dissolves the gold contained in the crushed gold ore. The resultant gold-bearing solution is called 'pregnant solution.' Either zinc metal or activated carbon is then added to the pregnant solution to recover the gold by removing it from the solution. There are two main leaching methods for gold extraction using cyanide. The first is 'heap' leaching in which the dilute cyanide solution is sprayed on large piles or heaps of coarse gold ore. The solution percolates through the pile dissolving the gold and the pregnant solution is then collected. This method is mainly used for ore with lower concentrations of gold. The other method is 'vat' leaching in which the process is similar but the gold ore is finely ground and leaching takes place in a tank or vat. Vat leaching is used mainly for ores with higher concentrations of gold due to the cost of milling the ore to a very small particle size. Alternative lixiviant (leaching) chemicals to cyanide (for example thiourea, sodium bromide) have been investigated for many years, but they are generally less effective and/or economical than cyanide, and they also present environmental risks that can be greater than cyanide. Because cyanide is toxic if not properly handled, its use is highly regulated in most countries.

Despite regulatory and voluntary safeguards, however, some jurisdictions have banned its use in gold mining. These include Slovakia, the Czech Republic, Germany, and Hungary. Several provinces in Argentina also prohibit the use of cyanide in mining. In the U.S., the state of Montana has taken action to ban cyanide in gold production.

== History ==
Cyanide, a highly toxic chemical, has been the most widely used reagent for extracting gold from ore for the past century. The Cyanide Code grew out of the first-of-its-kind workshop of multi-stakeholders held in Paris in May, 2000 convened to consider developing a code of best practice for the use of cyanide in gold mining in response to a tailings spill from the Aural Mine at Baia Mare in Romania in January 2000. The meeting was co-hosted by The United Nations Environment Programme (UNEP) and the International Council on Metals and the Environment (now the International Council on Mining and Metals). Workshop participants were almost 40 representatives of such diverse organizations as the Worldwide Fund for Nature, the Mineral Policy Center (now Earthworks), the Sierra Club, and the World Gold Council, along with representation from the U.S. Environmental Protection Agency, the governments of Australia, France, Hungary, Romania, and the world's leading gold producers and cyanide producers.

As a result of the workshop, a multi-stakeholder steering committee was established to oversee development of a code of best practice for the management of cyanide used for gold recovery. The committee met five times over a 13-month period starting in late 2000, and each successive draft of the best practice document it produced was made available to the public on the UNEP web site with an open invitation for comments. The committee also solicited comments directly from 140 groups and individuals, including governments, NGOs, academics, consultants, industry, and financial institutions, and received 68 written responses and 15 stakeholder presentations at its meetings. In early 2002, the committee completed the International Cyanide Management Code for The Manufacture, Transport and Use of Cyanide In The Production of Gold.

As conceived by the steering committee, the Cyanide Code was more than a guide to best management practices for the use of cyanide in the production of gold. The Cyanide Code also addressed the safe manufacture and transport of the cyanide used in the gold industry. Further, although the program is voluntary, the Cyanide Code includes a process by which its implementation at gold mines and other facilities is verified by independent third-party professional auditors and audit results are made available to the public. The International Cyanide Management Institute (ICMI) was established in 2003 to oversee the Cyanide Code's implementation and verification, and by 2005, the administrative procedures, audit protocols and guidance documents necessary for full program implementation had been developed.

2015 marked the tenth year of implementation of the Cyanide Code globally.

In 2017, the International Cyanide Management Institute undertook a public consultation process to determine if the Cyanide Code should be extended to include primary silver mines, which is defined as an operation where silver is the main commodity produced. About 30% of the world's silver production comes from primary silver mines; the balance is produced as a co-product from polymetallic, base metal, or gold mines. The Institute solicited input from stakeholders on the proposal, including its advisability, policy or technical issues, and any other related matters. Following receipt of stakeholder comments, all of which were supportive of the change, ICMI's Board of Directors approved the program's expansion, effective January 1, 2017.

The Cyanide Code is supported by a suite of documents that provide guidance and instructions to participating operations in preparing for certification and to auditors in assessing compliance. They also provide information, instruction, and details on administrative requirements for participating companies and auditors. In 2019, ICMI initiated a process to undertake a comprehensive review and updating of the Cyanide Code's supporting documents following a public consultation. The objective of the review was four-fold: 1) accounting for changes in industry practices since initial development of the Cyanide Code and its supporting documents; 2) addressing gaps and "soft spots" in requirements for auditing and compliance; 3) clarification of procedures and guidance for compliance auditing and certification; and 4) making documents more "user friendly" by eliminating duplicate materials and discrepancies.

The process resulted in one new document being created, the Guidance for Use of the Cyanide Production Verification Protocol. The Guidance for Use of the Mining Operations Verification Protocol previously had been used as a surrogate to provide guidance for compliance of production facilities. This revisions process has also included consolidation of selected documents to reduce duplication and discrepancies and make materials easier to locate. Substantial revisions were made to 11 documents in this review and revisions process to improve clarity and for consistency both within and between documents. Information previously included in multiple documents were consolidated, where possible, into a single document. Documents used by operations in preparing for certification and used by auditors in evaluating compliance have been revised to account for ICMI's experience with Cyanide Code implementation, compliance issues, and evaluating audit reports over the past 14 years, as well as changes in industry practices since initial development of the Cyanide Code. ICMI released the revised program documentation in June 2021, and for purposes of audit compliance, the new program documentation was effective September 1, 2021.

== Signatories and certification ==
The Cyanide Code is a resource for any gold or silver mine, cyanide producer or cyanide transporter regarding best practices for cyanide management. A company that becomes a signatory to the Cyanide Code commits to implement its Principles and Standards of Practice at its operations and to demonstrate compliance by having their facilities audited against the Cyanide Code's Verification Protocols.

The first 14 Cyanide Code signatory companies were announced in November 2005. Since then, the number of companies participating in the program has substantially increased. As of January 1, 2024, the Cyanide Code had 214 signatory companies, with operations in 48 countries. These include 57 gold mining companies, 32 cyanide producers, and 137 cyanide transporters.

Gold and silver mines, cyanide production facilities, and cyanide transport operations owned by Cyanide Code signatory companies are certified through a transparent process using independent third-party professional auditors and technical experts meeting requirements established by ICMI for experience and expertise. The initial audit must be conducted within three years of the facility's owner becoming a signatory, and audits to evaluate continuing compliance are conducted on a three-year interval. Operations are certified in compliance with the Cyanide Code based on the auditors' findings, and a summary of the audit results, as well as the credentials of the auditors, are made available to the public on the Cyanide Code website. The program's transparency gives stakeholders the ability to judge the rigor of the audit process and the audit findings.

The Cyanide Code is being widely implemented in the gold mining sector. The global reach of the Cyanide Code is demonstrated by the signatory mining companies with participating operations in 32 countries account for the vast majority of the sodium cyanide used in the industrial gold and silver mining sectors. Another way of looking at the scale is to realize that better than half of the world's gold production by cyanidation at industrial mines is taking place under the conditions laid down by the Cyanide Code.

As of January 1, 2024, 358 operations were in the program, of which 281 operations were certified in compliance with the Cyanide Code, including 100 gold mines, 40 cyanide production facilities, and 141 cyanide transporters. Two hundred twenty-nine had been audited two or more times and found to have maintained compliance. Sixty operations have been certified five or more times representing 12 or more years of continuous compliance to the Cyanide Code.

In February 2022, ICMI announced the milestone achievement of the 1000th certification in the program's history.

== Stakeholder perspectives ==
The Cyanide Code has been recognized by the Group of Eight ("G8") as one of several certification systems that are suitable instruments for "increasing transparency and good governance in the extraction and processing of mineral raw materials." The G8 is an international forum for the governments of Canada, France, Germany, Italy, Japan, Russia, the United Kingdom and the United States. Article 85 of the G8's Summit Declaration, issued during its 2007 annual meeting, states the following:

"Certification systems can be a suitable instrument in appropriate cases for increasing transparency and good governance in the extraction and processing of mineral raw materials and to reduce environmental impacts, support the compliance with minimum social standards and resolutely counter illegal resource extraction. Therefore, we reaffirm our support for existing initiatives such as ... the International Cyanide Management Code, and encourage the adaptation of the respective principles of corporate social responsibility by those involved in the extraction and processing of mineral resources,"

The International Finance Corporation (IFC), a part of the World Bank that provides funding for mining projects, applies the Cyanide Code in lieu of its own requirements in its Environmental, Health and Safety (EHS) Guidelines for Mining. As a condition of its loans, IFC EHS Guidelines call on mines to use cyanide in a manner "consistent with the principles and standards of practice of the International Cyanide Management Code." The European Bank for Reconstruction and Development requires Cyanide Code compliance in their loan agreements to gold mines or otherwise encourage projects they fund that use cyanide to comply with the Cyanide Code.

Environment Canada's "Environmental Code of Practice for Metal Mines" cites the Cyanide Code as the guide for the environmentally responsible management of cyanide used in the production of both gold and base metals, and recommends that cyanide management planning and the transportation, storage, use and disposal of cyanide and cyanide-related materials be done "in a manner consistent with practices described in the International Cyanide Management Code."

The Australian National Industrial Chemicals' Notification and Assessment Scheme's 2010 evaluation of the risks posed by sodium cyanide characterizes the Cyanide Code as "It is an excellent initiative to lift international standards and demonstrate the environmental commitment of an operator, complementing state/territory legislative requirements.."

In a 2015 report commissioned by the Dutch Ministry of Foreign Affairs, the research firm Profundo noted that "The International Cyanide Management Code, to which all respectable mining companies subscribe, therefore governs not only the uses and storage of the chemical, but also its transport to a mine."

According to Benchmark Study of Environmental and Social Standards in Industrialised Precious Metals Mining produced by Solidaridad, an international network organization with more than 20 years of experience in creating fair and sustainable supply chains from producer to consumer the Cyanide Code offers "a good level of transparency as all of the Code's implementing documents are available to the public on the ICMI website." The Study also noted the Cyanide Code offers "rigorous and transparent verification of compliance, that there is "respect for the Code by operational staff and excellent emergency procedures."

In commenting on the stringent auditing process, a report titled Global Best Practices in Cyanide Management: The International Cyanide Management Code (ICMC) and Turkish Experience noted: "In summary, the ICMC is one of the most rigorous voluntary auditing benchmarks ever to be applied in any international industry. ICMC auditing protocols are exacting, detailed, and transparent, and third party auditors are held to a very high standard with respect to their independence, auditing capabilities, and technical experience."

The Mining Certification Evaluation Project's final report concluded that "third party certification schemes offer a credible means with which to assess and verify performance against agreed standards" and noted that "the Cyanide Code is a prominent example of an existing third-party certification scheme for the mining industry."

In an article in the Canadian Institute of Mining, Metallurgy and Petroleum May, 2015 magazine Kinross Gold Corporation's Vice President of Environmental Affairs, Dean Williams, concurred saying that the Cyanide Code has become the new industry standard. "Any responsible gold miner of any size that elects not to become certified is actually making a statement that is contrary to most of the industry."

Australian regulators have credited reductions by the Australian gold mining industry in the incidence of environmental impacts, regulatory non-compliance and community resistance by complying with the Cyanide Code. It has been observed that globally there have been no major environmental incidents at a gold mining operation certified as compliant with the Cyanide Code.

The Responsible Jewellery Council, an international standards-setting and certification organization for the jewelry supply chain, requires its gold mining members to have applicable sites certified in compliance with the Cyanide Code.

The Initiative for Responsible Mining Assurance (IRMA) is developing a system of best practice standards aimed at improving mining operations' social and environmental performance, with a goal of certifying mine sites in 2015. In developing its system, IRMA is building on the work of other initiatives including the Cyanide Code.

By adopting standards and practices that exceed state-imposed regulations and laws, the mining industry and financing institutions, provide an additional source of protection for indigenous and local communities. As a result, their institutional policies may strengthen the ability of developing nations to demand higher standards which would benefit these communities. Support for industry codes, such as the International Cyanide Management Code, could relieve some pressure on developing nations to maintain lower standards to attract foreign investment, according to Christine R. Thompson, writing in the Suffolk Transnational Law Review. "The Code's Principles and Standards of Practice would apply regardless of the state's regulatory environment. The Code's third-party audits guarantee uniform compliance, an aspect lacking in other voluntary measures such as the U.N. Global Compact. Wide adoption of voluntary standards might make them binding and applicable to all, regardless of whether state regulations are less stringent or protective."

The Cyanide Code also has been endorsed by the Chief Inspector of Mines in South Africa.

In 2020, Turkey's General Directorate of Mining and Petroleum Affairs, which is within the Ministry of Energy and Natural Resources, advised in a circular distributed to gold and silver mining companies operating in Turkey that adherence to the Cyanide Code "will be taken into account in the evaluations of mines carrying out enrichment activities with cyanide."

The government of Zimbabwe, like other countries, recommends that mines using cyanide in their operation do so consistent with the Cyanide Code's requirements.

Implementation and adherence to the Cyanide Code by the gold mining industry in Tanzania is required by various mining and environmental management acts and regulations. Further, Tanzanian mining officials are required to provide guidance to registered small scale gold mining operations utilizing cyanide on how to use and adhere to the Cyanide Code.

The United National Environment Programme (UNEP) has described ICMI as a partner in its efforts to promote emergency preparedness. In UNEP's 2012 publication "Commemorating 25 Years of Awareness and Preparedness for Emergencies at Local Level (APELL)," it stated that the Cyanide Code is "consistent with the APELL framework and its ten-step process."

The China Chamber of Commerce of Metals, Minerals & Chemicals Importers & Exporters,' a national industry association officially affiliated with China's Ministry of Commerce, released their first industry specific guidance on social responsibility for China's mining industry. Their "Guidelines for Social Responsibility in Outbound Mining Investment" requires Chinese mining companies to include social and environmental factors into their management plans for overseas operations and specifically encourages mining operations using cyanide to be certified in compliance with the Cyanide Code.

According to a leading expert on wildlife interaction with gold mine tailings, "Since the inception of the International Cyanide Management Code ... the issue of wildlife deaths at operations compliant with the Code has been largely resolved; however, according to available information the wildlife death rate remains unabated at operations that are not signatories to the Code."

Although the Cyanide Code was developed for industrial operators, its principles can be useful as a reference for artisanal and small-scale gold mining (ASGM) facilities to make operations safer and more environmentally responsible, according to a 2021 report produced by international development, non-governmental organization Pact. The report, Best Management Practices for Cyanide Use in the Small-Scale Gold Mining Sector, was produced for planetGOLD program, a GEF funded, UNEP-implemented initiative. The authors concluded that Cyanide Code can be used as a frame of reference for fostering safer and more responsible cyanide use in the ASGM sector. Another report in 2021 released by the United Nations Environment Programme on mining tailings waste management in the ASGM sector echoed the Pact report's conclusion about the applicability of the Cyanide Code to this informal mining sector.

In 2021, the Swiss Better Gold Association published a 16-page manual that provides practical recommendations to improve the cyanidation process at small mining operations, which, to the extent possible, follows the structure and best practices of the Cyanide Code. The Spanish language manual focuses on the particular challenges facing small-scale mining operations including the potential environmental and occupational health impacts caused by the cyanidation process if applied inappropriately.
