= Legal relationship =

Connection between two people or entities

A legal relationship, jural relationship, or legal relation is a connection between two persons or other entities that is governed by law. A legal relationship may exist, for example, between two individuals or between an individual and a government. Legal relationships often imply rights and obligations. Examples of legal relationships include contracts, marriage, and citizenship. As with other fundamental legal concepts, many different ways of defining and classifying legal relationships have been put forward.

== Significance ==
Being able to enter into legal relations is a defining characteristic of legal personhood. For example, prior to the abolition of coverture in the United States and United Kingdom, married women lacked the ability to enter into legal relations. The same was true of enslaved people under various forms of slavery, including in ancient Rome and the United States before 1865. The connection between legal personhood and the ability to enter into legal relations, or particularly the ability to have legal rights, first emerged in Renaissance humanism and was later developed by civil law scholars such as Carl von Savigny.

== Types ==
In the civil law tradition, the concept of a legal bond (iuris vinculum) was used in the Institutes of Justinian to define an obligation as "a legal bond, with which we are bound by a necessity of performing some act according to the laws of our state." The metaphor of the "legal bond", also translated as "legal shackle" or "legal chain", remains fundamental to the law of obligations.

In common law jurisdictions, to create a contractual relationship, three elements are necessary: offer and acceptance, consideration and the intention to create legal relations. Because of this third requirement, an agreement may be unenforceable if a court believes that reasonable people would not have intended it to be legally binding, such as is often the case in social arrangements and domestic arrangements.

== Theories ==
In the 19th century, the influential Pandectist legal theorist Carl von Savigny divided legal relationships into four categories: property, obligations, inheritance, and family law. Savigny thus included legal relations between persons and things, but did not consider the relations between persons and governments to be legal relations. Under Savigny's system, the question of choice of law became a question of which country was the seat of the relevant legal relationship (Sitz des Rechtsverhältnisses).

Savigny's legal theory, of which the theory of legal relations was a part, influenced not only the Continental legal tradition but British and American legal thought as well. Theories of legal relations, however, did not develop in English-speaking legal systems until the 20th century.

German jurist Gustav Radbruch, writing in 1903, considered the correlative relationship between right and duty to be the "abstract legal relationship". In Radbruch's approach, a lowest-order legal relationship is, for example, a seller's right to the purchase price correlated to the buyer's duty to pay that price. The buyer's right to the goods and the seller's duty to deliver them complete these low-order legal relationships into the composite legal relationship of the sales contract, which in turn is included in the highest-level legal relationship of private law.

Working in the Marxist legal tradition, Soviet legal scholar Evgeny Pashukanis described capitalist society as "an endless chain of legal relationships." He rejected the idea of legal relationships being derived from law, arguing instead that legal relationships were derived from economic relationships, and that even public law ultimately derived its structure from economic relationships. Pashukanis contended that because legal relations arose from bourgeois capitalist material relations, it would be necessary to maintain them for some time under the New Economic Policy, but they would ultimately be replaced by the non-law of socialism. This position was influential in the 1920s but led to his condemnation in the Stalinist purge of 1937.

=== Hohfeldian analysis ===
A systematic theory of legal relations was put forward by the US legal scholar Wesley Hohfeld in 1913 and remains widely influential. In Hohfeld's framework, there are four types of legal relations (or "jural correlatives"), between: right (or claim) and duty; privilege (or liberty) and no-right; power and liability; and immunity and disability.

In each case, one person has the first position and another person has the second position. If someone has a "right" or "claim" under Hohfeld's system, someone else has a duty to act in accordance with that right. If someone has a "privilege", someone else has a "no-right", because they have no right (or claim) to prevent the first person from acting. For example, in contract litigation, if a plaintiff has failed to mitigate damages, the defendant gains a privilege not to pay those additional damages, and the plaintiff correspondingly has no claim to such damages.

Likewise, someone with a power can change a legal relation of someone else, who has a liability. Someone with an immunity cannot have a given legal relation changed by someone else, and that second person has a disability.

Although originally intended to describe legal relations in private law, Hohfeld's framework has been extended to constitutional law, notably by the German scholar Robert Alexy.

== Bibliography ==
- Hart, H. L. A. (1961), The Concept of Law, chapter 3, Oxford: Clarendon Press.
- Kelly, J. M. (1992). A Short History of Western Legal Theory. Oxford University Press. ISBN 978-0-19-876244-7.
- Weber, Max (1964). The Theory of Social and Economic Organization (Edited with Introduction by Talcott Parsons – Translated in English by A. M. Henderson). The Free Press of Glencoe. ASIN B-000-LRHAX-2.
- Marmor, Andrei (2021). "The Pure Theory of Law". Stanford Encyclopedia of Philosophy.
