= Arm's length principle =

Parties to a transaction are on an equal footing

The arm's length principle (ALP) is the condition or the fact that the parties of a transaction are independent and on an equal footing. Such a transaction is known as an "arm's-length transaction". It is used specifically in contract law to arrange an agreement that will stand up to legal scrutiny, even though the parties may have shared interests (e.g., employer-employee) or are too closely related to be seen as completely independent (e.g., the parties have familial ties).

An arm's length relationship is distinguished from a fiduciary relationship, where the parties are not on an equal footing, but rather, power and information asymmetries exist. It is also one of the key elements in international taxation as it allows an adequate allocation of profit taxation rights among countries that conclude double tax conventions, through transfer pricing, among each other. Transfer pricing and the arm's length principle were one of the focal points of the base erosion and profit shifting (BEPS) model developed by the OECD and endorsed by the G20.

== Examples in contract law ==
A simple example of not at arm's length is the sale of real property from parents to children. The parents might wish to sell the property to their children at a price below market value, but such a transaction might later be classified by a court as a gift rather than a bona fide sale, which could have tax and other legal consequences. To avoid such a classification, the parties need to show that the transaction was conducted no differently from how it would have been for an arbitrary third party. This could be done, for example, by hiring a disinterested third party, such as an appraiser or broker, who could offer a professional opinion that the sale price is appropriate and reflects the true value of the property. The principle is often invoked to avoid any undue government influence over other bodies, such as the legal system, the press, or the arts. For example, in the United Kingdom Arts Councils operate "at arm's length" in allocating the funds they receive from the government.

In the workplace, supervisors and managers deal with employee discipline and termination of employment at arm's length through the human resources department, if the company has one. In such cases, terminations and discipline must be rendered by staff who have the training and certification to do so legally. This is intended to protect the employer from legal recourse that employees may otherwise have if it can be demonstrated that such discipline or terminations were not handled in accordance with the latest labor laws. For employees in unionized environments, shop stewards can represent the employee, whereas the HR department represents the company, so that both sides are on a more equal footing and can resolve matters outside of court, using informal negotiations or a grievance, saving both sides time and money. The arm's length dealings in this case, mean that both an employee and a supervisor each have a qualified advocate.

== International tax law ==
The Organisation for Economic Co-operation and Development (OECD) has adopted the principle in Article 9 of the OECD Model Tax Convention, to ensure that transfer prices between companies of multinational enterprises are established on a market value basis. In this context, the principle means that prices should be the same as they would have been, had the parties to the transaction not been related to each other. This is often seen as being aimed at preventing profits being systematically deviated to lowest tax countries, although most countries are also concerned about prices that fail to meet the arm's length test due to inattention rather than by design and that shifts profits to any other country (whether it has low or high tax rates).

The OECD Model Tax Convention provides the legal framework for governments to have their fair share of taxes, and for enterprises to avoid double taxation on their profits. The arm's length standard is instrumental to determine how much of the profits should be attributed to one entity and, consequently, the extent of a country's tax claim on such entity. The OECD has developed thorough guidelines on how the arm's length principle should be applied in this context. Under this approach, a price is considered appropriate if it is within a range of prices that would be charged by independent parties dealing at arm's length. This is generally defined as a price that an independent buyer would pay an independent seller for an identical item under identical terms and conditions, where neither is under any compulsion to act.

Transfer pricing became a highly controversial topic in the 2010s, which contributed to the development of the Base Erosion and Profit Shifting (BEPS) project by the OECD and with the endorsement of the G20. The World Customs Organization (WCO) and World Trade Organization (WTO) have also adopted, in effect, the arm's length principle in Customs valuations. The Agreement on Implementation of Article VII (known as the WTO Agreement on Customs Valuation or the “Valuation Agreement”) ensures that determinations of the customs value for the application of duty rates to imported goods are conducted in a neutral and uniform manner, precluding the use of arbitrary or fictitious customs values.

== See also ==
- English contract law
- Say on pay
- Transfer pricing
- Customs valuation
