= Nagarwala case =

Indian fraud and impersonation scandal

The Nagarwala case or Nagarwala scandal refers to an Indian fraud case where Rustom Sohrab Nagarwala allegedly imitated Prime Minister of India Indira Gandhi and convinced Ved Prakash Malhotra to withdraw ₹60 lakhs from the branch of the State Bank of India where he was the head cashier. However, there has been some controversy over the actual events that transpired.

== Crime ==
On 24 May 1971, Nagarwala called Malhotra at the State Bank of India, and did a vocal impression of Prime Minister Indira Gandhi. Nagarwala claimed that the Prime Minister immediately needed ₹60 lakhs. Some sources report that the money was needed for a "secret mission to Bangladesh", while others report more simply that the money was requested for a "man from Bangladesh". In his later confession, Nagarwala stated that he described it as a "matter of great national importance". Nagarwala further told Malhotra that he should contact the Prime Minister's office at a later date to get a receipt. Malhotra agreed to get the money and later delivered it to Nagarwala (who claimed to be a courier working for the Prime Minister) in a taxi later that day.

== Arrest and trial ==
Later, Malhotra went to the Prime Minister's residence to get a receipt as requested, but was informed that no such request for funds had been made by the Prime Minister. Malhotra informed the police of the fraud. Within less than one day, Nagarwala was found and arrested at the airport, and the majority of the money was recovered. Nagarwala allegedly confessed to the crime on 26 May, and was convicted in a ten-minute court trial. In his book on investigative journalism, S.K. Aggarwal called the speed of this trial "unique in legal history". Nagarwala was sentenced to four years imprisonment and died while in custody.

== Reddy Commission report and aftermath ==
In 1977, after a change in government, Pingle Jaganmohan Reddy was appointed to inquire into the event, among other cases. Before the commission met, the magazine India Today expressed some doubts about the official version of events, with questions on the bank's conduct, Nagarwala's past and his ability to imitate Gandhi's voice, and instead proposed in "one possible reconstruction" that he was an undercover courier funneling money to support guerillas in Bangladesh on behalf of the state and the government was washing their hands clean of him after a deputy cashier had reported his activity to the police. In 1978 the Commission issued an 820-page report on the matter. According to the report, the bank had kept private, unaccounted assets and Gandhi's office had obstructed the police investigations, but there was no evidence that she had been kept money at the bank in this manner. Most notably, the report found that the confession should have been rejected and that it was unsubstantiated by any evidence. They also found that Nagarwala's death was caused by a myocardial infarction and thus there was no reason to suspect foul play. S.K. Aggarwal said that a 1986 article in The Statesman described a series of letters by Nagarwala that imply a relationship between himself and Indira Gandhi, though Gandhi herself could not specifically recall meeting Nagarwala. In letters written while he was jailed, Nagarwala claimed that he wanted to reveal the truth behind the crime and that it would be a "great eye opener for the nation".

Some attention was renewed to the case after Chief Information Commissioner Wajahat Habibullah ordered the Ministry of Home Affairs to fulfill an RTI request from a member of the Reddy Commission asking for evidence transcripts, which was initially rejected.

== See also ==
- Rajkissore Dutt
- Such a Long Journey (novel)
