= Prabhat =

Prabhat may refer to:

- Prabhat Kumar, Indian politician and civil servant
- Prabhat Kumar Mishra, Indian politician
- Prabhat Kumar Mukhopadhyaya, Indian writer in Bengali
- Prabhat Kumar Mukhopadhyay, Indian writer
- Prabhat Kumar Samantaray, Indian politician
- Prabhat Kumar Verma, Indian politician
- Prabhat Patnaik, Indian economist
- Prabhat Ranjan Sarkar, Indian religious leader, social reformer, author and composer; founder of Ananda Marga
  - Prabhat Samgiita, Bengali songs composed by Prabhat Ranjan Sarkar
- Prabhat Roy, Indian film director
- Prabhat Film Company, Indian film production company
- Prabhat Kalavidaru, Indian theatre troupe
- Prabhat Kumar College, West Bengal, India
- Prabhat Sangeet, Bengali poetry collection by Rabindranath Tagore
- Prabhat Khabar, Indian Hindi-language daily newspaper
- Prabhatham, Indian Malayalam-language weekly newspaper
- Prabhat Kumar, is an Indian civil servant

== See also ==
- Prabath, a Sinhala male given name
