= Indian Revenue Service (Customs and Indirect Taxes) =

Central Civil Service under Central Board of Indirect Taxes and Customs

Indian Revenue Service (Custom and Indirect Taxes)
- Logo of IRS (C&IT)

Service overview
- Founded: 1919; 107 years ago (as Imperial Customs Service); 1953; 73 years ago (as Indian Revenue Service Customs and Central Excise)
- Headquarters: North Block, New Delhi
- Country: India
- Staff colleges: National Academy of Customs Indirect Taxes and Narcotics, NH-44, Palasamudram, Andhra Pradesh, India
- Cadre controlling authority: Central Board of Indirect Taxes and Customs, Department of Revenue, Ministry of Finance
- Minister responsible: Nirmala Sitharaman, Minister of Finance
- Legal personality: Governmental; Civil service
- Website: cbic.gov.in/entities/customs
- Cadre strength: 5583 (Customs and Indirect Taxes)
- Selection: Civil Services Examination
- Associations: IRS (Customs & Indirect Taxes) Association

Service chief
- Chairperson, CBIC: Sanjay Agarwal, IRS

Head of the civil services
- Cabinet Secretary: T. V. Somanathan, IAS

The Indian Revenue Service (Customs and Indirect Taxes) is a part of central civil service of the government of India. It is a part of the Indian Revenue Service and functions under the Central Board of Indirect Taxes and Customs, Department of Revenue of the Ministry of Finance. It is under the administrative direction of the Revenue Secretary and the ministerial command of the Minister of Finance. The IRS (C&IT) is primarily responsible for collecting and administering indirect taxes accruing to the government of India. It is one of the largest civil service amongst the organised civil services in the Indian government and serves the nation through discharging sovereign functions of collection of revenue for development, security and governance.

As with other countries that follow the Westminster system of government, the IRS is part of the permanent bureaucracy of the nation, and is an inseparable part of the executive of the Government of India. As such, the bureaucracy remains politically neutral and guarantees administrative continuity to the ruling party.

The duties of the IRS (C&IT) include formulation and enforcement of policy concerning the Goods and Services Tax, prevention of smuggling and administration of matters related to customs and narcotics.

== History ==
With the passing of the Government of India Act, 1919 the civil services—under the oversight of the Secretary of State for India—were split into two arms, the All India Services and the Central Services. Apart from the Central Secretariat, the more important of these latter were the Railway Services, the Indian Posts and Telegraph Service, and the Imperial Customs Service. After Independence, the Imperial Customs Service was reconstituted as the Indian Revenue Service (Customs and Central Excise) in 1953.

The nature of the service underwent a transformational change with the enactment of the One Hundred and First Amendment of the Constitution of India, which overhauled the administration of indirect taxation in India with the introduction of the Goods and Services Tax (GST). With the subsumption of several indirect taxes and levies, including central excise duty and service tax, under the GST, the nomenclature was updated to reflect the changed structure of taxation from IRS (Customs and Central Excise) to IRS (Customs and Indirect Taxes).

== Recruitment ==
There are two streams of recruitment to the Indian Revenue Service. IRS officers may enter into the IRS by passing the Civil Services Examination (CSE). The CSE is a three-stage competitive selection process consisting of a preliminary examination, a main examination, and an interview. It is administered by the Union Public Service Commission (UPSC). IRS officers recruited in this way are called direct recruits.

Some IRS officers are also recruited from Central Services (Group B). These include Customs Appraisers Service (Group B), Customs Preventive Service (Group B), and Central Excise Service (Group B). Group 'B' officers are gradually promoted over several years of service. The current ratio of two streams at the entry level is kept 1:1. All IRS officers, regardless of their mode of entry, are appointed by the President of India.

Only about 250 candidates out of over 1 million applicants, who apply through the Civil Services Examination, are successful - a success rate of 0.025%.

== Training ==
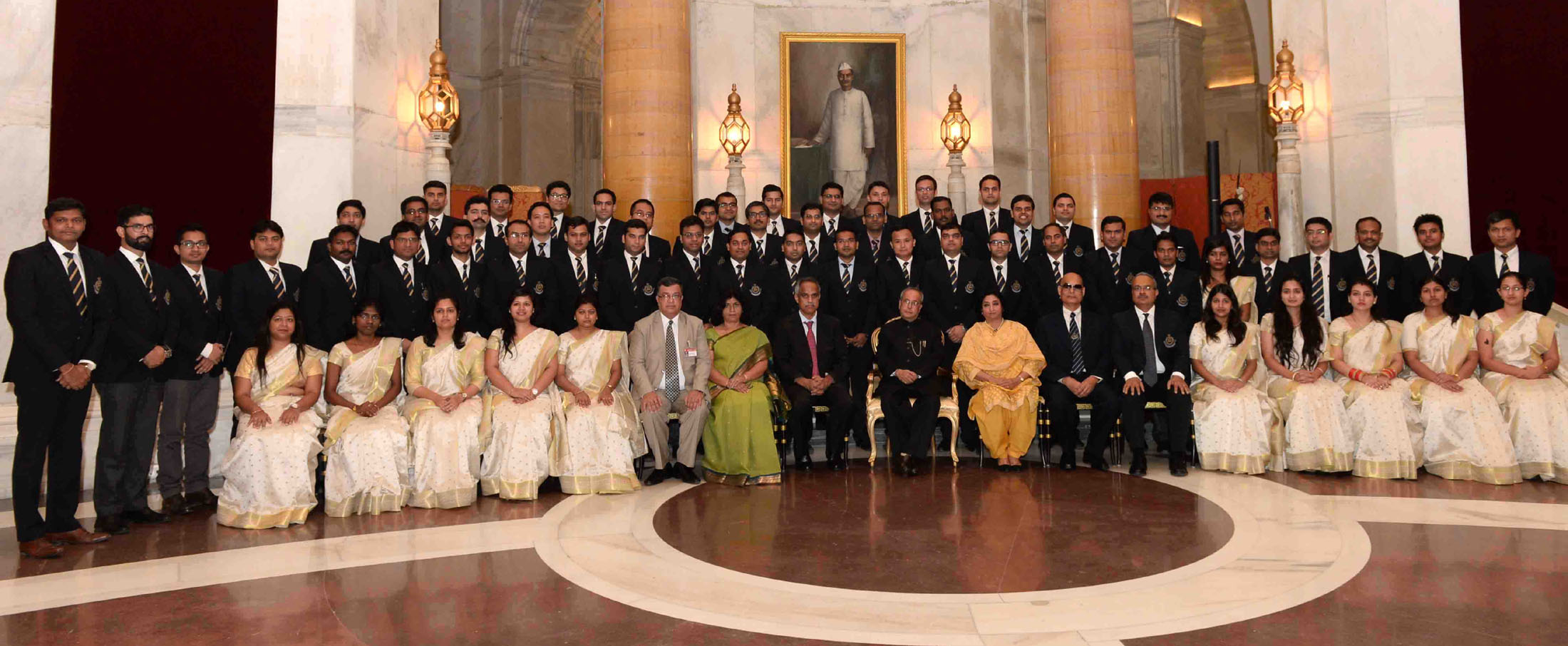
Pranab Mukherjee with the Probationers of 66th (2014 Batch) of the Indian Revenue Service (Customs & Central Excise) from National Academy of Customs, Excise & Narcotics, Faridabad, at Rashtrapati Bhavan, in New Delhi

After selection, successful candidates undergo a 3-month Foundation Course at the Lal Bahadur Shastri National Academy of Administration (LBSNAA) in Mussoorie, Uttarakhand.

=== National Academy of Customs, Indirect Taxes, and Narcotics ===
Thereafter, IRS (C&IT) Officer Trainees (OTs) undergo specialised training at National Academy of Customs Indirect Taxes and Narcotics (NACIN), in Palasamudram located in Sri Sathya Sai district, Andhra Pradesh.

This is apex institution of government of India for capacity building in the field of customs, indirect taxes, and narcotics under the administrative control of Central Board of Indirect Taxes and Customs (CBIC). The functions of NACIN is specified in CBIC office order No.06/Ad.IV/2017 on 12 June 2017 which states that NACIN will undertake training and other capacity training activities in the field of customs, indirect taxes, and narcotics including:

- Induction training of directly recruited Group A officers,
- Specialized and periodic training to in-service officers,
- Induction training to Group B and C officers,
- Training to state/union territory and other stake holders in the area of indirect taxation,
- Management and soft skills training for overall personal and professional development of officers,
- International cooperation and training activities in narcotics, customs and other allied areas,

Any other capacity building activity as may be assigned by CBIC from time to time, besides carrying out normal administrative and establishment functions. NACIN has signed a memorandum of understanding with the National Law School of India University in Bengaluru to award postgraduate diplomas in business laws to the officer trainees. The finance ministry has approved exchange of officer trainees to various countries across the world such as Netherlands, Belgium, Switzerland, France, Australia, Malaysia, United States of America, Brazil, South Africa and OECD Nations for increasing exposure to the future administrators.

== Responsibilities ==
IRS officers serve the government of India in different capacities/roles. While administering indirect taxes, they formulate and implement policies, discharge the functions of an investigator, quasi-judicial authority, prosecutor and negotiator of international agreements etc. Their main roles could be briefly described as under:

- Policy formulation: The taxation policies are dynamic and keep changing with the emerging needs of the economy and the country. The tax policy is not limited to raising of revenue. As a part of the overall policy of the government of India, the tax policy also serves as a tool to address several other objectives in the process of development of the country. These objectives may include providing for incentives and disincentives in the target areas/segments of the economy. Appropriate policy interventions in the direct tax are formulated by the IRS officers based upon the experience in the field formation and other relevant inputs from various sources and submitted to the government through the CBIC.
- Tax administrator, investigator, quasi-judicial authority and prosecutor: Majority of the officers are, therefore, involved in this function in some way or the other. The process of tax collection is mainly driven through the regime of voluntary compliance in which the tax payers have to pay their taxes as per the mandate of the law, following the procedure laid down including mandatory filing of returns of income or other specified statements. However, there is always a gap between the expected and the achieved level of compliance. Main reasons for the gap may include tax evasion through willful suppression of material facts/aggressive tax planning or mistakes committed by the tax payers. With a view to detect such aberrations and promote voluntary compliance, several interventions are done through selective scrutiny (examination) of returns/statements, surveys, search and seizure etc. In serious cases of defaults, criminal prosecutions are instituted after completing requisite investigation. In the process, the IRS officers discharge the functions of an investigator, quasi-judicial authority and prosecutor.
- Black money: One of the most important functions of IRS is detection and curbing black money in the country. While taking all possible measures in this regard domestically, IRS officers are also responsible to negotiate international agreements with other tax jurisdictions, to plug misuse of international financial processes for tax evasion and avoidance. India has been playing a prominent role, inter alia, in developing the new global standards on automatic exchange of information which would enable the tax authorities to receive information about taxpayers hiding their money in offshore financial centers and tax havens through multi-layered entities with non-transparent ownership, on an automatic basis.
- Serving other ministries/departments/organisations on deputation: IRS officers contribute to policy formulation, and make a final decision in certain matters, with the agreement of the minister concerned or the council of ministers (depending upon the weight of the matter), when posted at higher level in the government of India as a deputy secretary, director, joint secretary or–in rare cases–additional secretary.
- International bilateral and multilateral negotiations: IRS officers participate and negotiate treaties on behalf of the government of India in the fiscal matters in both bilateral or multilateral forums such as OECD, WTO, World Customs Organization, and the United Nations. They engage in international cooperation in the work areas of exchange of information, transfer pricing, taxation of cross-border transactions, and negotiation of free trade agreements.
- Anti-smuggling and narcotics control: Enforcement measures against illicit traffic under the various international conventions and protocols that are in force at present regarding narcotics control.
- Revenue intelligence: On the indirect tax side, Directorate of Revenue Intelligence, i.e., DRI (for custom duty evasion, smuggling etc.) and Directorate General of GST Intelligence, i.e., DGGI (for GST evasion) are the agencies which are responsible for the collection of intelligence regarding evasion and smuggling of indirect taxes and also for prosecuting the offenders. A new system of e-way bill is also being rolled out under the GST to check evasion in the inter-state and intrastate goods transfer.

== Designations ==
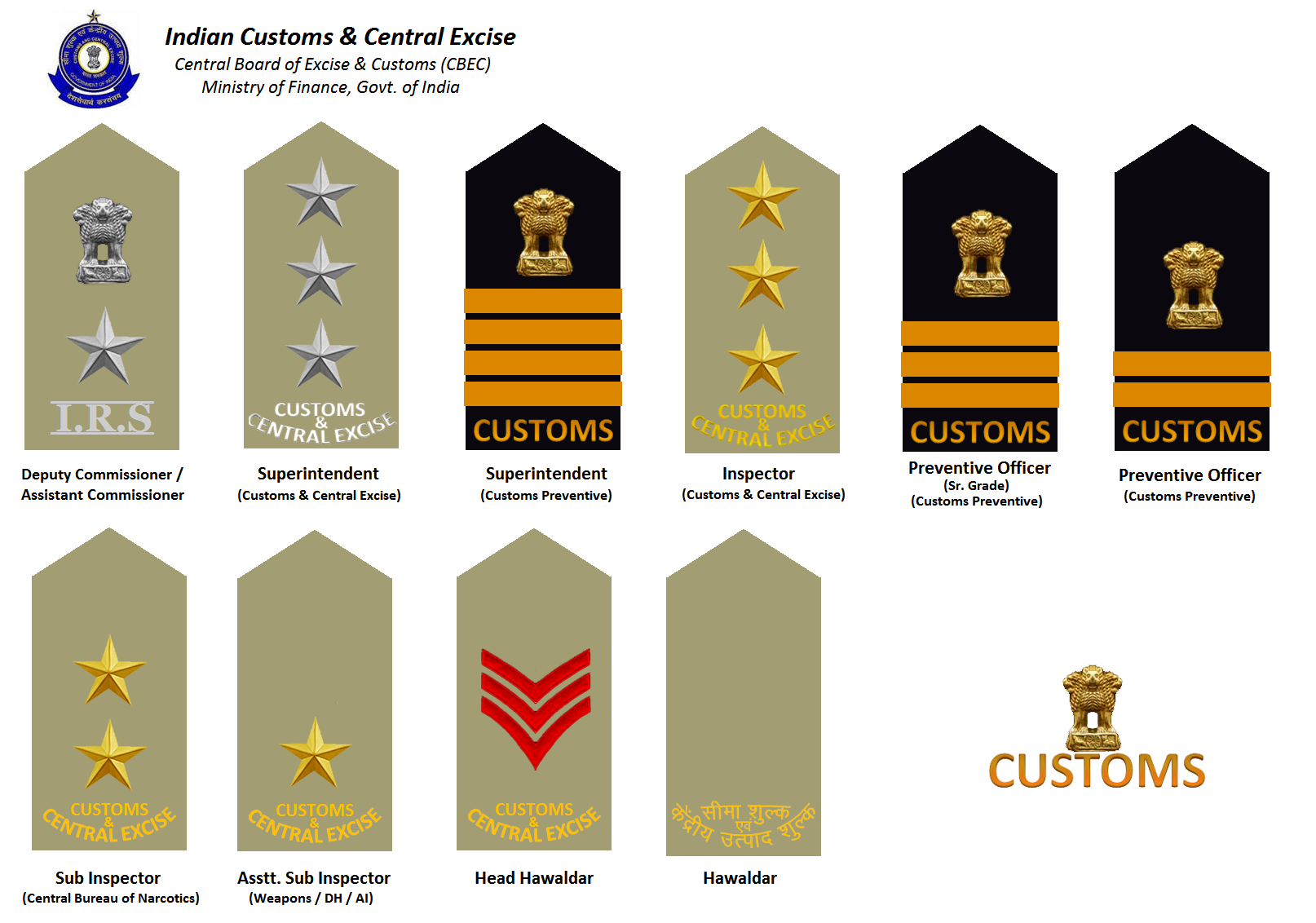
Indian Revenue Service (Custom & Indirect Taxes) rank badges.

An IRS officer could rise up-to the Apex Scale (Rs.2,25,000 fixed plus allowances) at the post of principal chief commissioner of income tax in the ITD. At the apex level, he can also get selected as a Member or Chairperson of the Central Board of Direct Taxes. The intermediate grades in this career progression are deputy commissioner, joint commissioner, additional commissioner, commissioner, principal commissioner and chief commissioner of income tax. An IRS officer is also eligible to be selected as a member of the Income Tax Appellate Tribunal, Authority for Advance Ruling, Income Tax Settlement Commission and Income Tax Ombudsman as per the prescribed eligibility criteria. Income Tax Overseas Units have been set up designating IRS officers as diplomats in the rank of First Secretary in various missions and consulates of India abroad to look into tax evasion and compliance matters which enables them to work in the place of Indian Foreign Service officers abroad. Cadre Review has been cleared in the Income Tax Department creating 20,751 additional posts to help generate additional revenue of ₹25,000 crore (equivalent to ₹420 billion or US$4.4 billion in 2023) crore annually.

The designations and time-scales within the Indian Revenue Service are as follows after cadre restructure:

Ranks, designations, and positions held by Indian Revenue Service (Customs & Indirect Taxes) officers in their career
Grade / Scale (Level on Pay Matrix)	Posting in Central GST / Customs (CBIC)	Position in Government of India	Position in Order of precedence in India	Pay Scale (Basic Pay)
Administrative Head (Pay Level 17)	Chairperson of the CBIC	Secretary	23 (Note: CBIC Chairman is the senior-most IRS(C&CE) officer and the administrative head of the Indian Revenue Service (Customs and Indirect Taxes), and is equivalent to Secretary to the Government of India.)	₹225,000 (US$2,300)
Apex Scale (Pay Level 17)	Member of the CBIC Director of the Directorate of Revenue Intelligence Principal Chief Commissioner of Central GST / Customs (PCCIT)	Secretary Special Secretary	23	₹225,000 (US$2,300)
Higher Administrative Grade + (Pay Level 16)	Chief Commissioner of Central GST / Customs (CCIT)	Additional Secretary	25	₹205,400 (US$2,100)—₹224,400 (US$2,300)
Higher Administrative Grade (Pay Level 15)	Principal Commissioner of Central GST / Customs	Additional Secretary	25	₹182,200 (US$1,900)—₹224,100 (US$2,300)
Senior Administrative Grade (Pay Level 14)	Commissioner of Central GST / Customs Additional Director General	Joint Secretary	26	₹144,200 (US$1,500)—₹218,200 (US$2,300)
Selection Grade (Pay Level 13)	Additional Commissioner of Central GST / Customs	Director		₹123,100 (US$1,300)—₹215,900 (US$2,300)
Junior Administrative Grade (Pay Level 12)	Joint Commissioner of Central GST / Customs	Deputy Secretary		₹78,800 (US$820)—₹209,200 (US$2,200)
Senior Time Scale (Pay Level 11)	Deputy Commissioner of Central GST / Customs	Under Secretary		₹67,700 (US$710)—₹208,700 (US$2,200)
Junior Time Scale (Pay Level 10)	Assistant Commissioner of Central GST / Customs Entry-level (Probationer)	Assistant Secretary		₹56,100 (US$590)—₹177,500 (US$1,900)

== Major concerns ==
=== Corruption ===
In 2015, it was reported that as many as 108 IRS officers were under probe by the CBI for their alleged involvement in corruption. From May 2009 to May 2010, the CBI had sought sanction for prosecution of 102 IRS officials posted in different parts of the country in connection with corruption cases.

In 2016, the Ministry of Finance, dismissed 72 and prematurely retired another 33 Indian Revenue Service officers for non-performance and on disciplinary grounds.

The IRS officials top the Central Bureau of Investigation’s list of most corrupt bureaucrats. In one case, a 1992 batch IRS officer was arrested for accepting a bribe of ₹2 crore in Mumbai. Recently, in another case, some IRS officials were found to help certain companies evade payment of service tax and related penalties of the order of ₹1 crore. Also CBI raided premises of an income tax officer for demanding bribe to the tune of ₹60 crore for covering up Stock Guru scam.

=== Staff shortages ===
As of 2013, the IRS has a significant shortfall in employees. Since liberalization era in 1990's emphasis on governmental cost cutting has been the norm and the department has been facing shortages in officer and staff cadre. Approximately more than half of the junior officers and staff positions were lying vacant. It was hoped that computerization would reduce the dependence on staff during the 2001 restructuring of the department after the desk officer system. Subsequently, unscientific promotion policies owing to pressure tactics of the unions have resulted in the creation of a situation where staff without any proper experience or qualification are promoted to supervisory ranks seriously jeopardizing the efficiency and service delivery and leaving huge vacancies at the investigation and assessment charges. There have been many instances where drivers have been promoted to the rank of Inspector of income tax which is a bedrock of the investigation mechanism for detecting tax evasion without proper screening. While this indicates a democratic scenario where every competent worker can aspire to rise up in the hierarchy but no safeguards have been put in place to ensure merit of the promoted candidates. According to the Economic Times, severe shortages may be negatively impacting the government's ability to scrutinise returns and catch instances of black money.

=== Murder of many officers ===
Even though IRS officers have to deal with sensitive posting in their career they are not provided adequate security. Many IRS officers in the departments of customs and income tax have been assassinated in the course of their investigations.

== Recent initiatives ==
Many new initiatives were taken by the Indian Revenue Service members to curb corruption in their respective departments and make the system more efficient and responsive to the needs of the tax payers. Use of technology widely reduced scope for the abuse of power. Refund Banker scheme introduced in 2007 eliminated the scope for corruption in the refunds of excessive tax collected by the Department. Introduction of e-filing of taxes and effective implementation of Permanent Account Number (PAN) are some steps that reduced the scope for corruption at all levels while improving the efficiency of the whole system. Use of Centralised Processing Center setup in 2010 at Bangalore of the Income Tax Department (ITD) reduced unnecessary delays in processing returns. These computerization initiatives have freed up the human resources in the department which are largely responsible for higher revenue collections.

Income Tax Ombudsmen has been created in 2006 and is functional at 12 cities to look into tax related grievances of the public. Department is also gearing to improve its tax payer's services with Sevottam scheme. Under this scheme various initiatives such as Citizen Charter, Ayakar Seva Kendra (ASK) which is a single window mechanism for implementing Sevottam through delivery of these services within the time lines promised in the Citizen's Charter were launched. Aaykar Sampark Kendra consists of one National Call Centre and 4 regional call centres to aid the taxpayer were inaugurated by the Finance Minister.

IRS officers handling sensitive postings are issued a Glock Model 22 pistol or a Glock 23 in .40 S&W caliber.

== See also ==
- Civil Services of India
- All India Service
- Corruption in India
- Directorate General of GST Intelligence
- Directorate of Revenue Intelligence
- Enforcement Directorate
- Central Bureau of Narcotics
