= National Academy of Customs Indirect Taxes and Narcotics =

Civil service training institute in Palasamudram, India

National Academy of Customs, Indirect Taxes and Narcotics
- राष्ट्रीय सीमा शुल्क, अप्रत्यक्ष कर एवं नार्कोटिक्स अकादमी
- Abbreviation: NACIN
- Legal status: Civil Service Training Institute
- Headquarters: Palasamudram, Andhra Pradesh, India
- Location: 44(India)NH-44, Palasamudram, Gorantla Mandal, Hindupur Taluk, Sri Sathya Sai district, Andhra Pradesh
- Coordinates: 13.9742°N 77.6740°E
- Services: Training, education and research
- Official language: English and Hindi
- Director General: M Subramanyam IRS
- Main organ: Central Board of Indirect Taxes and Customs (CBIC)
- Parent organisation: Minister of Finance, Government of India
- Subsidiaries: 16 Zonal Training Institutes and 2 Regional Training Institutes
- Website: nacin.gov.in
- Formerly called: National Academy of Customs, Excise and Narcotics (NACEN), renamed in 2017

The National Academy of Customs, Indirect Taxes and Narcotics (NACIN) formerly known as National Academy of Customs, Excise and Narcotics (NACEN) is the apex civil service training institute of the Government of India for capacity building of civil servants in the field of indirect taxation, particularly the areas of Customs, GST, Central Excise, Service Tax and Narcotics Control Administration. Located at Palasamudram near Hindupur in Andhra Pradesh, the academy is operated under the aegis of the Central Board of Indirect Taxes and Customs, Department of Revenue, Ministry of Finance, Government of India.

Training for Group A staff and overseas trainees is conducted at the main campus at Palasamudram, and the training of the Group B and Group C officers is conducted at various zonal and regional training centres across India. The main campus runs the flagship training programme for the Group A probationer officers of the indirect taxation branch Indian Revenue Service, better known as IRS (Customs & Indirect Tax) which administers GST, Customs and Narcotics control. These officer trainees, also known as direct recruits, are selected through the Civil Services Examination conducted by the Union Public Service Commission.

== History ==
In 1955, the institute started as a training school in a small building at Daryaganj in Old Delhi, which first relocated to Rajendra Place in Hauz Khas in South Delhi, then to Pushpa Bhawan in Saket in Delhi. It relocated to a 23-acre campus at Faridabad in 1996, and finally to the present 500+ acre campus at Palasamudram under Gorantla Mandal of Sri Sathya Sai district in Andhra Pradesh, that was inaugurated by the Hon'ble Prime Minister of India, Mr. Narendra Modi on 16 January 2024.

== Organisation ==
NACIN functions under the administrative control of the Central Board of Indirect Taxes & Customs, Department of Revenue, Ministry of Finance, Government of India. NACIN is headed by a Principal Director General or a Director General, who is a senior civil servant of India, belonging to the Indian Revenue Service, who is of the rank of Additional Secretary to Government of India. The Principal Director General or Director General is assisted by Principal Additional Directors General, Additional Directors General, Additional Directors, Joint Directors, Deputy Directors and Assistant Directors.

== Main campus at Palasamudram ==
=== Academics and training ===
==== Courses for MoF officers ====
Over the last two decades, NACIN, along with its zonal and regional training institutes, has been conducting the professional training programme for officer trainees of the Indian Revenue Service (Customs & Indirect Tax).

===== Group-A officers =====
Starting in December each year, after the three-month long Foundation Course at Lal Bahadur Shastri National Academy of Administration, the professional training programme involves over eighteen months of class room and on-the-job training. Officer trainees are trained in the administration of Customs, Goods and Services Tax (GST), Excise, erstwhile Service Tax, VAT, Valuation, Audit, and Enforcement through a combination of class room sessions and visits to departmental locations across the length and breadth of the country.

The Academy also conducts Mid-Career Training Programs for officers of the Indian Revenue Service (Customs & Central GST) at the transition to specific milestones of their tenure, and, with effect from 2024, Induction Training for officers promoted to Group-A IRS from Group-B feeder cadres.

===== Group-B and Group-C officers =====
Apart from training of the Group-A direct recruits, NACIN and its regional training institutes also conduct induction training for its Group-B (both Gazetted and Non-Gazetted) and Group-C officers of the service. In-service training programs are organised for officers of Government of India across several departments in the field of customs, GST, Central Excise, Service Tax, drug laws, green customs, cyber security, anti-money laundering, Weapons of Mass Destruction, Fake Indian Currency Notes, Intellectual Property Rights, among other subjects. These enable the field officers to develop requisite skills for keeping pace with the current international developments and the changing tax administration scenario in the country.

==== Training for others ====
===== GoI departments =====
In addition, sensitisation to the working of other stakeholders is built through short training modules with organisations such as Wildlife institute of India, Indian Coast Guard, Indian Navy, central Bureau of Narcotics, National Police Academy, National Industrial Security Academy, BSF, ITBP.

===== World Customs Organization's staff =====
NACIN is the World Customs Organization's Regional Training Centre for Asia Pacific. Also, as a recognised centre for capacity building, NACIN conducts programs in the field of environment protection (Ozone Depleting Substances training) in collaboration with the United Nations Environment Program and modules for training on drug law enforcement with the United Nations Office on Drugs and Crime. The Government of India has entrusted NACIN the responsibility of knowledge exchange, experience sharing and training with various countries of the world.

=== Campus facilities ===
==== Academic infrastructure ====
The Academy at Palasamudram is equipped with a campus spanning more than 500 acres. Facilities include separate buildings housing Administrative Block, Academic Block having 80-seater and 200-seater lecture halls and a 200-seater senate hall, Immersive Learning Facility having facilities for immersive training on Wildlife Crime Detection, Baggage Scanning, etc., like Marine Simulator, Virtual Reality, Augmented Reality, Library Block, Auditorium, Helipad, Officers' Mess, Parade Ground, Cricket Stadium, Athletic Field, Swimming Pool and Diving Pool, Indoor Sports Complex, 2 Hostel Blocks for trainees, VIP Guest House, Senior Faculty Suites, etc. In addition to the existing buildings, additional buildings are envisaged for Bank, Post Office, Shopping Complex, Kendriya Vidyalaya (Secondary and Senior Secondary School), and residential quarters for the academy faculty and staff.

==== Trainee and guests accommodation ====
There are 2 hostel blocks for trainees, 1 VIP guest house and 10 cottages for guests, and senior faculty suites for guest faculty.

== Other campuses ==
=== Center Of Excellence ===
NACIN has a Center Of Excellence formerly functioning at New Delhi at CBIC premises, for research work in the field of Indirect Tax and related areas, which has now been shifted to the main campus of NACIN at Palasamudram, Andhra Pradesh.

=== Zonal and Regional Training Institutes ===
NACIN has its Headquarters at Palasamudram, Andhra Pradesh with Zonal Training Institutes and Regional Training Institutes across the country. Zonal Training Institutes are situated at Delhi, Chennai, Mumbai, Kolkata, Bengaluru, Cochin, Patna, Kanpur, Vadodara, Hyderabad, Shillong, Bhopal, Vishakapatnam, Bhubaneswar, Chandigarh, Jaipur; Regional Training Institutes are situated at Raipur and Ranchi.

Headquarters of NACIN was shifted from Faridabad, Haryana, to the state-of-the-art campus at Palasamudram, Gorantla Mandal, Hindupur Taluka, Sri Sathya Sai district of Andhra Pradesh. The Foundation Stone for the same was laid at the proposed site by Union Finance Minister Shri Arun Jaitley and Andhra Pradesh Chief Minister Shri N.Chandrababu Naidu in April 2015, the institute is among the national institutes promised to the State by the Centre ahead of bifurcation. The new campus of NACIN at Palasamudram was inaugurated by the Hon'ble Prime Minister of India, Mr. Narendra Modi, on 16 January 2024.

== See also ==
- Chartered Institute of Taxation
- List of educational institutions in Gurgaon
- List of institutions of higher education in Haryana
- List of universities in India
