= Prabhat Kumar (civil servant) =

Biography

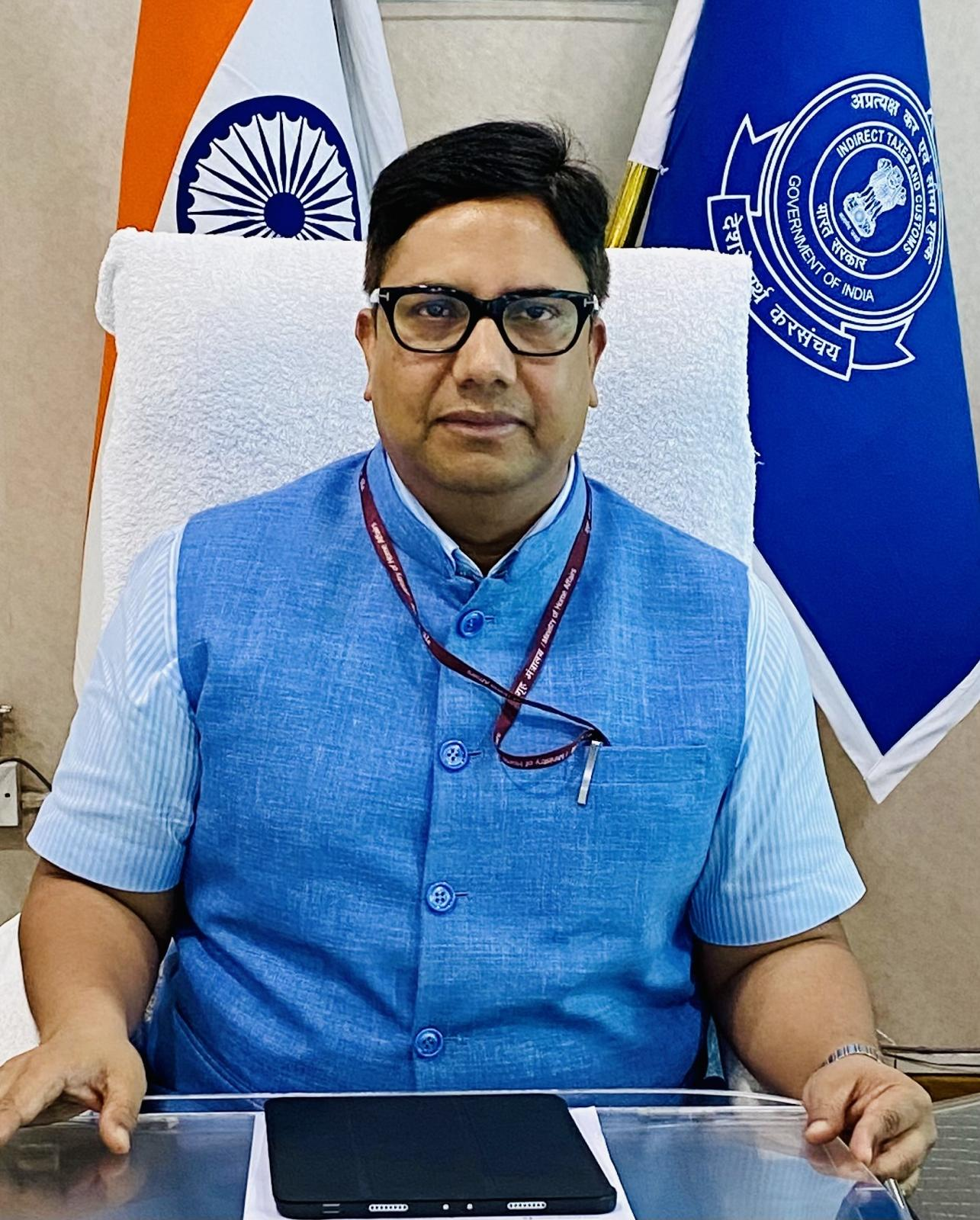
- Born: Shri Prabhat Kumar
- Education: IIT Delhi (BTech, MTech); Maxwell School of Citizenship and Public Affairs (MPA)
- Occupations: Civil servant, author
- Years active: 1994-present
- Employer: Government of India
- Organization: Indian Revenue Service (Customs and Indirect Taxes)

Prabhat Kumar is an Indian civil servant and author. An officer of the Indian Revenue Service, he holds the rank of Principal Commissioner of Customs and Indirect Taxes under the Central Board of Indirect Taxes and Customs (CBIC), Ministry of Finance. As of May 2026, he was serving as Principal Additional Director General at the Mumbai zonal campus of the National Academy of Customs Indirect Taxes and Narcotics (NACIN).

== Early life and education ==
Kumar was born on 31 December 1970. He studied at the Indian Institute of Technology Delhi, where he completed Bachelor of Technology and Master of Technology degrees. He later received a Master of Public Administration from the Maxwell School of Citizenship and Public Affairs at Syracuse University in the United States.

== Career ==
Kumar is an officer of the 1994 batch of the Indian Revenue Service. During his earlier career, he worked as a director in the Tax Research Unit under the former Central Board of Excise and Customs.

From August 2008 to July 2013, Kumar served as a director at the Central Vigilance Commission.

From August 2013 to September 2015, Kumar served as Chief Vigilance Officer of Pawan Hans, a government-owned helicopter operator. The Government of India approved his appointment in July 2013. During his tenure, the company's vigilance department investigated financial irregularities amounting to approximately ₹1.30 crore at its Lakshadweep base.

From June 2017 to June 2021, Kumar served as Commissioner of Customs (Appeals), handling appeals under customs, GST and foreign-exchange laws.

From June 2021 to October 2023, he served as Commissioner of CGST and Central Excise in Navi Mumbai.

In 2023, Kumar was promoted to the rank of Principal Commissioner. Since October 2023, he has served at the Mumbai zonal campus of the National Academy of Customs, Indirect Taxes and Narcotics (NACIN). The 2026 CBIC civil list recorded him as Principal Additional Director General at NACIN's Mumbai campus.

== Alumni leadership ==
In 2024, Kumar was elected chairman of PanIIT Alumni India for the 2025-2027 term. PanIIT Alumni India is an umbrella organisation representing alumni associations of the Indian Institutes of Technology.

Before becoming chairman of PanIIT Alumni India, Kumar served as Global President of the IIT Delhi Alumni Association. The association also lists him as its president for the 2017-2018 term.

== Publications ==
Year	Title	Publisher	ISBN
2026	IIT: The Story of India's Most Prestigious Educational Ecosystem	HarperCollins India	ISBN 978-93-7307-492-4
