= Kendrapara Lok Sabha constituency =

Lok Sabha constituency in Odisha

Coordinates: 20.497667°N 86.424726°E

Kendrapara OD-15
- Lok Sabha constituency
- Interactive Map Outlining Kendrapara Lok Sabha constituency

Constituency details
- Country: India
- Region: East India
- State: Odisha
- Assembly constituencies: Salipur; Mahanga; Patkura; Kendrapara; Aul; Rajanagar; Mahakalapada
- Established: 1952
- Total electors: 17,95,725 (Note: as on 2024) (Note: as data published by election commission)
- Reservation: None

Member of Parliament
- 18th Lok Sabha
- Incumbent Baijayant Panda
- Party: BJP
- Elected year: 2024

The Kendrapara Lok Sabha constituency is one of the 21 Lok Sabha (parliamentary) constituencies in Odisha state in Eastern India. Following the delimitation of parliamentary and assembly constituencies implemented in 2008, the constituency comprises seven Legislative Assembly segments spread across Kendrapara and Cuttack districts.

The constituency covers a predominantly coastal and riverine region of eastern Odisha,sencompassing urban, semi-urban and rural ettlements situated in the deltaic plains formed by the Brahmani, Baitarani and Mahanadi river systems.

== Assembly Segments ==
Assembly Constituencies which constitute this Parliamentary Constituency, after delimitation of Parliamentary Constituencies and Legislative Assembly Constituencies of 2008 are:

| # | Name | District | Member | Party | Leading (in 2024) |
|---|---|---|---|---|---|
| 94 | Salipur | Cuttack | Prasanta Behera | BJD | BJP |
| 95 | Mahanga | Cuttack | Sarada Prasad Padhan | IND | BJP |
| 96 | Patkura | Kendrapara | Arvind Mohapatra | BJD | BJP |
| 97 | Kendrapara (SC) | Kendrapara | Ganeswar Behera | BJD | BJP |
| 98 | Aul | Kendrapara | Pratap Keshari Deb | BJD | BJP |
| 99 | Rajanagar | Kendrapara | Dhruba Charan Sahoo | BJD | BJD |
| 100 | Mahakalapada | Kendrapara | Durga Prasan Nayak | BJP | BJP |

Assembly Constituencies which constituted this Parliamentary Constituency, before delimitation of Parliamentary Constituencies and Legislative Assembly Constituencies of 2008 are: Aul, Pattamundai, Rajnagar, Kendrapara, Patkura, Kisannagar and Mahanga.

== Elected members ==
Since its formation in 1952, 19 elections have been held till date including one bypoll in 1985. It was a two member constituency in 1957.

Elected members from the Kendrapara constituency are:

| Year | Member | Party |
|---|---|---|
| 1952 | Nityanand Kanungo | Indian National Congress |
| 1957 (Note: It was a 2 member constituency) | Surendranath Dwivedy | Praja Socialist Party |
| 1957 | Baishnab Charan Mallick | Praja Socialist Party |
| 1962 | Surendranath Dwivedy | Praja Socialist Party |
| 1967 | Surendranath Dwivedy | Praja Socialist Party |
| 1971 | Surendra Mohanty | Utkal Congress |
| 1977 | Biju Patnaik | Janata Party |
| 1980 | Biju Patnaik | Janata Party (Secular) |
| 1984 | Biju Patnaik | Janata Party |
| 1985^ (Note: Resignation of Biju Patnaik) | Sarat Kumar Deb | Janata Party |
| 1989 | Rabi Ray | Janata Dal |
| 1991 | Rabi Ray | Janata Dal |
| 1996 | Srikant Kumar Jena | Janata Dal |
| 1998 | Prabhat Kumar Samantaray | Biju Janata Dal |
| 1999 | Prabhat Kumar Samantaray | Biju Janata Dal |
| 2004 | Archana Nayak | Biju Janata Dal |
| 2009 | Baijayant Panda | Biju Janata Dal |
| 2014 | Baijayant Panda | Biju Janata Dal |
| 2019 | Anubhav Mohanty | Biju Janata Dal |
| 2024 | Baijayant Panda | Bharatiya Janata Party |

- ^ by-poll

== Election results ==
=== 2024 ===
Voting were held on 1 June 2024 in 7th phase of Indian General Election. Counting of votes was on 4 June 2024. In 2024 election, Bharatiya Janata Party candidate Baijayant Panda defeated Biju Janata Dal candidate Anshuman Mohanty by a margin of 66,536 votes.

2024 Indian general election: Kendrapara
| Party | Candidate | Votes | % | ±% |
|---|---|---|---|---|
| BJP | Baijayant Panda | 615,705 | 48.21 | |
| BJD | Anshuman Mohanty | 5,49,169 | 43.00 | |
| INC | Sidharth Swarup Das | 94,832 | 7.43 | |
| NOTA | None of the above | 5,815 | 0.46 | |
| Majority | | 66,536 | 5.21 | |
| Turnout | | 12,83,464 | 71.47 | |
| BJP gain from BJD | | | | |

=== 2019 ===
In 2019 election, Biju Janata Dal candidate Anubhav Mohanty defeated Bharatiya Janata Party candidate Baijayant Panda by a margin of 1,52,584 votes.

2019 Indian general elections: Kendrapara
| Party | Candidate | Votes | % | ±% |
|---|---|---|---|---|
| BJD | Anubhav Mohanty | 628,939 | 50.87 | ▼1.85 |
| BJP | Baijayant Panda | 4,47,456 | 38.53 | ▲28.13 |
| INC | Dharanidhar Nayak | 1,13,841 | 9.21 | ▼25.19 |
| SP | Rabindra Nath Behera | 5,138 | 0.42 | |
| KP | Srikanta Samal | 1,868 | 0.15 | |
| Independent | Santosh Kumar Das | 1,456 | 0.12 | |
| Independent | Santosh Kumar Patra | 2,281 | 0.18 | |
| NOTA | None of the above | 6,588 | 0.53 | |
| Majority | | 1,52,584 | 12.32 | |
| Turnout | | 12,38,488 | 72.39 | |
| BJD hold | | Swing | ▼13.14 | |

=== 2014 ===
In 2014 election, Biju Janata Dal candidate Baijayant Panda defeated Indian National Congress candidate Dharanidhar Nayak by a margin of 2,09,108 votes.

2014 Indian general elections: Kendrapara
| Party | Candidate | Votes | % | ±% |
|---|---|---|---|---|
| BJD | Baijayant Panda | 601,574 | 52.72 | |
| INC | Dharanidhar Nayak | 3,92,466 | 34.4 | |
| BJP | Bishnu Prasad Das | 1,18,707 | 10.4 | |
| BSP | Sk. Faruk | 6,199 | 0.54 | |
| Independent | Pramod Sahu | 6,193 | 0.54 | |
| AAP | Md. Samim Aktar | 6,029 | 0.53 | |
| Independent | Sukumar Mallick | 2,221 | 0.19 | |
| NOTA | None of the above | 7,610 | 0.67 | |
| Majority | | 2,09,108 | 18.32 | |
| Turnout | | 11,37,607 | 73.14 | |
| Registered electors | | 15,55,444 | | |
| BJD hold | | | | |

=== 2009 ===
In 2009 election, Biju Janata Dal candidate Baijayant Panda defeated Indian National Congress candidate Ranjib Biswal by a margin of 1,27,107 votes.

2009 Indian general elections: Kendrapara
| Party | Candidate | Votes | % | ±% |
|---|---|---|---|---|
| BJD | Baijayant Panda | 502,635 | 35.04 | |
| INC | Ranjib Biswal | 3,75,528 | 26.18 | |
| BJP | Jnandev Beura | 80,392 | 5.6 | |
| Majority | | 1,27,107 | 12.93 | |
| Turnout | | 9,83,010 | 68.53 | |
| BJD hold | | | | |

=== 1957 ===
1957 Indian general election: Kendrapara (Note: It was a 2 member constituency) (Note: Since this was a two-member constituency, there is no majority or swing box. The two highest-polling candidates (Surendranath Dwivedy and Bharrab Chandra Mahanty) are shown as winning candidates.)
| Party | Candidate | Votes | % | ±% |
|---|---|---|---|---|
| PSP | Surendranath Dwivedy | 184,516 | 24.31 | |
| INC | Bharrab Chandra Mahanty | 165,220 | 21.76 | |
| PSP | Baishanab Charan Malik | 157,488 | 20.75 | |
| INC | Laxmidhar Jena | 155,744 | 20.52 | |
| AIGP | Fuzle Haque | 51,786 | 6.82 | |
| IND | Krushna Kanta Ray | 44,392 | 5.85 | |
| Turnout | | 759,146 | 44.46 | |

=== 1952 ===
1952 Indian general election: Kendrapara
| Party | Candidate | Votes | % | ±% |
|---|---|---|---|---|
| INC | Nityananda Kanungo | 84,540 | 48.64 | |
| Socialist | Dhruba Ch. Sahu | 46,488 | 26.75 | |
| KMPP | Jyotish Ch. Lenka | 42,778 | 24.61 | |
| Majority | | 38,052 | 21.89 | |
| Turnout | | 173,806 | 43.38 | |
| INC win (new seat) | | | | |
