= Chairperson of the Central Board of Indirect Taxes and Customs =

Indian government officer

Central Board of Indirect Taxes & Customs
- केंद्रीय अप्रत्यक्ष कर एवं सीमा शुल्क बोर्ड
- Incumbent; Vivek Chaturvedi, IRS (C&CE:90) since 1 December 2025
- Seat: North Block, Secretariat Building, New Delhi
- Appointer: Finance Minister of India; The CBIC Chairperson is usually the senior most IRS (C&IT) officer of the senior most batch. The appointee for the office is approved by Appointments Committee of the Cabinet headed by Prime Minister
- Term length: No fixed tenure is imposed on the office but term can be extended
- Inaugural holder: B.N. Banerji
- Formation: 1964
- Salary: ₹225,000 (US$2,400)
- Website: Official website

Chairperson, Central Board of Indirect taxes and Customs or Chairperson, CBIC is the senior most IRS (C&IT) officer in the Government of India. The Chairperson is the ex officio Secretary to the Government of India and also cadre controlling authority of the Indian Revenue Service (Customs & Indirect Taxes). Vivek Chaturvedi, IRS (C&CE:90) is the present Chairman of Central Board of Indirect Taxes and Customs.

The Chairperson is equivalent to Secretary to Government of India and comes at position number 23 in Order of precedence of India.

The CBIC Chairperson is ex-officio secretary. The Chairman of Central Board of Indirect Taxes and Customs (CBIC) is appointed by Appointments Committee of the Cabinet (ACC) which is headed by the Prime Minister of India.

As the head of federal indirect tax administration, which touches the life of every Indian, the CBIC Chairperson plays a vital role in management of Indian economy and execution of economic policies of the government.

== Emolument, accommodation and perquisites ==
As the Chairperson, CBIC is of the rank of Secretary to Government of India, his/her salary is equivalent to Chief Secretaries of State Governments and to Vice Chief of Army Staff/Commanders, in the rank of Lieutenant General and equivalent ranks in Indian Armed Forces.

Chairperson, CBIC monthly pay and allowances
Base Salary as per 7th Pay Commission (Per month)	Pay Matrix Level	Sources
₹225,000 (US$2,400)	Pay Level 17	

== List of CBIC Chairpersons ==
Chairpersons of Central Board of Indirect Taxes & Customs
S.No.	Name	From	To
44	Vivek Chaturvedi	01.12.2025	Incumbent
43	Sanjay Agarwal	01.08.2023	30.11.2025
42	Vivek Johri	01.12.2021	31.07.2023
41	M. Ajit Kumar	03.02.2020	30.11.2021
40	John Joseph (I/C)	01.01.2020	02.02.2020
39	Pranab K. Das	01.01.2019	1.12.2019
38	S. Ramesh	01.07.2018	31.12.2018
37	Vanaja N. Sarana	01.04.2017	30.06.2018
36	Najib Shah	01.07.2015	31.03.2017
35	Kaushal Srivastava	03.11.2014	30.06.2015
34	J.M. Shanti Sundram	01.02.2014	31.10.2014
33	Praveen Mahajan	01.08.2012	31.01.2014
32	S.K. Goel	31.10.2011	31.07.2012
31	Sumit Dutt Majumder	01.12.2010	31.10.2011
30	V. Sridhar	31.07.2009	30.11.2010
29	P.C. Jha	01.04.2008	31.07.2009
28	S.K. Shingal	31.05.2007	31.03.2008
27	V.P. Singh	01.06.2006	31.05.2007
26	M. Jayaraman	08.07.2005	31.05.2006
25	A. K. Singh	02.06.2003	08.07.2005
24	M.K. Zutshi	21.06.2002	31.05.2003
23	K.L. Verma	31.10.2001	31.05.2002
22	Sukumar Shankar	31.03.2001	31.10.2001
21	B.P. Verma	01.06.2000	31.03.2001
20	S.D. Mohile	17.08.1998	31.05.2000
19	D.S. Solanki	01.04.1998	17.08.1998
18	R. Gopalnathan	04.07.1997	31.03.1998
17	S.D. Mohile	28.02.1997	03.07.1997
16	B.C. Rastogi	01.08.1996	28.02.1997
15	Tarun Roy	26.06.1995	31.07.1996
14	S.A. Govindraj	08.04.1993	30.04.1995
13	K.K. Dwivedi	01.07.1991	31.03.1993
12	B.R. Reddy	01.02.1991	30.06.1991
11	K.L. Rekhi	01.02.1989	31.01.1991
10	M.V.N. Rao	21.12.1987	31.01.1989
9	J. Datta	30.05.1985	21.12.1987
8	R.C. Mishra	12.10.1983	30.05.1985
7	G.S. Sawhney	01.10.1982	11.10.1983
6	S. Venkatesan	01.02.1979	30.09.1982
5	Jasjit Singh	10.12.1977	31.01.1979
4	M.G. Abrol	23.09.1976	09.12.1977
3	Jasjit Singh	28.01.1972	22.09.1976
2	D.P. Anand	14.03.1967	27.01.1972
1	B.N. Banerji	01.01.1964	13.03.1967

== See also ==
- Ministry of Finance (India)#Department of Revenue
- Indian Revenue Service
- Indian Revenue Service (Custom & Indirect Taxes)
- Directorate of Revenue Intelligence
- Taxation in India
- Goods and Services Tax (India)
- Taxation in India#Custom duty
