= Krushak =

Krushak ('Farmer') was an Odia-language weekly newspaper, published from Cuttack, India. Krushak was an organ of the Praja Socialist Party. Krushak was founded by Surendranath Dwivedy, who was the editor of the newspaper for many years. B. Kanungo also served as the editor of the newspaper. By the early 1960s, Krushak claimed a circulation of about 3,000.
