= Central Bureau of Narcotics =

India's Top Anti-Narcotics Agency

Central Bureau of Narcotics केंद्रीय नारकोटिक्स ब्यूरो
- Logo of the Central Bureau of Narcotics

- Flag of Central Bureau of Narcotics
- Common name: CBN

Agency overview
- Preceding agency: Government of India

Jurisdictional structure
- Federal agency: India
- Operations jurisdiction: India
- Primary governing body: Department of Revenue
- Secondary governing body: Ministry of Finance
- General nature: Federal law enforcement

Operational structure
- Overseen by: CBN
- Headquarters: Gwalior, Madhya Pradesh
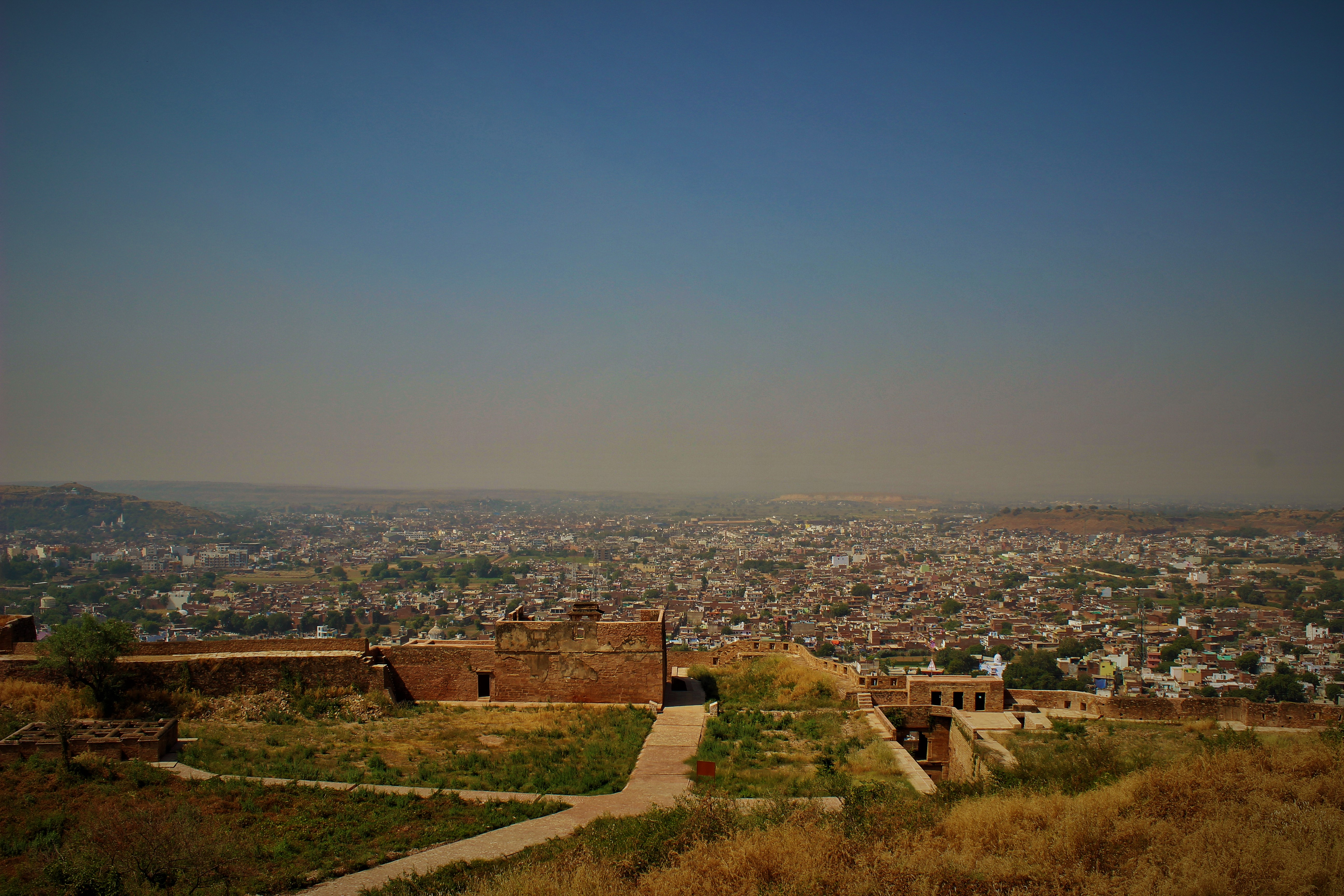
- Elected officer responsible: Nirmala Sitaraman Cabinet Minister
- Agency executive: Dinesh Bisen IRS, Narcotics Commissioner of India
- Parent agency: Ministry of Finance, Department of Revenue, Government of India.
- Units: Narcotics Operations
- Divisions: Neemuch, Mandsaur, Jaora, Kota, Bareilly, Delhi, Indore, Jaipur, Lucknow

Facilities
- Stations: Neemuch, Kota, Lucknow

Website
- https://www.cbn.gov.in

Central Bureau of Narcotics (CBN) is a drug control and regulatory agency operating under the Department of Revenue, Ministry of Finance, Government of India. The main function of CBN is to regulate the legal cultivation of opium poppy in notified areas, licensing of narcotic drugs and controlled substances, regulation of specified imports and exports, and investigation of offences under the Narcotic Drugs and Psychotropic Substances Act, 1985. The Central Bureau of Narcotics headquarters is located at Gwalior. It is considered the oldest anti-drug enforcement unit in India.

== History ==
The origins of the CBN can be traced to the government agencies established to administer India's opium trade. Various opium agencies operated during the colonial period, and their amalgamation led to the establishment of the Opium Department in 1950, which later became known as the Central Bureau of Narcotics. The bureau was initially headquartered in Shimla before its headquarters were transferred to Gwalior in 1960.

Following the enactment of the Narcotic Drugs and Psychotropic Substances Act, 1985 the CBN's responsibilities came to include both regulation of licit narcotics and enforcement against illicit cultivation and trafficking.

== Organization ==
The CBN is headed by the Narcotics Commissioner of India, who belongs to the Indian Revenue Service (IRS) and is the Joint Secretary to the Government of India. The Narcotics Commissioner of India is assisted by three Deputy Narcotics Commissioners (DNC), who are in charge of units in the opium-growing states, such as Madhya Pradesh, Rajasthan and Uttar Pradesh. The Class I officers in the Central Bureau of Narcotics are officers of the Indian Revenue Service (Customs & Central GST). Their offices are located at Neemuch, Kota and Lucknow respectively.

Each unit consists of a number of divisional offices headed by a District Opium Officer (Group 'B' Gazetted Officer), who is in charge of poppy cultivation aspects such as licensing of cultivators, measurement of poppy fields and collection of opium. In addition, there is a Preventive & Intelligence Cell (P&I Cell), which is headed by superintendents (Group 'B' Gazetted Officer). The P&I Cell looks after the enforcement aspects of both the District Opium Officers and Superintendents. Officers report to the Deputy Narcotics Commissioners that heads their Unit.

The Narcotics Commissioner is assisted by two Deputy Narcotics Commissioners (DNCs) and two Assistant Narcotics Commissioners (ANCs), along with other support staff and officers. Along with supervision of opium poppy cultivation, the headquarters office also issues authorisations for the import/export of NDPS and other related work. The office is headed by the Joint/ Additional Commissioner of the Indian Revenue Service (Customs and Central GST), who is designated as Deputy Narcotics Commissioner (DNC). Each unit controls Opium Divisions and Preventive and Intelligence Cells for the supervision of cultivation and effective preventive work. These offices are headed by District Opium Officers and Superintendents respectively.

Each Division is further divided into ranges headed by a Sub-Inspector (SI) officer, who measures the poppy cultivation area in his range. The Range office maintains all the records of licensed poppy cultivators and assists the District Opium Officers in settlement, licensing, measurement, etc. The work of a Range SI is supervised by an Inspector (Cultivation). Each District Opium Officer also has an Inspector (Preventive), who undertakes preventive and enforcement functions in the Division.

The Preventive and Intelligence Cells have been entrusted with the responsibility of enforcing the provisions of the Narcotic Drugs and Psychotropic Substances (NDPS) Act relating to search, seize etc.

== Duties ==
- Supervision over licit cultivation of opium poppy in India spread across 22 Districts 102 Tehsils/Parganas in the States of Madhya Pradesh, Rajasthan and Uttar Pradesh.
- Preventive and enforcement, functions especially in the three poppy-growing States.
- Investigation of cases under the NDPS Act 1985 and filing of complaint in the Court.
- Action for tracing and freezing of illegally acquired property as per the provisions of Chapter V-A of the NDPS Act, 1985.
- Issue of licences for manufacture of synthetic narcotic drugs.
- Issuance of Export Authorizations/ Import Certificate for export/import of Narcotic Drugs and Psychotropic Substances.
- Issuance of No Objection Certificate (NOC) for import/export of selected number of Precursor Chemicals.
- Import of poppy seed or poppy seeds are permitted only for Australia, Austria, France, China, Hungary, the Netherlands, Poland, Slovenia, Spain, Turkey and the Czech Republic on production of an appropriate certificate from the Competent Authority of the exporting country that the opium has been grown licitly/ legally in that country. All import contracts, for this must be registered with the Narcotics Commissioner, Gwalior (Madhya Pradesh) prior to import.

== Field Formations ==
Central Bureau of Narcotics has 17 cultivation divisions situated at Neemuch, Mandsaur, Jaora, Kota, Bareilly, etc. which are headed by District Opium Officer and 16 Preventive and Intelligence Divisions situated at Delhi, Indore, Jaipur, Lucknow, etc. which are headed by Superintendents. The headquarters are situated at Mall Road, Morar in Gwalior (Madhya Pradesh) which is headed by Narcotics Commissioner.

== Regulation of opium cultivation ==
India is one of a limited number of countries authorised under the Single Convention on Narcotic Drugs to cultivate opium poppy for legitimate purposes. Legal cultivation of licit opium is confined to specific notified areas and is conducted under licences issued by the CBN in Madhya Pradesh, Rajasthan and Uttar Pradesh. The process for obtaining license has been digitized through the cbnonline.gov.in portal

Licensed cultivators are subject to controls over the area cultivated and the quantity and quality of opium supplied to the government. Licences are generally renewed according to conditions including the cultivator's previous production and compliance with the prescribed minimum qualifying yield.

The harvested opium is procured through the government-controlled system and is used for the manufacture of pharmaceutical alkaloids such as morphine and codeine or for authorised export.

In 2023, the CBN had seized 70,000 kg of drugs including over 6000 kg of poppy straw.

== See also ==
- Central Excise (India)
- Central Board of Indirect Taxes and Customs
- Directorate of Revenue Intelligence
- Directorate General of GST Intelligence
- Service tax in India
- Value added tax
