= Baijayant Panda =

Member of the Lok Sabha

Vice President of Bharatiya Janata Party
- Incumbent
- Assumed office 8 March 2019
- President: Nitin Nabin

Member of Parliament, Lok Sabha
- Incumbent
- Assumed office 4 June 2024
- Preceded by: Anubhav Mohanty
- In office 22 May 2009 – 19 July 2018
- Preceded by: Archana Nayak
- Succeeded by: Anubhav Mohanty
- Constituency: Kendrapara, Odisha

Member of Parliament, Rajya Sabha
- In office 4 April 2000 – 4 April 2009
- Constituency: Odisha

Personal details
- Born: 12 January 1964 (age 62) Cuttack, Odisha, India
- Party: Bharatiya Janata Party (2019-present)
- Other political affiliations: Biju Janata Dal (2000-2018)
- Spouse: Jagi Mangat Panda (m. 1994)
- Parent: Ila Panda (mother)
- Education: Michigan Technological University
- Profession: Industrialist, politician
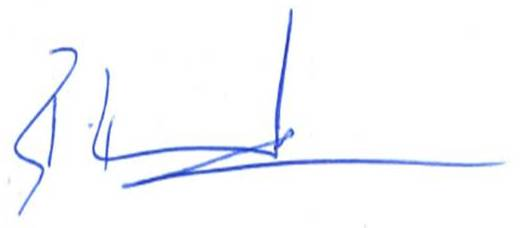
- Signature
- Website: jaypanda.in

Baijayant Panda is an Indian politician. He is the national vice president and spokesperson of the Bharatiya Janata Party (BJP). He was a Member of Parliament in the 15th and 16th Lok Sabha from Kendrapara. He was also a Member of Parliament in the Rajya Sabha for two terms from 2000 to 2009.

Elected from the Kendrapara constituency with a BJD ticket, Panda was suspended from the Biju Janata Dal (BJD) party for alleged anti-party activities on 24 January 2018 and resigned from BJD on 28 May 2018. He alleged there was a conspiracy against him. He joined BJP on 4 March 2019 at New Delhi.

== Political career ==
Baijayant Panda began his political journey in 2000 as a member of the Rajya Sabha, representing Odisha under the Biju Janata Dal (BJD). He served two consecutive terms in the Rajya Sabha until 2009, where he was known for his active participation in various committees and for advocating for the interests of Odisha at the national level. After his tenure in the Rajya Sabha, he was elected to the Lok Sabha from the Kendrapara constituency in Odisha. Panda held this position for two terms, from 2009 to 2018.

In 2018, he was suspended from the BJD for alleged anti-party activities and subsequently resigned from the party. On March 4, 2019, Panda joined the Bharatiya Janata Party (BJP), where he was appointed as the party’s National Vice President and Spokesperson. He returned to the Lok Sabha in 2024, reclaiming his seat from Kendrapara under the BJP banner, marking a significant comeback in his political career.

His contributions to public policy have earned him recognition both within and outside his party, making him a prominent figure in Odisha's political landscape.

== Personal life ==
Baijayant Panda was born on 12 January 1964 in Cuttack to Bansidhar and Ila Panda. He has a degree in Engineering and Management in Communications from the Michigan Technological University.

He married former model-turned industrialist Jagi Mangat Panda on 13 August 1994 who is the managing director of Ortel Communications Ltd. Jagi Mangat Panda is a Punjabi.

In 2019, his debut book Lutyen's Maverick was released in Delhi. It is a collection of Op-Eds and columns that he has been writing since 2009 for major national media outlets including The Times of India.

== Public Causes ==
Besides being active in Parliament and in his constituency, Panda has been championing several key initiatives. Some of his major efforts are given below:

=== Citizens’ Alliance against Malnutrition ===
Panda is a member of the Citizens’ Alliance against Malnutrition, a high level advocacy group composed of young parliamentarians, from various parties and other influential personalities. The goal of the alliance is to raise its voice against malnutrition so that collective national consciousness can be converted into action to eliminate the menace of malnutrition.

As part of the initiative, the alliance members travel across the country, visiting regions with high prevalence of malnutrition. On these visits they meet children, mothers, anganwadi workers, government officials and political leaders to understand why child malnutrition persists. They also raise the issue in different forums.

The work of the alliance prompted the Naandi Foundation to conduct, in 2011, the nation's first ever large scale nutrition survey which captured nutrition data from over 100,000 children and interviewed more than 74,000 mothers. This survey, christened the HUNGaMA (Hunger and Malnutrition) Survey, was released by the Prime Minister in January 2012, at the behest of the alliance.

=== Consultations on plain packaging of tobacco products ===
Panda spearheaded the campaign to reduce the consumption of tobacco products in India.

In December 2012, Australia led the way by becoming the first country to enact a legislation mandating ‘plain’ packaging of tobacco products. Learning from the Australian example, Panda introduced a Private Members’ Bill in the Lok Sabha to stipulate plain packaging of tobacco products. His Bill seeks to increase the size of the health warning and the accompanying graphic to at least 60% of the front and back surfaces of the package. It also prohibits advertisement of tobacco products in warehouses and shops i.e. at the point of sale.

Besides pursuing the matter in Parliament and writing opinion pieces on the issues, Panda has been working closely with the Public Health Foundation of India (PHFI) and Health Related Information Dissemination Amongst Youth (HRIDAY) to organize consultations on issue. One such consultation was organized in Delhi in December 2012 and another in Bhubaneswar in February 2013.

=== Support to the cause of migrant labour ===
In January 2013, the Times of India carried a story alleging exploitation of migrant Odia labourers in brick kilns of Andhra Pradesh. Following these reports, Panda wrote to the National Human Rights Commission (NHRC), the Chief Minister of Andhra Pradesh and the Labour Minister, requesting them to investigate the matter and to ensure that the rights of the workers are protected. On the basis of his letter, the NHRC directed the Chief Secretary, Government of Andhra Pradesh to respond to the complaint with all relevant information.

In April, he pursued the matter further by visiting the brick kilns of Ranga Reddy district, Andhra Pradesh to get a first-hand account of the situation. Panda wrote an article on the depredation of poverty and governance challenge of treating the poor with dignity in life and in death.

=== BJP national vice-president ===
On 8 March 2019, Panda was appointed as the BJP national vice-president and spokesperson. The appointment comes with immediate effect and has been approved by the BJP national president Amit Shah.

== Private Member Bills ==
Panda has introduced a number of Private Members' Bills in Parliament over some very important issues. Some of the bills that he has introduced are:

- The Comptroller and Auditor-General's (Duties, Powers and Conditions of Service) (Amendment) Bill, 2016: It is a bill that strengthens the office of the Comptroller and Auditor-General of India and equips him with such additional powers that may allow him to perform his duties effectively. There is an urgent need to amend the current Act that governs the working of the CAG. The most important changes must include: Bringing contractual agreements and public-private partnerships (PPPs) within the CAG's ambit; giving statutory backing to ‘performance audits’; penalties for not responding to information requests from CAG in time; and time-bound laying of CAG reports in the legislature.
- Fast Track Courts for Elected Representatives Bill, 2013: It is a bill that establishes special Fast Track courts for the trial of cases involving criminal charges against elected representatives. Cases involving elected representatives that are presently being tried across different courts in the country will stand transferred to the Fast Track Courts having jurisdiction in the area. Barring exceptional circumstances, a Fast Track Court shall complete trial within 90 days from the date of filing of charge sheet.
- Representation of People (Amendment) Bill, 2013: It is a Bill to check the criminalisation of politics. It removes the exemption given to sitting MPs, MLAs and MLCs who have been convicted of criminal offences.
- The Representation of People Act (Amendment) Bill 2014: A bill to amend the Representation of People Act to provide that in case a candidate is elected from more than one seat in either House of Parliament or either House of State legislatures (when elections are held in the same election cycle), on his resignation from all but one seat, in the other seats, the candidate securing the second highest number of votes shall be declared elected.
- The Information Technology (Amendment) Bill, 2012: The bill amends Section 66A of the Information Technology (IT) Act to remove restraints on free speech. Given that Section 66A is broadly defined and open to interpretation by the enforcer, it ceases to be ‘reasonable’. The present law needs to be amended in order to narrowly delineate the contours of situations under which free speech on the internet may be restricted. Any attempt to provide our people an atmosphere conducive to healthy debate and deliberation, will have to begin with an amendment of this Act, which strikes at the very root of our democratic values.
- The Indian Penal Code (Amendment) Bill, 2012: This is a Bill to replace section 124A of the Indian Penal Code, the law that penalises Sedition, with a new section that allows for exchange of ideas, however unpopular or radical they may be. It specifically excludes criticism of the Government from the ambit of the section. However, it imposes some reasonable restrictions on the exercise of this freedom by penalizing people who advocate the overthrow of Government by force or violence or by the assassination or kidnapping of Government employees or public representatives. The maximum punishment is also reduced from life imprisonment to seven years.
- Code of Criminal Procedure (Amendment) Bill, 2013: It is a Bill to improve accountability in the appointment of public prosecutors to enable them to function independent of executive and other external influences. Specifically, it aims at increasing accountability and transparency in the appointment of prosecutors to shield them from political interference. The independence of the public prosecutor is essential to ensure a free and fair trial in the court. However, in India, scant attention is paid to this crucial office and its importance is regularly undermined by vested interests in the system.
- The Cigarettes and other Tobacco Products (Amendment) Bill 2012: This is a bill to stipulate ‘plain’ packaging of tobacco products in India. Plain packaging restricts tobacco industry logos, brand imagery, colours and promotional text appearing on packages. Surveys conducted by independent researchers suggest that making tobacco packets drab and unattractive deters young adults and reduces initiation into tobacco use. This Bill removes brand descriptors from packaging and also increases the size of the health warning and the accompanying graphic. In addition, it prohibits advertisement of tobacco products in warehouses and shops at the point of sale.
- Intangible Cultural Heritage (Protection, Preservation and Promotion) Bill, 2013: This Bill provides for the protection, preservation and promotion of various forms of intangible cultural heritage in the country and for matters connected therewith. It paves the way for the creation of autonomous National and State Commissions that will identify forms of intangible cultural heritage; facilitate their protection and promotion by encouraging research and documentation; run information campaigns, establish cultural institutions, support artists and organizations; and ensure their preservation for the original stakeholders i.e. the artisans, performers and the local community.
