= Digit General Insurance =

Digital Insurance service provider in India

- Type: Public company
- Traded as: NSE: GODIGIT, BSE: 544179
- Industry: Insurance
- Founded: 2016; 10 years ago
- Founder: Kamesh Goyal
- Headquarters: Bengaluru, India
- Area served: India
- Products: Health insurance, life insurance, general insurance, car insurance
- Website: www.godigit.com

Digit General Insurance is an Indian general insurance company. It operates as a digital insurer, utilising cloud-based infrastructure to provide coverage for motor, health, travel, property, and marine risks.

It's majority stakes are with Canadian firm Fairfax. It is listed on NSE & BSE Stock Market in 2024. Before Stock listing IRDAI refused Fairfax’s request to convert its Compulsory Convertible Preference Shares (CCPS) in parent company into equity shares. It provides user in India with insurance.

== History ==
It was originally started in 2016 by Kamesh Goyal, under the name Oben General Insurance. In June 2017, it rebranded to Go Digit General Insurance to align with its technology-driven model. The insurer received its certificate of registration from the Insurance Regulatory and Development Authority of India (IRDAI) in September 2017.

The organisation expanded its initial years, after the funding in 2021. In the same year ex Indian cricket captain Virat Kohli was appointed as the brand ambassador. By late 2023, they established a presence across 24 states and union territories, supported by a network of over 61,000 distribution partners.

== Stock exchange listing ==
They launched their initial public offering (IPO) in May 2024, raising a total of ₹2,614.65 crore. The stock is listed on the National Stock Exchange (NSE) at ₹286, & Bombay Stock Exchange BSE, the shares opened at ₹281.10. It helps users for car insurance, bike insurance, commercial vehicle insurance, health insurance, travel insurance etc.

== Regulatory and legal issues ==
- The company has been subject to specific regulatory actions by the IRDAI regarding compliance and product filings. In 2021, the regulator directed Go Digit to withdraw its "Digit Group Total Protect Policy" because the product offered benefits that were classified under life insurance, a domain outside the scope of a general license. This directive was later upheld by the Securities Appellate Tribunal (SAT).
- May 2024, the IRDAI imposed a penalty of ₹1 crore on the company. The fine was levied due to the non-disclosure of a change in the conversion ratio of compulsorily convertible preference shares (CCPS) issued by its parent entity to FAL Corporation, a Fairfax subsidiary. Additionally, in October 2024, the company received a show-cause notice from the regulator for exceeding the prescribed limits on management expenses for the financial year 2023–24.
- In March 2026, Go Digit General Insurance received a GST demand order of about Rs 170 crore for alleged short payment of tax over nearly five years and plans to appeal the order.
- In May 2026, Go Digit General Insurance received a show-cause notice from the DGGI seeking ₹20.51 crore over alleged ineligible input tax credit claims between September 2022 and March 2024. The company said that no final order had been issued and that it would respond to the notice.

== See also ==
- Life Insurance Corporation of India
- HDFC Life
- ICICI Prudential Life Insurance
