= Prabhat Kumar Samantaray =

Indian politician (1950–2024)

Member of Parliament, Lok Sabha
- In office 28 February 1998 – 18 May 2004
- Preceded by: Srikant Kumar Jena
- Succeeded by: Archana Nayak
- Constituency: Kendrapara, Odisha

Personal details
- Born: 22 April 1950 Shasanipara, Patakur, Kendrapara district, Orissa, India
- Died: 17 October 2024 (aged 74) Bhubaneswar, Odisha, India
- Party: Biju Janata Dal
- Other political affiliations: Janata Dal
- Spouse: Prativa Manjari Mahanty

Prabhat Kumar Samantaray (22 April 1950 – 17 October 2024) was an Indian politician. He was elected to the Lok Sabha, the lower house of the Parliament of India from Kendrapara, Odisha as a member of the Biju Janata Dal, died in Bhubaneswar on 17 October 2024, at the age of 74.
