= Rajanagar Assembly constituency =

Constituency of the Odisha legislative assembly in India

Coordinates: 20.58°N 86.34°E

Rajanagar
- Constituency No. 99 for the Odisha Legislative Assembly

Constituency details
- Country: India
- Region: East India
- State: Odisha
- Division: Central Division
- District: Kendrapara
- Lok Sabha constituency: Kendrapara
- Established: 1951
- Total electors: 2,62,707 (Note: as on 2024) (Note: as data published by election commission)
- Reservation: None

Member of Legislative Assembly
- 17th Odisha Legislative Assembly
- Incumbent Dhruba Charan Sahoo
- Party: Biju Janata Dal
- Elected year: 2024

Rajanagar is a Vidhan Sabha constituency of Kendrapara district, Odisha.

This constituency includes Pattamundai (M), Rajanagar block and 18 Gram panchayats (Bachhara, Srirampur, Damarpur, Sansarphal, Khanata, Oupada, Chandanagar, Sasana, Dosia, Khadianta, Gangarampur, Aradapali, Sanjharia, Badapada, Bilikana, Badamohanpur, Dihudipur and Balabhadrapur) of Pattamundai block.

== Elected members ==
Vote share of winning candidates
2024	46.46%
2019	45.81%
2014	49%
2009	48.15%
2004	52.11%
2000	71.11%
1995	53.40%
1990	59.20%
1985	50.85%
1980	55.93%
1977	59.09%

Since its formation in 1951, 18 elections have been held here till date including one bypoll in 1971.

List of members elected from Rajanagar constituency are:

Year	Member	Party
2024	Dhruba Charan Sahoo	Biju Janata Dal
2019	Dhruba Charan Sahoo	Biju Janata Dal
2014	Anshuman Mohanty	Indian National Congress
2009	Alekh Kumar Jena	Biju Janata Dal
2004	Nalinikanta Mohanty	Indian National Congress
2000	Nalinikanta Mohanty	Biju Janata Dal
1995	Nalinikanta Mohanty	Janata Dal
1990	Nalinikanta Mohanty	Janata Dal
1985	Nalinikanta Mohanty	Janata Party
1980	Nalinikanta Mohanty	Lok Dal
1977	Nalinikanta Mohanty	Janata Party
1974	Biju Patnaik	Utkal Congress
1971 (bypoll) (Note: Resignation of Prahlad Mallik)	Biju Patnaik	Utkal Congress
1971	Prahlad Mallik	Utkal Congress
1967	Raja Sailendra Narayan Bhanja Deo	Independent politician
1961	Padma Charan Naik	Praja Socialist Party
1957	Ananta Charan Tripathy	Independent politician
1951	Saraswati Devi	Indian National Congress

== Election results ==
=== 2024 ===
Voting were held on 1st June 2024 in 4th phase of Odisha Assembly Election & 7th phase of Indian General Election. Counting of votes was on 4th June 2024. In 2024 election, Biju Janata Dal candidate Dhruba Charan Sahoo defeated Bharatiya Janata Party candidate Lalit Kumar Behera by a margin of 18,241 votes.

2024 Odisha Vidhan Sabha Election, Rajanagar
Party	Candidate	Votes	%	±%
BJD	Dhruba Charan Sahoo	81,237	46.46	
BJP	Lalit Kumar Behera	62,996	36.03	
INC	Ashok Kumar Pratihari	26,299	15.04	
NOTA	None of the above	791	0.45	
Majority		18,241	10.43	
Turnout		1,74,840	66.55	
BJD hold				

=== 2019 ===
In 2019 election, Biju Janata Dal candidate Dhruba Charan Sahoo defeated Indian National Congress candidate Anshuman Mohanty by a margin of 18,408 votes.

2019 Odisha Vidhan Sabha Election, Rajanagar
Party	Candidate	Votes	%	±%
BJD	Dhruba Charan Sahoo	78,926	45.81	
INC	Anshuman Mohanty	60,518	35.13	
BJP	Alekh Kumar Jena	27,134	15.75	
NOTA	None of the above	716	0.42	
Majority		18,408	10.68	
Turnout		1,72,286	70.48	
BJD gain from INC				

=== 2014 ===
In 2014 election, Indian National Congress candidate Anshuman Mohanty defeated Biju Janata Dal candidate Dhruba Charan Sahoo by a margin of 5,429 votes.

2014 Odisha Vidhan Sabha Election, Rajanagar
Party	Candidate	Votes	%	±%
INC	Anshuman Mohanty	76,806	49	
BJD	Dhruba Charan Sahoo	71,377	45.54	
BJP	Jnandev Beura	6632	4.23	
NOTA	None of the above	976	0.62	
Majority		5,429	3.46	
Turnout		1,56,747	71.2	
INC gain from BJD				

=== 2009 ===
In 2009 election, Biju Janata Dal candidate Alekh Kumar Jena defeated Indian National Congress candidate Nalinikanta Mohanty by a margin of 4,335 votes.

2009 Odisha Vidhan Sabha Election, Rajanagar
Party	Candidate	Votes	%	±%
BJD	Alekh Kumar Jena	63,683	48.15	
INC	Nalinikanta Mohanty	59,348	44.87	
BJP	Bijay Ketan Swain	6,661	5.04	
Majority		4,335	3.28 (Note: % of total valid votes)	
Turnout		1,32,275	68.70	
Registered electors		1,92,554		
BJD gain from INC				
