= Simharajapuram =

Village in Andhra Pradesh, India

Simharajapuram (also known locally as Kosarapalli) is a village situated in the Palasamudram Mandal of Chittoor district in the Indian state of Andhra Pradesh. It is part of the Rayalaseema region and lies near the border with Tamil Nadu.

simharajapuram

== Geography ==
The village is located approximately 40 kilometers east of Chittoor, the district headquarters, and about 5 kilometers from Palasamudram, the mandal headquarters. Simharajapuram spans an area of 190 hectares and is surrounded by agricultural lands. A pond (cheruvu) is situated to the southeast of the village. Nearby rivers include the Pedda Vanka and Arani River. The village is accessible via National Highways NH716 and NH69.

=== Demographics ===
As per the 2011 Census of India, Simharajapuram has a population of 982 individuals residing in 233 households. The gender distribution is fairly balanced, with 497 males and 485 females, resulting in a sex ratio of approximately 975 females per 1000 males. The overall literacy rate stands at 58.86%, with male literacy at 65.39% and female literacy at 52.16%.

The village has a significant Scheduled Caste (SC) population, comprising 301 individuals, which is about 30.65% of the total population. There is no recorded Scheduled Tribe (ST) population in the village.

=== Administration ===
Simharajapuram functions as a Gram Panchayat within the Palasamudram Mandal. The village falls under the Palasamudram Assembly and Parliament Constituency. The PIN code for Simharajapuram is 517599, and the postal services are managed through the Vengalrajukuppam post office.

=== Education ===
Educational facilities in Simharajapuram include:

- MPUPS Simharajapuram: A government primary and upper primary school.

For higher education, students typically travel to nearby towns:

- Government Junior College, Palasamudram: Located approximately 6 km away.
- Colleges and vocational training institutes in Chittoor and Tirupati, situated more than 40 km from the village.

=== Culture and Landmarks ===
Simharajapuram is home to a historic Ellaiamman temple which has 200 years history.

=== Nearby Places ===
Neighboring villages include Krishnajammapuram, Srikaverirajupuram, Vengalrajukuppam, Vanadurgapuram, and Padmapuram. The nearest towns and cities are Sholingur, Nagari, Tiruttani, and Puttur. Simharajapuram is located near the border of Chittoor district and Thiruvallur district of Tamil Nadu.
