= Ila Panda =

Indian politician

Member of Parliament, Rajya Sabha
- In office 1992-1998
- Constituency: Odisha

Personal details
- Born: 26 October 1932
- Died: 11 January 2005 (aged 72)
- Party: Janata Dal
- Spouse: Bansidhar Panda
- Children: Baijayant Panda, Paramita Mahapatra, Subhrakant Panda, Nita Ganapati

Ila Panda (26 October 1932 – 11 January 2005) was an Indian politician She was a Member of Parliament, representing Odisha in the Rajya Sabha the upper house of India's Parliament as a member of the Janata Dal.
