= PanIIT Alumni India =

Indian nonprofit

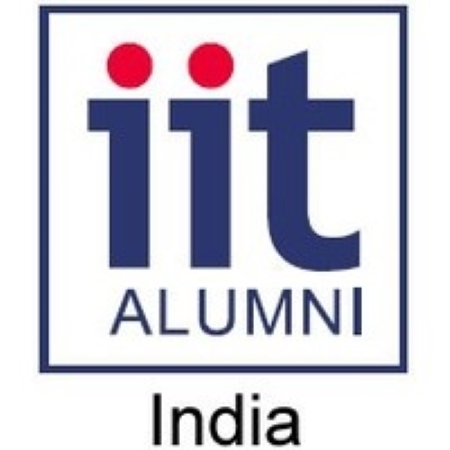
- Abbreviation: PanIIT
- Formation: 2002, registered 2006
- Type: Nonprofit organization Alumni association
- Legal status: Registered society
- Headquarters: New Delhi, India
- Region served: All IIT campuses (India)
- Chairman: Prabhat Kumar (2025‑2027)

PanIIT Alumni India (commonly known as PanIIT) is a non-profit alumni federation representing alumni from all 23 Indian Institutes of Technology (IITs).

The organisation is registered as a society in New Delhi under the Societies Registration Act, 1860. PanIIT acts as an umbrella body for alumni associations of all 23 IIT campuses.

== History ==
PanIIT Alumni India was established in 2006, it was created to facilitate collaboration among alumni of the Indian Institutes of Technology (IITs) across academic, professional, and policy-related initiatives. The initiative received early support from prominent IIT alumni, including Rajat Gupta, who advocated engagement of alumni with higher education and public policy discussions in India.

== Structure and governance ==
PanIIT Alumni India serves as an umbrella organisation representing alumni of the Indian Institutes of Technology (IITs). Its organisational structure includes an executive council with elected office bearers responsible for overseeing its activities. Office bearers are elected for fixed terms, and the organisation’s activities are supported by a combination of volunteer participation and administrative coordination.

== Leadership ==
PanIIT Alumni India is governed by an Executive Council composed of representatives from various IITs. Members are elected for fixed terms, ensuring representation from both older and newer institutes. As of 2025, the council’s leadership includes:

Name	Position	IIT Campus	
Prabhat Kumar	Chairman	IIT Delhi	1991
Dr. Amitabh Ranjan	Vice Chairman	IIT (ISM) Dhanbad	1993
Rajeev Singh	General Secretary	IIT Roorkee	1992
Ashish Kela	Treasurer	IIT Bombay	2006

== Activities ==
PanIIT Alumni India organises conferences, summits, and alumni engagement programmes focused on technology, entrepreneurship, education, and public policy. These activities are typically conducted in collaboration with IIT campuses, industry participants, and government stakeholders.

Major initiatives and events include:

Event	Year	Location	Focus / Highlights	References
Pan IIT Conclave	2010	Greater Noida	Early national-level conclave bringing together IIT alumni, academia, and industry stakeholders.	
Pan IIT Alumni Leadership Series	2013	IIT Madras	Leadership and entrepreneurship discussions involving senior IIT alumni and industry leaders.	
Pan IIT Conclave	2019	IIT Delhi	Focused on artificial intelligence, public policy, and societal implications of emerging technologies.	
PanIIT World of Technology (PIWOT) - Global Technology Summit	2023	Bengaluru	Large-scale technology summit featuring startup showcases, hackathons, and industry participation.	
PanIIT World of Technology (PIWOT)	2025	Mumbai	Third edition of PIWOT focusing on technology innovation, entrepreneurship, and policy engagement.	
PIWOT Satellite Event	2025	IIT Guwahati	Regional satellite event emphasising rural empowerment and innovation-led development.	
Pan IIT Rising Rajasthan Summit on AI and Innovation	2025	Jaipur	Inaugural summit centred on artificial intelligence, innovation, and emerging technologies.	
PanIIT Tech4Bharat Summit	2026	New Delhi	Summit theme was technology-led growth roadmap towards achieving the vision of Viksit Bharat by 2047.	
PanIIT Summit on Artificial Intelligence (AI)	2026	Hyderabad	Summit centred on AI-led transformation for Bharat	
Pan IIT Global Leadership Summit	2026	New Delhi	Scheduled summit focusing on technology, investment, governance, and diplomacy.	
PanIIT Andhra Pradesh Summit 2026	2026	Vijayawada	Summit centered on deep tech, quantum computing, green enerrgy, semiconductors and emerging technologies.	

== Impact and Public Service ==
Beyond alumni networking, PanIIT Alumni India has participated in initiatives related to technology policy discussions, innovation ecosystems, and educational outreach. Its conferences have served as forums for dialogue among academics, industry professionals, and policymakers on emerging technologies and their societal implications.

During the COVID-19 pandemic, PanIIT-associated groups collaborated with IIT alumni networks to support digital education initiatives and healthcare-related outreach, including virtual conferences focused on pandemic response and recovery. The organisation has also supported mentoring and ideation programmes aimed at students and early-stage innovators, connecting participants with IIT alumni for guidance and evaluation.

== See also ==
- Indian Institutes of Technology
- Education in India
- Alumni association
