= Baishnab Charan Patnaik =

Indian politician

Member of Parliament, Lok Sabha
- In office 1962–1967
- Preceded by: Surendra Mohanty
- Succeeded by: Kamakhya Prasad Singh Deo
- Constituency: Dhenkanal, Odisha

Personal details
- Born: 29 April 1914 Dhenkanal, Odisha, British India
- Died: 1 January 2013 (aged 98)
- Party: Communist Party of India
- Other political affiliations: Indian National Congress
- Spouse: Annapurna Patnaik

Baishnab Charan Patnaik (1914-2013) was an Indian politician. He was elected to the Lok Sabha, the lower house of the Parliament of India.

== Career ==
Inspired by Netaji Subhas Chandra Bose as well as the founding members of the Communist Party of India, Patnaik was one of the vanguards during the Quit India Movement, where he led an armed revolt against the British Raj and took hold of the administration of Dhenkanal for over a week. He led a procession of people to set fire to the Madhi police station and fought with the British police force. Patnaik then disguised himself as a dead body and escorted to a funeral pyre at the Brahmani River, where he escaped by a boat. While he was on treatment at Kolkata, he joined the Communist Party of India.

Patnaik also carried out underground operations and was jailed from 1939 to 1942 and again from 1948 to 1952. While he was in prison, Patnaik was elected as a Communist Party MLA in 1952.

As a member of the first Vidhan Sabha of Odisha and third Lok Sabha, his work contributed towards the reconstruction of the nation in the early phase of its republic.

== Personal life ==
Patnaik was born on April 29, 1914. He was expelled from high school when he joined the civil disobedience movement in 1931.

He was a well-spoken and popular orator and artist. He successfully spread hand-written party literature and cyclostyled materials, which resulted in him being declared as one of the most dangerous revolutionaries by the British and the King; an award of 3,200 rupees was declared for his arrest to catch him ‘dead or alive’.

He died on January 1, 2013, at his residence in Chandan Bazar of Dhenkanal town, Odisha.
