= Surendra Mohanty =

Odia writer, politician

Member: Rajya Sabha
- In office 3 April 1978 – 2 April 1984

Member: 5th Lok Sabha
- In office 1971–1977
- Preceded by: Surendranath Dwivedy
- Succeeded by: Biju Patnaik
- Constituency: Kendrapara

Member: 2nd Lok Sabha
- In office 1957–1962
- Succeeded by: Baishnab Charan Patnaik
- Constituency: Dhenkanal

Member: Rajya Sabha
- In office 3 April 1952 – 23 March 1957

Personal details
- Born: Surendra Mohanty; 21 June 1922 Purusottampur village, Cuttack District, Odisha
- Died: 21 December 1990 (aged 68) Satichoura, Cuttack
- Party: Ganatantra Party
- Other political affiliations: Ganatantra Parishad, Congress
- Spouse: Renuka Mohanty
- Children: Lopamudra Mohanty, Jitamitra Mohanty & Pushpamitra Mohanty
- Awards: Padma Shri, Orissa Sahitya Academy Award, Sarala Award,
- Website: Official Website

Surendra Mohanty (21 June 1922- 21 December 1990) born in Odisha was an Indian author who wrote in Odia. He was the recipient of the Central Sahitya Academy Award for his novel Nilashaila.

== Career ==
He was the president of Odisha Sahitya Academy from 1981 to 1987. He was also the first editor, and later chief editor for the newspaper The Sambad. He is a writer of short stories, novels, travelogues, criticism and biographies. He wrote around 50 books belonging to different genres. His well-known books are Mahanagarira Ratri (The Night of the Metropolis), Maralara Mrutyu (The Death of a Swan), Andha Diganta (The Dark Horizon), and Mahanirvana (The Final Departure). Yadubamsa O Anyaanya Galpa (The Yadubamsa and other stories), Rajadhani O Anyaanya Galpa (The Capital and other stories), Krushnachuda (The Gulmohur) and Ruti O Chandra (The Bread and The Moon) are his famous short stories.

Apart from being a litterateur, he was also active in politics. He was a member of Ganatantra Parishad. He was elected as a member of parliament in 1957 from Dhenkanal on Ganatantra parishad ticket. Later he joined Utkal Congress and was elected from Kendrapada constituency in 1971.

== Awards ==
- Sahitya Akademi Award, 1957; for Sabujapatra O Dhusara Golap.
- Sharala Award, 1980; for Kulabrudha.
- Central Sahitya Academy Award for Nila Saila( Blue Hill).
- Sahitya Akademi Award, 1987; for Patha O Pruthibi.

== Selected works ==
The four novels of Surendra Mohanty that are based on history, myth and legends are Nilasaila (Blue hill) published in 1968, Niladri Bijaya (Triumphant return to Niladri) published in 1980, Krushnavenire Sandhya (Evening on the banks of river Krishna) published in 1985 and Ajibakara Attahasa (Ajibaka's satiric laughter)published in 1987.

=== Nilasahiila ===
The most widely read and acclaimed is "Nilasaila" which is contextualized in a crucial period of Orissa's history. The events of the novel take place between the years 1727 and 1736 when Ramachandradev, the king of Khurda who is revered by the people of Orissa as the representative of Jagannath, the presiding deity of the Oriya race, converts himself into Islam and marries the daughter of the Muslim ruler of Cuttack. But when the Muslim ruler of Cuttack invades Khurda and tries to destroy the idol of Lord Jagannath, Ramachandradev fights bravely to protect the idol which symbolizes Oriya identity and sentiment. The novel gives a truthful account of contemporary Orissa, but it is more than history. It is an intense portrayal of the religious and cultural tradition of Orissa which is still an integral part of Oriya racial consciousness.

=== Niladri Bijaya ===
While Nilasaila ends with the idol of Lord Jagannath being shifted from its original place, the ratna singhasana of Puri temple, to an island in the Chilika Lake, "Niladri Bijaya" narrates the triumphant return of the idol to its original abode. Though Ramachandradev is formally a Muslim, he is eager to restore the deity to the original place and he succeeds despite the fear of being attacked by the Muslim forces. The novel ends on a tragic note when Ramachandradev and his wife are debarred from entering the temple as being non-Hindus.

=== Krushnavenire Sandhya ===
The novel "Krushnavenire Sandhya", deals with another crucial period of Orissa's history when in the early sixteenth century, Prataprudradev, the king of Orissa, loses the battle with Krushnadeva Ray, the ruler of the Vijaynagar empire. Prataprudra is forced to surrender after his son Birabhadra commits suicide in the prison. Krushnadeva Ray, who is older than Prataprudra, marries his daughter Jaganmohini as a condition of the peace treaty. Prataprudra, in frustration and anguish, turns to spiritual life and becomes an ardent follower of Sri Chaitanya.

=== Ajibakara Attahasa ===
"Ajibakara Attahasa" is set in the third century BC when Buddhism was in a state of decadence, eventually culminating in its bifurcation into the Mahayana and Hinayana sects. The novel questions the Buddhist tenets of austerity and self-control and questions the traditional estimate of emperor Ashoka as a great votary of peace and spiritual life. This novel depicts Ashoka as a strategist who professed Buddhism to keep his subjects meek and submissive. It is an irony of history, the novel suggests, that Ashoka who killed lakhs of Oriyas in the Kalinga war is idolized as a great hero and a model king.

== Complete list of works ==
ଉପନ୍ୟାସ

- ଅନ୍ଧ ଦିଗନ୍ତ
- ନୀଳଶୈଳ
- Kalantara
- Niladri vijaya
- Neti Neti
- Achalatana
- ଦୁଇ ସୀମାନ୍ତ
- ବନ୍ଧୁ ଓ ପ୍ରିୟା
- College Boy
- HamsaGitee
- କୃଷ୍ଣ ବେଣୀରେ ସନ୍ଧ୍ୟା
- Ajibakara Attahasa

Biographies

- ପଥ ଓ ପୃଥିବୀ
- କୁଳବୃଦ୍ଧ
- ଶତାବ୍ଦ ର ସୂର୍ଯ

କ୍ଷୁଦ୍ର ଗଳ୍ପ

- Nayanpur express
- କୃଷ୍ଣ ଚୂଡା
- ମହାନଗରୀର ରାତ୍ରୀ
- Ruti O Chandra
- ସବୁଜ ପତ୍ର ଓ ଧୂସର ଗୋଲାପ
- କବି ଓ ନର୍ତ୍ତକୀ
- Maralara Mrutyu
- Mahanirvana
- ଯଦୁବଂଶ ଓ ଅନ୍ୟନ୍ୟ ଗଳ୍ପ
- ରାଜଧାନୀ ଓ ଅନ୍ୟାନ୍ୟ ଗଳ୍ପ
- ଶେଷ କବିତା
- ଶେଷ ସ୍ତମ୍ଭ
