= Gorantla, Sri Sathya Sai district =

Gorantla
- Village
- Interactive map of Gorantla
- Location in Andhra Pradesh, India
- Coordinates: 13.9892°N 77.7703°E
- Country: India
- State: Andhra Pradesh
- District: Sri Sathya Sai

Area
  - Total: 4.36 km^{2} (1.68 sq mi)
- Elevation: 8,436 m (27,677 ft)

Population (2020)
  - Total: 34,271
  - Density: 7,860/km^{2} (20,400/sq mi)

Telugu
  - Official: Telugu
- Time zone: UTC+5:30 (IST)
- PIN: 515231
- 515231: 08556
- Vehicle registration: AP 02

Gorantla is a village and mandal headquarters on the banks of the Chitravathi River in the Sri Sathya Sai district of the state of Andhra Pradesh, India. The village is around 120 km from Bengaluru and is well-connected with National Highway 44 (India). Gorantla is home to the historical Madhavaraya Temple (dedicated to Vishnu) built in the year 1354 A.D. by Narasimha Saluva of the Vijaya Nagar Empire. This temple ranks first among centrally protected monuments of national importance. The city is also known for its silk sarees, masala dosa and more.

== History of Madhavaraya Temple ==
According to the district gazette and the Mysore Epigraphical Report of 1912, the temple was built by King Narasimha of the Saluva dynasty of the Vijayanagara Empire in Saka 1276 (1354 A.D). Between the period 1610 and 1904, the nose of the presiding deity (idol of Madhavaraya Swamy) was broken, making the idol ineligible for worship and disrupting the daily rituals of the temple. The temple was declared a protected monument by the colonial British government.

=== Architecture ===
The temple consists of a small shrine chamber, a large central hall enclosed with walls, and a large pillared mandapa in the front. The most ornamented portion of the building is the pillared porch in front. The plain portions of the massive pillars are decorated with bas-relief sculptures representing scenes from Ramayana and the Puranas. The entrances are richly carved with Vaishnava figures. The Garbha Griha features a small image of Lord Madavaraya. A large stepped well in front of the temple contains holy water believed to be beneficial by the locals for treating skin diseases. The historical site is full of sculptures and the Pillared Mandapa is renowned for its numerous stone carvings. A lush green park surrounding the temple is used by locals for recreational purposes.

== Religious importance ==
Residents of Gorantla practice a variety of religions.

Hindu Temples: Madhavaraya Temple, Varasidhi Vinayaka Temple, Chowdeshwari Devi Temple, Kanyaka Parameshwari Temple, Gangamma Temple, Rama & Shiva Alayam and Anjineyaswamy Temple are visited by many pilgrims.

Mosques: Jama Masjid and Madina masjid are often attended by Muslims from surrounding areas. There are at least 10 mosques in town.

Churches: There are a few churches available, namely C&IG and Baetal Church.

== Transportation ==
Gorantla is well-connected with National Highway 44 (NH 44), which passes within the mandal limits and connects to the state highway between Hindupur and Tirupati. Buses are available between Gorantla and Bangalore, Hindupur, Kadiri, Dharmavaram, Anantapur, Tirupathi, Chennai, Kadapa, Hyderabad, and Vijayawada.

The nearest railway station is SSPN Railway Station, which is about 20 km from the town.

The nearest operational airport is Kempegowda International Airport, Bangalore, which is located about 100 km from the town.

Krishnapatnam Port is located around 300 km from the town.

== Vendors and services ==
Gorantla is famous for its critically acclaimed masala dosa and dosala mohan, egg dosa T VENKATESH near RTC BUSTAND roadsoda and mirchi bajji are also available for food enthusiasts. Khan's ka Biryani is a newly popular dish from the area.There are two operational hotels, which can be found near the bus stop.

There are 10 function halls, including Raj Convention Hall, Vasavi, TTD, Ranga Mahal, and SVT.

Gorantla has a police station that dates back to the pre-independence era. The C.I and the S.I enforce law and order in the town.

- Current C.I. - Jaya Naik (9440796837)
- Current S.I. - Sreenivasulu (9440901876)

Assembly Constituency:

2004	Pamudurthi Ravindra Reddy	INC	58909
1999	Kristappa Nimmala	TDP	54971
1994	N Kristappa	TDP	56223
1989	Ravindra Reddy Pamudurthi	INC	49457
1985	Kesanna Veluri	TDP	45677
1983	Kessana V	IND	45280
1978	P Bayapa Reddy	INC(I)	27039
1972	P Ravindra Reddy	IND	33888

Fuel Stations: Sahastra, Vinayaka, Aditya and Indian Oil

== Geography ==
Gorantla is located at 13.9892°N 77.7703°E. It has an average elevation of 646 metres (2,119 ft).

== Demographics ==
According to the Indian census, the population of the village was 34,271 in 2019, with a male population of 14,771 and a female population of 14,655. 4,845 children are under 6 years of age. The average literacy rate is 69.8%.

== Economy ==
The economy of the town is dependent on the weaving industry, predominantly the manufacturing of sarees by power looms. Another major source of income is agriculture. Farmers depend on rainwater due to the lack of water resources. A major crop in this area is ground nuts.
