= Prabath =

Prabath is a given name and surname. Notable people with the name include:

== Given name ==
- Prabath Dematanpitiya (fl. 1985), Chief of Staff of Sri Lanka Army
- Prabath de Zoysa (born 1999), Sri Lankan cricketer
- Prabath Jayasuriya (born 1991), Sri Lankan cricketer
- Prabath Nissanka (born 1980), Sri Lankan cricketer

== Surname ==
- Danuka Prabath (born 1994), Sri Lankan cricketer
- Hashan Prabath (born 1992), Sri Lankan cricketer
