= Dhruba Charan Sahoo =

Indian politician

Member of Odisha Legislative Assembly
- Incumbent
- Assumed office 2019
- Preceded by: Anshuman Mohanty
- Constituency: Rajanagar

Personal details
- Party: Biju Janata Dal
- Profession: Politician

Dhruba Charan Sahoo is an Indian politician who was elected to the Odisha Legislative Assembly from Rajanagar as a member of the Biju Janata Dal.
