= Anshuman Mohanty =

Indian politician

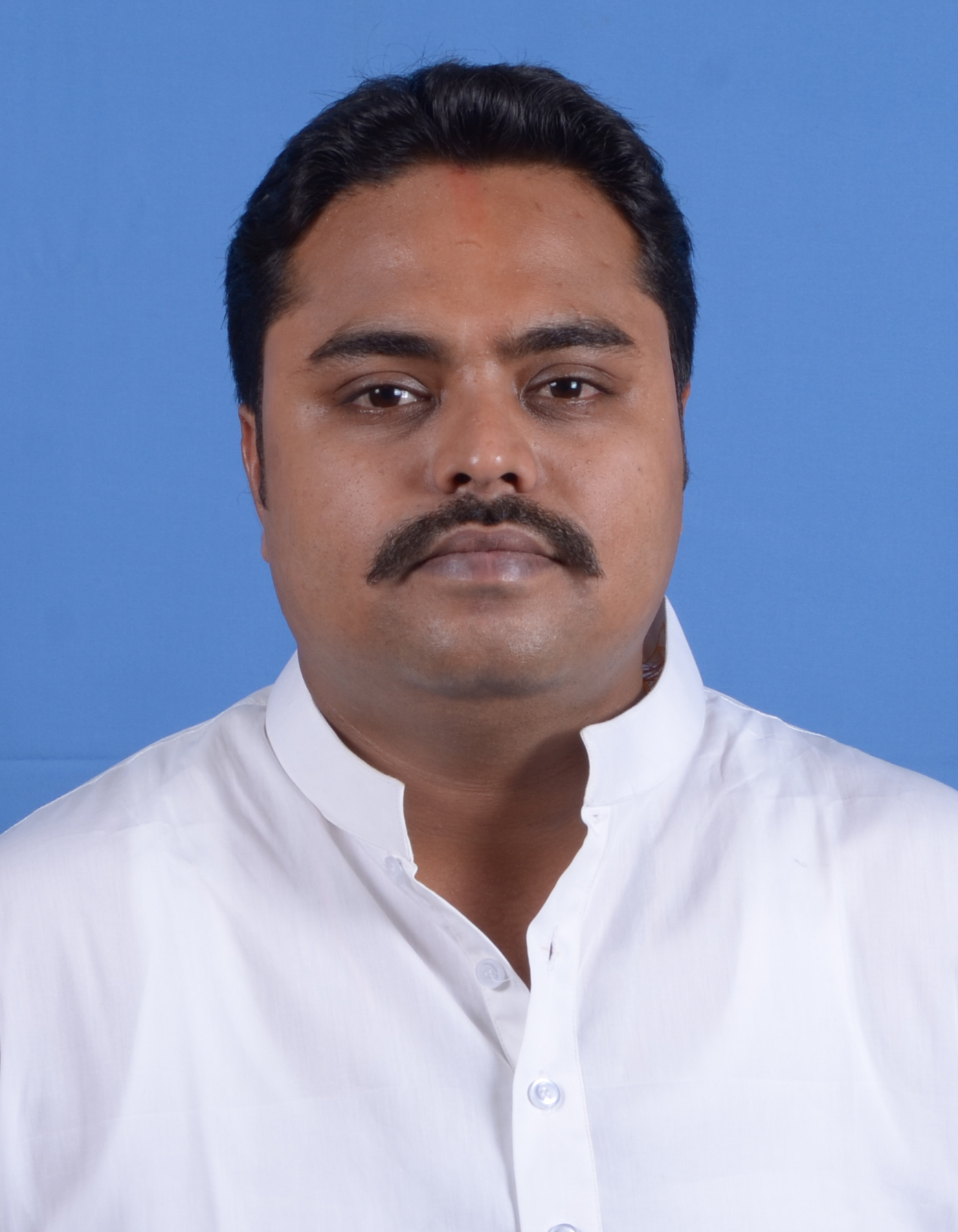
- Portrait of Anshuman Mohanty

Member of Odisha Legislative Assembly
- In office 2014–2019
- Preceded by: Alekh Kumar Jena
- Succeeded by: Dhruba Charan Sahoo
- Constituency: Rajnagar, Odisha

Anshuman Mohanty (born November 7, 1983), is a politician, engineer, entrepreneur and former information technician. In 2014 he was elected MLA (Member of the Legislative Assembly (India)) from Rajanagar (Odisha Vidhan Sabha constituency) Odisha.

== Personal life ==
Anshuman is the son of deceased cabinet Minister Nalini Kanta Mohanty.

He received a Bachelor of Technology in Electronic Engineering from the Institute of Technical Education & Research under Utkal University in 2005.

He then worked in the Information Technology field before entering politics.

== Politics ==
He won his first election in the State Assembly Elections in 2014.

== See also ==
- Election Reference
- Candidature Announced
