= Surendranath Dwivedy =

Indian politician, journalist, and social worker (1913–2001)

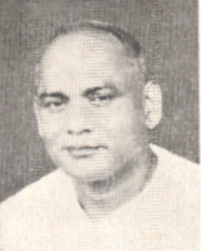

Governor, Arunachal Pradesh
- In office 26 March 1991 – 4 July 1993
- Preceded by: Lokanath Mishra
- Succeeded by: Madhukar Dighe

Member: 2nd, 3rd and 4th Lok Sabha
- In office 1957–1970
- Succeeded by: Surendra Mohanty
- Constituency: Kendrapara

Member, Rajya Sabha
- In office 1952–1956

Personal details
- Born: Surendranath Dwivedy; 11 February 1913 Khanda Sahi, Cuttack District, Odisha
- Died: 1 October 2001 (aged 88) Rourkela
- Party: Praja Socialist Party
- Other political affiliations: Congress, Congress Socialist Party
- Spouse: Gayatri Dwivedy
- Children: Niharbala Mishra ( Nina)
- Education: Ravenshaw Collegiate School
- Website: Official Website

Surendranath Dwivedy (1913–2001) was an Odia politician, journalist and social worker.

== Biography ==
=== Early life ===
He was born in Khandasahi in the undivided district of Cuttack on 11 February 1913.

=== Imprisonment ===
Dwivedy suffered imprisonment for seven years for participating in the Quit India movement and struggle against British imperialism.

=== Political career ===
He was elected to the 2nd, 3rd and 4th Lok Sabha from 1957 to 1970 representing Kendrapara Parliamentary Constituency of Odisha. Earlier, he was a member of Rajya Sabha from 1952 to 1956. He served as a member of Panel of chairman during Third Lok Sabha and Committee on Public Undertakings from 1964 to 1967. He was also one of the Governors of Khoj Parishad, a socio-economic research institute, from 1948 to 1951. Dwivedy was a member of the Indian delegation to the first session of the Asian Socialist Conference, Rangoon, and to the United States of America. Sri Dwivedy entered into the Parliament in 1952 as the member of the Rajya Sabha and continued in the capacity till 1956. In 1957 he was elected to the Lok Sabha where he continued for the successive terms until 1970. Even Pandit Jawaharlal Nehru, the Prime Minister of India, had a great regard for Sri Dwivedy and had deputed him to various foreign countries in the delegation with the parliamentarians. It was because of his vehement opposition and criticism during China (Sino) Indian War-1962 (the border disputes at Ladakh/Arunachal Pradesh as China invaded India), V.K. Krishna Menon (the then-Defense minister) was forced to resign. He was the leader of the Praja Socialist Party in the Parliament from 1962 to 1970. Even after the death of Pt. Nehru he enjoyed the said status and respect as stalwart parliamentarian during the resume of Lal Bahadur Shastri and Mrs Indira Gandhi. His drive against corruption also forced the State Ministry of Odisha headed by Biren Mitra to resign. As a parliamentarian he enjoyed the confidence of all front line leaders like Morarji Desai, Prof. Madhu Dandavate, Nath Pai, Ram Monohr Lohia, Ashok Mehta, Aruna Saif Ali and many others.

His fame as a Parliamentarian was perhaps the prime consideration for which Sri Chandrasekhar, the Prime Minister of India, was obliged to recommend his appointment as the Governor of Arunachal Pradesh in 1991. His speeches in the Parliamentary Debates recorded in the proceedings of both the houses of Parliament bear evident testimony to his repute as a strong Parliamentarian.

He was the leader of the Praja Socialist Party in Lok Sabha.

He was the Governor of Arunachal Pradesh from 1991 to 1993.

== Death ==
He died on 1 October 2001 at Rourkela, Odisha.

== Publications ==
Dwivedy was founder of Krushak, an Odia weekly, and for many years he was its editor. He had many publications both in English and Odia to his credit.

- Away from Dust and Din
- Untold Story of August Revolution
- Quest for Socialism
- Political Corruption in India

Government offices
Preceded by Lokanath Mishra	Governor of Arunachal Pradesh; 26 March 1991 – 4 July 1993	Succeeded by Madhukar Dighe
