= Central Board of Indirect Taxes and Customs =

- Logo of CBIC

- Flag of CBIC
- Abbreviation: CBIC
- Motto: देशसेवार्थ करसंचय (Sanskrit); Tax collection in Service of the Nation

Agency overview
- Formed: 26 January 1944; 82 years ago
- Employees: 19,178 (Gazetted Officers); 53,754 (Non Gazetted Officers)

Jurisdictional structure
- National agency: IN
- Federal agency: IN
- Operations jurisdiction: IN
- Governing body: Government of India
- General nature: Federal law enforcement

Operational structure
- Headquarters: Ministry of Finance, North Block, New Delhi, India
- Elected officer responsible: Nirmala Sitharaman, Finance Minister of India
- Agency executive: Vivek Chaturvedi, IRS, Chairperson
- Parent agency: Department of Revenue

Facilities
- Branches: 91

Website
- cbic.gov.in

The Central Board of Indirect Taxes and Customs (CBIC), is a statutory body under the Department of Revenue, Ministry of Finance, Government of India. It oversees the administration of Indirect Taxes, including Customs duties, Excise duties, and the Goods and Services Tax (GST). CBIC's function also extends to prevention of smuggling, illicit financial activities, and regulation and control of narcotics through its attached/subordinate offices.

The Customs & Central Excise department was established in 1855 during British colonial rule of India to administer customs and collect import duties and land revenue. It is one of the oldest government departments in India.

The CBIC consist of four services - the Indian Revenue Service (Customs & Indirect Tax), the Central Excise Service, the Customs Appraisers Service and the Customs Preventive Service.

== Organizational structure ==
The (CBIC) is headed by a chairperson and consists of six members, representing Customs, Tax Policy and Legal, GST, Central Excise and Service Tax, Administration and Vigilance, IT and Taxpayer Services, and Compliance Management.

== Hierarchy and designation of CBIC ==
The designations and time-scales within the Customs and CGST are as follows after cadre restructure:

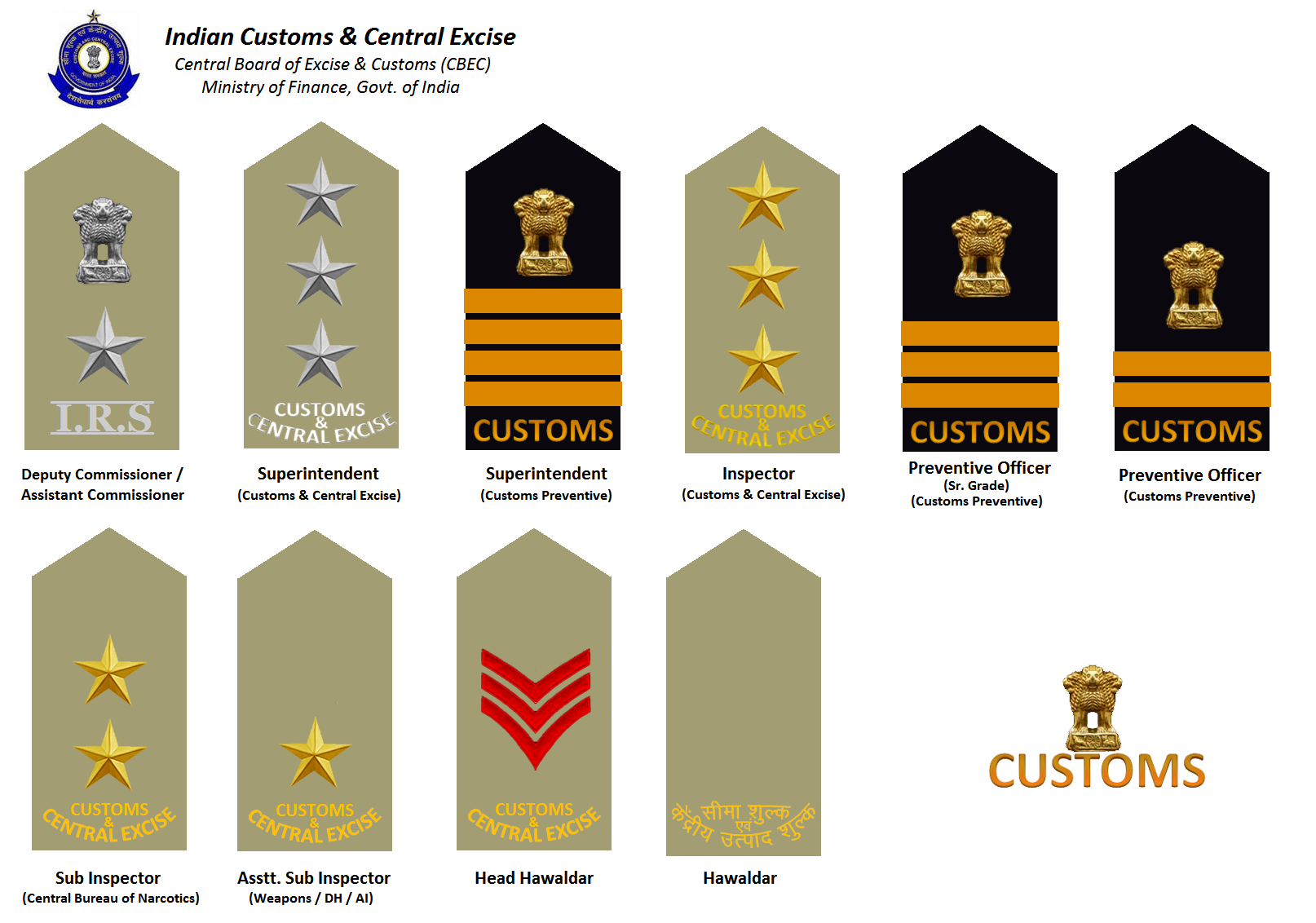
Epaulette of ranks used in Customs and CGST

	Position / Pay grade in the Government of India	Rank in CBIC	Position in Government of India	Level/Rank in Directorates (DRI/DGGI/ED)
1	Group B (Pay level 7)	Examiner of Customs / Inspector of CGST / Preventive Officer of Customs	Assistant Section Officer	Intelligence Officer / Assistant Enforcement Officer
2	Group B (Pay level 8 & 9)	Appraiser of Customs / Superintendent of Customs and CGST	Section Officer	Senior Intelligence Officer / Additional Assistant Director / Enforcement Officer
3	Junior Time Scale (Pay level 10)	Assistant Commissioner of Customs and CGST	Assistant Secretary	Assistant Director
4	Senior Time Scale (Pay level 11)	Deputy Commissioner of Customs and CGST	Under Secretary	Deputy Director
5	Junior Administrative Grade (Pay level 12)	Joint Commissioner of Customs and CGST	Deputy Secretary	Joint Director
6	Selection Grade (Pay level 13)	Additional Commissioner of Customs and CGST	Director	Additional Director / Director
7	Senior Administrative Grade (Pay level 14)	Commissioner of Customs and CGST	Joint Secretary	Additional Director General
8	Higher Administrative Grade (Pay level 15)	Principal Commissioner of Customs and CGST	Additional Secretary	Additional Director General
9	Higher Administrative Grade + (Pay level 16)	Chief Commissioner of Customs and CGST	Additional Secretary	Director General
10	Apex Scale (Pay level 17)	Principal Chief Commissioner of Customs and CGST; Member of CBIC; Director General of Enforcement Directorate; Director General of Directorate of Revenue Intelligence; Director General of Central Economic Intelligence Bureau	Secretary Special Secretary	Principal Director General
11	Administrative Head (Pay level 17)	Chairperson of CBIC	Secretary	

== Duties ==
CBIC administers indirect taxes such as GST, Customs, and the Central Excise and Service Tax laws. The Central Goods and Services Tax/Central Excise Department is responsible for collecting the GST. The Customs Department collects customs duties and is responsible for the prevention of smuggling.

== Uniform and equipment ==
“All Central Excise and Customs Officers of and below the rank of Assistant Commissioner” are required to wear uniform while on duty, subject to exceptions for desk job/special assignments.

Personnel at the Central Board of Indirect Taxes and Customs (CBIC) include both uniformed and non-uniformed officers. The uniform is coloured khaki (CGST) or white (Customs) and incorporates an officer's rank insignia, the Ashoka emblem, and any allowed accessories. From 2026 onwards, officers at international airports wear body cameras during passenger interactions for transparency and accountability, with recordings stored for 90 days or longer for investigations. Officers working purely in ministerial/desk jobs are generally exempt of uniform.

CGST (Central Goods and Services Tax) and Customs officers, especially those involved in anti-smuggling or tax evasion, may carry firearms, but their use is more strictly regulated when compared to the Indian Police Service.

Uniformed Officers (Preventive Duty)
CGST (Indirect Taxes)	Customs
Officers engaged in: Anti-evasion; Search, Seizure & Arrest; Mobile Squads; Enforcement Wings	Officers posted at: Airports; Seaports; Land Customs Stations; DRI, SIIB, Preventive Commissionerates

== Administrative hierarchy & Zones ==
=== Zones ===
The Central Board of Indirect Taxes and Customs (CBIC) is organized into zones of Central Goods and Services Tax (CGST) / Central Excise and Customs / Customs (Preventive) formations across India, headed by Principal Chief Commissioners or Chief Commissioners. The table below depicts the zonal divisions of CGST and Central Excise & Customs.

CGST and Central Excise Zones
Ahmedabad	Bengaluru	Bhopal	Bhubaneswar	Chandigarh	Chennai	Delhi
Hyderabad	Jaipur	Kolkata	Lucknow	Meerut	Mumbai	Nagpur
Panchkula	Pune	Ranchi	Guwahati	Thiruvananthapuram	Vadodara	Visakhapatnam

Customs Zones
Ahmedabad	Bengaluru	Chennai
Delhi	Delhi (Preventive)	Kolkata
Mumbai I, II and III	Patna (Preventive)	Tiruchirappalli (Preventive)

== Notable officers ==
- Sameer Wankhede (IRS Batch 2008, Customs & Central Excise)
- Costao Fernandes (Batch 1979, Preventive Officer - Goa Customs)

== Directorate General/Directorates ==
- Directorate General of Revenue Intelligence
- Directorate General of GST Intelligence
- Directorate General of National Academy of Customs,Indirect Taxes & Narcotics
- Directorate General of Good & Service Tax
- Directorate General of Vigilance
- Directorate General of Analytics and Risk Management
- Directorate General of Anti-Profiteering
- Directorate General of Audit
- Directorate General of Export Promotion

== Associated agencies for officers deputation ==
A CBIC (Central Board of Indirect Taxes and Customs) officer can go on deputation to a wide range of agencies both within India and abroad depending on rank, experience, vigilance clearance, and cadre rules. Within India, these deputations fall into the following categories:

- Directorate of Revenue Intelligence (DRI) (often intra-CBIC but treated like deputation)
- Enforcement Directorate (ED)
- Serious Fraud Investigation Office (SFIO)
- Central Bureau of Narcotics (CBN)
- Financial Intelligence Unit—India (FIU-IND)
- Narcotics Control Bureau (NCB)
- Central Bureau of Investigation (CBI)
- National Investigation Agency (NIA) (limited cases)

== Agencies ==
- Goods and Services Tax Network (GSTN)
- Customs Overseas Intelligence Network (COIN)

== Gallery ==
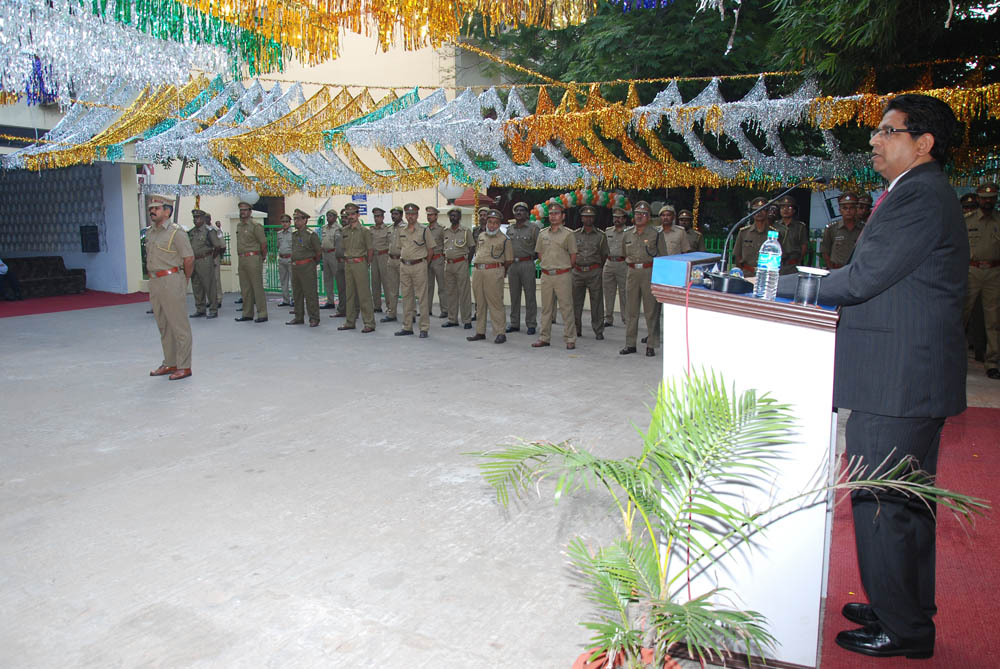
Customs & Central Excise Officer on Republic Day

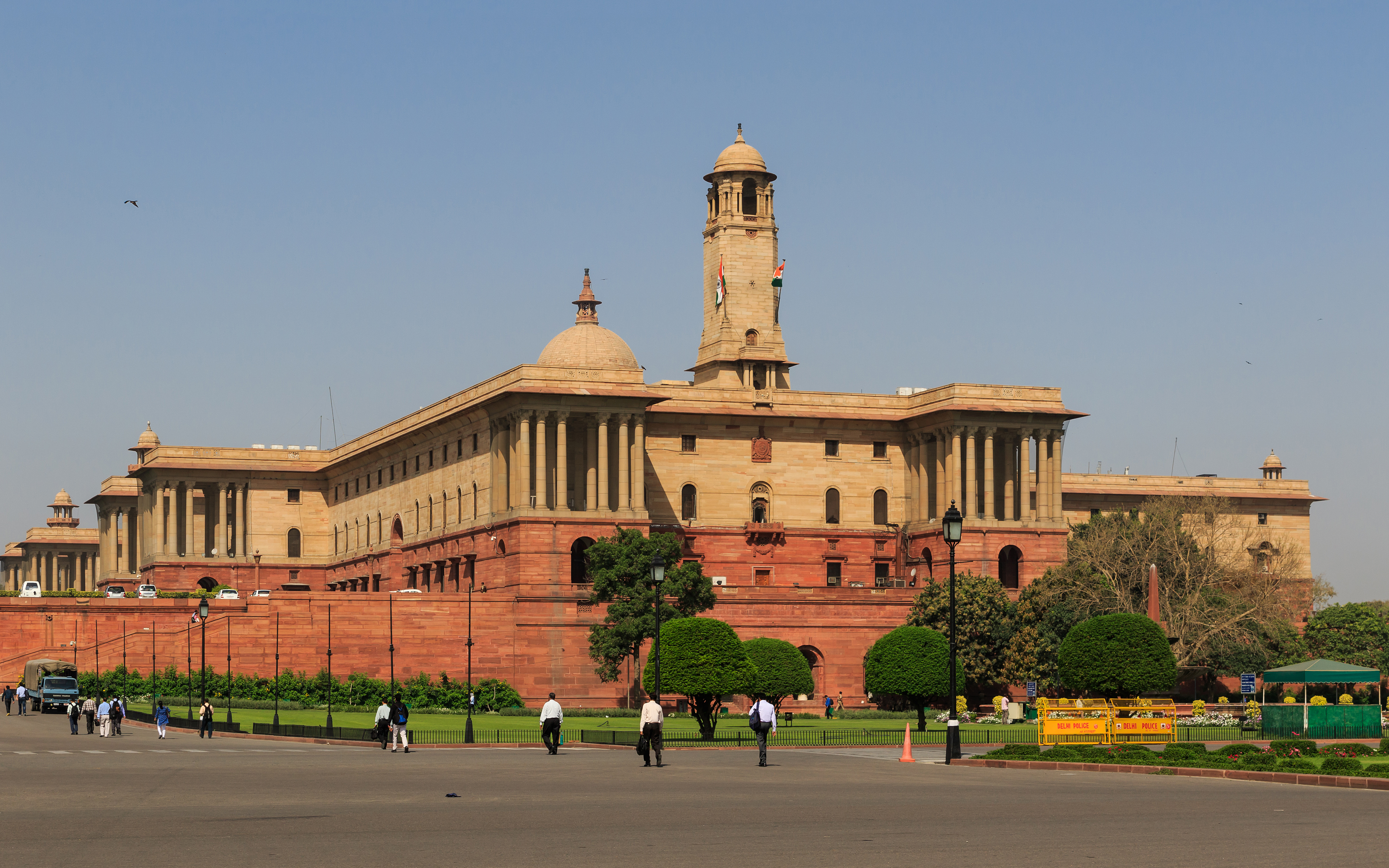
Customs & Central Excise Headquarters in New Delhi

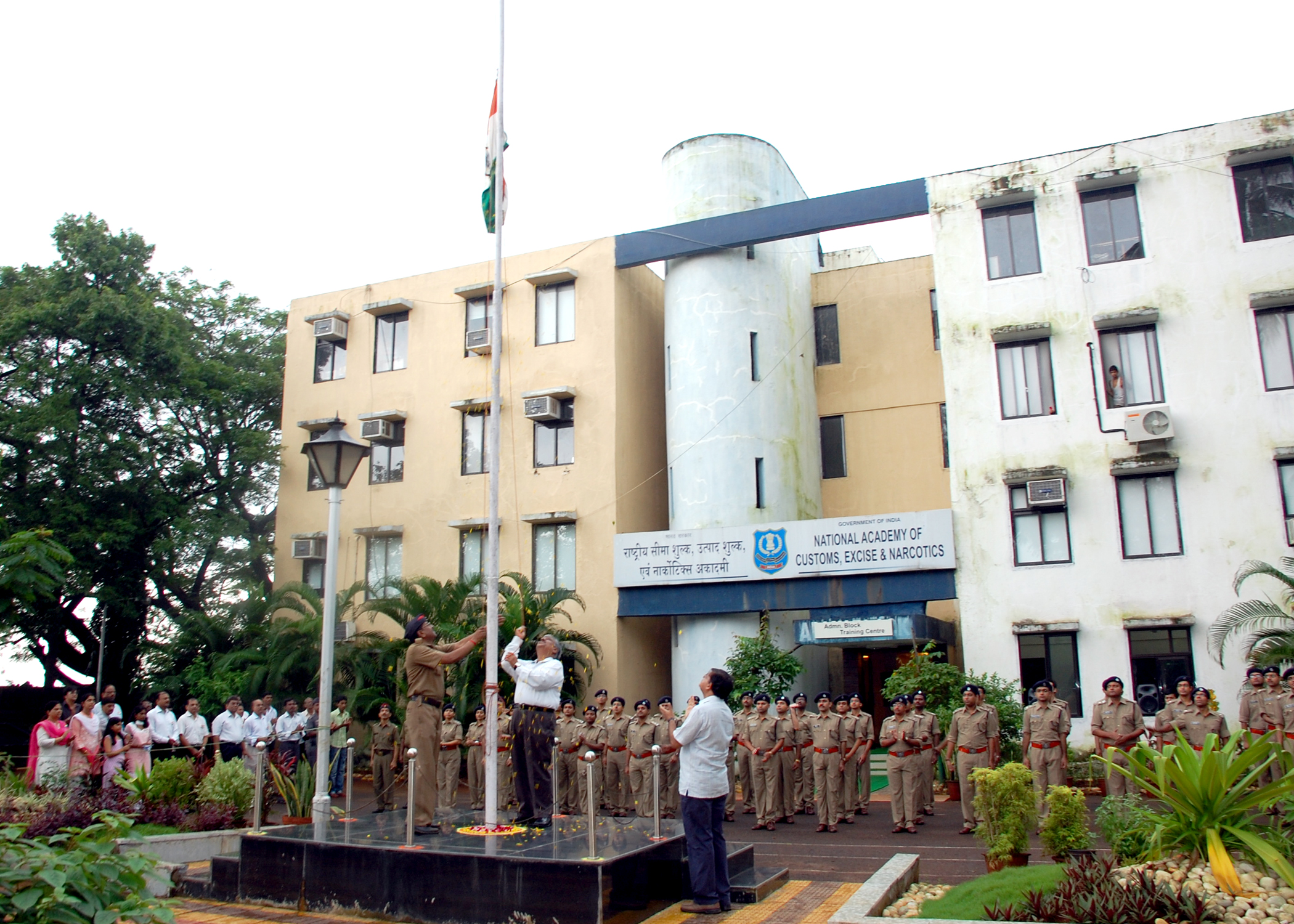
Customs & Central Excise Officers at NACEN

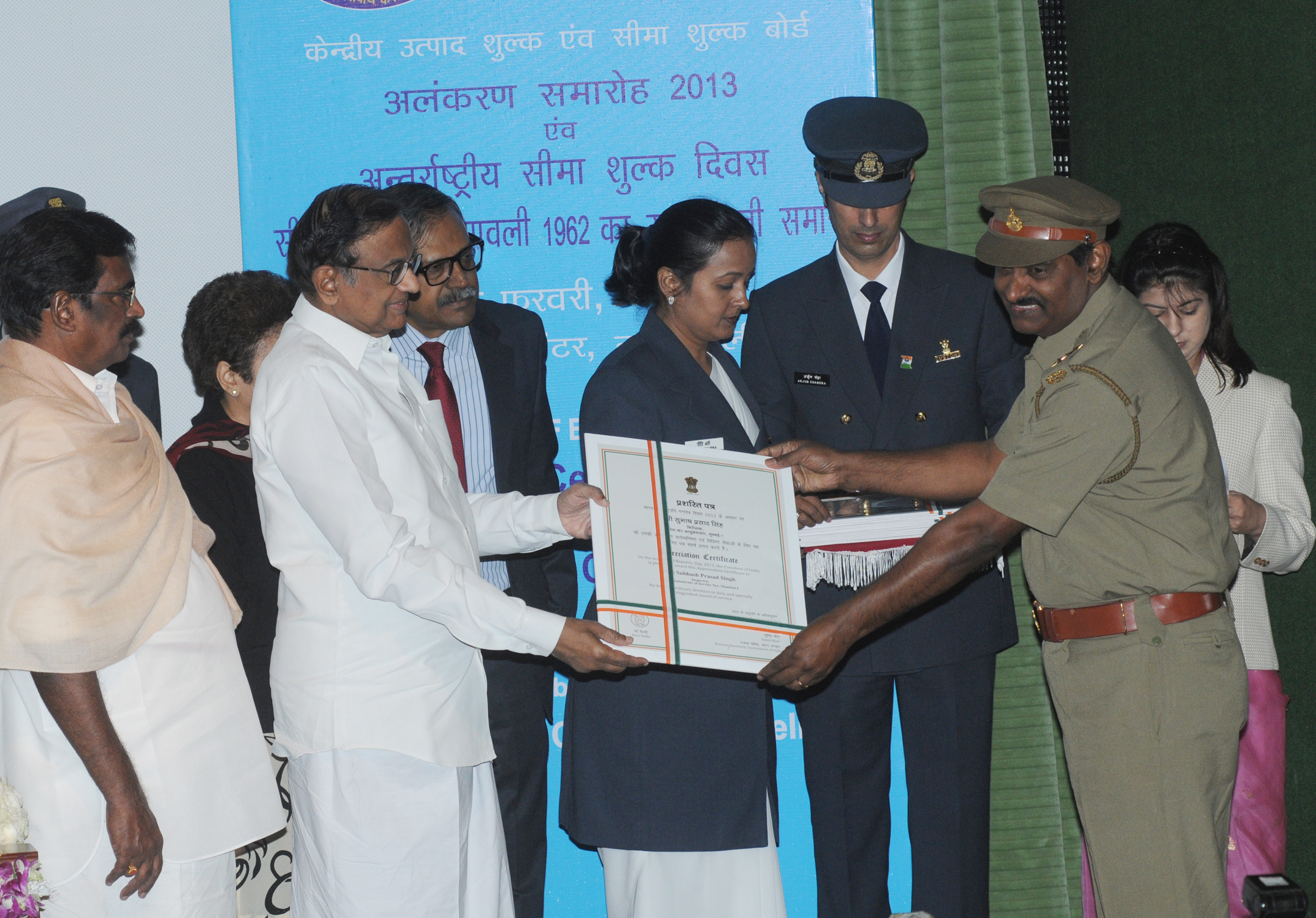
Excise Inspector SP Singh (right) receiving Presidential Certificate of Appreciation (2013).
