= Palasamudram =

Palasamudrum Palasamudrum
- Village
- Palasamudrum
- Interactive map of Palasamudrum
- Location in Andhra Pradesh, India
- Coordinates: 13°16′19″N 79°24′08″E
- Country: India
- State: Andhra Pradesh
- District: Chittoor
- Mandal: Palasamudrum

Languages
  - Official: Telugu
- Time zone: UTC+5:30 (IST)

Palasamudrum is a village in Chittoor district of the Indian state of Andhra Pradesh. It is the mandal headquarters of Palasamudrum mandal.

It is a small village with a population of 1000 + members.

This Mandal contains 13 panchayats

1. Amudala
2. Gangamambapuram
3. Krishnajammapuram(kondam)
4. Simharajapuram
5. Kodandaramapuram
6. Narasimhapuram
7. Palasamudrum
8. Balakrishnapuram
9. S B R Kandriga
10. Tirumalarajupuram
11. Vanadurgapuram
12. Vengalarajukuppam
13. Balakrishnapuram

== Best places to visit ==
This Mandal has a famous six centuries old Shiva temple in Matavalam, Simharajapuram panchayathi. within a distance of 500 mts, you can find a banyan tree with an age of 400 + years.
