= Archana Nayak =

Indian politician

MP, 14th Lok Sabha
- Constituency: Kendrapara

Personal details
- Born: 27 February 1966 (age 60) Bhubaneswar, Orissa, India
- Party: BJD
- Children: Ayaskant Anurag Mishra, Ananya Anurupa
- As of 22 September, 2006

Archana Nayak (born 27 February 1966) is a member of the 14th Lok Sabha of India. She represents the Kendrapara constituency of Orissa as a member of the Biju Janata Dal (BJD) political party. Before 2009 general elections she resigned from BJD and Joined Bharatiya Janata Party (BJP).In the elections she contested from Bhubaneswar Lok Sabha Constituency. She is well known as a firebrand leader of the state.
