= Directorate of Revenue Intelligence =

Premier Intelligence Agency of Indian Customs, Government of India

Directorate of Revenue Intelligence राजस्व आसूचना निदेशालय
- Logo of DRI

- Flag of Directorate of Revenue Intelligence
- Common name: DRI
- Motto: Invisible Presence & Visible Results

Agency overview
- Formed: 1957

Jurisdictional structure
- Federal agency (Operations jurisdiction): India
- Operations jurisdiction: India
- Legal jurisdiction: India
- Governing body: Government of India
- General nature: Federal law enforcement

Operational structure
- Headquarters: New Delhi, Delhi, India
- Agency executive: Ganesh Dutt Lohani, IRS (C&IT), Director General
- Parent agency: Central Board of Indirect Taxes and Customs

Website
- dri.cbic.gov.in

The Directorate of Revenue Intelligence (DRI) is the apex anti-smuggling intelligence, investigations and operations agency in India.

The Directorate is run by officers from the Central Board of Indirect Taxes and Customs (CBIC) who are posted in its various Zonal Units as well as in Indian embassies abroad as part of the Customs Overseas Intelligence Network. It is headed by a Director General of the rank of Special Secretary to the Government of India. The agency works to secure India's national and economic security by preventing the outright smuggling of contraband such as firearms, gold, narcotics, fake Indian currency notes, antiques, wildlife and environmental products. It also works to prevent the proliferation of black money, trade-based money laundering and commercial fraud.

== History ==
The DRI came into existence on 4 December 1957. However the genesis of the DRI may be traced to 1953 with the formation of the Central Revenue Intelligence Board (CRIB) in 1953. CRIB was charged with the responsibility of dealing with all matters connected with anti-smuggling and anti-corruption in the Customs and Central Excise organizations all over India was constituted. It was a small unit consisting of an Assistant Collector and two Superintendents within the Directorate of Inspection (Customs and Central Excise), New Delhi but working directly under the Central Board of Revenue.

The Directorate of Revenue Intelligence was thus constituted on 4 December 1957, for dealing exclusively with the work relating to the collection and study of information on smuggling activities and the deployment of all anti-smuggling resources at the all India level, besides arranging training for the intelligence and investigation officers of the Custom Houses and Central Excise Collectorates deployed on similar work.

So began a chapter in the nation's fight against economic offences. The DRI was at the forefront of curbing smuggling and evasion of duty. The charter of the DRI encompassed all aspects of work pertaining to customs, central excise and narcotics which required control, direction and investigation from the centre. Subsequently, specialized agencies were created to deal with violations of central excise and narcotics and the DRI focused on customs offences. It was an organization staffed and headed by officers of the Customs Department with officers from other services occasionally coming on deputation. Thus, the DRI has always been and is an organization of the Customs department working under the aegis of the Central Board of Excise & Customs (CBEC) as it was known then, and under the Central Board of Indirect Taxes & Customs (CBIC) as it is presently known.

== Legal mandate ==
Though its early days were committed to combating the smuggling in of gold, it now addresses a wide and interconnected gamut of narcotics and economic crimes. DRI enforces provisions of the Customs Act in addition to over 50 other statutes including the NDPS Act, Arms Act, WMD Act etc. DRI is also a part of the Cabinet Secretariat's National Authority Chemical Weapons Convention, the Special Investigation Team on Black Money, the Task Force on Shell Companies, the Multi Agency Center (MAC) on National Security, the Ministry of Home Affairs/NIA's special wings on Left Wing Extremism Financing, as well as various inter-ministerial committees on Terror Financing, Coastal Security, Fake Indian Currency Notes, etc.

The Directorate of Revenue Intelligence (DRI) is responsible for detecting and seizing contraband under its mandate, including gold, counterfeit Indian currency notes, smuggled foreign currency, and narcotic drugs and psychotropic substances. According to the agency, it seized more than 540 kg of heroin and 7,409 kg of ephedrine, along with other narcotics and psychotropic substances, over a five-year period.

== Function ==
DRI is the major intelligence agency which enforces the prohibition of the smuggling of items including drugs, gold, diamonds, electronics, foreign currency, and counterfeit Indian currency. The Directorate of Revenue Intelligence functions under the Central Board of Indirect Taxes and Customs in the Ministry of Finance, Department of Revenue, Government Of India. Headed by Director General (Chief Commissioner Rank) in New Delhi, it is divided into seven zones, each under the charge of an Additional Director General (Commissioner Rank). It is further sub-divided into Regional Units, Sub-Regional Units and Intelligence Cells with a complement of Additional Directors, Joint Directors, Deputy Directors, Assistant Directors, Senior Intelligence Officers and Intelligence Officers.

== Charter ==
- Collection of intelligence about smuggling of contraband goods, narcotics, under-invoicing etc. through sources of India and abroad, including secret sources.
- Analysis and dissemination of such intelligence to the field formations for action.
- Working out of intelligence by the Directorate officers themselves to a successful conclusion, where necessary.
- Keeping watch over important seizures and investigation cases.
- Associating or taking over the investigations which warrant specialised handling by the Directorate.
- Guiding important investigation/prosecution cases.
- Functioning as the liaison authority for exchange or information among ESCAP countries for combating international smuggling and customs frauds in terms of the recommendation of the ESCAP conference.
- Keeping liaison with foreign countries, Indian Missions and Enforcement agencies abroad on anti-smuggling matters.
- To keep liaison with Central Bureau of Investigation and through them with the INTERPOL.
- To coordinate, direct and control anti-smuggling operations on the Indo-Nepal border.
- To refer cases registered under the Customs Act to the Income Tax Department for action under the Income Tax Act.
- To keep statistics of seizures and prices/ rates etc. for watching trends of smuggling and supply required material to the ministry of Finance and other Ministries.
- To study and suggest remedies for loopholes in law and procedures to combat smuggling.

== Reward policy ==
As per CBIC guidelines, DRI grants rewards to informers for information leading to seizure or recovery of Government dues as an ex-gratia payment. As per extant policy, informers and Government servants are eligible for rewards up to 20% of the net sale proceeds of the contraband goods seized (except substances seized under NDPS Act and gold for which separate rates have been notified) and/or amount of duty evaded plus amount of fine and penalty levied/imposed and recovered.

== Hierarchy ==
- Director General (Chief Commissioner)
- Addl. Director General (Commissioner)
- Addl. Director (Addl. Commissioner)
- Joint Director (Joint Commissioner)
- Deputy Director (Deputy Commissioner)
- Asst. Director (Asstt. Commissioner)
- Sr. Intelligence Officer (Superintendent of Customs & Central Excise / Appraising Officers of Customs)
- Intelligence Officer (Inspector/Examiner/Preventive Officers of Customs & Central Excise)
- Class III & Class IV Staff (Ministerial & Constables)
- Officers of DRI are officers from Indian Customs & Central Excise Department on Deputation and Officers from Indian Corporate Law Service

== In fiction ==
Danny Denzongpa plays the Director of Revenue Intelligence Chief in the movie 16 December.

A TV serial on Sony Channel was aired on every Thursday, named Powder, a production of Yashraj Pictures, which was based on DRI.

== See also ==
General

- Indian Revenue Service
- Civil Services of India
- Central Board of Indirect Taxes and Customs
- Directorate General of GST Intelligence

Investigation and prosecution

- Central Bureau of Investigation
- Enforcement Directorate
- Financial Intelligence Unit
- National Investigation Agency
- NIA Most Wanted
- Narcotics Control Bureau
- Indian Intelligence Community
