= Directorate General of GST Intelligence =

Directorate General of Goods and Services Tax Intelligence (DGGI) जीएसटी खुफिया महानिदेशालय
- Patch of DGGI
- Common name: GST Intelligence

Agency overview
- Formed: 1979

Jurisdictional structure
- Federal agency: India
- Operations jurisdiction: India
- Central Board of Indirect Taxes and Customs
- Area: India
- Governing body: Government of India
- General nature: Federal law enforcement

Operational structure
- Headquarters: New Delhi, India
- Agency executive: Shri Rajesh Pandey IRS, Principal Director General
- Parent agency: Central Board of Indirect Taxes and Customs (CBIC)

The Directorate General of Goods and Service Tax Intelligence (DGGI) is a law enforcement agency under the Ministry of Finance responsible for fighting tax evasion in India. It was founded in 1979 as the Directorate General of Anti-Evasion and was later renamed the Directorate General of Central Excise Intelligence. The agency was renamed as Directorate General of GST Intelligence (DGGI) after the introduction of the Goods and Services Tax (GST). The agency is part of the Indian intelligence database NATGRID. The organisation is staffed by officers of Central Board of Indirect Taxes and Customs.

== History ==
Established in 1979 as the Directorate General of Anti-Evasion, its function was under the control of Directorate of Revenue Intelligence, New Delhi. The agency is tasked with collecting, collating, and disseminating intelligence related to evasion of GST. In 1983, it became an independent Directorate and in 1998 the Directorate was upgraded to Directorate General with four zonal units in Chennai, Delhi, Kolkata, and Mumbai.

In 2004 the agency was tasked with detecting cases of Service Tax evasion.

== See also ==
- Taxation in India
- Directorate of Revenue Intelligence
- Central Economic Intelligence Bureau
