= Bhudhaar =

- Location: Andhra Pradesh, India
- Established: 20 November 2018
- Website: http://bhudhaar.ap.gov.in/

Bhudhaar is a e-governance project that is intended to assign an 11 digit unique number to every land parcel in the state of Andhra Pradesh as part of the "land hub in E-Pragati programme". Bhudhaar is the first in India to address issues in land record management. Union Government of India also implementing Unique Land Parcel Identification Number (ULPIN) Project with the reference from this Bhudhaar Project. Bhuseva Authority, an inter-departmental committee was formulated to implement and monitor the progress. Eventually all land related transactions will use Bhudhaar as single source of truth to reduces land related disputes. On 18 February 2019, the Andhra pradesh Assembly gave its consent to the legal usage of the Bhudhaar Number in land documents. This project is being regularly monitored by AP CM Dashboard (CORE Dashboard) which was developed and managed by Real Time Governance Society (RTGS) in real time basis.

== Necessity ==
Land in the state of Andhra Pradesh is generally categorized into agricultural lands, rural properties, and urban properties (like houses, house sites, vacant lands) and forest land. These lands and their records are mainly managed by eight departments in the state. On 13 June 2015 the Revenue Department of the state launched the Mee Bhoomi portal to enable citizens and land owners to view their land records and ownership status at any time. Although people were given land records publicly, it did not solve the integration problem as each department has their own procedural guidelines in providing services to citizens which causes hardship in getting seamless and integrated services.

For instance, a property buyer has to go the corresponding municipality office to enter his name in municipal records as the new property owner. This process takes a long time and causes inefficiency in land governance.

Land related Departments in Andhra Pradesh and their respective functions.
Department	Function
Revenue	Maintaining the agricultural land records and collection of taxes
Panchayat Raj	Maintaining the village lands and properties along with records, tax collections
Municipal Administration	Maintaining the urban lands and properties along with records, tax collections, and land use development plans
Registration	Registration of ownership changes by means of sales, gift, succession
Survey & Settlements	Maintaining the village level and field level maps along with cadastral maps
Forest	Maintaining the forest lands and its records
Endowments	Maintaining the endowment lands and its records
Wakf	Maintaining the wakf lands and its records

== Issuing process ==
To create a single source of truth on land records and to manage land records efficiently, the Bhuseva Authority started the Bhudhaar program and distributed a number to each property. In this project, all land related departments are to integrate their services to the Bhuseva core platform and assign a Bhudhaar number to all properties along with built up properties when successful transactions are completed.

Land records consists two types of data. Textual data (like village name, name of land owner, survey number, extent, owner ID proofs like Aadhaar, voter ID or other related documents) and spatial data (the data depicting the sketch of the land, its measurements (in links/meters/feet), adjacent fields, location on ground). The Bhudhaar number issued in two stages.

== Progress ==
As of 22 February 2019, nearly 53% of temporary Bhudhaar numbers were generated.

Type of Land	Total Land Parcels	Registered Land Parcels	Registered Land Parcels			Bhudhaar Generation					
Type of Land	Total Land Parcels	Registered Land Parcels	Private Land	Government Land	Total	Temporary Bhudhaar			Permanent Bhudhar		Total
Type of Land	Total Land Parcels	Registered Land Parcels	Private Land	Government Land	Total	Number	(%) on Total Land Parcels	(%) on Registered Land Parcels	Number	%	
Revenue	23945966	20146412	17499234	2474999	19974233	19974233	83.41	99.15	0	0	19974233
Municipal	3202115	467353	451425	92	451517	450671	14.07	96.43	0	0	451517
Panchayat	8421140	5231066	5099956	0	5099956	5099956	60.56	97.49	0	0	5099956
Total	35569221	25844831	23050615	2475091	25525706	25524860			0		25525706

== Nationwide Usage ==
Although the present Bhudhaar project has plans to extend nationwide, it was missing scientific approach and harmonization in assigning unique numbers to various regions. To collect taxes and to generate revenue from different properties, each urban or local administration authorities use various assessment numbers. The state of Andhra Pradesh uses the digital door numbering program. To bridge the gap, a nationwide comprehensive system is needed. While preserving the existing assigning process, a brand new Bhudhaar numbering system with a 12 digit alphanumeric pattern can be used.

First two digits—State codes (census code for temporary bhudhaar number, vehicle registration code for permanent bhudhaar number)

Third and fourth digits—District code in the respective states

Fifth and sixth digits—Sub-district code in respective districts.

Seventh and eighth digits—Village/block/ward level code in the respective sub-district/municipality.

Last four digits—random 4 digits containing alphanumeric letters.
