= Director General of the National Investigation Agency =

Head of the National Investigation Agency in India

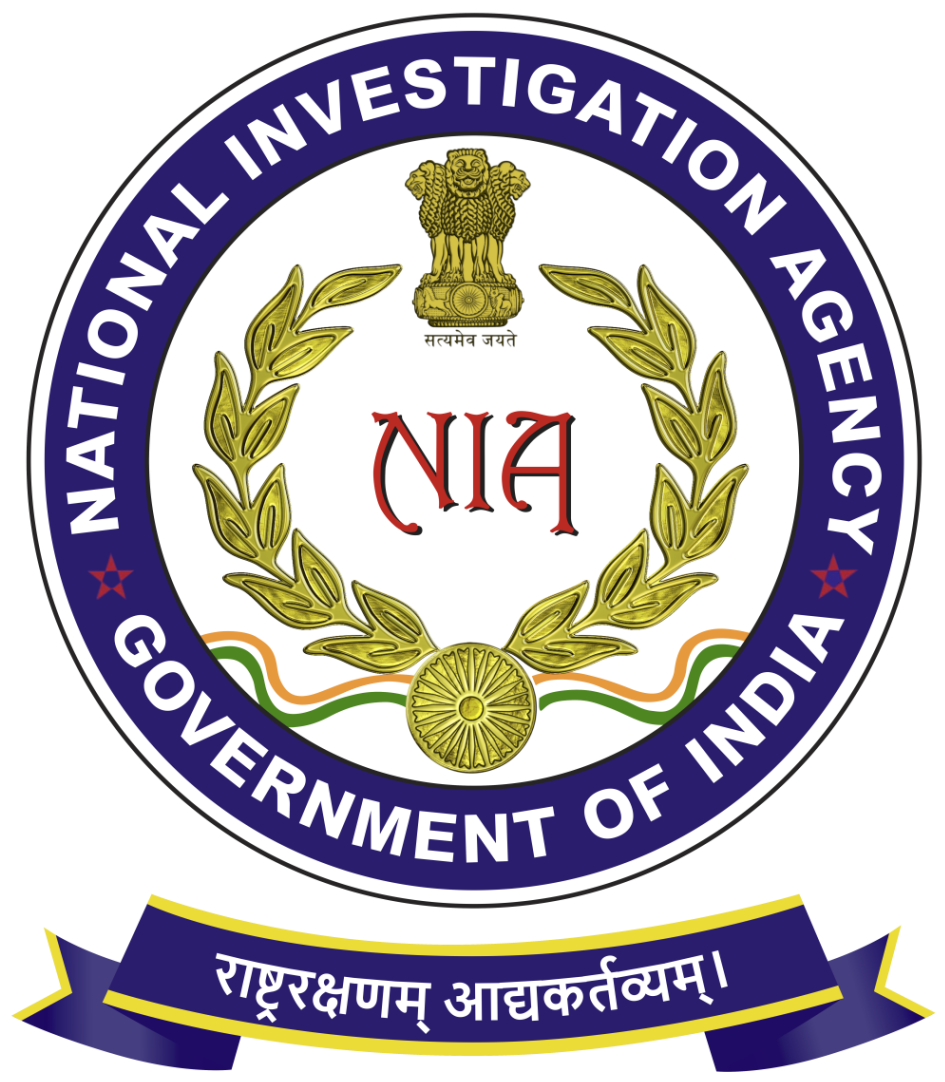
- Seal of the National Investigation Agency
- Incumbent; Rakesh Agrawal, IPS since 15 January 2026
- Ministry of Home Affairs; National Investigation Agency
- Reports to: Minister of Home Affairs
- Seat: CGO Complex, Lodhi Road, New Delhi
- Appointer: The Government of India (with Appointments Committee of the Cabinet approval)
- Term length: At the pleasure of the government until the age of 60; Renewal for up to two years
- Constituting instrument: National Investigation Agency Act, 2008
- Formation: 19 January 2009; 17 years ago
- First holder: Radha Vinod Raju, IPS
- Website: www.nia.gov.in

The Director General of the National Investigation Agency (DG NIA) is the head of the National Investigation Agency (NIA), which is India's principal counterterrorism law enforcement and investigative agency. The NIA was formed after passing National Investigation Agency Act, 2008 during the UPA government, when 26/11 attacks in Mumbai took place. The director falls under the supervision of the Ministry of Home Affairs.

== Background ==
After the Pakistani-based Islamic militant group Lashkar-e-Taiba were conducted a series of terrorist attacks in November 2008 at Mumbai, Prime Minister Manmohan Singh said in an all-party conference declared that legal framework would be strengthened in the battle against terrorism and a federal anti-terrorist intelligence and investigation agency will be set up soon to co-ordinate action against terrorism.

Later laws such as Unlawful Activities (Prevention) Act were amended, and the National Investigation Agency Act, 2008 was passed. The NIA was formed in January 2009.

== Term of office ==
The director general of NIA is appointed by the Union Government, through Appointments Committee of the Cabinet (ACC). The ACC consists of the Prime Minister and the Home Minister of India. The director general can serve at the pleasure of the government but must retire at the age of 60. However, their term can be extended for up to two years. The director general must be a senior Indian Police Service officer in the rank of director general of police (DGP).

== List of the director generals ==
No.	Name of the DG	Term start	Term end	Duration of service	Prime Minister during appointment	Ref.
1.	Radha Vinod Raju	19 January 2009	10 February 2010	1 year, 22 days	Manmohan Singh	
2.	Sharad Chandra Sinha	10 February 2010	25 April 2013	3 years, 74 days	Manmohan Singh	
3.	Sharad Kumar	25 April 2013	30 October 2017	4 years, 188 days	Manmohan Singh	
4.	Yogesh Chander Modi	30 October 2017	31 May 2021	3 years, 213 days	Narendra Modi	
-	Kuldeep Singh (acting)	31 May 2021	23 June 2022	1 year, 23 days	Narendra Modi	
5.	Dinkar Gupta	23 June 2022	31 March 2024	1 year, 282 days	Narendra Modi	
6.	Sadanand Date	1 April 2024	2 January 2026	1 year, 276 days	Narendra Modi	
-	Rakesh Aggarwal (acting)	3 January 2026	14 January 2026	11 days	Narendra Modi	
7.	Rakesh Aggarwal	15 January 2026	Incumbent	235 days	Narendra Modi	

== See also ==
- Secretary of the Research & Analysis Wing
- Director of the Intelligence Bureau
- Director of the Special Protection Group
