= Identification of Prisoners Act, 1920 =

IPC Act 1920

The Identification of Prisoners Act, 1920 was established on 9 September 1920 that defines the legislative points governing the police and prisoners. It was the Act No. 33 of 1920. The act authorized the collection of photographs and measurements of convicts and others. It states that any person who has been convicted of a crime has to submit their photograph and other physical measurements to the police in-charge. Any refusal to comply will be considered a legal offence under Section 186 of the Indian Penal Code, 1860. In 2018, requests to change the Act was placed, which stated that the Act should be modified to include Aadhaar data and biometrics details such as iris scans, signature, and voice sample.
