= Srinivasan Muralidhar =

Former Chief Justice of Orissa High Court

Dr. Srinivasan Muralidhar
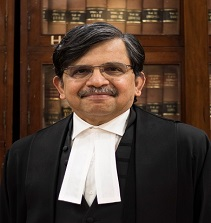

32nd Chief Justice of Orissa High Court
- In office 4 January 2021 – 7 August 2023
- Nominated by: Sharad Arvind Bobde
- Appointed by: Ram Nath Kovind
- Preceded by: Mohammad Rafiq

Judge of Punjab and Haryana High Court
- In office 6 March 2020 – 3 January 2021
- Nominated by: Sharad Arvind Bobde
- Appointed by: Ram Nath Kovind

Judge of Delhi High Court
- In office 29 May 2006 – 5 March 2020
- Nominated by: Yogesh Kumar Sabharwal
- Appointed by: A. P. J. Abdul Kalam

Personal details
- Born: 8 August 1961 (age 65)
- Spouse: Usha Ramanathan
- Education: University of Madras Nagpur University University of Delhi

Srinivasan Muralidhar is an Indian lawyer and former judge who serves as the chair of the Independent International Commission of Inquiry on the Occupied Palestinian Territory. He previously served as the Chief Justice of Orissa High Court and a Judge of the Punjab and Haryana High Court and Delhi High Court. He has been designated as a senior advocate by the Supreme Court of India and is currently practising before the Supreme Court of India.

== Education ==
Srinivasan Muralidhar obtained a first-class Bachelor of Science degree in chemistry from Vivekananda College, University of Madras, in 1981. He secured first rank in the Bachelor of Laws course ("BL") from the University of Madras and was awarded the Lakshminarasa Reddi, the L.C. Miller Medals and the Carmichael and Innes Prize, 1984. As a law student, he was a part of a two-member team of Madras Law College, that won the All India Moot Court Competition and consequently represented India at the 25th Philip C. Jessup International Law Moot Court Competition held at Washington D.C. in April 1984. He completed his LL.M specializing in Constitutional and Administrative Law from Nagpur University in 1990, securing first rank. Dr. S. Muralidhar was awarded a Ph.D. by the University of Delhi in February 2003 for a Doctoral Programme entitled "Legal Aid and the Criminal Justice System in India". He is also a Fellow of the Institute of Company Secretaries of India.

== Early career ==
=== Litigation and advocacy ===
Muralidhar began his law practice in Chennai in September 1984. He qualified as a Company Secretary in December 1985. In July 1987 he shifted his practice to Delhi where he initially worked as a junior lawyer to the then Additional Solicitor General G Ramaswamy, who would later become the Attorney General for India. He was appointed amicus curiae by the Supreme Court in several Public Interest Litigation cases and in cases involving convicts on death row. Muralidhar was counsel for the National Human Rights Commission and the Election Commission of India and a part-time member of the Law Commission from December 2002 till May 2006.

== Judgeship ==
=== Appointment ===
Justice Muralidhar was appointed as a Judge of High Court of Delhi on 29 May 2006. During his almost 14-year stint as a judge of the High Court of Delhi, he pronounced various landmark judgments dealing with a variety of issues. He was later transferred as a judge to the High Court of Punjab and Haryana where he was sworn in on 6 March 2020. As a judge, he had deprecated the use of colonial lexicons ("my lord" and "your lordship") as a form of address in the courtroom and had directed the court's registry to append a note to the daily causelist for his court, requesting lawyers "to try and avoid addressing the judges as My Lord and Your Lordship”.

=== Controversy surrounding transfer ===
The Collegium of the Supreme Court of India headed by then Chief Justice of India S. A. Bobde in its meeting held on 12 February 2020 recommended the transfer of Muralidhar from the High Court of Delhi to the High Court of Punjab and Haryana. The President of India accepted the recommendation of the Collegium of the Supreme Court of India and the transfer was notified on the night of 26 February 2020. His hurried midnight transfer was widely panned by lawyers, former judges, civil society members and the media across the country, and was considered to be a punitive measure by the government for the hearings conducted by the division bench of the High Court of Delhi headed by Muralidhar into the inaction of police during the 2020 Delhi riots. In his parting address before the High Court of Delhi on 5 March 2020, Muralidhar spoke on the transfer giving details of the sequence of events.

=== Elevation as Chief Justice of the Orissa High Court ===
On 15 December 2020, reports suggested that the Collegium of the Supreme Court of India, headed by Chief Justice of India S. A. Bobde, recommended Muralidhar for elevation as the Chief Justice of Orissa High Court. He was appointed as 32nd Chief Justice of Orissa High Court on 31 December 2020 and took oath on 4 January 2021.

=== Tenure as Chief Justice of the Orissa High Court ===
During his tenure as the Chief Justice, the Orissa High Court implemented the Record Room Digitization Centre (RRDC), the Judicial History Project and the Centre for Judicial Archives. The Orissa High Court also introduced several schemes to strengthen the judicial system at the district level, including the resuscitation of the Annual District Judges’ Conference, introduction of the Lawyer of the Year Award and the setting up of Regional Judicial Academies. The High Court also published the various initiatives in its Annual Report, which served as a model for other High Courts.

=== Retirement ===
Muralidhar demitted office as the Chief Justice of Orissa High Court on 7 August 2023. At the farewell organised by the Orissa High Court on his retirement, his colleague-judges, the staff of the High Court, and the lawyers expressed their adulation and admiration, which was widely reported.

==== Gender discrimination and reproductive health ====
Muralidhar authored the judgment in Rajendra Grover v. Air India Ltd. (2007) which dealt with gender discrimination in service conditions of cabin crew, where he held that "this Court also finds nothing arbitrary, unreasonable or irrational in the pre-1997 male cabin crew being asked to serve on a flight which has their female colleague" as an in-Flight supervisor and observed that this has "enabled its female cabin crew to break the 'glass ceiling'."

He also dealt with issue of reproductive health in Laxmi Mandal v. Deen Dayal Harinagar Hospital (2010) which highlighted the deficiencies in the implementation of a cluster of schemes, funded by the Government of India, which were meant to reduce infant and maternal mortality, and the resultant systemic failure that lead to the denial of benefits to two mothers below the poverty line (BPL) during their pregnancy and immediately thereafter. In this judgement he deprecated the practice where "instead of making it easier for poor persons to avail of the benefits, the efforts at present seem to be to insist upon documentation to prove their status as 'poor' and 'disadvantaged'" and that "this onerous burden on them to prove that they are the persons in need of urgent medical assistance constitutes a major barrier to their availing of the services". He opined that "when it comes to the question of public health, no woman, more so a pregnant woman should be denied the facility of treatment at any stage irrespective of her social and economic background. This is the primary function in the public health services. This is where the inalienable right to health which is so inherent to the right to life gets enforced."

==== Housing rights and urban planning ====
In Sudama Singh v. Government of Delhi (2010), which dealt with resettlement of jhuggi (hutments) inhabitants, he was a constituent of the division bench which held that the decision of the government that jhuggi (hutments) inhabitants "are on the 'right of way' and are, therefore, not entitled to relocation" as illegal and unconstitutional. The Court further directed that the "state agencies will ensure that basic civic amenities, consistent with the rights to life and dignity of each of the citizens in the jhuggies, are available at the site of relocation". Similarly, in Ajay Maken & Ors. vs Union Of India (2019), a PIL which dealt with the forced eviction of 5,000 jhuggi (hutments) dwellers in 2015, he authored the judgment on behalf of the division bench which held that "a Court approached by persons complaining against forced eviction" should not view them as "encroachers" and illegal occupants of land, but rather to "require the agencies to first determine if the dwellers are eligible for rehabilitation in terms of the extant law and policy. Forced eviction of jhuggi dwellers, unannounced, in co-ordination with the other agencies, and without compliance with the above steps, would be contrary to the law". It was also held that "the right to housing is a bundle of rights not limited to a bare shelter over one's head. It includes the right to livelihood, right to health, right to education and right to food, including right to clean drinking water, sewerage and transport facilities." The Court further acknowledged that "the right to adequate housing is a right to access several facets that preserve the capability of a person to enjoy the freedom to live in the city. They recognise such persons as rights bearers whose full panoply of constitutional guarantees require recognition, protection and enforcement."

==== Criminal law ====
He also authored the judgement in Kulwinder v. State (NCT of Delhi) (2018), where the court set aside the trial court's verdict and held that the Mirchpur Dalit killing incident of 2010 was "an instance of caste based violence" where there was "deliberate targeting" of setting houses on fire in a "pre-planned and carefully orchestrated manner", and thus a case of murder. In State v. Bharat Singh (2014) which dealt with death penalty and in particular sentencing guidelines, he held that when the state fails to place materials on the aspect of whether the accused is capable of being reformed and rehabilitated before it, the courts can also call for a report from the probation officer, and, thereafter, examine whether the accused is likely to indulge in criminal activity or whether there is any probability of the accused being reformed or rehabilitated. Thus, he opined, that "for the purposes of reference proceedings for confirmation of the death sentence under Section 366 of the CrPC, the criminal court would include the high courts as well". Consequently, the High Court proceeded to direct the appointment of a probation officer with specific guidelines for inquiry.

==== Constitutional law ====
In Naz Foundation v. NCT of Delhi (2009) he was part of the division bench which held that "Section 377 IPC, insofar as it criminalises consensual sexual acts of adults in private, is violative of Articles 21, 14 and 15 of the Constitution". He was also part of the full bench in Secretary General, Supreme Court v. Subhash Chandra Agarwal (2010), where the court ruled in favour of an RTI activist who had sought supply of information concerning declaration of personal assets by the judges of the Supreme Court by holding that such "information does not warrant the protection granted by Section 8(1)(j)" of the Right to Information Act. He authored the judgment in Makemytrip (India) Pvt. Ltd. v. Union of India which dealt with questions involving the powers of tax officials of arrest, investigation and assessment of service tax under the provisions of the Finance Act,1994, where he held that "the decision to arrest a person must not be taken on whimsical grounds; it must be based on 'credible material'." He also held that an officer, whether of the Central Excise department or another agency like the DGCEI, authorised to exercise powers under the Central Excise Act and/or the Finance Act "will have to be conscious of the constitutional limitations on the exercise of such power." He also authored the judgement on behalf of the division bench in Gautam Navlakha v. State (NCT of Delhi) (2018), where the court quashed the transit warrant issued by a Delhi magistrate for the arrest of Gautam Navlakha by Maharashtra Police in relation to the Bhima Koregaon case. There, the court held that "requirement of Article 22 (1), Article 22 (2) of the Constitution and Section 167 read with Section 57 and 41 (1) (ba) of the CrPC" are mandatory.

==== International law ====
During a discussion with Sandra Fredman on her book titled Comparative Human Rights Law, Muralidhar expressed his views on the need for linkage of International Covenants, particularly those ratified by India, in the context of Indian cases and that he endeavored to express these linkages in his judgments. While authoring the judgement on behalf of the division bench in Zulfikar Nasir v. State Of Uttar Pradesh (2018), which dealt with the Hashimpura Massacre of 1987 wherein a court convicted 16 personnel of the PAC and sentenced them to life imprisonment by overturning the trial court verdict, he referred to the "General Comment on the Right to Truth in relation to enforced disappearances" put out by the "United Nations Working Group on Enforced or Involuntary Disappearances" in relation to the "right of the victim to know the truth". Similarly, in State through CBI v. Sajjan Kumar (2018), he authored the judgment on behalf of the division bench which reversed the acquittal of Sajjan Kumar for his role during the 1984 Sikh Massacre. The High Court went on to hold that the such cases were in fact "crimes against humanity" and require a different approach to be adopted by the courts. Further, the court observed that this calls for "strengthening the legal system as neither 'crimes against humanity' nor 'genocide' is part of our domestic law of crime. This loophole needs to be addressed urgently".

=== United Nations Commission of Inquiry ===
In November 2025, Justice Muralidhar was appointed as chair of the International Commission of Inquiry on the Occupied Palestinian Territory, including East Jerusalem, and Israel. In June 2026, the commission concluded that Israel deliberately targeted Palestinian children in the aftermath of the attacks on 7 October 2023. The commission concluded that Israel killed over 20,000 children and injured 44,000 more since October 2023. It also found evidence that Israeli security forces used torture and sexual violence against Palestinian children. The Israeli government in its response, condemned the report and accused the commission of being a "fundamentally flawed mechanism to "single out and vilify Israel".

==== Other notable cases ====
===== Arbitration =====
- Intertoll ICS Cecons O & M Co. Pvt. Ltd. v. National Highways Authority of India (2013)
- M/S. Lanco-Rani (JV) v. NHAI (2016)
- Gulshan Khatri v. Google Inc.(2017)

===== Administrative law =====
- Prakash Atlanta JV v. NHAI (2010)
- CCI v. Grasim Industries (2019)

===== Intellectual property law =====
- Banyan Tree Holding (P) Limited v. A. Murali Krishna Reddy (2009)
- F. Hoffmann-LA Roche Ltd. v. Cipla Ltd. (2009)
- Bayer Corporation v. Union of India (2010)
- Nippon Steel Corporation v. Union of India (2011)

===== Service and labour law =====
- Builders Association of India v. Union of India (2007)
- National Campaign for Dignity and Rights of Sewerage and Allied Workers v. MCD (2008)
- Dev Sharma v. Union of India (2019)
- Shambhu Sharma v. High Court of Delhi (2019)

===== Taxation =====
- CIT v. Kabul Chawla (2015)
- Carlsberg India Pvt. Ltd. v. Union of India (2016)
- CIT v. Janata Party (2016)
- CIT v. Indian National Congress (2016)
- DIT (Exemptions) v. Vishwa Hindu Parishad (2017)
- On Quest Merchandising India Pvt. Ltd. v. GNCTD (2017)

== Personal life ==
Muralidhar is married to Usha Ramanathan, an independent law researcher.

== Publications ==
1. Law, Poverty and Legal Aid: Access to Criminal Justice, a book published by LexisNexis Butterworths in August 2004.
2. The Case of Agra Protective Home. Amita Dhanda & Archana Parasher (eds), Engendering Law: Essays in Honour of Lotika Sarkar, 1999, Eastern Book Company, pp 291–320.
3. Justice to Scavengers. Labour File, Vol 3/6, November–December 2005, pp 25–28.
4. The Right to Water: An Overview of Indian Legal Regime. Eibe Riedel & Peter Rothen (eds), The Human Right to Water, Berliner WissenschaftsVerlag, 2006, pp 65–81.
5. Implementation of Court orders in the Area of Economic, Social and Cultural Rights: An overview of the experience of the Indian Judiciary. Delhi Law Review, Vol XXIV, 2002, pp 113–122.
6. Economic, Social & Cultural Rights: An Indian Response to the Justiciability Debate. Yash Ghai & Jill Cottrell (eds), Economic, Social & Cultural Rights in Practice: The Role of Judges in Implementing Economic, Social and Cultural Rights, Interights, 2004, pp 23–32.
7. Unsettling Truths, Untold tales the Bhopal Gas Disaster Victims 'Twenty years' of Courtroom Struggles for Justice. International Environmental Law Research Centre Working Paper, 2004/5.
8. Judicial Enforcement of Economic and Social Rights:The Indian Scenario. Fons Coomans (ed), Justiciability of Economic and Social Rights: Experiences from Domestic Systems, Intersentia, 2006, pp 237–267.
9. India: The Expectations and Challenges of Judicial Enforcement of Social Rights. Malcolm Langford (ed), Social Rights Jurisprudence: Emerging Trends in International and Comparative Law, Cambridge University Press, 2008, pp 102–124.
10. Public Interest Litigation: Prospects and Problems (with Ashok Desai). BN Kirpal et al. (eds), Supreme But Not Infallible : Essays in Honour of the Supreme Court of India, OUP, 2000, pp 159–192.
11. Trials, Errors and Hope: Indian Experiments with Access to Justice. Journal of National Judicial Academy, Vol 1:2005, pp 350–389.
12. Access to Criminal Justice: Challenges and Prospects. Kamala Sankaran & Uljwal Kumar Singh (eds), Towards Legal Literacy: An Introduction to Law in India, OUP, 2008, pp 45–60.
13. Hang Them Now, Hang Them Not: lndia's Travails with Death Penalty. Journal of the Indian Law Institute, Vol 40, 1998, pp 143–173.
14. Rights of victims in the Indian Criminal Justice system. Journal of the NHRC, Vol. 2, 2003, pp. 88–104.
15. Legal vs. Commercial Liability - Motor lnsurance and the Law. IRDA Journal, Vol. II, No.3, February 2004, pp 22–24.
16. Jurisdictional Issues in Cyberspace. Indian Journal of Law and Technology, Vol 6, 2010, pp 1–42.
17. Crime, Punishment and Justice in India: The Trajectories of Criminal Law. Annual Lecture Series in Criminal Law, 2018, Project 39A, National Law University Delhi.
