= Fayda ID =

Ethiopian national identification system

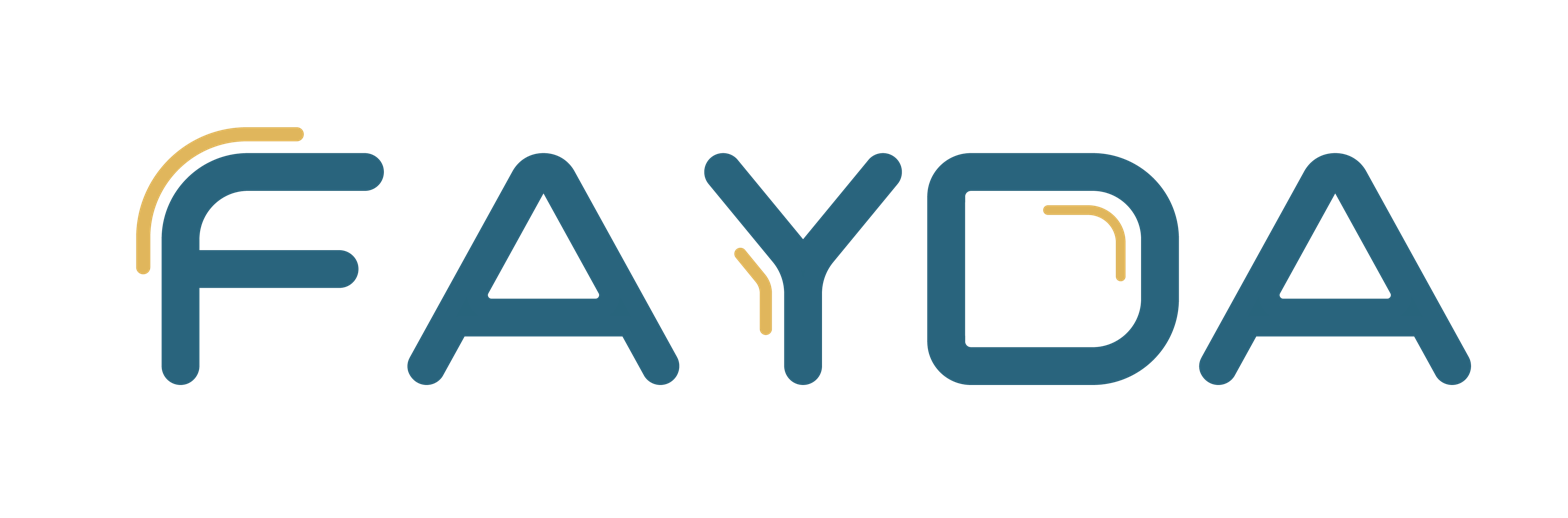
- Country: Ethiopia
- Website: id.gov.et

Fayda ID Card
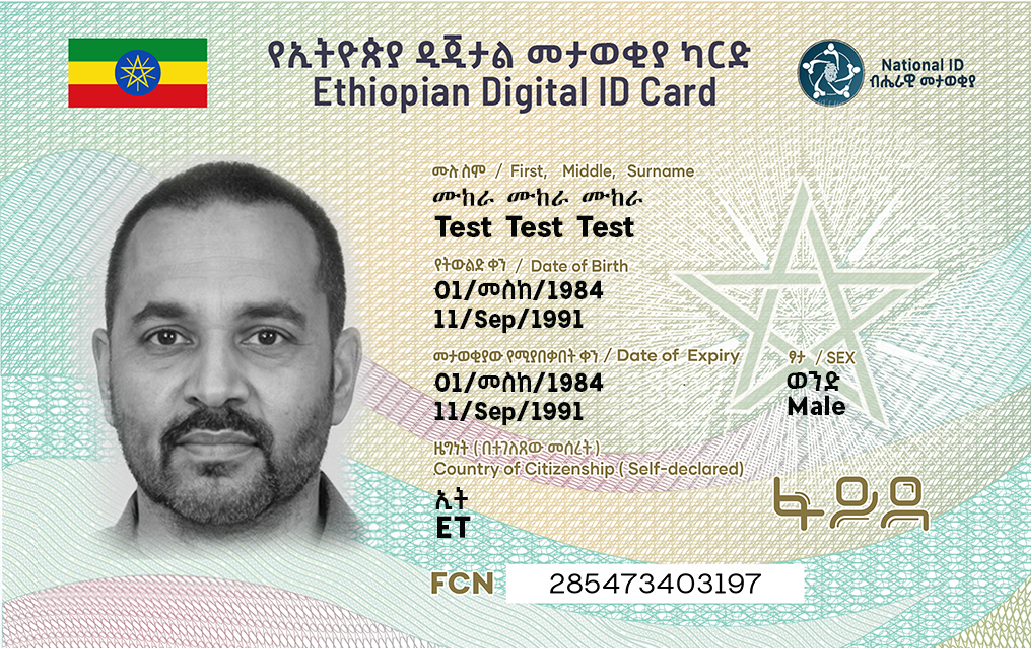
- Type: Identity document
- Purpose: Identification; Bank account
- Valid in: Ethiopia
- Expiration: 8 years
- Cost: Starting from 350 ETB

Fayda (Amharic: ፋይዳ, lit. 'value, importance'; sometimes informally called Fayda ID or Fayda Number) is a 12 digit unique identification number issued by National ID Program (NIDP) of Ethiopia to residents who fulfill the required procedures put in place by NIDP digital identification number. It serves as a unique proof of identity for an individual based on the “one person, one identity” principle due to its biometric identifier technology. it is intended to serve as a national and personal identifier to gain access to different public and private sector services seeking secure eKYC (electronic Know Your Customer).

Fayda ID has its basis on the Ethiopian 10 year development plan, Home Grown Economic Reform, Digital Strategy 2025 a comprehensive digital transformation strategy in Ethiopia. It aims to register all eligible Ethiopians by implementing a nationwide biometric digital ID system.

Fayda ID is an implementation of the open source platform MOSIP.

== History ==
=== Previous identity card programs ===
Prior to the operationalization of Fayda, there was no foundational ID in Ethiopia. The de facto foundational ID is an ID issued by the lowest administrative unit called Kebele. Over 16,400 Kebeles issue this ID after verifying the residence of the person in that Kebele.

However, there is no centralized system to verify the authenticity of Kebele ID and hence, Kebele ID are open for forgery and alterations. A finding from a study conducted by the Ministry of Justice and National Bank of Ethiopia disclosed that within 5 years prior to 2019, banks incurred 1.8 Billion Birr loss as a result of fraud including identity fraud.

=== 2011 - Initiation ===
The concept was initiated under the National Intelligence and Security Service (NISS) in cooperation with the Information Network Security Agency (INSA) and other government bodies.

=== 2018 - Pre-project preparation ===
The Prime Minister’s Office re-initiated the program with the Minister of Peace and the Minister of Innovation and Technology, tasking them with carrying out the operation. /

=== 2019 - 2021 - Technical and legal platform development ===
This process was led by the Ministry of Peace (MOP), in cooperation with the Ministry of Innovation and Technology (MInT) as well as the Prime Minister's Office.

=== 2021 - The National ID Program office established ===
The National ID Program was re-structured under the PM Office in Sept 2021 to ensure a robust, reliable, and forward-looking digital identification platform for residents.

== Legal framework ==
Before the program was constituted under the Office of the Prime Minister, it was housed at the Ministry of Peace. After its re-establishment under the Office of the Prime Minister, the program initiated the drafting and adoption of the Ethiopian Digital Identification Proclamation 1284/2023. This proclamation has personal data protection elements embedded in to it. This proclamation also stresses on the digital identifier aspect of "Fayda" and its inclusive aspects where a registrant can be onboarded even if they lack a proof-of-ID nor proof-of-address through an 'introducer' scheme. The proclamation was approved by the House of Peoples Representatives on 30 March 2023.

== Personal data protection ==
The Ethiopian Digital Identification Proclamation 1284/2023 provides the rules on personal data protection. It recognizes that personal data belongs to the resident. Based on the principle of data minimization, the proclamation prohibits the collection of ethnic origin, blood group, DNA, religious belief, health record and criminal record. Collecting more than the required data is subject to criminal liability.

The proclamation asserts that the data collected for identification shall only be collected after the resident fills out and signs on a consent form. Disclosure of data without the consent of the resident is prohibited. Disclosing any resident data is subject to up to 8 years rigorous imprisonment. NIDP is mandated with ensuring the confidentiality of personal data throughout the cycles of collection, storing, authenticating and processing of personal data. Service providers, termed as Relying Parties under the proclamation shall comply with the principle of purpose limitation. Accordingly, Relying Parties shall refrain from using Fayda ID for the purpose other than the one it is consented for by the data subject.

== See also ==
- Ethiopian Origin ID Card
