= Yogesh Chander Modi =

Indian government executive

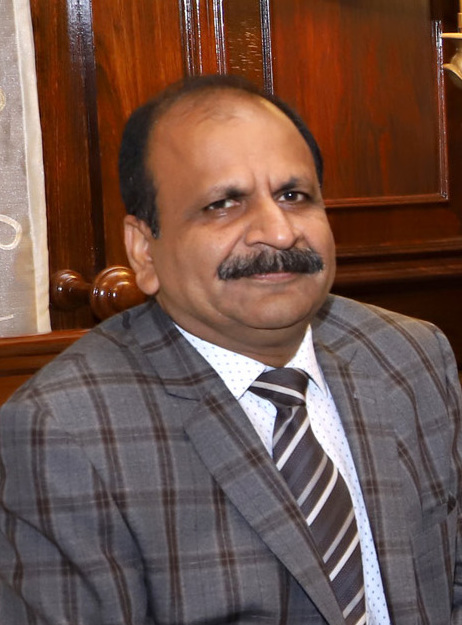
- Modi in 2017
- Born: 8 May 1961 (age 65)
- Other name: Y.C. Modi
- Occupation: Bureaucrat
- Years active: 1984 - 2021
- Employer: Government of India
- Organization: Indian Police Service

Yogesh Chander Modi (born 8 May 1961) is the former Director-General/Chief of the National Investigation Agency (NIA) of India. A retired 1984 batch officer of the Assam-Meghalaya cadre, Y.C. Modi has over 33 years of experience in the Indian Police Service (IPS). He served as Director-General of the NIA from October 30, 2017 and held this position till his superannuation on May 31, 2021. The Director-General is highest ranking agency executive in the NIA appointed by the Central Government of India, and Y.C. Modi is the 4th person to hold this post after Radha Vinod Raju, SC Sinha and Sharad Kumar.

== Career in Indian Police Service ==
Y.C. Modi worked with the Central Bureau of Investigation (CBI) for a period of around 10 years in two stints (2002-2010 and 2015–2017) where he handled Special Crime and Economic Offences besides Anti-Corruption cases. From 1991 to 2002, he worked with Cabinet Secretariat of India and did various postings including one outside India. In the States of Assam and Meghalaya, he was posted as SDPO, Distt S.P., DIG (Range) and Additional Director General of Police (Law & Order). Prior to joining the NIA on promotion, he was working as Additional Director, CBI, New Delhi. Modi had joined the NIA as Officer on Special Duty (OSD) on September 22, 2017, and shortly after was made the Director-General and served their till 31 May 2021.

== Recognition ==
He was awarded with the Police Medal for Meritorious Service in 2001 and the President's Police Medal for Distinguished Service in the year 2008.

== Notable Cases ==
Y.C. Modi was part of a Supreme Court-appointed SIT (Special Investigation Team) that probed Prime Minister Narendra Modi's role in the 2002 Gujarat riots. As part of the SIT, where he was inducted in 2010 and served until July 2012, among the other incidents he probed was the Naroda Patiya massacre. The SIT cleared Narendra Modi, who at that time was Gujarat's Chief Minister.

=== Controversy related to the Haren Pandya Case ===
Another key case he handled in Gujarat during his posting in the CBI during the tenure of Narendra Modi as chief minister of Gujarat was the murder of Haren Pandya, once a political rival to Narendra Modi, in Gandhinagar in 2003. The probe which was headed by Y.C. Modi was slammed by the Gujarat High Court for “ineptitude resulting into injustice” & that "the investigating officers concerned ought to be held accountable for their ineptitude resulting into injustice, huge harassment of many persons concerned and enormous waste of public resources and public time of the courts.". The Pandya investigation led to the conviction of 12 persons under the Prevention of Terrorism Act (POTA). They were all subsequently acquitted (found not guilty) by the Gujarat High Court in 2011, having spent eight years in jail.

The Supreme Court has vindicated the investigation done by the team headed by Y.C. Modi in its judgement on July 5, 2019. A Division Bench comprising Justices Arun Mishra and Vineet Saran overturned the High Court's judgement and observed, "The CBI has investigated the case thoroughly and minutely and the conspiracy between accused persons has been found established. There is voluminous evidence discussed in criminal appeals decided today vide separate judgment with respect to the complicity of the accused persons in the offence. It cannot be said that investigation was unfair, lopsided, botched up or misdirected in any manner whatsoever, as had been observed by the High Court in the judgment which we have set aside...The observations made by the High Court in the judgment which we have set aside were based on lopsided approach without consideration of the entire evidence on record and on the wholly incorrect appreciation of the evidence which was clearly perverse."

== See also ==
- National Investigation Agency
- Research and Analysis Wing
- India Police Service
