= Usha Ramanathan =

Indian activist

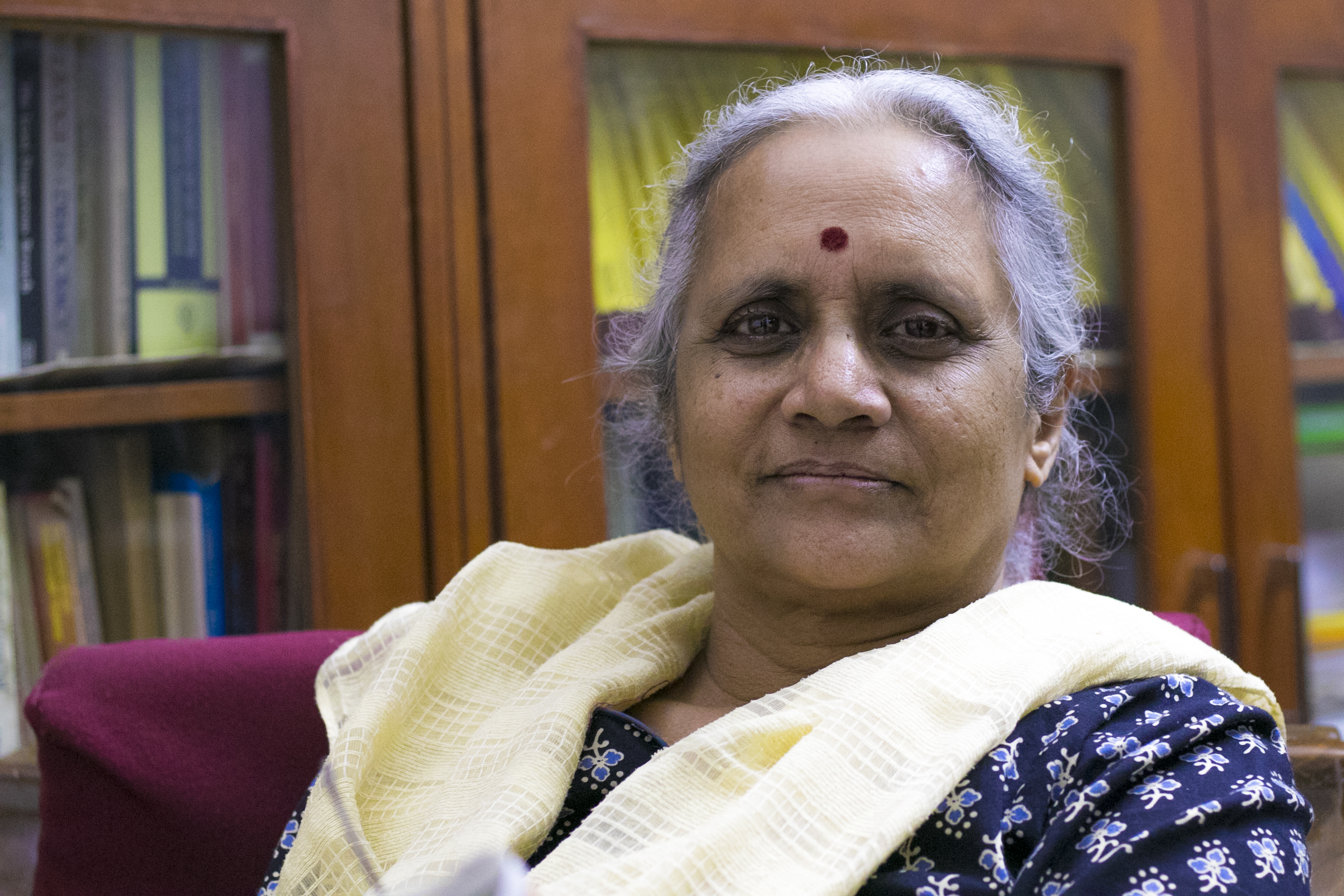
- Usha Ramanathan
- Education: Madras University; University of Nagpur; Delhi University
- Spouse: S. Muralidhar

Usha Ramanathan is an Indian human right activist. She is the South Asia Editor of Law, Environment and Development Journal (LEAD Journal), a peer-reviewed academic journal jointly published by IELRC and SOAS.

== Background and personal life ==
Ramanathan was born in a South Indian family. She is an alumna of Madras University. She studied law at Madras university, the University of Nagpur and Delhi University. She is married to Justice S. Muralidhar, former chief justice of the Orissa High Court.

== Career ==
Ramanathan is research fellow at the Centre for the Study of Developing Societies, teaches environmental law, labour law and consumer law at the Indian Law Institute and is a regular guest professor many universities around the world. Her research interests include human rights, displacement, torts and environment. She has published extensively in India and abroad. In particular, she has devoted her attention to a number of specific issues such as the Bhopal gas disaster, the Narmada valley dams and slum eviction in Delhi. She is a frequent adviser to non-governmental organisations and international organisations. She is for instance a member of Amnesty International's Advisory Panel on Economic, Social and Cultural Rights and has been called upon by the World Health Organization as an expert on mental health on various occasions. Her writings can be found in the Frontline, The Hindu, The Wire and the Indian Express, amongst other leading newspapers.

Access Now organisation gave her the 2018 'Human Rights Hero' award for tireless efforts to highlight the issues related to the UID, commonly known as Aadhaar.
