= National Electoral Roll Purification and Authentication Programme =

Voter registration programme in India

National Electoral Roll Purification and Authentication Programme (NERPAP) is voter registration project of the Election Commission of India. It will link the Elector's Photo Identity Card (EPIC) with the Aadhaar number of the registered voter. It aims to create an error-free voter identification system in India, especially by removing duplications. The project was launched on 3 March 2015.

On 11 August 2015, the Supreme Court of India passed an interim order regarding the Aadhaar project, which caused the NERPAP to be put on hold.

== Overview ==
Under the project, the voters can submit their Aadhar and EPIC number by SMS, email, mobile application and website. 1950 call centers have been set up to accept submissions via phone calls. The voters can also submit their documents at designated registration camps and offices. Voters with multiple entries in the databases can voluntarily disclose it. Voters will be able to apply for corrections in their EPIC entries by submitting supporting documents. The project also aims to improve photograph quality on EPIC entries by borrowing the photographs of voters from the Unique Identification Authority of India (UIDAI) database.

The project expects to weed out duplicate, fake and ineligible voters, and voters who have shifted to other regions from the databases. The projects will also acquire mobile numbers and emails of voters to send them poll related notifications. According to the data provided by UIDAI to the Election Commission, 50,00,00,000 of the country's 85,00,00,000 voters are currently registered with the UIDAI. The UIDAI is expected to complete the registration of all voters in a few months.

== Criticism ==
On 20 May 2015, CPI(M) leader, Sitaram Yechury, wrote to the Chief Election Commissioner of India, Syed Nasim Ahmad Zaidi, expressing concerns about the project. He said the data collected by linking the EPICs with Aadhaars may result in misuse such as discriminating against a section of citizens. He also asked Zaidi to clarify that possession of an Aadhaar was not mandatory for voting and that linking with Aadhaar was voluntary. He said that the SMS sent to voters made it seem like it was mandatory. With the order of the Supreme Court of India collection of Aadhaar number and linking it with the electoral role has been suspended with Delhi first to suspend collection of the data.

== See also ==
- Unique Identification Authority of India
