= Rakesh Aggarwal (police officer) =

Indian Police Service officer

Director General of National Investigation Agency
- Incumbent
- Assumed office 15 January 2026
- Preceded by: Sadanand Date

Personal details
- Born: 5 August 1968 (age 57)
- Education: Mechanical Engineering
- Occupation: IPS
- Police career
- Allegiance: India
- Department: National Investigation Agency
- Service years: 1994 - present
- Rank: Director General

Rakesh Aggarwal is an IPS officer (1994 Batch) of the Himachal Pradesh cadre. He is currently serving as the Director General of National Investigation Agency since 15 January 2026.
