= Sharad Kumar (police officer) =

Indian police officer and civil servant

Chairman, Central Vigilance Commission
- In office 10 June 2019 – 24 April 2020
- Preceded by: K. V. Chowdary
- Succeeded by: Sanjay Kothari

Director General, National Investigation Agency
- In office August 2013 – October 2017
- Preceded by: Sharad Chandra Sinha
- Succeeded by: Yogesh Chander Modi

Personal details
- Born: 28 October 1955 (age 71)
- Education: Bachelor of Science
- Occupation: Ex-IPS officer, Bureaucrat

Sharad Kumar (born 28 October 1955) is a former Indian Police Service (IPS) officer, former Vigilance Commissioner of the Central Vigilance Commission and former Director General (DG) of National Investigation Agency. On superannuation he was employed, in the same post, on contract for period of one year which was renewed for one more year. As on a contract, he is not bound by the All India Service rule norms.

== Background and education ==
Sharad Kumar is a Graduate in Science (BSc). Kumar was born in Bareilly, Uttar Pradesh. Graduation from Bareilly college, Bareilly.

== Career ==
=== As an IPS ===
Kumar joined the Haryana cadre of the Indian Police Service in 1979. His previous post was director general (prisons) in Haryana. Kumar was posted as DSP in Gurgaon, Ambala and Rohtak. He remained the Inspector General of Police, Rohtak range for nearly three years and was promoted to the rank of Additional Director General of Police (ADGP) in November, 2007. Kumar was deployed to the Central Bureau of Investigation from July 1991 to July 1999 as SP and DIG.

He has served as the Director General of National Investigation Agency from August 2013 to October 2017 and subsequently retired from NIA.

=== In the Central Vigilance Commission ===
On 10 June 2018, he was appointed as vigilance commissioner in Central Vigilance Commission for a term of four years or till he attains the age of 65, whichever is earlier.

In June 2019, he has been named interim Central Vigilance Commissioner until a new incumbent is chosen by the selection panel headed by Prime Minister Narendra Modi and where he served till April 2020.

== Awards ==
He has received President's Police Medals for Meritorious and Distinguished services in the year 1996 and 2004 respectively.

== See also ==
- National Investigation Agency
