= Unique Land Parcel Identification Number =

Being described as the Aadhaar for land, Unique Land Parcel Identification Number (ULPIN) is a 14-digits alphanumeric unique ID for each and every land parcel in India. Ultimately ULPIN will be used as single source of truth for land records in near future as it is designed to uniquely identify every surveyed land parcel in india based on the Textual records of rights (RoR) along with its corresponding geo coordinates. This ULPIN project concept was taken from Bhudhaar project in Andhra Pradesh and announced in October 2020 with a plan to assign ULPIN to all land parcels in India by March 2022.

== History ==
In India, Stamps & Registration associated powers are vested with union government of India (Union List) where as land & land related records maintenance powers are vested with respective state governments (state list). This powers distribution Results different types of land records maintenance process in different states. With years of management of land records resulted some states had better land records and some states had poor records and maintenance. Land records management and taxes collection are managed by many departments causing administrative overlap. I.e

- Land & properties related sales and transfers are registered by Registration Department as per the provisions of Registration Act 1908.

- Records of Rights & land registers are maintained by State revenue departments.

- Field maps, Cadastral Maps are prepared and managed by land survey and settlement departments.

- Forest land administered by Forest department.

- Urban property records and correspondening Tax collection records are managed by Municipalities and Municipal Corporations.

These all departments are creating same records as per their specifications and needs by which ultimately creating redundancy. To address the functional overlap with in different departments and different states, the National Informatic Center is conceptualized and implementing the ULPIN project as part of Digital india land records modernization program throughout india in phased manner.

== 12101055000170000 ==
For any given property, the Bhudhaar number will be assigned in two stages i.e Temporary and Permanent. Firstly Temporary Bhudhaar number will be assigned Based on Textual data in records of rights (RoR) and then it will be converted into permanent bhudhaar number only by adding the Geo Coordinates of the corresponding land boundaries.
