= National ID Program =

Ethiopian national digital ID initiative

The National ID Program (NIDP) is the national digital ID initiative with the aim of contributing Fayda ID, a 12 digit unique identification number issued to Ethiopian citizens. It was launched in 2021 and approved by the parliament in March 2023 with Proclamation No.1284/2023. It is headed by the Office of Prime Minister.

== History ==
The National ID Program was launched in 2021 with Proclamation No.1284/2023 adopted by the House of Peoples' Representatives (HoPR) on 30 March 2023.

The aim of national ID is to provide every legal resident and citizen with a unique Fayda identification number, assisted through biometric technology. The program was announced in 2019 to foster national digital transformation in Ethiopia, alluding the Digital Ethiopia 2025 strategy. It is headed by the Office of Prime Minister.

As of 2024, the National ID Program has registered over 9 million residents, with objective of reaching 90 million by 2023. In October 2024, the Program started bidding in Addis Ababa to collect biometric data of one million residents as the national banks tackling the rising financial fraud.
