= Mee-Bhoomi =

Indian governmental land-records portal

- Launched: 13 June 2015; 10 years ago
- Website: https://meebhoomi.ap.gov.in

Meebhoomi (మీ భూమి transl. Your Land) is a land records portal started by the Revenue Department of Andhra Pradesh. It allows visitors to find information on land, including ownership details. The website is in Telugu language. The purpose of Mee-Bhoomi is that the people of Andhra Pradesh can easily see their land records. On this portal, one can view the Adangal, 1-B form records with the survey number, account number, Aadhaar number and the names of the applicants. This portal offers an online link between an Aadhaar number and land records.
