= MOSIP =

Open source electronic identity system founded in India in 2018

Modular Open Source Identity Platform (MOSIP)
- Release: 2018
- Type: Electronic identification
- Website: mosip.io

MOSIP is an open source platform for digital identity management founded in Bangalore in 2018 and used nationally in many countries, especially in Africa. MOSIP stands for Modular Open Source Identity Platform. It builds on the Indian system Aadhaar, and has been called "Aadhaar in a box". It has been praised as expanding access to digital services to people who previously had no way to identify themselves, but has also been criticised for enabling mass surveillance and for its strong reliance on extensive biometric data.

== Background and functionality ==
MOSIP is based on Aadhaar, a system that was developed in India in 2009 as a way for people who might lack papers or other forms of identification to establish a consistent ID using biometric data. Both MOSIP and Aadhaar are set up to use extensive biometric data, including fingerprints of all ten fingers, iris scans of both eyes and a photograph of the face for everybody over the age of five.

MOSIP is part of the "developmental turn in digital identity", and its development was co-funded by donors such as the Norwegian government the Sir Ratan Tata Trust, the Omidyar Network, and the Gates Foundation, although the Gates Foundation plans to wind down support as they argue that such models should be self-sustaining.

MOSIP can be customised by countries according to their own policies, and has been or is being implemented in countries including Nigeria, Ethiopia, Morocco, the Philippines, and Sri Lanka. It has been endorsed by the World Bank's ID4D program. MOSIP allows data to be exchanged between different identity systems, which "limits dependence on a single service provider", which has been seen as a challenge to European companies that are trying to sell their proprietary systems to African countries. MOSIP representatives say that the modular system means a country can, for example, choose to implement it without biometrics.

== Criticism ==
While there is little discussion of MOSIP in Western media, a number of critical scholarly articles have been published. The systems can be viewed as a vehicle for data colonialism, and can exclude people from services, although with improved privacy legislation this could be improved. In an article published in the Journal of Contemporary African Studies, Mallika Dharmaraj argues that "if we understand Aadhaar as a technology that abets contemporary Hindu nationalism in India, its exportation to countries in East Africa eerily resembles patterns of the past." Aaron Martin argued in a paper in Surveillance & Society that more consideration needs to be given to "India’s role in exporting a vision, organizing principles, and technologies" through MOSIP, especially since many of the countries implementing the system do not yet have data protection laws.
