= National Investigation Agency =

Federal investigation agency in India

- Seal of National Investigation Agency

- Flag of National Investigation Agency
- Motto: rāṣṭrarakṣaṇam ādyakartavyam Nation’s Protection is the First Duty

Agency overview
- Formed: 20 January 2009; 17 years ago
- Employees: 1,360
- Annual budget: ₹420 crore (US$45 million) (2026–27)

Jurisdictional structure
- Federal agency: India
- Operations jurisdiction: India
- Governing body: Ministry of Home Affairs, Government of India
- Constituting instrument: National Investigation Agency Act, 2008
- General nature: Federal law enforcement

Operational structure
- Headquarters: CGO Complex, New Delhi, Delhi, India
- 28.5884°N 77.2329°E
- Elected officer responsible: Amit Shah, Minister of Home Affairs
- Agency executive: Rakesh Aggarwal, IPS, Director General

Website
- www.nia.gov.in

The National Investigation Agency (NIA) is the principal counterterrorism law enforcement and investigative agency of India. It is under the Ministry of Home Affairs. Responsible for investigating and prosecuting offences affecting the sovereignty, security, and integrity of the country. It was established under the National Investigation Agency Act, 2008, enacted in the aftermath of the 2008 Mumbai terrorist attacks. The NIA has nationwide jurisdiction to investigate offences listed in the Act's Schedule, including terrorism, terrorist financing, attacks on India's security, and other specified crimes.

The agency is empowered to take over investigations from state police forces with the approval of the central government and, under certain provisions of the Act, may also investigate offences committed outside India that affect Indian citizens or national interests. Headquartered in New Delhi, the NIA maintains branch offices across the country and coordinates with domestic and international law enforcement and intelligence agencies.

Headquartered in New Delhi, the NIA has branches across all major cities.

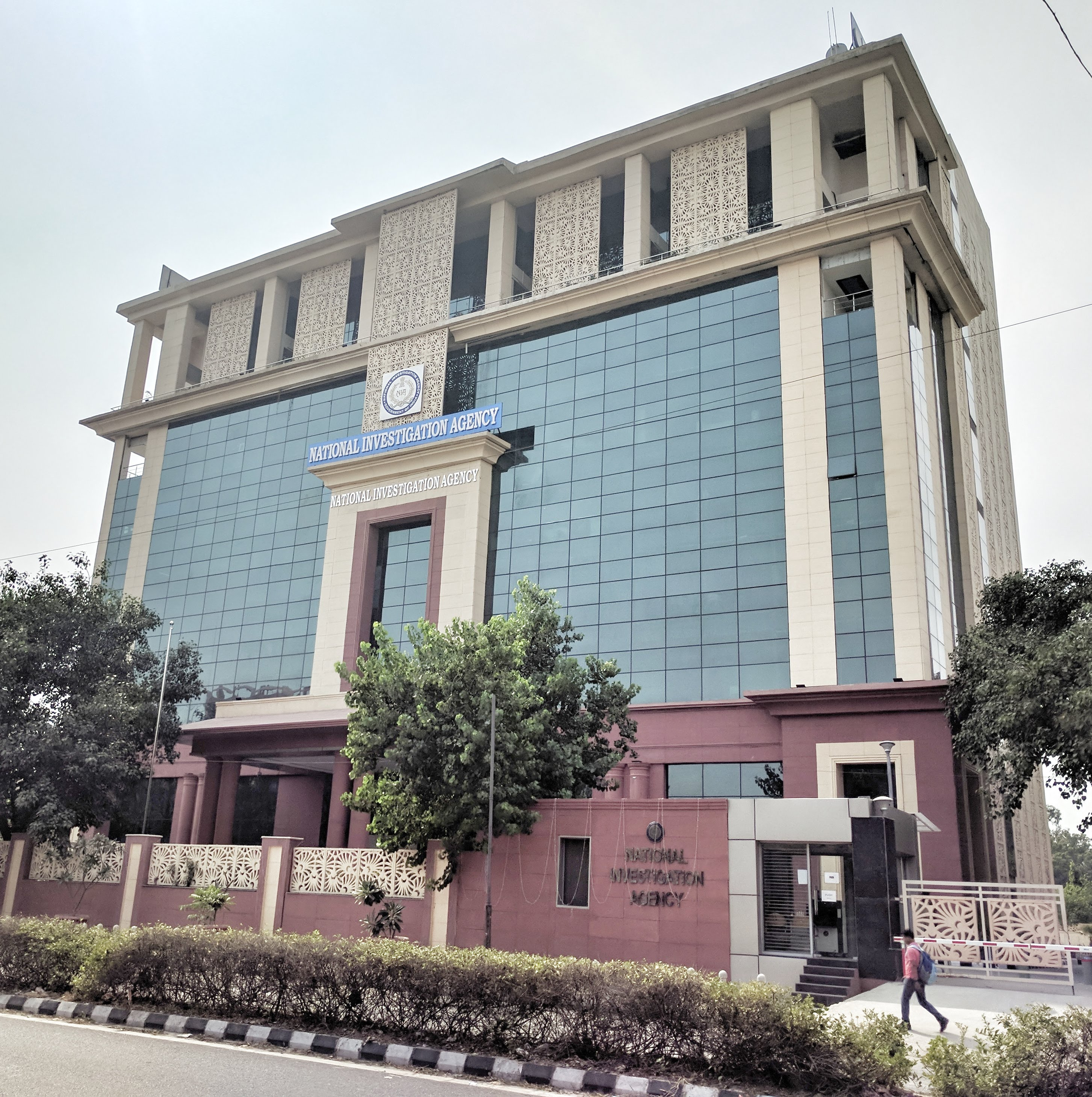
NIA headquarters in New Delhi

== History ==
The National Investigation Agency (NIA) was established under the National Investigation Agency Act, 2008, following the 2008 Mumbai terrorist attacks, which highlighted the need for a dedicated central agency to investigate terrorism-related offences. The Act received presidential assent on 31 December 2008, and the NIA was formally constituted on the 20 January 2009 as India's first statutory counterterrorism investigative agency with nationwide jurisdiction.

The agency was created to strengthen the country's response to terrorism and other offences affecting national security. Before the NIA's establishment, such investigations were primarily conducted by state police forces, often with assistance from central agencies. The NIA was given the authority to take over investigations into offences listed in the Schedule of the Act, allowing it to conduct investigations across state boundaries under the direction of the central government.

During its early years, the NIA investigated cases involving terrorist attacks, bomb blasts, terror financing, and the activities of banned organisations. As the nature of national security threats evolved, Parliament expanded the agency's powers through the National Investigation Agency (Amendment) Act, 2019. The amendment added several new scheduled offences, including human trafficking, cyberterrorism, offences relating to prohibited arms, counterfeit currency, and explosive substances. It also empowered the agency to investigate specified offences committed outside India when they affected Indian citizens or the country's interests.

Since its inception, the NIA has handled several major terrorism and national security investigations across India. It has gradually expanded its presence by establishing branch offices in different parts of the country and continues to work closely with state police forces, intelligence agencies, and international law enforcement organisations in the investigation and prosecution of scheduled offences.

=== NIA (Amendment) Act, 2019 ===
The NIA (Amendment) Bill 2019 was passed by the parliament on 17 July 2019. The Bill aims to give more teeth to the investigating powers of the NIA. It empowers the NIA to probe terror attacks targeting Indians and Indian interests abroad. The amended legislation, which aims to primarily empower the anti-terror agency to investigate scheduled offences such as human trafficking; circulation of fake currency; manufacture and sale of prohibited arms; and cyber-terrorism, was passed with a majority of 278 votes in favour and six against in the Lok Sabha. It was also passed in the Rajya Sabha after those opposed to it staged a walkout. This amendment will now also allow NIA to investigate the Sri Lanka Easter Bombings and Kabul Gurudwara bombing.

== Mission, Priorities and budget ==
=== Mission ===
The mission of the National Investigation Agency (NIA) is to investigate and prosecute offences affecting the sovereignty, security, and integrity of India. As the country's principal counterterrorism investigative agency, it seeks to prevent and combat terrorism, disrupt terror financing and related criminal networks, and strengthen the national security framework through professional investigation and effective prosecution.

=== Functions ===
Under the National Investigation Agency Act, 2008, the NIA is responsible for:

- Investigating and prosecuting offences specified in the Schedule to the Act.
- Conducting investigations into terrorism, terrorist financing, and other offences affecting national security.
- Assisting and coordinating with state police forces and other central law enforcement agencies.
- Collecting, analysing, and sharing intelligence related to scheduled offences with relevant authorities.
- Investigating specified offences committed outside India that affect Indian citizens or the interests of the country, in accordance with applicable laws and international agreements.

=== Priorities ===
The NIA's principal priorities include:

- Preventing and investigating terrorist activities.
- Countering terrorist financing and support networks.
- Investigating offences involving organised terror groups and extremist organisations.
- Combating cyberterrorism and other scheduled cyber-related offences.
- Investigating offences relating to prohibited arms, explosives, and counterfeit currency.
- Strengthening coordination with domestic and international law enforcement agencies.
- Improving investigation standards and securing effective prosecution of scheduled offences.

=== Budget ===
The NIA's annual budget is allocated by the Government of India through the Union Budget under the Ministry of Home Affairs. Funding supports personnel, investigations, forensic and technical capabilities, infrastructure, training, and administrative expenditure. The agency's budget varies from year to year based on allocations approved by Parliament. For the year 2026–27, it was ₹420 crore (US$45 million)

== Organisation ==
The National Investigation Agency (NIA) is headed by a Director General (DG), an officer of the Indian Police Service (IPS) holding the rank of Director General of Police. The agency is headquartered in New Delhi and functions under the administrative control of the Ministry of Home Affairs.

The Director General is supported by Special Directors General (Special DGs), Additional Directors General (ADGs), Inspectors General (IGs), Deputy Inspectors General (DIGs), Superintendents of Police (SPs), Additional Superintendents of Police (Addl. SPs), Deputy Superintendents of Police (DSPs), and other officers. To facilitate investigations across the country, the NIA maintains branch offices in several states and union territories, enabling nationwide coordination in counterterrorism and other national security-related cases.

Senior officers are primarily drawn on deputation from the Indian Police Service (IPS), the Indian Revenue Service (IRS), the Central Armed Police Forces (CAPFs), and State Police Services (SPS). Subordinate personnel are recruited either through the Staff Selection Commission (SSC) or on deputation from the CAPFs and state.

=== Rank structure ===
Insignia	Hierarchy in NIA	Equivalent rank in state police	Grade/level on pay matrix	Basic Pay
	Director General of the NIA	Director General of Police	Apex Scale (Pay level 17)	₹225,000 (US$2,400)
	Special Director General	Special Director General of Police	HAG+ Scale (Pay level 16)	₹205,400 (US$2,200)—₹224,400 (US$2,400)
	Additional Director General (ADG)	Additional Director General of Police	HAG Scale (Pay level 15)	₹182,200 (US$1,900)—₹224,100 (US$2,400)
	Inspector General (IG)	Inspector General of Police	SAG scale (Pay level 14)	₹144,200 (US$1,500)—₹218,200 (US$2,300)
	Deputy Inspector General (DIG)	Deputy inspector general of police	Selection grade (Pay level 13A)	₹131,100 (US$1,400)—₹216,600 (US$2,300)
	Superintendent	Senior Superintendent of Police	Selection Grade (Pay level 13)	₹123,100 (US$1,300)—₹215,900 (US$2,300)
	Superintendent	Superintendent of Police	Junior Administrative Grade (Pay level 12)	₹78,800 (US$840)—₹209,200 (US$2,200)
	Additional Superintendent	Addl Superintendent of Police	Senior time scale (Pay level 11)	₹67,700 (US$720)—₹208,700 (US$2,200)
	Deputy Superintendent	Deputy Superintendent of Police	Junior time scale (Pay level 10)	₹56,100 (US$600)—₹132,000 (US$1,400)
	Inspector	Inspector of Police	Group 'B' Non-gazetted (Pay level 7)	₹44,900 (US$480)—₹142,400 (US$1,500)
	Sub-inspector	Sub-inspector of police	Group 'B' Non-gazetted (Pay level 6)	₹35,400 (US$380)—₹112,400 (US$1,200)
	Assistant sub-inspector	Assistant sub-inspector of police	Group 'C' Non-gazetted (Pay level 5)	₹29,200 (US$310)—₹92,300 (US$990)
	Head constable	Head constable	Group 'C' Non-gazetted (Pay level 4)	₹25,500 (US$270)—₹81,100 (US$870)
	Constable	Constable	Group 'C' Non-gazetted (Pay level 3)	₹21,700 (US$230)—₹69,100 (US$740)

=== Special NIA Courts ===
Various Special Courts have been established by the Central Government of India for the trial of the cases registered at various police stations of NIA under Sections 11 and 22 of the NIA Act 2008. Any question as to the jurisdiction of these courts is decided by the Central Government. These are presided over by a judge appointed by the Central Government on the recommendation of the Chief Justice of the High Court with jurisdiction in that region. The Supreme Court of India has also been empowered to transfer the cases from one special court to any other special court within or outside the state if in the interest of justice, in light of the prevailing circumstances in any particular state. The NIA Special Courts are empowered with all powers of the court of sessions under Code of Criminal Procedure, 1973 for the trial of any offence.

Trials by these courts are held on a day-to-day basis on all working days and have precedence over the trial of any other case against the accused in any other court (not being a Special Court) and have to be concluded in preference to the trial of such other case. An appeal from any judgment, sentence, or order, not being an interlocutory order, of a Special Court lies to the High Court both on facts and on law. Such an appeal can be heard by a division bench of two Judges of the High Court. At present, there are 38 Special NIA Courts. State Governments have also been empowered to appoint one or more such special courts in their states.

== Jurisdiction ==
The National Investigation Agency (NIA) exercises jurisdiction over offences specified in the Schedule to the National Investigation Agency Act, 2008, commonly referred to as scheduled offences. These include terrorism-related offences, terrorist financing, offences involving explosive substances, unlawful activities under the Unlawful Activities (Prevention) Act, 1967, and other offences notified under the Act.

The Central Government may direct the NIA to investigate any scheduled offence if it is satisfied that the case has national or international implications. Once the agency takes over an investigation, it assumes the powers, duties, and privileges of a police force throughout India, irrespective of state boundaries. State governments are required to forward reports of scheduled offences to the Central Government, which determines whether the investigation should be entrusted to the NIA.

The National Investigation Agency (Amendment) Act, 2019 expanded the agency's jurisdiction by empowering it to investigate specified offences committed outside India if they affect Indian citizens or the interests of the country. Such investigations are conducted in accordance with applicable Indian law, international treaties, and the laws of the country where the offence occurred.

The NIA has the authority to investigate and prosecute offences across all states and union territories of India and may coordinate with state police forces, other central agencies, and international law enforcement organisations during the course of its investigations.

== Success of NIA ==
=== Individual terrorists ===
In 2012, NIA with the assistance of Interpol and Saudi Intelligence agencies, successfully arrested terrorists namely: Abu Jundal alias Abu Hamza (Indian national), Fasih Mohammad and Yaseen Bhatkal (Indian Mujahideen).

In 2013, NIA was successful in arresting two senior members of Indian Mujahideen, namely Ahmed Siddibappa Zaraar alias Yasin Bhatkal and Asadullah Akhtar alias Haddi, at the Indo—Nepal border in Bihar on 29 August 2013. These two were instrumental in the commission of several terrorist attacks across the country for the past several years, under the banner of Indian Mujahideen, a proscribed terrorist organisation.

On 8 April 2025, a team of NIA agents took custody of Tahawwur Rana from the United States Marshals Service, a co-conspirator of the November 2008 terror attacks in Mumbai, after his plea to stop extradition was rejected by the Supreme Court of the United States. The plane carrying Rana reached the Palam Air base in New Delhi on 10 April 2025. He was immediately sent to an 18-day NIA custody by a special NIA court in Delhi, and is currently being interrogated for his involvement in the attack as well as face trial for the attack.

=== Terrorist organisations ===
==== Jammu and Kashmir war on terror ====
NIA has been active in the war against terror in Jammu and Kashmir. On 18 January 2019, NIA filed a chargesheet against 12 people including Lashkar-e-Taiba terror group chief Hafiz Saeed and Hizbul Mujahideen chief Syed Salahuddin. This chargesheet was filed after nearly eight months of investigations spanning six states in India during which over 300 witnesses were examined, 950 "incriminating documents" and 600 electronic devices were seized. NIA has also stated that the war against terror in Kashmir is not about terror funding alone, it's about a conspiracy to wage war against India. During the investigation the NIA has arrested people allegedly involved in stone-pelting incidents for the first time including Kashmiri photojournalist Kamran Yusuf.

=== Naxals ===
It has identified two Naxalite commanders in Bastar who were part of the ambush that killed almost the entire Congress's Chhattisgarh top brass.

=== Foreign militant groups behind Manipur violence ===
On 30 September 2023, in a joint operation with Manipur Police, NIA arrested a 51-year-old man, Seiminlun Gangte, from Churachandpur, Manipur for 'transnational conspiracy by terror outfits in Myanmar and Bangladesh to wage war against the government of India by exploiting the ethnic unrest in Manipur'. NIA announced that the mentioned militant outfits have been providing funds to procure arms, ammunition and other types of terrorist hardware, which are being sourced both from across the border, as well as from other terrorist outfits active in northeastern states of India.

On 17th March 2026, in Kolkata, the NIA arrested Matthew Aaron Van Dyke, an American mercenary and spy, as an accused in a case involving an alleged conspiracy to carry out terrorist activities linked to drone operations during the Insurgency in Northeast India. According to documents submitted by the NIA before a court in Delhi, Van Dyke was among seven foreign nationals arrested, including six Ukrainian spies.

=== Constitutionality ===
Under the constitution of India, law and order is a state subject. In 2020, Chhattisgarh state filed a case against the act in the Supreme Court that the said act violates the constitution. A United States Embassy cable accessed by The Hindu says that Central home minister P Chidambaram, in his discussion with FBI Director Robert Mueller, was coming 'perilously close to crossing constitutional limits' in empowering the NIA, and also that the National Investigation Agency's powers could be challenged in the courts as violating constitutional provisions on Centre-State relations. These ambiguities that the states' privilege is being encroached upon by the Centre using this act are resolved using the 'doctrine of Pith and Substance'. The central government states that the NIA is a necessary body to fight threats to national security.

== In popular culture ==
- NIA has been depicted in the Amazon Prime Video's series The Family Man featuring Manoj Bajpayee in the role of an NIA officer named Srikant Tiwari.
- L2: Empuraan is a 2025 Malayalam movie which shows a villain instructing the Home Minister to direct the NIA to issue an arrest warrant for a non-bailable offense. Due to political pressure from the central government, the officials then arrested a politician. The NIA logo was also used in the movie without permission, leading to controversy and NIA Kochi taking action against the film regarding defamation. It was later removed, and the movie was re-released.
- The NIA has been featured in the 2024 movie Article 370. Actress Yami Gautam portrays NIA officer Zooni Haksar.

== See also ==
- Anti-Terrorism Squad (ATS), special units under the state police forces for counter terrorism investigation and operations
- Central Bureau of Investigation investigates organised crime which is international, multi-state, or multi-agency
- Directorate of Revenue Intelligence investigates smuggling cases
- Enforcement Directorate investigates economic crimes
- Financial Intelligence Unit investigates money laundering
- Narcotics Control Bureau investigates drug trafficking
- NIA Most Wanted investigates and takes down alleged terrorists
- Indian Intelligence Community
- PRAHAAR, India's national counter-terrorism policy and strategy
