= Division bench =

Two or more judges hearing a case in the Indian judicial system

A Division Bench is a term in judicial system in India in which a case is heard and judged by at least two judges. However, if the bench during the hearing of any matter feels that the matter needs to be considered by a larger bench, such a matter is referred to a larger bench.
