= Core Dashboard =

Andhra Pradesh government software

- Launched: August 2014; 12 years ago
- Website: core.ap.gov.in

The Core Dashboard is aggregator of the information generated by various departments within the Government of Andhra Pradesh. It was conceived by former Chief minister of Andhra Pradesh Shri Nara Chandrababu Naidu and is the first platform of this kind in India. Different state governments in India have approached the AP Govt and launched their kind of dashboards in their states. It is being develop and managing by Real Time Governance Society (RTGS), a special department created to look after operations of RTGS state control center.

President of India Ram Nath Kovind and Britain's former Prime Minister Tony Blair have both visited the facility.
