= Goods and Services Tax 2.0 (Indian) =

2025 upgraded tax system in India

Goods and Services Tax 2.0 (India)
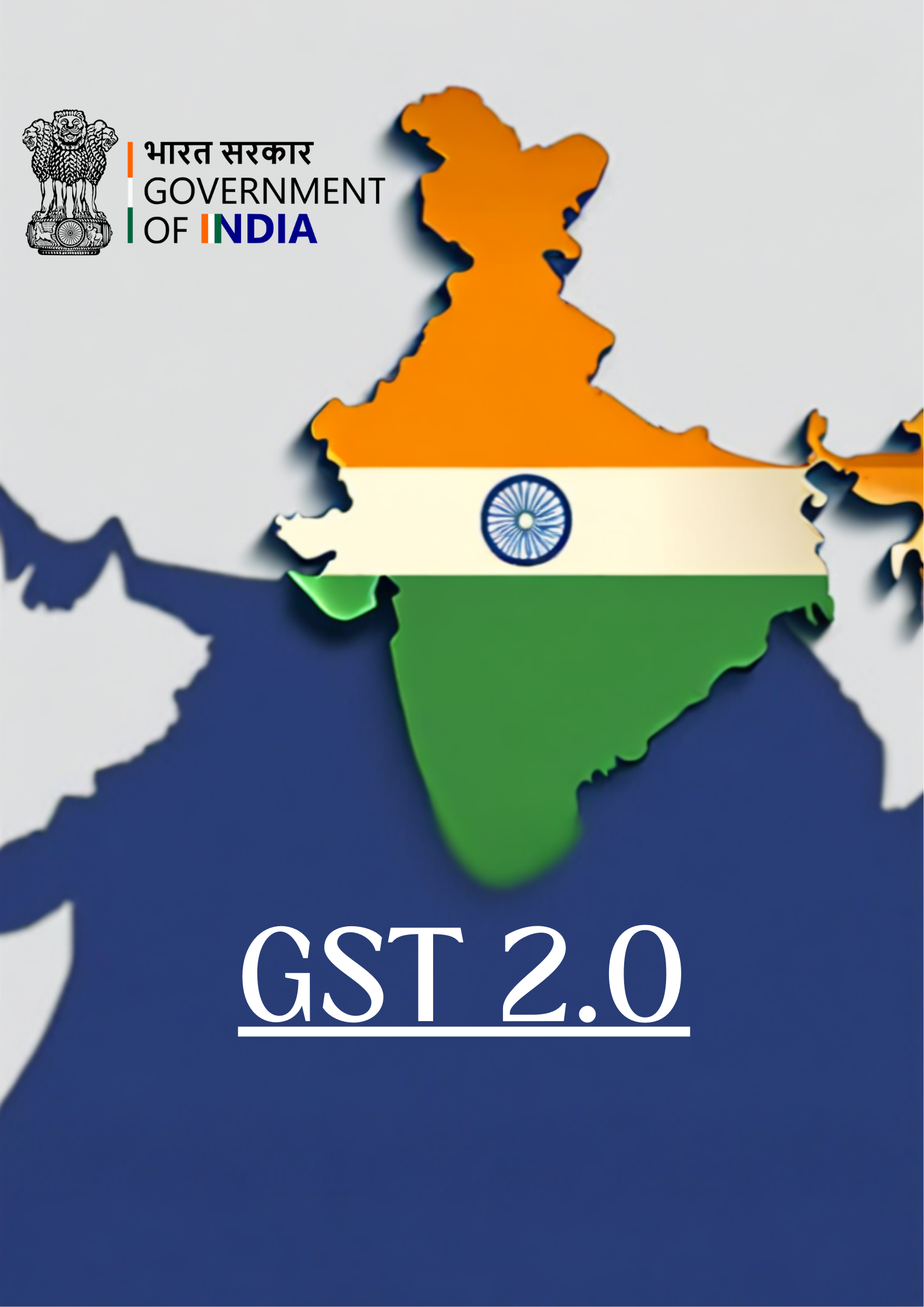

Agency overview
- Formed: 22 September 2025
- Preceding agency: GST (India), 2017
- Jurisdiction: Government of India
- Headquarters: New Delhi, India
- Minister responsible: Narendra Modi, Prime Minister of India
- Deputy Minister responsible: Nirmala Sitharaman, Ministry of Finance
- Parent agency: Ministry of Finance Government of India
- Website: http://www.gst.gov.in

Map
- All states of New GST 2.0

Goods and Services Tax 2.0, also known as GST 2.0, is an upgraded version of the original GST regime in India. It was officially launched on 22 September 2025 to streamline indirect taxation across the country. The reform was introduced to simplify the tax structure, reduce compliance burden for businesses, and make taxation more transparent for consumers.

The initiative was led by the Ministry of Finance, aiming to modernize the tax administration system using digital tools and data-driven monitoring. GST 2.0 maintained the core principles of a unified tax on goods and services, while revising tax rates, removing unnecessary exemptions, and ensuring smoother interstate trade.

GST 2.0 focused on technological integration and fostering a business-friendly environment, while maintaining revenue efficiency for the government. The Government of India pitched the reform as "strengthening India's vision of inclusive growth, sustainability, and empowerment of the next generation."

== History ==
The concept of GST 2.0 in India emerged in early 2025 as a continuation and upgrade of the Goods and Services Tax system implemented in 2017. The main aim of GST 2.0 was to simplify the tax structure, reduce compliance burden on businesses, and adjust tax rates according to economic needs.

The idea was first proposed by the Ministry of Finance after reviewing the impact of the 2017 GST framework. Several committees were formed to analyse which goods and services should have lower or higher tax rates, ensuring fairness and promoting economic growth.

By mid-2025, the new rates were announced and officially came into effect across India. The rollout included detailed guidelines for businesses, online portals for filing returns, and public awareness campaigns to help citizens understand the changes. GST 2.0 was widely seen as an effort to make India's indirect tax system more adaptive, transparent, and efficient.

Following the implementation of GST 2.0, the government closely monitored its impact on different sectors. Industries like manufacturing, retail, and services experienced changes in compliance procedures, while consumers noticed adjustments in prices for everyday goods. The feedback loop allowed authorities to make small tweaks to rates, making the system more flexible than the previous GST version.

Moreover, GST 2.0 focused heavily on digitisation. e-invoicing, automated return filing, and improved tracking mechanisms were introduced to reduce tax evasion and enhance transparency. Training programs and workshops were conducted across the country to help businesses adapt smoothly. This period marked a significant step in India's journey toward a more modern and efficient taxation framework.

== List of items (slab tax) ==
There are 4 levels of the list of Items of GST 2.0 :

- Level 1: Items with 0% GST (Low) :

Sl. No	Item/Category	Items	Previous GST rate	New GST rate
1	Foods (Daily)	Milk, bread, fruits, and vegetables	5%	0%
2	Individual items & life insurance	N/A	18%	0%
3	Stationery	Books, pens, pencils, and erasers	12%	0%

- Level 2: Items with 5% GST (Low) :

Sl. No	Item/Category	Items	Previous GST rate	New GST rate
1	Medical & Diagnostic	Thermometer, Medical grade oxygen, All diagnostic kits & reagents, Glumetor & test strips	12%	5%
2	Eye Care	Corrective spectacles	5%	5%
3	Agriculture equipment	Tractor types & parts, Tractor, Specified bio pesticides, micro nutrients, drip irrigation systems & sprinklers, agricultural, horticulture, and forestry machines for soil preparation, cultivation, harvesting, & threshing	12%–18%	5%
4	Personal Care & Hygiene	Hair, Oil, Shampoo, Toothpaste, Toilet soap bar, Tooth brushes, Shaving cream	18%	5%
5	Dairy & Snacks	Butter, Ghee, Cheese & dairy spreads, Pre-packaged namkeens, bhuija & mixtures	5%	5%
6	Household Items	Utensils, Sewing machine & parts	12%	5%
7	Baby & Clinical Items	Feeding bottles, Napkins for babies & clinical doctors	5%	5%

- Level 3: Items with 12% GST (Low) :

Sl. No	Item/Category	Items	Previous GST	New GST
1	Automobiles	Petrol & Petrol Hybrid, LPG, CNG Cars (not exceeding 1200 cc & 4000 mm)	28%	18%
2	Automobiles	Diesel & Diesel Hybrid (not exceeding 1500 cc & 4000 mm)	28%	18%
3	Automobiles	3 wheeled vehicles	28%	18%
4	Motorcycles	Motor cycles (350 cc & below)	28%	18%
5	Transport Vehicles	Motor vehicle for transport of goods	28%	18%
6	Home appliances	Air conditioners	28%	18%
7	Electronics	Television (above 32") including LED & LCD TVs	28%	18%
8	Electronics	Monitors & Projectors	28%	18%
9	Home appliances	Dish washing machines	28%	18%

- Level 4: Items with 40% GST (High) :

Sl. No	Item/Category	Items Name	Previous GST Rate	New GST Rate
1	Luxury & Leisure	Private( helicopter, Airplane), Alcohol, beer, wine, Soft drinks, Super bikes, large cars, Tobacco, cigarettes, Pan masala, Yachts and Luxury items	28%–30%	40%

== Revenue implications ==
The government anticipated a revenue loss of approximately ₹930 billion resulting from the reduction in GST rates across various categories. The introduction of a 40% GST slab was expected to generate an additional ₹450 billion in revenue. Thus, the net impact was estimated to be a loss of around ₹480 billion. According to research done by the government-owned State Bank of India, the reform was expected to lead to an estimated ₹700 billion boost for consumption, with the total aggregate demand reaching ₹1.98 trillion (short scale), owing to the multiplier effect.

== GST collection mechanism ==
The Goods and Services Tax (GST) in 2025 continues to function as a unified indirect tax system, applied on the supply of goods and services at every stage of production and distribution. Businesses registered under GST collect tax from their customers at the applicable rate and remit it to the government. This system ensures that the tax is levied only on the value added at each stage, preventing cascading taxes and promoting transparency.

Registered businesses can claim input tax credits for the GST paid on their inputs. The mechanism reduces the tax burden on the final consumer while ensuring that the government collects revenue efficiently. With the introduction of technology-driven compliance, the process of calculating, paying, and claiming GST has become largely automated, minimising errors and disputes.

All GST payments and filings are managed through a central online portal. Businesses submit periodic returns detailing sales, purchases, and taxes paid, while the portal facilitates refunds, adjustments, and real-time monitoring by tax authorities. The digital framework streamlines tax administration and is claimed to enhance tax compliance and accountability in India.

== Statistics ==
- Goods and Services Tax (India) Revenue Statistics

Revenue Collection (as per 2025) :

- Statistical Details of GST Revenue Collected

Reply :

- Statistical Details of GST Returns filed

== GST returns and filing ==
GST returns are the statements that taxpayers submit to the government to report their sales, purchases, and the GST collected or paid. In 2025, the filing process has been streamlined for both businesses and individuals, making it easier to comply. Registered taxpayers must file returns regularly to avoid penalties and ensure smooth input tax credit claims.

There are different types of GST returns depending on the taxpayer's category, such as GSTR-1 for outward supplies, GSTR-3B for monthly summary reporting, and GSTR-9 for annual filing. Each return captures details of the transactions, the GST liability, and the taxes paid or receivable.

The government also introduced simplified online filing platforms in 2025, allowing automated data entry, reconciliation, and faster processing. This reduces errors, ensures transparency, and strengthens compliance, benefiting both the administration and taxpayers.

== See also ==
- Goods and Services Tax
- Goods and Services Tax (India)
- Goods and Services Tax (India) Revenue Statistics
