= V. Lakshmikumaran =

Indian lawyer

V Lakshmikumaran
- Education: University of Madras
- Occupation: Lawyer
- Organization(s): Lakshmikumaran & Sridharan Attorneys
- Spouse: Malathi LakshmiKumaran
- Children: 2
- Website: lakshmisri.com

V. Lakshmikumaran is a former Indian Revenue Service officer and lawyer specialising in taxation and trade disputes. He currently serves as a Distinguished Fellow in NITI Aayog and as a legal adviser to Ministry of Commerce, India. He is the founder and managing partner of Delhi headquartered law firm LakshmiKumaran & Sridharan. He co-founded the firm in the year 1985 with his brother V. Sridharan who is now a designated senior advocate

== Education ==
He is a M.Sc. (Mathematics) and a LL.B. graduate from University of Madras.

== Career ==
He has advised the Indian government on Free Trade Agreements and represented Indian government before WTO Dispute Settlement Body

He advises clients in all areas of taxation, including International Taxation and Transfer Pricing, Goods and Services Tax, Customs, Excise, Service Tax, Value Added Tax (VAT), Foreign Trade Policy, Special Economic Zones, offering consulting, advisory, litigation and compliance services. He has also successfully represented clients from many countries in several anti-dumping, subsidy and trade investigations initiated by India.
