= LakshmiKumaran & Sridharan =

Law firm based in India

Lakshmikumaran & Sridharan
- Type: Partnership firm (90+ partners)
- Industry: Legal services
- Founded: 1985; 41 years ago
- Founder: V. Lakshmikumaran; V. Sridharan,
- Headquarters: New Delhi, India
- Number of locations: 14
- Area served: India; international
- Key people: V. Lakshmikumaran (Founder & Managing Partner); V. Sridharan (Co-founder); Malathi LakshmiKumaran (Head IPR)
- Number of employees: 800+
- Website: www.lkslaw.com

Lakshmikumaran & Sridharan is a full service law firm in India, with offices in Delhi NCR, Mumbai, Bangalore, Chennai, Hyderabad, Kolkata, Ahmedabad, and Pune. The firm comprises over 90+ partners specialising in Tax, Intellectual Property, Trade Remedies, General Corporate, M&A and other specialised verticals such as dispute resolution, real estate, competition law, compliance & investigations, and employment law.

The firm represented a diverse set of clients in tax litigation, including Fortune 500 companies, global investment funds, major Indian conglomerates, domestic and international banks, technology and media giants, family offices, and high-net-worth individuals and is consistently ranked as Band 1 in Tax, Life Sciences, Intellectual Property by Chambers and Partners

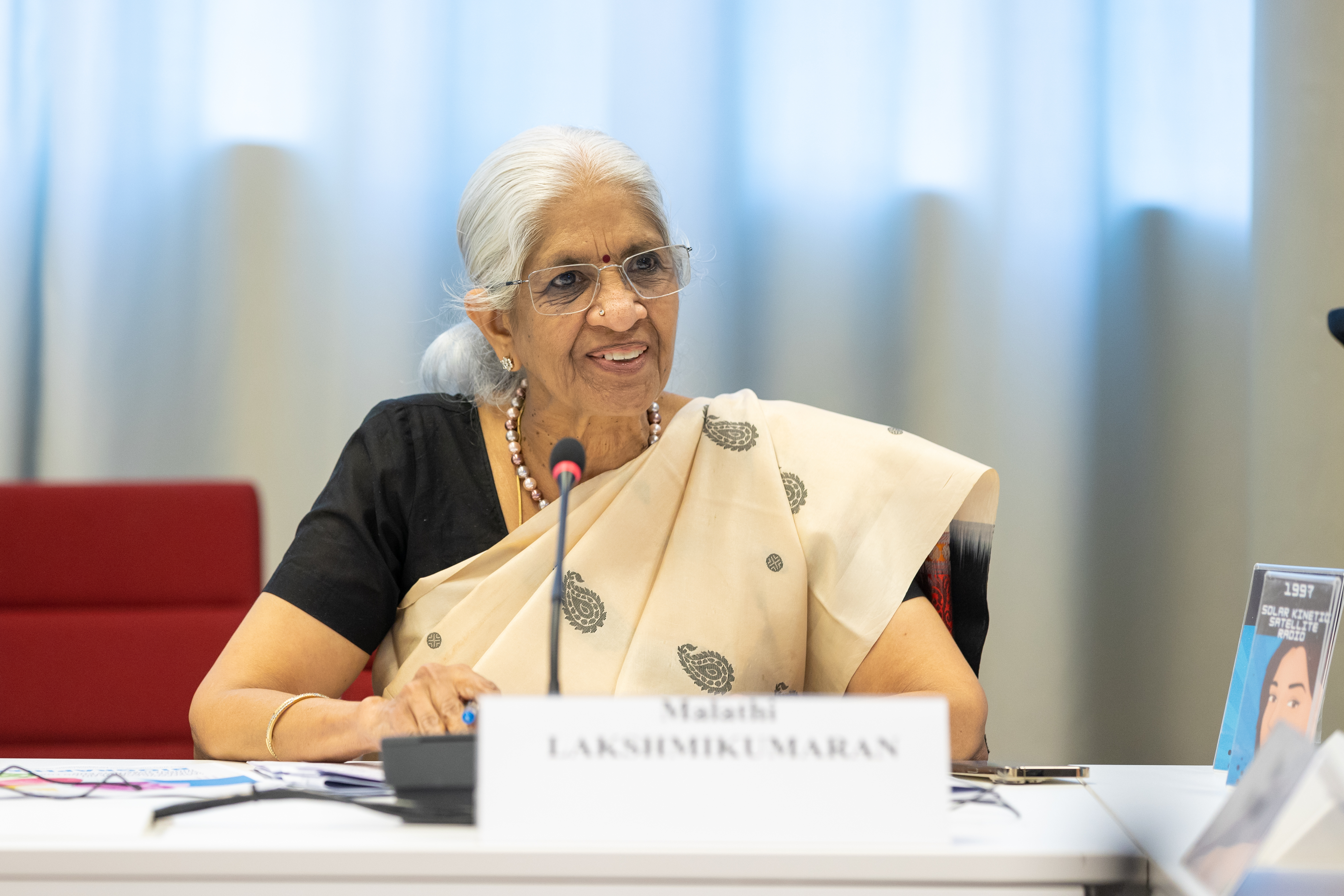
Malathi LakshmiKumaran at the World Intellectual Property Day 2023 "Women in Science – Shaping the Future" roundtable facilitates the "What it Takes for Women to Create Value from their Research and Innovation" panel discussion.

== Representation of the Government of India ==
The Firm represented Government of India on international trade matters. According to a study of Indian trade lawyers published by Cambridge University Press, the firm was retained by the government to act in United States — Countervailing Measures on Certain Hot-Rolled Carbon Steel Flat Products from India (also known as the "US–Steel Plate case"), a dispute brought by India before the World Trade Organization.

== Notable cases ==
The Firm has represented clients in a number of cases described in legal trade publications as landmark rulings, particularly in taxation, customs, and intellectual property law.

=== Taxation and indirect tax ===
The Firm represented online real-money gaming companies in litigation before the Supreme Court of India challenging the imposition of a 28% Goods and Services Tax (GST) on the sector, in what was described as one of the largest tax disputes in Indian history, with retrospective demands estimated at over ₹1.5 trillion.

Senior Advocate V. Sridharan, co-founder of the firm, appeared for the petitioner gaming companies, arguing that Rule 31A of the GST Rules, prescribing the valuation method for betting and gambling, lacked statutory backing under the Central GST Act, and that prize-pool contributions held in trust for winners did not constitute taxable "consideration" as distinct from platform fees. LKS partner Charanya Lakshmikumaran was also part of the legal team representing gaming companies at various stages of the proceedings, including in a related matter, Gameskraft v. GST.

On 27 May 2026, a bench of Justices J. B. Pardiwala and R. Mahadevan ruled that online gaming, fantasy sports, and other real-money games involving pooled stakes qualify as taxable actionable claims arising from betting and gambling under GST law, upholding the 28% levy and validating retrospective tax demands issued by the Directorate General of GST Intelligence. Following the ruling, Play Games24x7, Junglee Games, and Sachiko Gaming filed review petitions through Lakshmikumaran & Sridharan seeking reconsideration of the judgment on constitutional and legal grounds.

The firm represented a telecommunications tower company before the Supreme Court of India in a case concerning the eligibility of excise duty paid on telecom towers and shelters for CENVAT credit; the ruling was reported as providing significant relief to the telecommunications sector.

LKS was also involved in litigation before the Karnataka High Court concerning the Goods and Services Tax (GST) department's recovery practices. In a case involving Bundle Technologies Private Limited, the company had deposited amounts during a GST investigation at odd hours; the recovery was held to be involuntary and made without due process, entitling the company to a refund. A division bench of the Karnataka High Court subsequently affirmed the single-judge ruling that tax recovery made under threat and without the authority of law violates constitutional rights.

The firm also represented a multinational pharmaceutical company in an appeal before the Income-tax Appellate Tribunal regarding deductions available under Section 80-IB of the Income-tax Act, 1961, successfully contesting the tax department's position on profit-making units.

=== Intellectual property ===
LKS represented Novozymes in an appeal against the rejection of a patent application relating to enzyme stabilisation technology, obtaining a favourable ruling from the Madras High Court. The firm's intellectual property practice is regarded as being among the top tier in India, particularly for contentious patent litigation.

=== Trade remedies ===
The firm's international trade practice regularly represents domestic industry applicants before the Directorate General of Trade Remedies (DGTR) in anti-dumping investigations, including a 2020s-era investigation into imports of insoluble sulphur from China and Japan, initiated on an application filed by Oriental Carbon & Chemicals Limited through LKS.
