= Craftsvilla =

Indian online commerce website

- Company type: Private
- Website type: E-commerce (Online shopping)
- Available in: English
- Headquarters: Mumbai, Maharashtra, India
- Area served: India
- Key people: Manoj Gupta (CEO), Monica Gupta (COO)
- Industry: Internet
- Products: Apparel, jewellery, shoes, accessories, beauty and home accessories
- Website: craftsvilla.com
- Launched: 2011
- Current status: Online

Craftsvilla is an Indian e-commerce portal that sells ethnic apparel, footwear, fashion accessories, beauty products, handcrafted home accessories and other ethnic fashion and lifestyle products. The company is headquartered in Mumbai, Maharashtra.

== Overview ==
Craftsvilla.com uses an online marketplace model by aggregating artisans, designers and retailers from all over India onto a single platform and connects local artisans and designers directly to global customers.

The model focuses on removing middlemen, increasing the livelihood of local artisans and designers, helping them create/promote their brand, and preserve the Indian culture, traditions and values. The company is pegged at around $300–500 million in size. The startup claims to have over 25,000 artisans and designers selling over 4 million products. At present, Craftsvilla charges a 20% commission on each transaction excluding service tax.

== Partners ==
Craftsvilla has tied up with the Ministry of Textiles, Government of India, for e-marketing of handloom products from small weavers. As per this agreement, Craftsvilla has tied up with Weavesmart, an online marketplace that offers handloom weaves from across India.

== History ==
The company was co-founded by Manoj Gupta, a venture capitalist, and Monica Gupta in 2011 with funding from India-based Nexus Venture Partners and US-based Lightspeed Venture Partners. The startup was launched with 80 employees and five offices across India. By 2012, the startup completely exhausted the Rs10 crore series-A round of funding, following which it downsized to a 10-member team and continued operations out of a one-room office.

According to an article in Economic Times, the startup saw a 6% month on month growth in 2013 and 2014. In April 2015, Craftsvilla raised $18 million in a series B round of funding from Sequoia Capital India, Lightspeed Venture Partners, Nexus Venture Partners, Global Founders Capital and Apoletto. In November, the startup raised another $34 million in series C funding from the same investors. Following this fresh round of investments, the startup claimed to have seen a 10% month on month growth and hired close to 200 people. In December 2016, Craftsvilla launched a women's ethnic wear brand ‘Avanya’. In April 2017, Craftsvilla launched its third in-house brand Anuswara in Bengaluru.

== Acquisitions ==
In February 2016, Craftsvilla acquired on-demand shipping service provider startup Sendd for about $5 million, to strengthen and streamline its logistics capabilities. Mumbai-based Sendd was founded by IIT Bombay Alumni ( Nav Agrawal and two others) in April 2015. The company is backed by Kae Capital, and after acquisition the firm will get an equity in Craftsvilla.

Sendd had its services in Mumbai and was enabling over 1,500 orders a day with average ticket size being INR 160, before getting acquired. The team at Sendd has created a virtual logistics platform, using which any e-commerce company can send its parcels using a number of available courier partners. Apart from Craftsvilla, it has now 10 other clients.

Later in February, Craftsvilla acquired PlaceofOrigin, a marketplace for ethnic foods. The startup, founded by two ex-bankers Sudarsan Metla and Ashish Nichani in 2014, brings together food producers of Indian foods and local specialty foods. In April 2016, the startup acquired women's clothes rental platform F2SO4 in an all-stock deal.

== Marketing ==
In 2015, Craftsvilla celebrated World Ethnic Day on June 19. It brought in Bollywood actress Vidya Balan as the face of the campaign. In the same year, Craftsvilla launched Miss Ethnic Contest to promote ethnic wear among women. Bollywood actress Kareena Kapoor was the face of this campaign.

== See also ==
- Online shopping
- Ecommerce in India
