= GSTN =

GSTN may refer to:

- General Switched Telephone Network or public switched telephone network
- Goods and Services Tax Network, a non-profit organization with a centralized portal for tax stakeholders, government agencies, and taxpayers in India
