= Local Body Tax =

City-level tax in India

Local Body Tax, popularly known by its abbreviation as LBT, is the tax imposed by the local civic bodies of India on the entry of goods into a local area for consumption, use or sale therein. The tax is imposed based on the Entry 52 of the State List from the Schedule VII of the Constitution of India which reads; "Taxes on the entry of goods into a local area for consumption, use or sale therein." The tax is to be paid by the trader to the civic bodies and the rules and regulations of these vary amongst different States in India. The LBT is now partially abolished as of 1 August 2015.

== History and implementation ==
The tax supersedes the "octroi" and "Cess" system of taxing. The octroi system, which originates from the ancient Roman times, levied tax on the goods while they entered the limits of the civic body. In it, the trucks or goods carriers had to pay tax while they entered the city limits at the octroi check posts. As of 2013, the Indian state of Maharashtra and one state in the Northeast African country of Ethiopia are the only known regions to impose octroi. The system was in practice in Maharashtra since 1965. In March 2013, in a joint session of the Maharashtra Legislative Assembly and the Maharashtra Legislative Council, the Chief Minister of Maharashtra Prithviraj Chavan announced that the octroi and cess will be cancelled and LBT would be levied in the municipalities of Mumbai, Thane, Pune, Nagpur and Pimpri-Chinchwad in the same year. The LBT was in action in other 20 municipalities at that time. Other municipalities implemented LBT effective from 1 April 2013 and Mumbai was planned to implement from 1 October 2013. The law for the same had been passed in 2009 and rules for implementation in various regions had to be drafted. Chavan noted in an interview that with LBT, the free flow of goods will be possible which was hindered by the octroi collection at the check posts.

== Nature ==
The tax is to be paid by a registered trader within 40 days. As per the rules, every trader whose annual turnover of purchase and sales of the goods included in the taxable schedule is not less than ₹5000 and if the annual turnover of purchase and sales of all the goods is not less than ₹100,000 (one lakh) is supposed to be registered with the local civic body i.e. municipality. The payment of the tax is to be done by the trader through an online portal, cheque, demand draft or by cash to a designated bank account or special counters opened for the same by the civic bodies.

Additionally, some concessions are defined. For example, when LBT-paid goods are exported outside the city, a 90% of the paid LBT can be refunded based on some conditions. There are also concessions on goods that are imported again after they were sent out for certain processing or outside India.

With implementation of LBT, dealers are supposed to maintain their records of business and file half-yearly returns. The registration number assigned by the civic body also has to be included in the bill or invoice. The traders have to maintain the records for 10 years.

In case of delayed or non-payment of LBT, or failure to register, or failure to present bill/invoice/other records, or failure to state correct liability, various penalties are charged.

== Where is LBT Applicable ==
=== Gujarat ===
LBT is not levied upon in the state of Gujarat. The octroi was cancelled in 2007 and to compensate that, Value Added Tax (VAT) was increased. However, as of April 2013, Ahmedabad Municipal Corporation (AMC) was planning to add on a separate LBT apart from the current VAT structure.

=== Maharashtra ===
LBT was introduced in Maharashtra in a phased manner. LBT was introduced in the year 2010 in Tier III cities. In 2013 it was made applicable to tier II and I cities. The table below shows where LBT was applicable and from when.

Municipal Corporation	LBT made applicable
Thane	1 April 2013
Bhiwandi	22 May 2013
Pune	1 April 2013
Nagpur	1 April 2013

The LBT stands cancelled as of 1 August 2015 in Maharashtra for most traders.

== Amnesty Scheme ==
Maharashtra State Government has issued notification on 3 June 2015 starting Amnesty Scheme for LBT.

== Protests ==
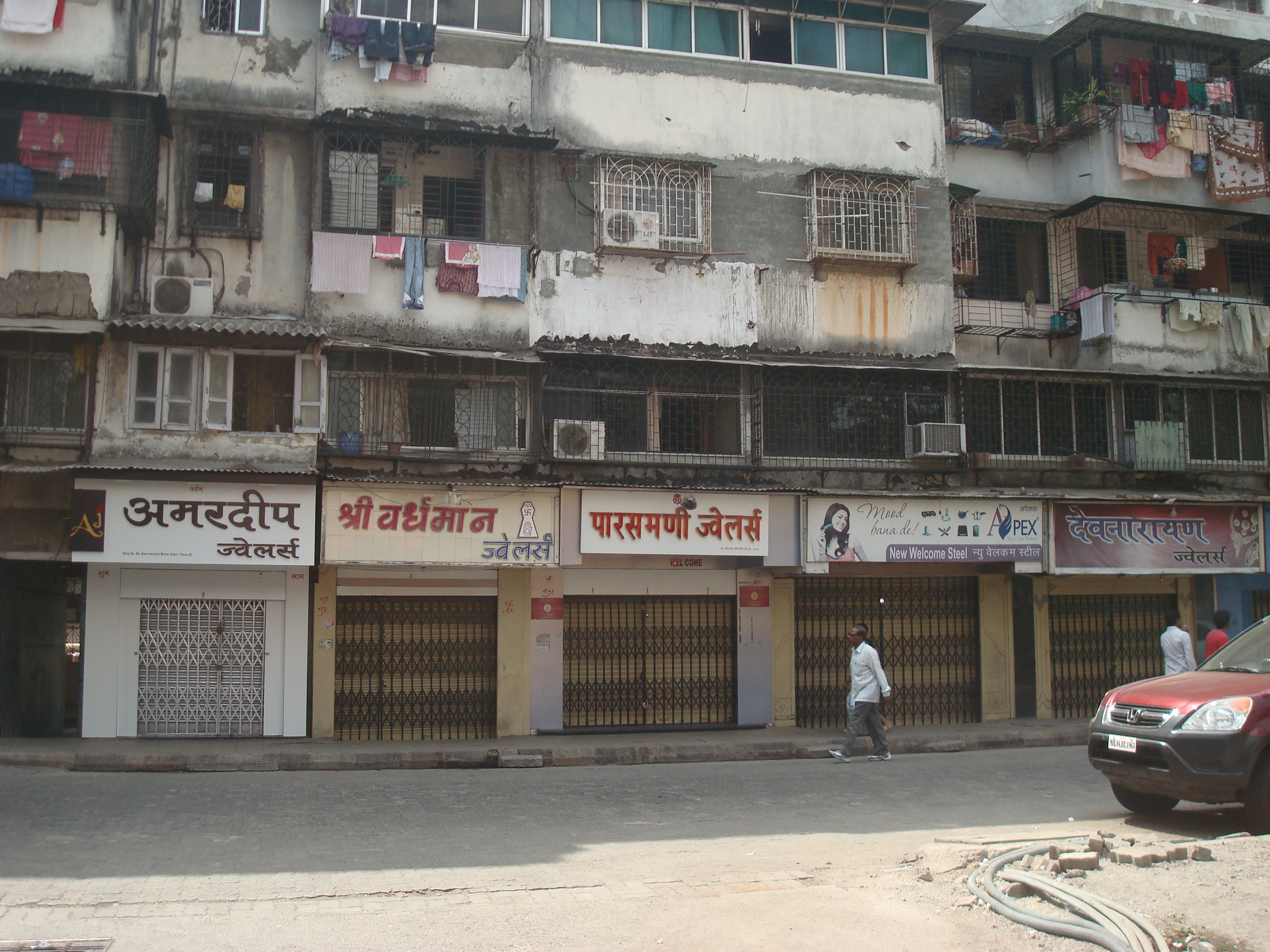
Shops in Thane East remained closed in protest.

After the introduction of LBT in March 2013, various protests were organised by the trader's associations in various cities in India, mostly Maharashtra. The traders protested for the fear that such law would increase harassment and corruption from local authorities. This tax was also noted as extraneous while Value Added Tax (VAT) was still under implementation.^{[Note I]} Proposals were also made to increase VAT instead of adding this extra tax. However the same was quashed by the government as it would mean that the money collected by state government through VAT would have to be transferred to civic bodies in form of grant. In 2014, the LBT was abolished and octroi reestablished.
