= Securities Transaction Tax =

Indian tax

Securities Transaction Tax (STT) is a tax payable in India on the value of securities (excluding commodities and currency) transacted through a recognised stock exchange. As of 2016, it is 0.1% for delivery based equity trading.

STT does not apply to off-market transactions or on commodity or currency transactions. The original tax rate was set at 0.125% for a delivery-based equity transaction and 0.025% on an INTER-day transaction. The rate was set at 0.017% on all Futures and Options transactions.

STT was originally introduced in 2004 by the then Finance Minister, P. Chidambaram to stop tax avoidance of capital gains tax. The government reduced this tax in the 2013 budget after protests for years by the brokers and the trading community. The revised STT for delivery-based equity trading is 0.1% on the turnover. For Futures, the tax has been reduced to 0.01% on the sell-side only. For Equity Options, the STT has been reduced to 0.05% on the sell side of the premium amount. The rest of the tax structure remains as is. STT is a direct tax.

The Government announced on 24 March 2023, that STT will increase by 25% effective 1 April 2023. STT on Futures (sell side) will be 0.0125% from the current 0.01% and STT on Options(sell side) will be 0.0625% from 0.05%.

The STT is levied and collected by the Union Government of India. STT can be paid by the seller or the purchaser depending on the transaction. The Securities Contract (Regulation) Act, 1956 defines Securities the transaction of which are taxable under STT.

== Scope of STT ==
According to the Securities Contracts (Regulation) Act, 1956, STT would be applicable on following securities:

- Shares, bonds, debentures, debenture stock or other marketable securities of a like nature in or of any incorporated company or other body corporate
- Derivatives
- Units or any other instrument issued by any collective investment scheme to the investors in such schemes
- Security receipt as defined in section 2(zg) of the Securitisation and Reconstruction of Financial Assets and Enforcement of Security Interest Act, 2002
- Government securities of equity nature
- Rights or interest in securities
- Equity-oriented mutual funds

STT is not applicable for any off-market transaction.

== STT Computation ==
As per the Finance Act 2004, and modified by Finance Act 2008 (18 of 2008) STT on the transactions executed on the Exchange shall be as under:

Sr.No.	Taxable securities transaction	Current rate from 01.06.2016	New rate from 01.04.2023	Payable by
a	Sale of an option in securities	0.05%	0.0625%	Seller
b	Sale of an option in securities, where option is exercised	0.125%	0.125%	Buyer
c	Sale of a futures in securities	0.01%	0.0125%	Seller

Note that Service Tax, Surcharge and Education Cess are not applicable on STT.

- Value of taxable securities transaction relating to an "option in securities" shall be the option premium, in case of sale of an option in securities.
- Value of taxable securities transaction relating to an "option in securities" shall be the settlement price less the strike price, in case of sale of an option in securities, where option is exercised.

== Income Tax and STT ==
Taxation of profit or loss from securities transactions depends on whether the activity of purchasing and selling of shares / derivatives is classified as investment activity or business activity.

Treatment of STT also depends upon whether the income from these securities transactions are included under the head "Income from Capital Gains" or under the head ‘Profits and Gains of Business or Profession’.

=== Scenario 1: Income from Capital gains ===
This refers to the scenario where the assessee is either Salaried or is engaged in some other business or profession and trading in securities is not the main line of business. In such cases gains or losses from securities transactions are taxed under the head "Income from Capital Gains".

Gains or losses are subject to Short Term capital Gains (STCG) or Long Term capital Gains (LTCG) tax depending upon the period of holding, i.e., if the holding period is less than Or equal to 12 months, gains are classified as STCG and if the holding period is more than 12 months, gains are classified as LTCG. Any equity share, which has been sold through a recognised stock exchange and on which STT has been paid and if it comes under LTCG, it'll be taxed at 10% whereas in case of STCG of such shares, the gains shall be taxed only at 15%, plus surcharge and education cess under section 111A of the Act.

=== Scenario 2: Profits and Gains of Business or Profession ===
This refers to the scenario where main business of the assessee is trading in securities. In such cases the gains or losses are classified as business income, which is taxed at the regular rate of income-tax.

STT paid in respect of taxable securities transactions entered into in the course of business shall be allowed as deduction under section 36 of the Income-tax Act. Until 31 March 2008, the amount of STT paid was allowed as rebate under section 88E of the Income-tax Act. However, with effect from 1 April 2008, rebate available under section 88E has been discontinued.
