= Goods and Services Tax (India) Revenue Statistics =

Indian tax data

From 1 May 2018 onwards Ministry of Finance of Government of India started releasing monthly GST revenue collection data via official press release through Press Information Bureau. And to further improve transparency Government of India started issuing state-wise monthly collection data from 1 January 2020.

== Revenue Collections ==
=== Monthly National Revenue Collections ===
Month	2024-25		2023-24		2022-23		2021-22		2020-21		2019-20		2018-19		2017-18			
Month	Collections	M-O-M Change	Collections	M-O-M Change	Collections	M-O-M Change	Collections	M-O-M Change	Collections	M-O-M Change	Collections	M-O-M Change	Collections	M-O-M Change	Collections	M-O-M Change		
April	₹210,267 crore (US$22 billion)	▲	₹187,035 crore (US$20 billion)	▲	₹167,540 crore (US$18 billion)	▲	₹139,708 crore (US$15 billion)	▲	₹32,294 crore (US$3.4 billion)	▼	₹113,865 crore (US$12 billion)	▲	₹103,459 crore (US$11 billion)	▲	NA			
May	₹172,739 crore (US$18 billion)	▼	₹157,090 crore (US$16 billion)	▼	₹140,885 crore (US$15 billion)	▼	₹97,821 crore (US$10 billion)	▲	₹62,009 crore (US$6.5 billion)	▲	₹100,289 crore (US$11 billion)	▼	₹94,016 crore (US$9.8 billion)	▼	NA			
June	₹173,813 crore (US$18 billion)	▲	₹161,497 crore (US$17 billion)	▲	₹144,616 crore (US$15 billion)	▲	₹92,800 crore (US$9.7 billion)	▼	₹90,917 crore (US$9.5 billion)	▲	₹99,938 crore (US$10 billion)	▼	₹95,610 crore (US$10 billion)	▲	NA			
July	₹182,075 crore (US$19 billion)	▲	₹165,105 crore (US$17 billion)	▲	₹148,995 crore (US$16 billion)	▲	₹116,393 crore (US$12 billion)	▲	₹87,422 crore (US$9.2 billion)	▼	₹102,083 crore (US$11 billion)	▲	₹96,483 crore (US$10 billion)	▲	₹21,572 crore (US$2.3 billion)	Steady		
August	₹174,962 crore (US$18 billion)	▼	₹159,069 crore (US$17 billion)	▼	₹143,612 crore (US$15 billion)	▼	₹112,020 crore (US$12 billion)	▼	₹86,449 crore (US$9.1 billion)	▼	₹98,203 crore (US$10 billion)	▲	₹93,960 crore (US$9.8 billion)	▼	₹95,633 crore (US$10 billion)	▲		
September	₹173,240 crore (US$18 billion)	▼	₹147,686 crore (US$15 billion)	▲	₹162,712 crore (US$17 billion)	▲	₹147,686 crore (US$15 billion)	▲	₹117,010 crore (US$12 billion)	▲	₹95,480 crore (US$10 billion)	▼	₹91,917 crore (US$9.6 billion)	▼	₹94,442 crore (US$9.9 billion)	▲	₹94,064 crore (US$9.9 billion)	▼
October	₹187,346 crore (US$20 billion)	▲	₹172,003 crore (US$18 billion)	▲	₹151,718 crore (US$16 billion)	▲	₹130,127 crore (US$14 billion)	▲	₹105,155 crore (US$11 billion)	▲	₹95,380 crore (US$10 billion)	▲	₹100,710 crore (US$11 billion)	▲	₹93,333 crore (US$9.8 billion)	▼		
November	₹1,76,200 crore		₹167,929 crore (US$18 billion)	▼	₹145,867 crore (US$15 billion)	▼	₹131,526 crore (US$14 billion)	▲	₹104,963 crore (US$11 billion)	▼	₹103,491 crore (US$11 billion)	▲	₹97,637 crore (US$10 billion)	▼	₹83,780 crore (US$8.8 billion)	▼		
December	1,74,550 crore		₹164,882 crore (US$17 billion)	▼	₹149,507 crore (US$16 billion)	▲	₹129,780 crore (US$14 billion)	▼	₹115,174 crore (US$12 billion)	▲	₹103,184 crore (US$11 billion)	▼	₹94,726 crore (US$9.9 billion)	▼	₹84,314 crore (US$8.8 billion)	▲		
January	1,93,384		₹172,129 crore (US$18 billion)	▲	₹157,554 crore (US$16 billion)	▲	₹140,986 crore (US$15 billion)	▲	₹119,875 crore (US$13 billion)	▲	₹110,818 crore (US$12 billion)	▲	₹102,503 crore (US$11 billion)	▲	₹89,825 crore (US$9.4 billion)	▲		
February			₹168,337 crore (US$18 billion)	▼	₹149,577 crore (US$16 billion)	▼	₹133,026 crore (US$14 billion)	▼	₹113,143 crore (US$12 billion)	▼	₹105,366 crore (US$11 billion)	▲	₹97,247 crore (US$10 billion)	▼	₹85,962 crore (US$9.0 billion)	▼		
March			₹178,484 crore (US$19 billion)	▲	₹160,122 crore (US$17 billion)	▲	₹142,095 crore (US$15 billion)	▲	₹123,902 crore (US$13 billion)	▲	₹97,597 crore (US$10 billion)	▼	₹106,577 crore (US$11 billion)	▲	₹92,167 crore (US$9.7 billion)	▲		
Annual Average	₹191,503 crore (US$20 billion)	▲	₹168,000 crore (US$18 billion)	▲	₹149,772 crore (US$16 billion)	▲	₹123,608 crore (US$13 billion)	▲	₹94,731.91 crore (US$9.9 billion)	▼	₹101,844 crore (US$11 billion)	▲	₹98,114 crore (US$10 billion)	▲	₹82,294 crore (US$8.6 billion) (Note: For 9 months only)			

Official Source

== State-Wise Monthly Revenue Collections ==
=== States ===
Note: Below tables does not include GST on import of goods

==== Andhra Pradesh ====
Month	2021-22		2020-21		2019-20		2018-19	
Month	Collections	M-O-M Change	Collections	M-O-M Change	Collections	M-O-M Change	Collections	M-O-M Change
April	NA		NA		NA		NA	
May	NA		NA		NA		NA	
June	NA		₹2,367 crore (US$250 million)		₹2,232 crore (US$230 million)	Steady	NA	
July			₹3,130 crore (US$330 million)	▲	₹3,138 crore (US$330 million)	▲	NA	
August			₹1,955 crore (US$200 million)	▼	₹2,115 crore (US$220 million)	▼	NA	
September			₹2,141 crore (US$220 million)	▲	₹1,985 crore (US$210 million)	▼	NA	
October			₹2,480 crore (US$260 million)	▲	₹1,975 crore (US$210 million)	▼	NA	
November			₹2,507 crore (US$260 million)	▲	₹2,230 crore (US$230 million)	▲	NA	
December			₹2,581 crore (US$270 million)	▲	₹2,265 crore (US$240 million)	▲	₹2,049 crore (US$210 million)	Steady
January			NA		₹2,356 crore (US$250 million)	▲	₹2,159 crore (US$230 million)	▲
February			₹2,652.57 crore (US$280 million)		₹2,563 crore (US$270 million)	▲	₹2,088 crore (US$220 million)	▼
March			₹2,685.09 crore (US$280 million)	▲	₹2,548 crore (US$270 million)	▼	₹2,589 crore (US$270 million)	▲

==== Arunachal Pradesh ====
Month	2021-22		2020-21		2019-20		2018-19	
Month	Collections	M-O-M Change	Collections	M-O-M Change	Collections	M-O-M Change	Collections	M-O-M Change
April	NA		NA		NA		NA	
May	NA		NA		NA		NA	
June	NA		₹49 crore (US$5.1 million)		₹48 crore (US$5.0 million)	Steady	NA	
July			₹33 crore (US$3.5 million)	▼	₹49 crore (US$5.1 million)	▲	NA	
August			₹35 crore (US$3.7 million)	▲	₹45 crore (US$4.7 million)	▼	NA	
September			₹35 crore (US$3.7 million)	Steady	₹44 crore (US$4.6 million)	▼	NA	
October			₹98 crore (US$10 million)	▲	₹41 crore (US$4.3 million)	▼	NA	
November			₹60 crore (US$6.3 million)	▼	₹36 crore (US$3.8 million)	▼	NA	
December			₹46 crore (US$4.8 million)	▼	₹58 crore (US$6.1 million)	▲	₹26 crore (US$2.7 million)	Steady
January			NA		₹52 crore (US$5.4 million)	▼	₹38 crore (US$4.0 million)	▲
February			₹61.36 crore (US$6.4 million)		₹48 crore (US$5.0 million)	▼	₹32 crore (US$3.4 million)	▼
March			₹92.03 crore (US$9.6 million)	▲	₹67 crore (US$7.0 million)	▲	₹85 crore (US$8.9 million)	▲

==== Assam ====
Month	2021-22		2020-21		2019-20		2018-19	
Month	Collections	M-O-M Change	Collections	M-O-M Change	Collections	M-O-M Change	Collections	M-O-M Change
April	NA		NA		NA		NA	
May	NA		NA		NA		NA	
June	NA		₹966 crore (US$100 million)		₹798 crore (US$84 million)	Steady	NA	
July			₹723 crore (US$76 million)	▼	₹795 crore (US$83 million)	▼	NA	
August			₹709 crore (US$74 million)	▼	₹768 crore (US$80 million)	▼	NA	
September			₹912 crore (US$96 million)	▲	₹848 crore (US$89 million)	▲	NA	
October			₹1,017 crore (US$110 million)	▲	₹888 crore (US$93 million)	▲	NA	
November			₹946 crore (US$99 million)	▼	₹968 crore (US$100 million)	▲	NA	
December			₹984 crore (US$100 million)	▲	₹991 crore (US$100 million)	▲	₹743 crore (US$78 million)	Steady
January			NA		₹820 crore (US$86 million)	▼	₹787 crore (US$82 million)	▼
February			₹945.84 crore (US$99 million)		₹924 crore (US$97 million)	▲	₹736 crore (US$77 million)	▼
March			₹1,004.65 crore (US$110 million)	▲	₹932 crore (US$98 million)	▲	₹956 crore (US$100 million)	▲

==== Bihar ====
Month	2021-22		2020-21		2019-20		2018-19	
Month	Collections	M-O-M Change	Collections	M-O-M Change	Collections	M-O-M Change	Collections	M-O-M Change
April	NA		NA		NA		NA	
May	NA		NA		NA		NA	
June	NA		₹1,162 crore (US$120 million)		₹1,003 crore (US$110 million)	Steady	NA	
July			₹1,061 crore (US$110 million)	▼	₹1,160 crore (US$120 million)	▲	NA	
August			₹967 crore (US$100 million)	▼	₹981 crore (US$100 million)	▼	NA	
September			₹996 crore (US$100 million)	▲	₹986 crore (US$100 million)	▲	NA	
October			₹1,010 crore (US$110 million)	▲	₹940 crore (US$98 million)	▼	NA	
November			₹970 crore (US$100 million)	▼	₹1,107 crore (US$120 million)	▲	NA	
December			₹1,067 crore (US$110 million)	▲	₹1,016 crore (US$110 million)	▼	₹909 crore (US$95 million)	Steady
January			NA		₹1,122 crore (US$120 million)	▲	₹1,039 crore (US$110 million)	▲
February			₹1,127.99 crore (US$120 million)		₹1,121 crore (US$120 million)	▼	₹961 crore (US$100 million)	▼
March			₹1,195.75 crore (US$130 million)	▲	₹1,056 crore (US$110 million)	▼	₹1,177 crore (US$120 million)	▲

==== Chhattisgarh ====
Month	2021-22		2020-21		2019-20		2018-19	
Month	Collections	M-O-M Change	Collections	M-O-M Change	Collections	M-O-M Change	Collections	M-O-M Change
April	NA		NA		NA		NA	
May	NA		NA		NA		NA	
June	NA		₹2,549 crore (US$270 million)		₹2,093 crore (US$220 million)	Steady	NA	
July	₹2,432 crore (US$250 million)		₹1,832 crore (US$190 million)	▼	₹2,002 crore (US$210 million)	▼	NA	
August	₹2,391 crore (US$250 million)		₹1,994 crore (US$210 million)	▲	₹1,873 crore (US$200 million)	▼	NA	
September	₹2,233 crore (US$230 million)		₹1,841 crore (US$190 million)	▼	₹1,490 crore (US$160 million)	▼	NA	
October	₹2,392 crore (US$250 million)		₹1,974 crore (US$210 million)	▲	₹1,570 crore (US$160 million)	▲	NA	
November	₹2,454 crore (US$260 million)		₹2,181 crore (US$230 million)	▲	₹2,176 crore (US$230 million)	▲	NA	
December	₹2,582 crore (US$270 million)		₹2,349 crore (US$250 million)	▲	₹2,136 crore (US$220 million)	▼	₹1,852 crore (US$190 million)	Steady
January			NA		₹2,155 crore (US$230 million)	▲	₹2,064 crore (US$220 million)	▲
February	₹2,783 crore (US$290 million)		₹2,453.10 crore (US$260 million)		₹2,274 crore (US$240 million)	▲	₹2,068 crore (US$220 million)	▲
March	₹2,720 crore (US$280 million)		₹2,544.13 crore (US$270 million)	▲	₹2,093 crore (US$220 million)	▼	₹2,143 crore (US$220 million)	▲

==== Goa ====
Month	2021-22		2020-21		2019-20		2018-19	
Month	Collections	M-O-M Change	Collections	M-O-M Change	Collections	M-O-M Change	Collections	M-O-M Change
April	NA		NA		NA		NA	
May	NA		NA		NA		NA	
June	NA		₹324 crore (US$34 million)		₹338 crore (US$35 million)	Steady	NA	
July			₹257 crore (US$27 million)	▼	₹361 crore (US$38 million)	▲	NA	
August			₹213 crore (US$22 million)	▼	₹325 crore (US$34 million)	▼	NA	
September			₹240 crore (US$25 million)	▲	₹311 crore (US$33 million)	▼	NA	
October			₹310 crore (US$32 million)	▲	₹311 crore (US$33 million)	Steady	NA	
November			₹300 crore (US$31 million)	▼	₹342 crore (US$36 million)	▲	NA	
December			₹342 crore (US$36 million)	▲	₹363 crore (US$38 million)	▲	₹342 crore (US$36 million)	Steady
January			NA		₹437 crore (US$46 million)	▲	₹394 crore (US$41 million)	▲
February			₹343.80 crore (US$36 million)		₹411 crore (US$43 million)	▼	₹401 crore (US$42 million)	▲
March			₹344.28 crore (US$36 million)	▲	₹316 crore (US$33 million)	▼	₹389 crore (US$41 million)	▼

==== Gujarat ====
Month	2021-22		2020-21		2019-20		2018-19	
Month	Collections	M-O-M Change	Collections	M-O-M Change	Collections	M-O-M Change	Collections	M-O-M Change
April	NA		NA		NA		NA	
May	NA		NA		NA		NA	
June	NA		₹6,025 crore (US$630 million)		₹6,424 crore (US$670 million)	Steady	NA	
July			₹5,621 crore (US$590 million)	▼	₹6,411 crore (US$670 million)	▼	NA	
August			₹6,030 crore (US$630 million)	▲	₹6,185 crore (US$650 million)	▼	NA	
September			₹6,090 crore (US$640 million)	▲	₹5,741 crore (US$600 million)	▼	NA	
October			₹6,787 crore (US$710 million)	▲	₹5,888 crore (US$620 million)	▲	NA	
November			₹7,566 crore (US$790 million)	▲	₹6,805 crore (US$710 million)	▲	NA	
December			₹7,469 crore (US$780 million)	▼	₹6,621 crore (US$690 million)	▼	₹5,619 crore (US$590 million)	Steady
January			NA		₹7,330 crore (US$770 million)	▲	₹6,185 crore (US$650 million)	▲
February			₹8,221.23 crore (US$860 million)		₹7,216 crore (US$760 million)	▼	₹6,507 crore (US$680 million)	▲
March			₹8,197.04 crore (US$860 million)	▼	₹6,820 crore (US$710 million)	▼	₹6,521 crore (US$680 million)	▲

==== Haryana ====
Month	2021-22		2020-21		2019-20		2018-19	
Month	Collections	M-O-M Change	Collections	M-O-M Change	Collections	M-O-M Change	Collections	M-O-M Change
April	NA		NA		NA		NA	
May	NA		NA		NA		NA	
June	NA		₹3,697 crore (US$390 million)		₹4,889 crore (US$510 million)	Steady	NA	
July			₹3,483 crore (US$360 million)	▼	₹4,617 crore (US$480 million)	▼	NA	
August			₹4,373 crore (US$460 million)	▲	₹4,474 crore (US$470 million)	▼	NA	
September			₹4,712 crore (US$490 million)	▲	₹4,110 crore (US$430 million)	▼	NA	
October			₹5,433 crore (US$570 million)	▲	₹4,578 crore (US$480 million)	▲	NA	
November			₹5,928 crore (US$620 million)	▲	₹5,904 crore (US$620 million)	▲	NA	
December			₹5,747 crore (US$600 million)	▼	₹5,365 crore (US$560 million)	▼	₹4,646 crore (US$490 million)	Steady
January			NA		₹5,487 crore (US$570 million)	▲	₹4,815 crore (US$500 million)	▲
February			₹5,589.81 crore (US$590 million)		₹5,266 crore (US$550 million)	▼	₹4,873 crore (US$510 million)	▲
March			₹5,709.60 crore (US$600 million)	▲	₹4,874 crore (US$510 million)	▼	₹4,561 crore (US$480 million)	▼

==== Himachal Pradesh ====
Month	2021-22		2020-21		2019-20		2018-19	
Month	Collections	M-O-M Change	Collections	M-O-M Change	Collections	M-O-M Change	Collections	M-O-M Change
April	NA		NA		NA		NA	
May	NA		NA		NA		NA	
June	NA		₹619 crore (US$65 million)		₹697 crore (US$73 million)	Steady	NA	
July			₹605 crore (US$63 million)	▼	₹677 crore (US$71 million)	▼	NA	
August			₹597 crore (US$63 million)	▼	₹676 crore (US$71 million)	▼	NA	
September			₹653 crore (US$68 million)	▲	₹609 crore (US$64 million)	▼	NA	
October			₹691 crore (US$72 million)	▲	₹669 crore (US$70 million)	▲	NA	
November			₹758 crore (US$79 million)	▲	₹701 crore (US$73 million)	▲	NA	
December			₹670 crore (US$70 million)	▼	₹699 crore (US$73 million)	▼	₹595 crore (US$62 million)	Steady
January			NA		₹675 crore (US$71 million)	▼	₹647 crore (US$68 million)	▲
February			₹663.12 crore (US$69 million)		₹621 crore (US$65 million)	▼	₹610 crore (US$64 million)	▼
March			₹686.88 crore (US$72 million)	▲	₹596 crore (US$62 million)	▼	₹660 crore (US$69 million)	▲

==== Jharkhand ====
Month	2021-22		2020-21		2019-20		2018-19	
Month	Collections	M-O-M Change	Collections	M-O-M Change	Collections	M-O-M Change	Collections	M-O-M Change
April	NA		NA		NA		NA	
May	NA		NA		NA		NA	
June	NA		₹1,643 crore (US$170 million)		₹1,811 crore (US$190 million)	Steady	NA	
July			₹1,340 crore (US$140 million)	▼	₹1,855 crore (US$190 million)	▲	NA	
August			₹1,498 crore (US$160 million)	▲	₹1,770 crore (US$190 million)	▼	NA	
September			₹1,656 crore (US$170 million)	▲	₹1,509 crore (US$160 million)	▼	NA	
October			₹1,771 crore (US$190 million)	▲	₹1,437 crore (US$150 million)	▼	NA	
November			₹1,907 crore (US$200 million)	▲	₹1,720 crore (US$180 million)	▲	NA	
December			₹2,150 crore (US$230 million)	▲	₹1,943 crore (US$200 million)	▲	₹1,995 crore (US$210 million)	Steady
January			NA		₹2,027 crore (US$210 million)	▲	₹1,965 crore (US$210 million)	▼
February			₹2,321.03 crore (US$240 million)		₹2,071 crore (US$220 million)	▲	₹2,121 crore (US$220 million)	▲
March			₹2,416.13 crore (US$250 million)	▲	₹2,049 crore (US$210 million)	▼	₹2,149 crore (US$230 million)	▲

==== Karnataka ====
Month	2021-22		2020-21		2019-20		2018-19	
Month	Collections	M-O-M Change	Collections	M-O-M Change	Collections	M-O-M Change	Collections	M-O-M Change
April	NA		NA		NA		NA	
May	NA		NA		NA		NA	
June	NA		₹6,710 crore (US$700 million)		₹6,659 crore (US$700 million)	Steady	NA	
July			₹6,014 crore (US$630 million)	▼	₹7,088 crore (US$740 million)	▲	NA	
August			₹5,502 crore (US$580 million)	▼	₹6,201 crore (US$650 million)	▼	NA	
September			₹6,050 crore (US$630 million)	▲	₹6,350 crore (US$660 million)	▲	NA	
October			₹6,998 crore (US$730 million)	▲	₹6,675 crore (US$700 million)	▲	NA	
November			₹6,915 crore (US$720 million)	▼	₹6,972 crore (US$730 million)	▲	NA	
December			₹7,459 crore (US$780 million)	▲	₹6,886 crore (US$720 million)	▼	₹6,209 crore (US$650 million)	Steady
January			NA		₹7,605 crore (US$800 million)	▲	₹7,329 crore (US$770 million)	▲
February			₹7,581.45 crore (US$790 million)		₹7,414 crore (US$780 million)	▼	₹6,453 crore (US$680 million)	▼
March			₹7,914.98 crore (US$830 million)	▲	₹7,144 crore (US$750 million)	▼	₹6,983 crore (US$730 million)	▲

==== Kerala ====
Month	2021-22		2020-21		2019-20		2018-19	
Month	Collections	M-O-M Change	Collections	M-O-M Change	Collections	M-O-M Change	Collections	M-O-M Change
April	NA		NA		NA		NA	
May	NA		NA		NA		NA	
June	NA		₹1,530 crore (US$160 million)		₹1,568 crore (US$160 million)	Steady	NA	
July			₹1,318 crore (US$140 million)	▼	₹1,512 crore (US$160 million)	▼	NA	
August			₹1,229 crore (US$130 million)	▼	₹1,582 crore (US$170 million)	▲	NA	
September			₹1,552 crore (US$160 million)	▲	₹1,393 crore (US$150 million)	▼	NA	
October			₹1,665 crore (US$170 million)	▲	₹1,549 crore (US$160 million)	▲	NA	
November			₹1,568 crore (US$160 million)	▼	₹1,691 crore (US$180 million)	▲	NA	
December			₹1,776 crore (US$190 million)	▲	₹1,651 crore (US$170 million)	▼	₹1,416 crore (US$150 million)	Steady
January			NA		₹1,859 crore (US$190 million)	▲	₹1,594 crore (US$170 million)	▲
February			₹1,806.10 crore (US$190 million)		₹1,754 crore (US$180 million)	▼	₹1,416 crore (US$150 million)	▼
March			₹1,827.94 crore (US$190 million)	▲	₹1,475 crore (US$150 million)	▼	₹1,635 crore (US$170 million)	▲

==== Madhya Pradesh ====
Month	2021-22		2020-21		2019-20		2018-19	
Month	Collections	M-O-M Change	Collections	M-O-M Change	Collections	M-O-M Change	Collections	M-O-M Change
April	NA		NA		NA		NA	
May	NA		NA		NA		NA	
June	NA		₹2,742 crore (US$290 million)		₹2,212 crore (US$230 million)	Steady	NA	
July			₹2,289 crore (US$240 million)	▼	₹2,282 crore (US$240 million)	▲	NA	
August			₹2,209 crore (US$230 million)	▼	₹2,255 crore (US$240 million)	▼	NA	
September			₹2,176 crore (US$230 million)	▼	₹2,087 crore (US$220 million)	▼	NA	
October			₹2,403 crore (US$250 million)	▲	₹2,053 crore (US$210 million)	▼	NA	
November			₹2,493 crore (US$260 million)	▲	₹2,453 crore (US$260 million)	▲	NA	
December			₹2,615 crore (US$270 million)	▲	₹2,434 crore (US$250 million)	▼	₹2,094 crore (US$220 million)	Steady
January			NA		₹2,674 crore (US$280 million)	▲	₹2,414 crore (US$250 million)	▲
February			₹2,791.57 crore (US$290 million)		₹2,621 crore (US$270 million)	▼	₹2,291 crore (US$240 million)	▼
March			₹2,728.49 crore (US$290 million)	▼	₹2,407 crore (US$250 million)	▼	₹2,624 crore (US$270 million)	▲

==== Maharashtra ====
Month	2021-22		2a20-21		2019-20		2018-19	
Month	Collections	M-O-M Change	Collections	M-O-M Change	Collections	M-O-M Change	Collections	M-O-M Change
April	NA		NA		NA		NA	
May	NA		NA		NA		NA	
June	NA		₹14,987 crore (US$1.6 billion)		₹15,143 crore (US$1.6 billion)	Steady	NA	
July			₹12,508 crore (US$1.3 billion)	▼	₹15,102 crore (US$1.6 billion)	▼	NA	
August			₹11,602 crore (US$1.2 billion)	▼	₹13,407 crore (US$1.4 billion)	▼	NA	
September			₹13,546 crore (US$1.4 billion)	▲	₹13,579 crore (US$1.4 billion)	▲	NA	
October			₹15,799 crore (US$1.7 billion)	▲	₹15,109 crore (US$1.6 billion)	▲	NA	
November			₹15,001 crore (US$1.6 billion)	▼	₹15,968 crore (US$1.7 billion)	▲	NA	
December			₹17,699 crore (US$1.9 billion)	▲	₹16,530 crore (US$1.7 billion)	▲	₹13,524 crore (US$1.4 billion)	Steady
January			NA		₹18,085 crore (US$1.9 billion)	▲	₹15,151 crore (US$1.6 billion)	▲
February			₹16,103.50 crore (US$1.7 billion)		₹15,735 crore (US$1.6 billion)	▼	₹14,092 crore (US$1.5 billion)	▼
March			₹17,038.49 crore (US$1.8 billion)	▲	₹15,002 crore (US$1.6 billion)	▼	₹15,596 crore (US$1.6 billion)	▲

==== Manipur ====
Month	2021-22		2020-21		2019-20		2018-19	
Month	Collections	M-O-M Change	Collections	M-O-M Change	Collections	M-O-M Change	Collections	M-O-M Change
April	NA		NA		NA		NA	
May	NA		NA		NA		NA	
June	NA		₹29 crore (US$3.0 million)		₹25 crore (US$2.6 million)	Steady	NA	
July			₹25 crore (US$2.6 million)	▼	₹34 crore (US$3.6 million)	▲	NA	
August			₹26 crore (US$2.7 million)	▲	₹37 crore (US$3.9 million)	▲	NA	
September			₹34 crore (US$3.6 million)	▲	₹42 crore (US$4.4 million)	▲	NA	
October			₹43 crore (US$4.5 million)	▲	₹43 crore (US$4.5 million)	▲	NA	
November			₹32 crore (US$3.4 million)	▼	₹35 crore (US$3.7 million)	▼	NA	
December			₹41 crore (US$4.3 million)	▲	₹44 crore (US$4.6 million)	▲	₹27 crore (US$2.8 million)	Steady
January			NA		₹35 crore (US$3.7 million)	▼	₹24 crore (US$2.5 million)	▼
February			₹32.34 crore (US$3.4 million)		₹37 crore (US$3.9 million)	▲	₹21 crore (US$2.2 million)	▼
March			₹50.36 crore (US$5.3 million)	▲	₹36 crore (US$3.8 million)	▼	₹46 crore (US$4.8 million)	▲

==== Meghalaya ====
Month	2021-22		2020-21		2019-20		2018-19	
Month	Collections	M-O-M Change	Collections	M-O-M Change	Collections	M-O-M Change	Collections	M-O-M Change
April	NA		NA		NA		NA	
May	NA		NA		NA		NA	
June	NA		₹116 crore (US$12 million)		₹124 crore (US$13 million)	Steady	NA	
July			₹120 crore (US$13 million)	▲	₹104 crore (US$11 million)	▼	NA	
August			₹108 crore (US$11 million)	▼	₹117 crore (US$12 million)	▲	NA	
September			₹100 crore (US$10 million)	▼	₹106 crore (US$11 million)	▼	NA	
October			₹117 crore (US$12 million)	▲	₹113 crore (US$12 million)	▲	NA	
November			₹120 crore (US$13 million)	▲	₹117 crore (US$12 million)	▲	NA	
December			₹106 crore (US$11 million)	▼	₹123 crore (US$13 million)	▲	₹108 crore (US$11 million)	Steady
January			NA		₹128 crore (US$13 million)	▲	₹104 crore (US$11 million)	▼
February			₹146.50 crore (US$15 million)		₹157 crore (US$16 million)	▲	₹129 crore (US$14 million)	▲
March			₹151.97 crore (US$16 million)	▲	₹133 crore (US$14 million)	▼	₹127 crore (US$13 million)	▼

==== Mizoram ====
Month	2021-22		2020-21		2019-20		2018-19	
Month	Collections	M-O-M Change	Collections	M-O-M Change	Collections	M-O-M Change	Collections	M-O-M Change
April	NA		NA		NA		NA	
May	NA		NA		NA		NA	
June	NA		₹24 crore (US$2.5 million)		₹24 crore (US$2.5 million)	Steady	NA	
July			₹16 crore (US$1.7 million)	▼	₹19 crore (US$2.0 million)	▼	NA	
August			₹12 crore (US$1.3 million)	▼	₹28 crore (US$2.9 million)	▲	NA	
September			₹17 crore (US$1.8 million)	▲	₹29 crore (US$3.0 million)	▲	NA	
October			₹32 crore (US$3.4 million)	▲	₹18 crore (US$1.9 million)	▼	NA	
November			₹17 crore (US$1.8 million)	▼	₹17 crore (US$1.8 million)	▼	NA	
December			₹25 crore (US$2.6 million)	▲	₹21 crore (US$2.2 million)	▲	₹13 crore (US$1.4 million)	Steady
January			NA		₹24 crore (US$2.5 million)	▲	₹26 crore (US$2.7 million)	▲
February			₹21.06 crore (US$2.2 million)		₹25 crore (US$2.6 million)	▲	₹22 crore (US$2.3 million)	▼
March			₹34.93 crore (US$3.7 million)	▲	₹33 crore (US$3.5 million)	▲	₹50 crore (US$5.2 million)	▲

==== Nagaland ====
Month	2021-22		2020-21		2019-20		2018-19	
Month	Collections	M-O-M Change	Collections	M-O-M Change	Collections	M-O-M Change	Collections	M-O-M Change
April	NA		NA		NA		NA	
May	NA		NA		NA		NA	
June			₹32 crore (US$3.4 million)		₹20 crore (US$2.1 million)	Steady	NA	
July	NA		₹25 crore (US$2.6 million)	▼	₹23 crore (US$2.4 million)	▲	NA	
August			₹31 crore (US$3.2 million)	▲	₹27 crore (US$2.8 million)	▲	NA	
September			₹29 crore (US$3.0 million)	▼	₹21 crore (US$2.2 million)	▼	NA	
October			₹30 crore (US$3.1 million)	▲	₹25 crore (US$2.6 million)	▲	NA	
November			₹30 crore (US$3.1 million)	Steady	₹23 crore (US$2.4 million)	▼	NA	
December			₹38 crore (US$4.0 million)	▲	₹31 crore (US$3.2 million)	▲	₹17 crore (US$1.8 million)	Steady
January			NA		₹32 crore (US$3.4 million)	▲	₹17 crore (US$1.8 million)	Steady
February			₹34.83 crore (US$3.6 million)		₹25 crore (US$2.6 million)	▼	₹20 crore (US$2.1 million)	▲
March			₹45.48 crore (US$4.8 million)	▲	₹39 crore (US$4.1 million)	▲	₹46 crore (US$4.8 million)	▲

==== Odisha ====
Month	2021-22		2020-21		2019-20		2018-19	
Month	Collections	M-O-M Change	Collections	M-O-M Change	Collections	M-O-M Change	Collections	M-O-M Change
April	NA		NA		NA		NA	
May	NA		NA		NA		NA	
June	NA		₹2,694 crore (US$280 million)		₹2,923 crore (US$310 million)	Steady	NA	
July			₹2,348 crore (US$250 million)	▼	₹2,494 crore (US$260 million)	▼	NA	
August			₹2,348 crore (US$250 million)	Steady	₹2,497 crore (US$260 million)	▲	NA	
September			₹2,384 crore (US$250 million)	Steady	₹2,015 crore (US$210 million)	▼	NA	
October			₹2,419 crore (US$250 million)	▲	₹1,994 crore (US$210 million)	▼	NA	
November			₹2,528 crore (US$260 million)	▲	₹2,347 crore (US$250 million)	▲	NA	
December			₹2,860 crore (US$300 million)	▲	₹2,383 crore (US$250 million)	▲	₹2,347 crore (US$250 million)	Steady
January			NA		₹2,504 crore (US$260 million)	▲	₹2,338 crore (US$240 million)	▼
February			₹3,340.57 crore (US$350 million)		₹2,790.16 crore (US$290 million)	▲	₹2,374 crore (US$250 million)	▲
March			₹3,285.29 crore (US$340 million)	▼	₹2,633 crore (US$280 million)	▼	₹2,626 crore (US$270 million)	▲

==== Punjab ====
Month	2021-22		2020-21		2019-20		2018-19	
Month	Collections	M-O-M Change	Collections	M-O-M Change	Collections	M-O-M Change	Collections	M-O-M Change
April	NA		NA		NA		NA	
May	NA		NA		NA		NA	
June	NA		₹1,323 crore (US$140 million)		₹1,248 crore (US$130 million)	Steady	NA	
July			₹1,188 crore (US$120 million)	▼	₹1,271 crore (US$130 million)	▲	NA	
August			₹1,139 crore (US$120 million)	▼	₹1,255 crore (US$130 million)	▼	NA	
September			₹1,194 crore (US$130 million)	▲	₹1,133 crore (US$120 million)	▼	NA	
October			₹1,376 crore (US$140 million)	▲	₹1,189 crore (US$120 million)	▲	NA	
November			₹1,396 crore (US$150 million)	▲	₹1,375 crore (US$140 million)	▲	NA	
December			₹1,353 crore (US$140 million)	▼	₹1,290 crore (US$140 million)	▼	₹1,162 crore (US$120 million)	Steady
January			NA		₹1,340 crore (US$140 million)	▲	₹1,216 crore (US$130 million)	▲
February			₹1,299.37 crore (US$140 million)		₹1,229 crore (US$130 million)	▼	₹1,100 crore (US$120 million)	▼
March			₹1,361.85 crore (US$140 million)	▲	₹1,181 crore (US$120 million)	▼	₹1,166 crore (US$120 million)	▲

==== Rajasthan ====
Month	2021-22		2020-21		2019-20		2018-19	
Month	Collections	M-O-M Change	Collections	M-O-M Change	Collections	M-O-M Change	Collections	M-O-M Change
April	NA		NA		NA		NA	
May	NA		NA		NA		NA	
June	NA		₹2,774 crore (US$290 million)		₹2,683 crore (US$280 million)	Steady	NA	
July			₹2,797 crore (US$290 million)	▲	₹2,699 crore (US$280 million)	▲	NA	
August			₹2,582 crore (US$270 million)	▼	₹2,550 crore (US$270 million)	▼	NA	
September			₹2,647 crore (US$280 million)	▲	₹2,253 crore (US$240 million)	▲	NA	
October			₹2,966 crore (US$310 million)	▲	₹2,425 crore (US$250 million)	▲	NA	
November			₹3,130 crore (US$330 million)	▲	₹3,071 crore (US$320 million)	▲	NA	
December			₹3,135 crore (US$330 million)	▲	₹2,713 crore (US$280 million)	▼	₹2,456 crore (US$260 million)	Steady
January			NA		₹3,030 crore (US$320 million)	▲	₹2,776 crore (US$290 million)	▲
February			₹3,223.70 crore (US$340 million)		₹2,932 crore (US$310 million)	▼	₹2,676 crore (US$280 million)	▼
March			₹3,351.79 crore (US$350 million)	▲	₹2,820 crore (US$300 million)	▼	₹3,132 crore (US$330 million)	▲

==== Sikkim ====
Month	2021-22		2020-21		2019-20		2018-19	
Month	Collections	M-O-M Change	Collections	M-O-M Change	Collections	M-O-M Change	Collections	M-O-M Change
April	NA		NA		NA		NA	
May	NA		NA		NA		NA	
June	NA		₹346 crore (US$36 million)		₹193 crore (US$20 million)	Steady	NA	
July			₹186 crore (US$19 million)	▼	₹201 crore (US$21 million)	▲	NA	
August			₹147 crore (US$15 million)	▼	₹163 crore (US$17 million)	▼	NA	
September			₹106 crore (US$11 million)	▼	₹209 crore (US$22 million)	▲	NA	
October			₹177 crore (US$19 million)	▲	₹186 crore (US$19 million)	▼	NA	
November			₹223 crore (US$23 million)	▲	₹157 crore (US$16 million)	▼	NA	
December			₹225 crore (US$24 million)	▲	₹214 crore (US$22 million)	▲	₹150 crore (US$16 million)	Steady
January			NA		₹194 crore (US$20 million)	▼	₹176 crore (US$18 million)	▲
February			₹222.35 crore (US$23 million)		₹183 crore (US$19 million)	▼	₹145 crore (US$15 million)	▼
March			₹213.66 crore (US$22 million)	▼	₹189 crore (US$20 million)	▲	₹160 crore (US$17 million)	▲

==== Tamil Nadu ====
Month	2021-22		2020-21		2019-20		2018-19	
Month	Collections	M-O-M Change	Collections	M-O-M Change	Collections	M-O-M Change	Collections	M-O-M Change
April	NA		NA		NA		NA	
May	NA		NA		NA		NA	
June	NA		₹4,976 crore (US$520 million)		₹5,881 crore (US$620 million)	Steady	NA	
July			₹4,635 crore (US$490 million)	▼	₹6,084 crore (US$640 million)	▲	NA	
August			₹5,243 crore (US$550 million)	▲	₹5,973 crore (US$630 million)	▼	NA	
September			₹6,454 crore (US$680 million)	▲	₹5,616 crore (US$590 million)	▼	NA	
October			₹6,901 crore (US$720 million)	▲	₹6,109 crore (US$640 million)	▲	NA	
November			₹7,084 crore (US$740 million)	▲	₹6,449 crore (US$680 million)	▲	NA	
December			₹6,905 crore (US$720 million)	▼	₹6,422 crore (US$670 million)	▼	₹5,415 crore (US$570 million)	Steady
January			NA		₹6,703 crore (US$700 million)	▲	₹6,201 crore (US$650 million)	▲
February			₹7,008.21 crore (US$730 million)		₹6,427 crore (US$670 million)	▼	₹5,974 crore (US$630 million)	▼
March			₹7,579.18 crore (US$790 million)	▲	₹6,178 crore (US$650 million)	▼	₹6,941 crore (US$730 million)	▲

==== Telangana ====
Month	2021-22		2020-21		2019-20		2018-19	
Month	Collections	M-O-M Change	Collections	M-O-M Change	Collections	M-O-M Change	Collections	M-O-M Change
April	NA		NA		NA		NA	
May	NA		NA		NA		NA	
June	NA		₹3,276 crore (US$340 million)		₹3,166 crore (US$330 million)		NA	
July	₹3,610 crore (US$380 million)	▲	₹2,876 crore (US$300 million)	▼	₹3,163 crore (US$330 million)	▼	NA	
August	₹3,526 crore (US$370 million)	▲	₹2,793 crore (US$290 million)	▼	₹3,059 crore (US$320 million)	▼	NA	
September	₹3,494 crore (US$370 million)	▲	₹2,796 crore (US$290 million)	▲	₹2,854 crore (US$300 million)	▼	NA	
October	₹3,854 crore (US$400 million)	▼	₹3,383 crore (US$350 million)	▲	₹3,230 crore (US$340 million)	▲	NA	
November	₹3,931 crore (US$410 million)	▲	₹3,175 crore (US$330 million)	▼	₹3,349 crore (US$350 million)	▲	NA	
December	₹3,760 crore (US$390 million)	▲	₹3,543 crore (US$370 million)	▲	₹3,420 crore (US$360 million)	▲	₹3,014 crore (US$320 million)	Steady
January	NA		NA		₹3,787 crore (US$400 million)	▲	₹3,195 crore (US$330 million)	▲
February	₹4,113 crore (US$430 million)	▲	₹3,636.44 crore (US$380 million)	▼	₹3,667 crore (US$380 million)	▼	₹3,460 crore (US$360 million)	▲
March	₹4,242 crore (US$440 million)	▲	₹4,166.42 crore (US$440 million)	▲	₹3,563 crore (US$370 million)	▼	₹3,897 crore (US$410 million)	▲
Monthly Average	₹3,816.25 crore (US$400 million)	▲	₹3,293.87 crore (US$340 million)	▼	₹3,325.8 crore (US$350 million)	▼	₹3,391.5 crore (US$360 million)	

==== Tripura ====
Month	2021-22		2020-21		2019-20		2018-19	
Month	Collections	M-O-M Change	Collections	M-O-M Change	Collections	M-O-M Change	Collections	M-O-M Change
April	NA		NA		NA		NA	
May	NA		NA		NA		NA	
June	NA		₹65 crore (US$6.8 million)		₹58 crore (US$6.1 million)	Steady	NA	
July			₹48 crore (US$5.0 million)	▼	₹49 crore (US$5.1 million)	▼	NA	
August			₹43 crore (US$4.5 million)	▼	₹58 crore (US$6.1 million)	▲	NA	
September			₹50 crore (US$5.2 million)	▲	₹52 crore (US$5.4 million)	▼	NA	
October			₹57 crore (US$6.0 million)	▲	₹54 crore (US$5.7 million)	▲	NA	
November			₹58 crore (US$6.1 million)	▲	₹51 crore (US$5.3 million)	▼	NA	
December			₹74 crore (US$7.7 million)	▲	₹59 crore (US$6.2 million)	▲	₹48 crore (US$5.0 million)	Steady
January			NA		₹56 crore (US$5.9 million)	▼	₹52 crore (US$5.4 million)	▲
February			₹63.25 crore (US$6.6 million)		₹63 crore (US$6.6 million)	▲	₹46 crore (US$4.8 million)	▼
March			₹87.90 crore (US$9.2 million)	▲	₹67 crore (US$7.0 million)	▲	₹64 crore (US$6.7 million)	▲

==== Uttar Pradesh ====
Month	2021-22		2020-21		2019-20		2018-19	
Month	Collections	M-O-M Change	Collections	M-O-M Change	Collections	M-O-M Change	Collections	M-O-M Change
April	NA		NA		NA		NA	
May	NA		NA		NA		NA	
June	NA		₹5,194 crore (US$540 million)		₹5,366 crore (US$560 million)	Steady	NA	
July			₹5,099 crore (US$530 million)	▼	₹5,422 crore (US$570 million)	▲	NA	
August			₹5,098 crore (US$530 million)	▼	₹4,975 crore (US$520 million)	▼	NA	
September			₹5,075 crore (US$530 million)	▼	₹5,073 crore (US$530 million)	▲	NA	
October			₹5,471 crore (US$570 million)	▲	₹5,103 crore (US$530 million)	▲	NA	
November			₹5,528 crore (US$580 million)	▲	₹5,679 crore (US$590 million)	▲	NA	
December			₹5,937 crore (US$620 million)	▲	₹5,489 crore (US$570 million)	▼	₹4,957 crore (US$520 million)	Steady
January			NA		₹5,698 crore (US$600 million)	▲	₹5,485 crore (US$570 million)	▲
February			₹5,996.62 crore (US$630 million)		₹5,776 crore (US$600 million)	▲	₹5,112 crore (US$540 million)	▼
March			₹6,265.01 crore (US$660 million)	▲	₹5,294 crore (US$550 million)	▼	₹5,548 crore (US$580 million)	▲

==== Uttarakhand ====
Month	2021-22		2020-21		2019-20		2018-19	
Month	Collections	M-O-M Change	Collections	M-O-M Change	Collections	M-O-M Change	Collections	M-O-M Change
April	NA		NA		NA		NA	
May	NA		NA		NA		NA	
June	NA		₹895 crore (US$94 million)		₹1,232 crore (US$130 million)	Steady	NA	
July			₹988 crore (US$100 million)	▲	₹1,289 crore (US$130 million)	▲	NA	
August			₹1,006 crore (US$110 million)	▲	₹941 crore (US$99 million)	▼	NA	
September			₹1,065 crore (US$110 million)	▲	₹1,017 crore (US$110 million)	▲	NA	
October			₹1,272 crore (US$130 million)	▲	₹1,153 crore (US$120 million)	▲	NA	
November			₹1,286 crore (US$130 million)	▲	₹1,280 crore (US$130 million)	▲	NA	
December			₹1,246 crore (US$130 million)	▼	₹1,213 crore (US$130 million)	▼	₹1,055 crore (US$110 million)	Steady
January			NA		₹1,257 crore (US$130 million)	▲	₹1,146 crore (US$120 million)	▲
February			₹1,181.13 crore (US$120 million)		₹1,281 crore (US$130 million)	▲	₹1,237 crore (US$130 million)	▲
March			₹1,303.57 crore (US$140 million)	▲	₹1,195 crore (US$130 million)	▼	₹1,451 crore (US$150 million)	▲

==== West Bengal ====
Month	2021-22		2020-21		2019-20		2018-19	
Month	Collections	M-O-M Change	Collections	M-O-M Change	Collections	M-O-M Change	Collections	M-O-M Change
April	NA		NA		NA		NA	
May	NA		NA		NA		NA	
June	NA		₹3,128 crore (US$330 million)		₹3,514 crore (US$370 million)	Steady	NA	
July			₹3,010 crore (US$320 million)	▼	₹3,586 crore (US$380 million)	▲	NA	
August			₹3,053 crore (US$320 million)	▲	₹3,503 crore (US$370 million)	▼	NA	
September			₹3,393 crore (US$360 million)	▲	₹3,255 crore (US$340 million)	▼	NA	
October			₹3,738 crore (US$390 million)	▲	₹3,263 crore (US$340 million)	▲	NA	
November			₹3,747 crore (US$390 million)	▲	₹3,460 crore (US$360 million)	▲	NA	
December			₹4,114 crore (US$430 million)	▲	₹3,748 crore (US$390 million)	▲	₹3,230 crore (US$340 million)	Steady
January			NA		₹3,747 crore (US$390 million)	▲	₹3,495 crore (US$370 million)	▲
February			₹4,334.98 crore (US$450 million)		₹3,942 crore (US$410 million)	▲	₹3,490 crore (US$370 million)	▼
March			₹4,386.79 crore (US$460 million)	▲	₹3,582 crore (US$380 million)	▼	₹3,841 crore (US$400 million)	▲

=== Union Territories ===
Note: Below tables does not include GST on import of goods

==== Andaman and Nicobar Islands ====
Month	2021-22		2020-21		2019-20		2018-19	
Month	Collections	M-O-M Change	Collections	M-O-M Change	Collections	M-O-M Change	Collections	M-O-M Change
April	NA		NA		NA		NA	
May	NA		NA		NA		NA	
June	NA		₹54 crore (US$5.7 million)		₹21 crore (US$2.2 million)	Steady	NA	
July			₹18 crore (US$1.9 million)	▼	₹22 crore (US$2.3 million)	▲	NA	
August			₹13 crore (US$1.4 million)	▼	₹30 crore (US$3.1 million)	▲	NA	
September			₹19 crore (US$2.0 million)	▲	₹19 crore (US$2.0 million)	▼	NA	
October			₹19 crore (US$2.0 million)	Steady	₹32 crore (US$3.4 million)	▲	NA	
November			₹23 crore (US$2.4 million)	▲	₹25 crore (US$2.6 million)	▼	NA	
December			₹22 crore (US$2.3 million)	▼	₹30 crore (US$3.1 million)	▲	₹22 crore (US$2.3 million)	Steady
January			NA		₹30 crore (US$3.1 million)	Steady	₹35 crore (US$3.7 million)	▲
February			₹23.26 crore (US$2.4 million)		₹36 crore (US$3.8 million)	▲	₹25 crore (US$2.6 million)	▼
March			₹25.66 crore (US$2.7 million)	▲	₹39 crore (US$4.1 million)	▲	₹28 crore (US$2.9 million)	▲

==== Chandigarh ====
Month	2021-22		2020-21		2019-20		2018-19	
Month	Collections	M-O-M Change	Collections	M-O-M Change	Collections	M-O-M Change	Collections	M-O-M Change
April	NA		NA		NA		NA	
May	NA		NA		NA		NA	
June	NA		₹159 crore (US$17 million)		₹158 crore (US$17 million)	Steady	NA	
July			₹137 crore (US$14 million)	▼	₹156 crore (US$16 million)	▼	NA	
August			₹139 crore (US$15 million)	▲	₹160 crore (US$17 million)	▲	NA	
September			₹141 crore (US$15 million)	▲	₹157 crore (US$16 million)	▼	NA	
October			₹152 crore (US$16 million)	▲	₹157 crore (US$16 million)	Steady	NA	
November			₹141 crore (US$15 million)	▼	₹165 crore (US$17 million)	▲	NA	
December			₹158 crore (US$17 million)	▲	₹168 crore (US$18 million)	▲	₹143 crore (US$15 million)	Steady
January			NA		₹195 crore (US$20 million)	▲	₹159 crore (US$17 million)	▲
February			₹148.50 crore (US$16 million)		₹172 crore (US$18 million)	▼	₹147 crore (US$15 million)	▼
March			₹165.27 crore (US$17 million)	▲	₹153 crore (US$16 million)	▼	₹162 crore (US$17 million)	▲

==== Dadra and Nagar Haveli and Daman and Diu ====
Month	2021-22		2020-21		2019-20		2018-19	
Month	Collections	M-O-M Change	Collections	M-O-M Change	Collections	M-O-M Change	Collections	M-O-M Change
April	NA		NA		NA		NA	
May	NA		NA		NA		NA	
June	NA		₹192 crore (US$20 million)		₹252 crore (US$26 million)	Steady	NA	
July			₹207 crore (US$22 million)	▲	₹240 crore (US$25 million)	▼	NA	
August			₹215 crore (US$23 million)	▲	₹262 crore (US$27 million)	▲	NA	
September			₹240 crore (US$25 million)	▲	₹214 crore (US$22 million)	▼	NA	
October			₹290 crore (US$30 million)	▲	₹213 crore (US$22 million)	▼	NA	
November			₹298 crore (US$31 million)	▲	₹246 crore (US$26 million)	▲	NA	
December			₹263 crore (US$28 million)	▼	₹248 crore (US$26 million)	▲	₹206 crore (US$22 million)	Steady
January			NA		₹282 crore (US$30 million)	▲	₹274 crore (US$29 million)	▲
February			₹237.70 crore (US$25 million)		₹239 crore (US$25 million)	▼	₹231 crore (US$24 million)	▼
March			₹291.78 crore (US$31 million)	▲	₹264 crore (US$28 million)	▲	₹277 crore (US$29 million)	▲

==== Jammu and Kashmir ====
Month	2021-22		2020-21		2019-20		2018-19	
Month	Collections	M-O-M Change	Collections	M-O-M Change	Collections	M-O-M Change	Collections	M-O-M Change
April	NA		NA		NA		NA	
May	NA		NA		NA		NA	
June	NA		₹325 crore (US$34 million)		₹322 crore (US$34 million)	Steady	NA	
July			₹298 crore (US$31 million)	▼	₹363 crore (US$38 million)	▲	NA	
August			₹326 crore (US$34 million)	▲	₹302 crore (US$32 million)	▼	NA	
September			₹368 crore (US$39 million)	▲	₹282 crore (US$30 million)	▼	NA	
October			₹377 crore (US$39 million)	▲	₹313 crore (US$33 million)	▲	NA	
November			₹360 crore (US$38 million)	▼	₹363 crore (US$38 million)	▲	NA	
December			₹318 crore (US$33 million)	▼	₹409 crore (US$43 million)	▲	₹293 crore (US$31 million)	Steady
January			NA		₹371 crore (US$39 million)	▼	₹331 crore (US$35 million)	▲
February			₹329.89 crore (US$35 million)		₹316 crore (US$33 million)	▼	₹306 crore (US$32 million)	▼
March			₹351.61 crore (US$37 million)	▲	₹276 crore (US$29 million)	▼	₹388 crore (US$41 million)	▲

==== Ladakh ====
Month	2021-22		2020-21		2019-20		2018-19	
Month	Collections	M-O-M Change	Collections	M-O-M Change	Collections	M-O-M Change	Collections	M-O-M Change
April	NA		NA		NA		NA	
May	NA		NA		NA		NA	
June	NA		₹7 crore (US$730,000)	Steady	₹0 crore (US$0.00)	Steady	NA	
July			₹7 crore (US$730,000)	Steady	₹0 crore (US$0.00)	Steady	NA	
August			₹5 crore (US$520,000)	▼	₹0 crore (US$0.00)	Steady	NA	
September			₹9 crore (US$940,000)	▲	₹0 crore (US$0.00)	Steady	NA	
October			₹15 crore (US$1.6 million)	▲	₹0 crore (US$0.00)	Steady	NA	
November			₹9 crore (US$940,000)	▼	-	Steady	NA	
December			₹8 crore (US$840,000)	▼	₹0 crore (US$0.00)	Steady	NA	
January			NA		NA		NA	
February			₹9.06 crore (US$950,000)		₹0 crore (US$0.00)	Steady	NA	
March			₹13.67 crore (US$1.4 million)	▲	₹0.84 crore (US$88,000)	Steady	NA	

==== Lakshadweep ====
Month	2021-22		2020-21		2019-20		2018-19	
Month	Collections	M-O-M Change	Collections	M-O-M Change	Collections	M-O-M Change	Collections	M-O-M Change
April	NA		NA		NA		NA	
May	NA		NA		NA		NA	
June	NA		₹1 crore (US$100,000)		₹1 crore (US$100,000)	Steady	NA	
July			₹2 crore (US$210,000)	▲	₹2 crore (US$210,000)	▲	NA	
August			₹0 crore (US$0.00)	▼	₹1 crore (US$100,000)	▼	NA	
September			₹1 crore (US$100,000)	▲	₹2 crore (US$210,000)	▲	NA	
October			₹1 crore (US$100,000)	Steady	₹2 crore (US$210,000)	Steady	NA	
November			₹0 crore (US$0.00)	▼	₹2 crore (US$210,000)	Steady	NA	
December			₹1 crore (US$100,000)	▲	₹1 crore (US$100,000)	▼	₹4 crore (US$420,000)	Steady
January			NA		₹3 crore (US$310,000)	▲	₹1 crore (US$100,000)	▼
February			₹0.46 crore (US$48,000)		₹2 crore (US$210,000)	▼	₹3 crore (US$310,000)	▲
March			₹1.54 crore (US$160,000)	▲	₹1.34 crore (US$140,000)	▼	₹1 crore (US$100,000)	▼

==== National Capital Territory of Delhi ====
Month	2021-22		2020-21		2019-20		2018-19	
Month	Collections	M-O-M Change	Collections	M-O-M Change	Collections	M-O-M Change	Collections	M-O-M Change
April	NA		NA		NA		NA	
May	NA		NA		NA		NA	
June	NA		₹3,249 crore (US$340 million)		₹3,595 crore (US$380 million)	Steady	NA	
July			₹2,629 crore (US$280 million)	▼	₹3,406 crore (US$360 million)	▼	NA	
August			₹2,880 crore (US$300 million)	▲	₹3,517 crore (US$370 million)	▲	NA	
September			₹3,146 crore (US$330 million)	▲	₹3,386 crore (US$350 million)	▼	NA	
October			₹3,211 crore (US$340 million)	▲	₹3,484 crore (US$360 million)	▲	NA	
November			₹3,413 crore (US$360 million)	▲	₹3,995 crore (US$420 million)	▲	NA	
December			₹3,451 crore (US$360 million)	▲	₹3,698 crore (US$390 million)	▼	₹3,146 crore (US$330 million)	Steady
January			NA		₹3,967 crore (US$420 million)	▲	₹3,525 crore (US$370 million)	▲
February			₹3,727.46 crore (US$390 million)		₹3,835 crore (US$400 million)	▼	₹3,422 crore (US$360 million)	▼
March			₹3,925.97 crore (US$410 million)	▲	₹3,273 crore (US$340 million)	▼	₹3,722 crore (US$390 million)	▲

==== Puducherry ====
Month	2021-22		2020-21		2019-20		2018-19	
Month	Collections	M-O-M Change	Collections	M-O-M Change	Collections	M-O-M Change	Collections	M-O-M Change
April	NA		NA		NA		NA	
May	NA		NA		NA		NA	
June	NA		₹141 crore (US$15 million)		₹135 crore (US$14 million)	Steady	NA	
July			₹136 crore (US$14 million)	▼	₹145 crore (US$15 million)	▲	NA	
August			₹137 crore (US$14 million)	▲	₹161 crore (US$17 million)	▲	NA	
September			₹148 crore (US$15 million)	▲	₹149 crore (US$16 million)	▼	NA	
October			₹161 crore (US$17 million)	▲	₹146 crore (US$15 million)	▼	NA	
November			₹158 crore (US$17 million)	▼	₹157 crore (US$16 million)	▲	NA	
December			₹159 crore (US$17 million)	▲	₹165 crore (US$17 million)	▲	₹152 crore (US$16 million)	Steady
January			NA		₹188 crore (US$20 million)	▲	₹159 crore (US$17 million)	▲
February			₹158.05 crore (US$17 million)		₹159 crore (US$17 million)	▼	₹175 crore (US$18 million)	▲
March			₹161.04 crore (US$17 million)	▲	₹149 crore (US$16 million)	▼	₹184 crore (US$19 million)	▲

=== Other Territory ===
Note: Below table does not include GST on import of goods

Month	2021-22		2020-21		2019-20		2018-19	
Month	Collections	M-O-M Change	Collections	M-O-M Change	Collections	M-O-M Change	Collections	M-O-M Change
April	NA		NA		NA		NA	
May	NA		NA		NA		NA	
June			₹173 crore (US$18 million)		₹166 crore (US$17 million)	Steady	NA	
July			₹97 crore (US$10 million)	▼	₹158 crore (US$17 million)	▼	NA	
August			₹180 crore (US$19 million)	▲	₹170 crore (US$18 million)	▲	NA	
September			₹110 crore (US$12 million)	▼	₹132 crore (US$14 million)	▼	NA	
October			₹91 crore (US$9.5 million)	▼	₹127 crore (US$13 million)	▼	NA	
November			₹79 crore (US$8.3 million)	▼	₹153 crore (US$16 million)	▲	NA	
December			₹88 crore (US$9.2 million)	▲	₹118 crore (US$12 million)	▼	NA	
January			NA		₹139 crore (US$15 million)	▲	₹194 crore (US$20 million)	Steady
February			₹134.33 crore (US$14 million)		₹145 crore (US$15 million)	▲	₹141 crore (US$15 million)	▼
March			₹132.39 crore (US$14 million)	▲	₹133 crore (US$14 million)	▼	₹167 crore (US$17 million)	▲

=== Center Jurisdiction ===
Note: Below table does not include GST on import of goods

Month	2021-22		2020-21		2019-20		2018-19	
Month	Collections	M-O-M Change	Collections	M-O-M Change	Collections	M-O-M Change	Collections	M-O-M Change
April	NA		NA		NA		NA	
May	NA		NA		NA		NA	
June			₹59 crore (US$6.2 million)		₹61 crore (US$6.4 million)	Steady	NA	
July			₹179 crore (US$19 million)	▲	₹59 crore (US$6.2 million)	▼	NA	
August			₹161 crore (US$17 million)	▼	₹100 crore (US$10 million)	▲	NA	
September			₹121 crore (US$13 million)	▼	₹35 crore (US$3.7 million)	▼	NA	
October			₹114 crore (US$12 million)	▼	₹97 crore (US$10 million)	▲	NA	
November			₹138 crore (US$14 million)	▲	₹95 crore (US$9.9 million)	▼	NA	
December			₹127 crore (US$13 million)	▼	₹75 crore (US$7.9 million)	▼	NA	
January			NA		₹119 crore (US$12 million)	▲	₹45 crore (US$4.7 million)	Steady
February			₹129.03 crore (US$14 million)		₹100 crore (US$10 million)	▼	₹47 crore (US$4.9 million)	▲
March			₹141.12 crore (US$15 million)	▲	₹81 crore (US$8.5 million)	▼	₹74 crore (US$7.7 million)	▲

=== Monthly GST Revenue Collections from Import ===
Month	2021-22		2020-21		2019-20		2018-19	
Month	IGST	Cess	IGST	Cess	IGST	Cess	IGST	Cess
April	₹29,599 crore (US$3.1 billion) ▼	₹981 crore (US$100 million)▲	NA	NA	₹23,289 crore (US$2.4 billion) ▼	₹1,053 crore (US$110 million) ▲	₹21,246 crore (US$2.2 billion)	₹702 crore (US$74 million)
May	₹26,002 crore (US$2.7 billion) ▼	₹868 crore (US$91 million) ▼	NA	NA	NA	NA	₹24,447 crore (US$2.6 billion) ▲	₹854 crore (US$89 million) ▲
June	₹25,762 crore (US$2.7 billion) ▼	₹809 crore (US$85 million) ▼	₹15,709 crore (US$1.6 billion)	₹607 crore (US$64 million)	NA	NA	NA	NA
July			₹20,324 crore (US$2.1 billion) ▲	₹807 crore (US$85 million) ▲	₹24,246 crore (US$2.5 billion)	₹797 crore (US$83 million)	₹24,852 crore (US$2.6 billion)	₹794 crore (US$83 million)
August			₹19,179 crore (US$2.0 billion) ▼	₹673 crore (US$70 million) ▼	₹24,818 crore (US$2.6 billion) ▲	₹841 crore (US$88 million) ▲	₹26,512 crore (US$2.8 billion) ▲	₹849 crore (US$89 million) ▲
September			₹22,442 crore (US$2.4 billion) ▲	₹788 crore (US$83 million) ▲	NA	NA	₹25,308 crore (US$2.7 billion) ▼	₹769 crore (US$81 million) ▼
October			₹23,375 crore (US$2.4 billion) ▲	₹932 crore (US$98 million) ▲	₹21,446 crore (US$2.2 billion)	₹774 crore (US$81 million)	₹26,908 crore (US$2.8 billion) ▲	₹955 crore (US$100 million) ▲
November			₹22,078 crore (US$2.3 billion) ▼	₹809 crore (US$85 million) ▼	₹20,948 crore (US$2.2 billion) ▼	₹869 crore (US$91 million) ▲	₹24,133 crore (US$2.5 billion) ▼	₹842 crore (US$88 million) ▼
December			₹27,050 crore (US$2.8 billion) ▲	₹971 crore (US$100 million) ▲	₹21,295 crore (US$2.2 billion) ▲	₹847 crore (US$89 million) ▼	₹23,635 crore (US$2.5 billion) ▼	₹838 crore (US$88 million) ▼
January			₹27,424 crore (US$2.9 billion) ▲	₹883 crore (US$92 million) ▼	₹23,481 crore (US$2.5 billion) ▲	₹824 crore (US$86 million) ▼	₹24,065 crore (US$2.5 billion) ▲	₹902 crore (US$94 million) ▲
February			₹24,382 crore (US$2.6 billion) ▼	₹660 crore (US$69 million) ▼	₹20,745 crore (US$2.2 billion) ▼	₹1,040 crore (US$110 million) ▲	NA	NA
March			₹31,097 crore (US$3.3 billion) ▲	₹935 crore (US$98 million) ▲	₹18,056 crore (US$1.9 billion) ▼	₹841 crore (US$88 million) ▼	₹23,521 crore (US$2.5 billion)	₹891 crore (US$93 million)

== Returns ==
Around 38 lakh new taxpayers have registered under GST regime and the total count has crossed one crore if we include the 64 lakh earlier ones. Total number of taxpayers were above 1.14 crore in October 2018.

=== GSTR1 Filling Data ===
Month	2022-23			2021-22			2020-21			2019-20			2018-19			2017-18		
Month	Eligibility	Returns Filed	Return Filing %	Eligibility	Returns Filed	Return Filing %	Eligibility	Returns Filed	Return Filing %	Eligibility	Returns Filed	Return Filing %	Eligibility	Returns Filed	Return Filing %	Eligibility	Returns Filed	Return Filing %
April				69,32,700	63,47,750	91.56% ▼	1,03,96,914	39,00,202	37.51% ▼	57,58,955	33,41,857	58.03% ▼	44,96,316	30,01,817	66.76% ▼	NA	NA	NA
May				69,50,738	63,61,442	91.52% ▼	96,02,035	39,13,235	40.75% ▲	55,64,504	33,48,401	60.17% ▲	46,82,345	30,38,077	64.88% ▼	NA	NA	NA
June				1,08,56,253	1,01,31,735	93.33% ▲	1,03,98,099	91,68,959	88.18% ▲	1,03,58,399	84,99,843	82.06% ▲	93,16,710	79,13,720	84.94% ▲	NA	NA	NA
July				70,18,290	64,44,678	91.83% ▼	60,12,285	39,87,341	66.32% ▼	51,33,194	33,74,821	65.75% ▼	47,75,626	30,96,422	64.84% ▼	74,61,214	61,44,558	82.35%
August				71,25,860	65,59,045	92.05% ▲	58,10,614	40,18,295	69.15% ▲	49,85,666	33,87,945	67.95% ▲	47,26,891	31,16,780	65.94% ▲	32,60,937	26,42,437	81.03% ▼
September				1,11,81,178	1,04,16,779	93.16% ▲	1,08,51,006	94,38,279	86.98% ▲	1,04,73,814	86,19,917	82.30% ▲	96,57,239	81,83,662	84.74% ▲	79,25,831	71,07,122	89.67% ▲
October				71,27,280	65,51,981	91.93% ▼	54,63,094	40,90,848	74.88% ▼	48,45,556	34,12,591	70.43% ▼	46,09,444	31,16,780	67.62% ▼	34,38,891	27,35,027	79.53% ▼
November				72,09,029	66,56,618	92.34% ▲	53,48,264	41,39,930	77.41% ▲	46,98,995	34,38,627	73.18% ▲	45,72,118	31,70,352	69.34% ▲	31,26,495	27,91,046	89.27% ▲
December				1,14,29,107	1,02,26,921	89.48% ▼	1,09,84,214	97,62,645	88.88% ▲	1,03,70,746	85,04,725	82.01% ▲	99,01,997	83,59,420	84.42% ▲	81,82,277	72,58,368	88.71% ▼
January				72,48,766	67,01,662	92.53% ▲	62,62,450	53,30,393	85.12% ▼	44,61,650	33,22,929	74.48% ▼	44,22,359	32,05,261	72.48% ▼	32,29,377	28,23,709	87.44% ▼
February				73,11,740	68,05,107	93.07% ▲	61,36,693	54,44,292	88.72% ▲	43,73,058	31,57,067	72.19% ▼	43,61,644	32,09,106	73.58% ▲	32,74,028	28,47,262	86.97% ▼
March				1,16,31,207	1,08,17,098	93.00% ▼	1,07,79,583	1,00,26,316	93.01% ▲	1,04,27,790	61,77,367	59.24% ▼	1,01,74,978	84,41,585	82.96% ▲	87,08,493	75,94,558	87.21% ▲
Annual Average				85,01,845	78,35,068	92.16%	81,70,437	60,93,394	74.53%	67,87,693	48,82,174	71.92%	63,08,138	48,21,081	76.42%	54,00,838 (Note: For 9 months only)	46,60,454 (Note: For 9 months only)	86.29% (Note: For 9 months only)

=== GSTR3B Filling Data ===
Month	2022-23			2021-22			2020-21			2019-20			2018-19			2017-18		
Month	Eligibility	Returns Filed	Return Filing %	Eligibility	Returns Filed	Return Filing %	Eligibility	Returns Filed	Return Filing %	Eligibility	Returns Filed	Return Filing %	Eligibility	Returns Filed	Return Filing %	Eligibility	Returns Filed	Return Filing %
April				69,32,700	65,41,508	94.36% ▼	1,04,14,263	95,24,183	91.45% ▲	1,02,33,313	87,92,102	85.92% ▼	88,17,798	79,74,186	90.43% ▲	NA	NA	NA
May				69,50,738	65,55,856	94.32% ▼	1,03,42,810	95,27,800	92.12% ▲	1,02,86,063	88,40,788	85.95% ▲	91,22,309	81,24,629	89.06% ▼	NA	NA	NA
June				1,08,56,253	1,04,16,056	95.95% ▲	1,03,98,099	95,91,048	92.24% ▲	1,03,58,399	88,77,831	85.71% ▼	93,16,710	82,38,612	88.43% ▼	NA	NA	NA
July				70,18,290	66,26,467	94.42% ▼	1,05,65,995	97,03,900	91.84% ▼	51,33,194	33,74,821	65.75% ▼	1,04,26,762	89,37,908	85.72% ▼	74,61,214	64,77,475	86.82%
August				71,25,860	67,56,361	94.81% ▲	1,07,04,458	98,04,910	91.60% ▼	1,04,55,891	89,80,465	85.89% ▲	96,15,273	84,53,166	87.91% ▲	75,32,807	70,88,919	94.11% ▲
September				1,11,81,178	1,07,11,252	95.80% ▲	1,08,51,006	98,90,906	91.15% ▼	1,04,73,814	90,25,033	86.17% ▲	96,57,239	85,42,673	88.46% ▲	79,25,831	74,52,948	94.03% ▼
October				71,27,280	67,34,604	94.49% ▼	1,09,71,772	99,94,400	91.09% ▼	1,04,95,064	90,66,659	86.39%% ▲	97,57,664	86,29,693	88.44% ▼	81,54,303	72,61,425	89.05% ▼
November				72,09,029	68,25,374	94.68% ▲	1,10,10,568	1,00,88,226	91.62% ▲	1,04,78,440	91,08,311	86.92% ▲	98,46,645	86,04,200	87.38% ▼	79,92,517	73,82,324	92.37% ▲
December				1,14,29,107	1,09,12,624	95.48% ▲	1,09,84,214	1,01,81,704	92.69% ▲	1,03,70,746	91,45,404	88.18% ▲	99,01,997	86,88,110	87.74% ▲	81,82,277	74,83,230	91.46% ▼
January				72,42,766	68,61,430	94.73% ▼	62,63,763	56,10,002	89.61% ▼	1,03,57,733	90,84,172	87.70% ▼	99,72,639	87,55,573	87.80% ▲	83,63,437	76,16,175	91.07% ▼
February				73,11,740	69,66,506	95.28% ▲	61,32,577	57,18,641	93.25% ▲	1,03,72,198	88,28,117	85.11% ▼	1,00,54,283	88,25,144	87.77% ▼	85,45,661	77,51,880	90.71% ▼
March				1,16,31,207	1,10,99,867	95.43% ▲	1,07,79,583	1,03,90,017	96.39% ▲	1,04,27,790	78,81,433	75.58% ▼	1,01,74,978	88,80,875	87.28% ▼	87,08,493	78,72,288	90.40% ▼
Annual Average				85,01,345	80,83,992	95.09%	99,51,592	91,68,811	92.13%	99,53,553	8417094	84.56%	97,22,024	85,54,564	87.99%	80,96,282 (Note: For 9 months only)	73,76,296 (Note: For 9 months only)	91.10% (Note: For 9 months only)

Official Source

== See also ==
- The Great Hedge of India, a historic colonial-era inland customs border
- Goods and Services Tax (India)
