= Eye care in India =

Government support and local innovation has produced rapid improvements in eye care in India. A survey in 1976 found that 1.3% of the population were blind, and this was mostly due to cataract. This motivated government action. The National Program for Control of Blindness was launched, though funding did not match that of higher priority problems such as malaria, tuberculosis, and maternal and child health. By 1986 prevalence had risen to 1.49% and the government decided to allow free imports of ophthalmic equipment and then applied to the World Bank for a loan to support the development of cataract surgery. Evidence of the economic impact of blindness helped to secure funding of $117 million for the seven-year project which was launched in 1995.

Cataract surgery targeting low-income or rural populations was formerly performed in makeshift operating rooms with outdated technology. A 2007 study published in the Indian Journal of Ophthalmology analyzed barriers that prevent people from seeking eye care in rural Andhra Pradesh, India. Where people had awareness of eyesight issues over the past five years but did not seek treatment, 52% of the respondents had personal reasons (some due to own beliefs about the minimal extent of issues with their vision), 37% economic hardship, and 21% social factors (such as other familial commitments or lacking an accompaniment to the healthcare facility).

Continued government funding for the programme was accompanied by regulations to require surgery to be done in hospitals and not in makeshift camps. The number of ophthalmologists trained has increased each year and the scope of the program has expanded beyond cataracts to other areas of eye care. The cross-subsidization model for eye care adopted by Aravind Eye Hospitals is common. Fees from the wealthier patients help cover the costs for the poor. Deployment of allied ophthalmic personnel increases volume and decreases costs, though there is no accreditation process for them.

Around half the eye care in India in 2018 is provided by non-government organisations. The equipment has reduced in price and more clinicians have been trained.
