= Value-added taxation in India =

India transitioned to a Value-added tax (VAT) system on 1 April 2005. The previous general sales tax laws were replaced with the Value Added Tax Act (2005) and associated VAT rules.

A few states (Gujarat, Tamil Nadu, Rajasthan, Madhya Pradesh, Chhattisgarh, Jharkhand, Uttarakhand and Uttar Pradesh) opted out of VAT during the initial introduction of VAT but adopted it later. As of 2 June 2014, VAT had been implemented in all the states and union territories of India except Pondicherry, Andaman and Nicobar Islands and Lakshadweep Island.

India replaced VAT with the Goods and Services Tax on 1 July 2017.

== Legacy of India's VAT ==
In an audit of the policy, the Comptroller and Auditor of India found multiple deficiencies in the implementation of VAT.

== States where VAT was applicable ==
=== Gujarat ===
The Government of Gujarat had pass the "Gujarat Value Added Tax Act, 2003" (Act) in 2003 and specified the date of implementation (appointed date) would be notified later. Accordingly, the Government of Gujarat has vide notification no. GHN – 14/VAT-2006/S.1.(3)(1)-TH dated 29 March 2006 notified that the appointed date for implementation of VAT regulations in the State of Gujarat shall be effected from 1 April 2006.

However, "The Central Sales Tax Act, 1956" (Central Act) which levies sales tax on inter-state sales was still effective and all inter state sale and purchase transactions effected after 1 April 2006 in the State of Gujarat continued to be subject to levy central sales tax as applicable earlier.

In Gujarat, "DVAT" Act 2003, will merged three existing state taxes:
Gujarat Sales Tax Act, 1956
Bombay Sales of Motor Spirit Taxation Act, 1958 Gujarat Purchase Tax on Sugarcane Act, 1989

Rates under VAT:

The Gujarat Value Added Tax Act, 2003 - Schedule

| Schedule No | Description |
|---|---|
| Schedule 1 | Goods, the sales or Purchase of which are exempt from tax |
| Schedule 2 | List of Goods Taxable at 5% and other rates as specified in the schedule |
| Schedule 3 | List of Goods Taxable at special rates |
| General Category | Goods not specified in any other schedule taxable @ 15% |
#Vat Schedule Details

=== Maharashtra ===
The system of Value Added Tax (VAT) was implemented, in the State of Maharashtra, w.e.f. 1 April 2005.

=== Delhi ===
DVAT 2004 as amended by DVAT 2005 and DVAT Rules 2005 came into force w.e.f. 1 April 2005. It repealed Delhi Sales Tax Act 1975, Delhi Sales Tax on Works Contract Act, 1999, Delhi Sales Tax on Transfer to Right to use Goods Act 2002 and Delhi Tax on Entry of Motors Vehicles into Local Areas Act 1994.

=== Jammu & Kashmir ===
Value added tax for the state Jammu & Kashmir includes multiple products such as cooked food, saffron, honey, electrical items, textile items such as durries, quilts, Pashmina wool etc. Apart from the applicability of VAT, the govt also made some exemptions on basic food items, industrial units, hotel, and farming equipment.

=== Kerala ===
The Kerala Value Added Tax Act (KVAT) 2003 was the governing act for Value Added Taxes in Kerala. Kerala Value Added Tax (Act 30 of 2004) came into force on 1 April 2005.

== See also ==
- Assam General Sales Tax
- One Hundred and First Amendment of the Constitution of India
- Taxation in India
