= One Hundred and First Amendment to the Constitution of India =

Introduction of a Goods and Services Tax

The Constitution (One Hundred and First Amendment) Act, 2017

Parliament of India
- Long title: An Act further to amend the Constitution of India.
- Citation: One Hundred and First Amendment of the Constitution of India
- Territorial extent: India
- Passed by: Lok Sabha
- Passed: 8 August 2016
- Passed by: Rajya Sabha
- Passed: 3 August 2016
- Assented to: 8 September 2016
- Commenced: 1 July 2017

Legislative history

Initiating chamber: Lok Sabha
- Bill title: The Constitution (One Hundred and Twenty-Second Amendment) Bill, 2014
- Bill citation: Bill No. 192 of 2014
- Introduced by: Arun Jaitley
- Introduced: 19 December 2014
- Committee report: Report of the Select Committee
- Status: In force

Officially known as The Constitution (One Hundred and First Amendment) Act, 2016, this amendment introduced a national Goods and Services Tax (GST) in India from 1 July 2017. It was introduced as the One Hundred and Twenty Second Amendment Bill of the Constitution of India,

The Goods and Services Tax (GST) is a Value added Tax (VAT) proposed to be a comprehensive indirect tax levy on manufacture, sale and consumption of goods as well as services at the national level. It replaces all indirect taxes levied on goods and services by the Indian Central and state governments. It is aimed at being comprehensive for most goods and services.

== Background ==
An empowered union committee was set up by the Vajpayee administration to streamline the GST model to be adopted and to develop the required back-end infrastructure that would be needed for its implementation.

In his budget speech on 28 February 2006, P. Chidambaram, the Finance Minister, announced the target date for implementation of GST to be 1 April 2010 and formed another empowered committee of State Finance Ministers to design the road map. The committee submitted its report to the government in April 2008 and released its First Discussion Paper on GST in India in 2009. Since the proposal involved reform/ restructuring of not only indirect taxes levied by the Central but also the States, the responsibility of preparing a Design and Road Map for the implementation of GST was assigned to the Empowered Committee of State Finance Ministers (EC). In April 2008, the EC submitted a report, titled "A Model and Road map for Goods and Services Tax (GST) in India" containing broad recommendations about the structure and design of GST. In response to the report, the Department of Revenue made some suggestions to be incorporated in the design and structure of proposed GST bill. Based on inputs from GoI and states, The EC released its First Discussion Paper on Goods and Services Tax in India on 10 November 2009 with the objective of generating a debate and obtaining inputs from all stakeholders.

A dual GST module for the country has been proposed by the EC. This dual GST model has been accepted by centre. Under this model GST have two components viz. the Central GST to be levied and collected by the Centre and the State GST to be levied and collected by the respective States. Central Excise duty, additional excise duty, Service Tax, and additional duty of customs (equivalent to excise), State VAT, entertainment tax, taxes on lotteries, betting and gambling and entry tax (not levied by local bodies) would be subsumed within GST. Other taxes which will be subsumed with GST are Octroi, entry tax and luxury tax thus making it a single indirect tax in India.

To take the GST related work further, a Joint Working Group consisting of officers from Central as well as State Government was constituted. This was further trifurcated into three Sub-Working Groups to work separately on draft legislation required for GST, process/forms to be followed in GST regime and IT infrastructure development needed for smooth functioning of proposed GST. In addition, an Empowered Group for development of IT Systems required for Goods and Services Tax regime has been set up under the chairmanship of Dr. Shruti Negi.

== Legislative history ==
On 29 March 2017, CGST, IGST, UTGST and SGST compensation law passed in Lok Sabha.

The Constitution (One Hundred and Twenty-Second Amendment) Bill, 2014 was introduced in the Lok Sabha by Finance Minister Arun Jaitley on 19 December 2014, and passed by the House on 6 May 2015. In the Council of States (Rajya Sabha), the bill was referred to a Select Committee on 14 May 2015. The Select Committee of the Rajya Sabha submitted its report on the bill on 22 July 2015. The bill was passed by the Rajya Sabha on 3 August 2016, and the amended bill was passed by the Lok Sabha on 8 August 2016.

The bill, after ratification by the States, received assent from President Pranab Mukherjee on 8 September 2016, and was notified in The Gazette of India on the same date.

== Ratification ==
The Act was passed in accordance with the provisions of Article 368 of the Constitution, and has been ratified by more than half of the State Legislatures, as required under Clause (2) of the said article. On 12 August 2016, Assam became the first state to ratify the bill, when the Assam Legislative Assembly unanimously approved it. State Legislatures that ratified the amendment are listed below:

1. Assam (12 August 2016)
2. Bihar (16 August 2016)
3. Jharkhand (17 August 2016)
4. Chhattisgarh (22 August 2016)
5. Himachal Pradesh (22 August 2016)
6. Gujarat (23 August 2016)
7. Delhi (24 August 2016)
8. Madhya Pradesh (24 August 2016)
9. Nagaland (26 August 2016)
10. Haryana (29 August 2016)
11. Maharashtra (29 August 2016)
12. Mizoram (30 August 2016)
13. Sikkim (30 August 2016)
14. Telangana (30 August 2016)
15. Goa (31 August 2016).

The amendment was subsequently ratified by:

1. Odisha (1 September 2016)
2. Puducherry (2 September 2016)
3. Rajasthan (2 September 2016)
4. Andhra Pradesh (8 September 2016)
5. Arunachal Pradesh (8 September 2016)
6. Meghalaya (9 September 2016)
7. Punjab (12 September 2016)
8. Tripura (26 September 2016)
9. Uttarakhand (2 May 2017)
10. Uttar Pradesh (16 May 2017)
11. Manipur (5 June 2017)
12. Karnataka (16 June 2017)
13. Tamil Nadu (19 June 2017)
14. Kerala (21 June 2017)
15. Jammu and Kashmir (5 July 2017)
16. West Bengal (8 August 2017)

== See also ==
- Goods and Services Tax (India)
- Goods and Services Tax (Australia)
- Goods and Services Tax (Canada)
- Goods and Services Tax (Hong Kong)
- Goods and Services Tax (Malaysia)
- Goods and Services Tax (New Zealand)
- Goods and Services Tax (Singapore)
