= Goods and Services Tax (India) =

Value-added indirect tax in India

Goods and Services Tax (GST) is an indirect tax in India that replaced several earlier taxes, including VAT, service tax, central excise duty on most goods, entertainment tax, and octroi. These were replaced by a single, comprehensive levy, imposed concurrently by the centre and state governments, with limited exceptions. It is a multi-stage tax levied at each stage of production and distribution, with businesses claiming input tax credits, so the ultimate burden falls on the consumer. The revenue accrues to the state where goods or services are consumed rather than where they are produced.

The tax took effect on 1 July 2017 through the 101^{st} Amendment to the Indian Constitution; the day is marked as GST day. GST was initially introduced with five tax slabs—0%, 5%, 12%, 18%, and 28%. Petroleum products, alcoholic beverages, and electricity were excluded and are still taxed separately by state governments. Rough precious and semi-precious stones attract a special 0.25% rate, and gold at 3%. A compensation cess of up to 22% applies, in addition to 28% GST, on luxury and 'sin' goods such as aerated drinks, luxury cars, and tobacco products.

On 3 September 2025, the GST Council approved a reduction in rates on many goods, which the government presented as a way to support consumption and offset the effect of United States tariffs. The changes, effective from 22 September 2025, replaced the 12 and 28% rates with two primary rates: 5% and 18%, and a 40% rate for luxury and 'sin' goods. The GST Council, which includes the union finance minister and their state counterparts, recommends tax rates, rules, and regulations. Supporters credit GST with creating a national market: the Ministry of Road Transport and Highways claims that interstate travel time fell by 20% after check posts were removed. Opponents have criticised multiple rates, compliance burden, refund delays, and impact on small businesses.

== Formation ==
The reform of India's indirect tax regime was initiated in 1986 by V. P. Singh, the Finance Minister in Rajiv Gandhi's government, with the introduction of the Modified Value Added Tax (MODVAT). Subsequently, Prime Minister P. V. Narasimha Rao and the Finance Minister Manmohan Singh initiated preliminary discussions on a Value Added Tax (VAT) at the state level. A single common Goods and Services Tax (GST) was proposed and endorsed in 1999 during a meeting between the Prime Minister Atal Bihari Vajpayee and his economic advisory panel, which comprised three former RBI governors I. G. Patel, Bimal Jalan and C. Rangarajan. Vajpayee set up a committee headed by the Ministry of Finance of West Bengal, helmed by Asim Dasgupta, to design a GST model.

The Asim Dasgupta committee, which was also tasked with putting in place the back-end technology and logistics (later came to be known as the GST Network, or GSTN, in 2015), later came out for unveiling a uniform taxation regime in the country. In 2002, the Vajpayee government constituted a task force under Vijay Kelkar to recommend tax reforms. In 2005, the Kelkar committee recommended rolling out GST as suggested by the Twelfth Finance Commission.

After the defeat of the BJP-led NDA government in the 2004 Indian general election and the ascension of a Congress-led UPA government, the new Finance Minister P. Chidambaram, in February 2006, continued the efforts to implement GST and proposing its rollout by 1 April 2010. However, in 2011, with the Trinamool Congress routing CPI(M) out of power in West Bengal, Asim Dasgupta resigned as the head of the GST committee. Dasgupta admitted in an interview that 80% of the task had been done.

The UPA introduced the 115th Constitution Amendment Bill on 22 March 2011 in the Lok Sabha to bring about the GST. It ran into opposition from the Bharatiya Janata Party and other parties, and was referred to a Standing Committee headed by the BJP's former Finance Minister Yashwant Sinha. The committee submitted its report in August 2013, but in October 2013, Gujarat Chief Minister Narendra Modi, who eventually became the Prime Minister in 2014, raised objections that led to the bill's indefinite postponement. Jairam Ramesh, the Minister for Rural Development, attributed the GST Bill's failure to the "single handed opposition of Narendra Modi".

In the 2014 Indian general election, the Bharatiya Janata Party (BJP)-led NDA government was elected into power. With the consequential dissolution of the 15th Lok Sabha, the GST Bill—approved by the standing committee for reintroduction—lapsed. Seven months after the formation of the Modi government, the new Finance Minister Arun Jaitley introduced the GST Bill in the Lok Sabha, where the BJP had a majority. In February 2015, Jaitley set another deadline of 1 April 2017 to implement GST. In May 2016, the Lok Sabha passed the Constitution Amendment Bill, clearing the way for the GST. However, the Opposition, led by the Congress, sought that the GST Bill be again sent back for review to the Select Committee of the Rajya Sabha due to disagreements on several clauses in the Bill relating to taxation. In August 2016, the Amendment Bill was passed, becoming The Constitution (One Hundred and First Amendment) Act, 2016. Within the next 15 to 20 days, 18 states ratified the Bill, and President Pranab Mukherjee gave his assent to it.

A 21-member selected committee was formed to look into the proposed GST laws. After the GST Council approved the Central Goods and Services Tax Bill 2017, the Integrated Goods and Services Tax Bill 2017, the Union Territory Goods and Services Tax Bill 2017, and the Goods and Services Tax (Compensation to the States) Bill 2017 were passed by the Lok Sabha on 29 March 2017. The Rajya Sabha passed these Bills on 6 April 2017, whereupon they were enacted as Acts on 12 April 2017. Thereafter, the legislatures of different states passed their respective State Goods and Services Tax Bills. After the enactment of various GST laws, the Goods and Services Tax was launched all over India with effect from 1 July 2017. The Jammu and Kashmir state legislature passed its GST act on 7 July 2017, thereby ensuring that the entire nation was brought under a unified indirect taxation system. There was to be no GST on the sale and purchase of securities. That continues to be governed by Securities Transaction Tax (STT).

== Implementation ==
The GST was launched at midnight on 1 July 2017 by the President of India, and the Government of India. The launch was commemorated by a symbolic midnight session (30 June – 1 July) of both the houses convened at the Central Hall of the Parliament. Though the session was attended by distinguished dignitaries from the business and the entertainment industries, it was boycotted by the opposition due to its apprehension over looming concerns for the middle and lower class Indians following its implementation. The tax was strongly opposed by the largest opposition party, the Indian National Congress. It is one of the few midnight sessions that have been held by the parliament, the others being the declaration of India's independence on 15 August 1947, and the silver and golden jubilees of that occasion.

Members of the Congress boycotted the GST launch altogether. They were joined by members of the Trinamool Congress, Communist Parties of India and the Dravida Munnetra Kazhagam. The parties reported that they found virtually no difference between the GST and the existing taxation system, claiming that the government was trying to merely rebrand the current taxation system. They also argued that the GST would increase existing rates on common daily goods while reducing rates on luxury items, and affect many Indians adversely, especially the middle, lower middle and poorer income groups, who constitute the vast majority of Indians.

== Dissolution of the National Anti-Profiteering Authority (NAA) ==
Introduced as part of the original GST rollout in July 2017, the anti-profiteering framework was established through Section 171(2) of the Central Goods and Services Tax Act, which mandated that any reduction in tax rates or the availability of input tax credits be passed on to consumers through a commensurate reduction in prices. To enforce this, the government set up the National Anti-Profiteering Authority (NAA) in November 2017 as a statutory body tasked with investigating unfair profiteering practices by registered suppliers.

Initially constituted for a two-year term, the NAA was granted multiple extensions as profiteering concerns persisted. However, the institutional structure underwent gradual modification: from 1 December 2022, the authority to handle anti-profiteering complaints was transferred to the Competition Commission of India (CCI). A subsequent notification dated 1 October 2024 empowered the Principal Bench of the GST Appellate Tribunal (GSTAT) to assume adjudicatory jurisdiction. The same notification also set 1 April 2025 as the official sunset date for the anti-profiteering provisions under GST law, after which no new complaints would be accepted. Existing complaints lodged before this date continue to be adjudicated by GSTAT.

The government cited simplification of compliance and a reliance on market forces for the discontinuation of the statutory anti-profiteering mechanism, though the long-term impact on consumer protection remains to be assessed.

== 2025 reforms ==
The proposal to revamp GST rates gained traction in policy circles in subsequent years post launch in 2017. The idea was eventually formalized by the Ministry of Finance, which launched a review of the 2017 GST framework. Several expert committees were formed to analyse which goods and services should be taxed at lower or higher rates, with a focus on equity, simplicity and growth. Positioned as both a continuation and an upgrade of the original 2017 GST framework, these reforms aimed to simplify the tax structure, reduce compliance burdens for businesses, and recalibrate rates to better suit the evolving economic landscape.

On 15 August 2025, Prime Minister Narendra Modi publicly announced his government's intention to rationalise GST rate slabs in anticipation of Diwali. Thereafter, the new rates, comprising two primary rates of 5% and 18%, were announced, and, on 22 September 2025, the reforms officially came into effect across India. The rollout included detailed guidelines for businesses, online portals for filing returns, and public awareness campaigns to help citizens understand the changes. It was widely perceived as an effort to make India's indirect tax system more adaptive, transparent and efficient. The unveiling of the GST reforms occurred against the backdrop of the second Trump administration imposing tariffs on India, which are anticipated to have a major impact on the Indian economy. The Ministry of Finance expects the GST reforms will mitigate the effects of the American tariffs, which will have significant implications on over half of India's $85 billion annual exports to the US. Furthermore, the rate cuts were spurred by a desire to stimulate consumer spending amidst stagnating wages and depleting discretionary spending capacity of India consumers.

Following the implementation of the reforms, the government monitored its impact on different sectors. Industries like manufacturing, retail and services experienced changes in compliance procedures, while consumers noticed adjustments in prices for everyday goods.

However, at the heels of the reform rollout, the Ministry of Finance clarified that the government had no intentions of reviving the National Anti-Profiteering Authority (NAA). Instead, the Finance Ministry indicated that it would rely on market competition to ensure that reductions in GST rates are passed on to consumers through lower retail prices.

=== Economic and fiscal impact of reforms ===
The government anticipates a revenue loss of approximately ₹930 billion resulting from the reduction in GST rates across various sectors. Conversely, the introduction of a 40% GST slab is expected to generate an additional ₹450 billion in revenue. Considering both the revenue loss and the additional revenue, the net impact is estimated to be a loss of around ₹480 billion. Analysts estimate this measure will strain the exchequer considerably, more so in the light of tepid uptick in revenue collection. It has also been stated this rationalisation will have considerable negative impact on government spending on infrastructure too.

Despite the net revenue loss, the reforms are projected to stimulate consumer spending. According to SBI Research, the direct consumption boost is speculated to be around ₹700 billion, with total additional aggregate demand reaching ₹1.98 trillion (short scale) due to the multiplier effect.

== Tax ==
=== Taxes subsumed ===
The single GST subsumed several taxes and levies, which includes central excise duty, services tax, additional customs duty, surcharges, state-level value added tax and octroi. Other levies that were applicable on inter-state transportation of goods have also been done away with in the GST regime. GST is levied on all transactions such as sale, transfer, purchase, barter, lease, or import of goods and/or services.

India adopted a dual GST model, meaning that taxation is administered by both the Union and state governments. Transactions made within a single state are levied with Central GST (CGST) by the Central Government and State GST (SGST) by the State governments. For inter-state transactions and imported goods or services, an Integrated GST (IGST) is levied by the Central Government. GST is a consumption-based tax/destination-based tax; therefore, taxes are paid by the state where the goods or services are consumed not the state in which they were produced. IGST complicates tax collection for state governments by preventing them from directly collecting the tax owed to them from the central government. Under the previous system, each state could collect tax revenue directly from a single authority, making the process simpler.

=== Revenue Neutral Rate ===
RNR is a single GST rate that generates exactly the same revenue as the pre-GST content taxes (Central and States combined) in a given base year. This ensures fiscal neutrality during the transition period.

Formula (simple version used by the Committee): RNR = R/B

where:

R = Total revenue from subsumed taxes in the base year (₹ lakh crore, excluding liquor/property as it does not fall under GST and still exists with state VAT).

B = Estimated GST tax base (taxable value of goods + services after exemptions, input credits, exports, thresholds, etc.).

- revenue-neutral rate of 15–15.5% as suggested by the committee headed by Chief Economic Advisor Arvind Subramanian.

The committee proposed 12% (lower tax), 17–18% for standard rate and 40% sin tax.

On 1 July 2017, the GST Council, during the initial tax assessment, classified about 1,211 items (based on HSN codes/customs duty categories) into the following tax brackets: 0% or zero rate, 5%, 12%, 18% and 28%.

Before the introduction of GST on 2017, the Arvind Subramanian-led committee had recommended 15.3% as the revenue neutral rate. That is, it was estimated that if the tax was collected at this rate on average, the government would not lose revenue. However, the subsequent GST tax reforms resulted in a reduction in tax on many items and a change in tax brackets, resulting in an effective tax rate of 11.6%. It is estimated that this will save people at least approximately Rs 100,000 over their lifetime.

Revenue-neutral rate
Year	Percentage (%)
2015 RNR committee	15.3
2017 May	14.4
2017 Nov	12.6
2018 Jan	12.2
2018 Jul	11.8
2018 Dec	11.6
2019 Jul–Sep	11.6
2023 Sep	12.2

=== HSN code ===
India is a member of World Customs Organization (WCO) since 1971. From the outset, India originally used six-digit HSN codes to classify commodities for Customs and Central Excise. The Customs and Central Excise eventually added two more digits to make the codes more precise, resulting in an eight-digit classification. The purpose of HSN codes is to make GST systematic and globally accepted.

The Harmonized System of Nomenclature (HSN) code is used for classifying goods under the Goods and Services Tax (GST) in India. The HSN code is a six-digit code that uniquely identifies a product. The first two digits of the code identify the chapter, the next two digits identify the heading, and the last two digits identify the subheading.

HSN codes eliminate the need to upload detailed descriptions of goods, thereby saving time and simplifying the filing process, especially as GST returns are increasingly automated.

If a company has turnover up to ₹15 million (US$160,000) in the preceding financial year, then it need not mention the HSN code while supplying goods on invoices. If a company has turnover more than ₹15 million (US$160,000) but up to ₹50 million (US$530,000), then it needs to mention the first two digits of HSN code while supplying goods on invoices. If its turnover crosses ₹50 million (US$530,000) then it needs to mention the first four digits of HSN code on invoices.

=== Rate ===
As of 22 September 2025, GST in India follows a simplified structure with four standard rates: 0% and 5% for essential goods and services, 18% as the standard rate, and 40% for luxury and sin goods. These changes were introduced by the Indian government on 3 September 2025 to boost consumption and mitigate the impact of tariffs imposed by Trump administration, and came into effect later 22 September, onwards. This reform eliminated the 12% and 28% GST slabs, significantly simplifying the overall tax structure.

In his Independence Day speech in 2025, Prime Minister Narendra Modi announced that GST rate changes would be implemented by Diwali, an announcement fulfilled through the September 2025 reforms.

The GST is imposed at variable rates on variable items. Preceding the reforms of September 2025, GST commenced with multiple slab rates, namely 0%, 5%, 12%, 18%, 28% and 40%. Several essential goods were exempt from GST, including dairy products, products of milling industries, fresh vegetables and fruits, meat products, and other basic groceries and necessities.

Following the introduction of GST in July 2017, check-posts across the country were gradually abolished, enabling faster movement of goods and reducing logistics time. This was further supported by the subsuming of octroi within the GST framework.

To protect states' revenue interests, the Central Government, in the months preceding the GST rollout in 2017, proposed a compensation mechanism and anticipated the eventual inclusion of petroleum and petroleum products under GST. States were assured compensation for any revenue loss for five years from the implementation of GST. However, no binding legislation has yet been enacted to formalize this commitment. In an effort to ensure stability, the GST Council adopted a concept paper discouraging frequent changes to GST rates.

The central government released ₹353 billion (US$3.8 billion) to states as GST compensation. For the implementation, this amount was given to states to compensate for the revenue. Central government has had to face many criticisms for delays in compensation.

=== E-way bill ===
An e-Way Bill is an electronic permit for shipping goods similar to a waybill. It is an electronic bill; there is no requirement for a paper bill. It was made mandatory for inter-state transport of goods from 1 June 2018. It is required to be generated for every inter-state movement of goods beyond 10 kilometres (6.2 mi) for merchandise worth above ₹50,000 (US$530).

Registered GST taxpayers can register in the e-Way Bill Portal using GSTIN. Unregistered persons or transporters can enrol in the e-Way Bill System by providing their PAN and Aadhaar. Suppliers, recipients and transporters can generate the e-Way Bill.

The validity of e-Way Bill is fixed as one day for every 200 km or part thereof. The validity can be extended online before its expiration.

Contents of Part-A of the Form EWB-01 cannot be edited or modified once generated. Part-B can be updated with vehicle details/ RR/Airway Bill etc.

=== Intra-state e-way bill ===
The five states piloting the project—Andhra Pradesh, Gujarat, Kerala, Telangana and Uttar Pradesh, which together accounted for 61.8% of inter-state e-way bills—began mandatory intra-state e-way bill implementation on 15 April 2018 to further curb tax evasion. It was successfully introduced in Karnataka from 1 April 2018. The intrastate e-way bill paved the way for a seamless, nationwide single e-way bill system. Six more states—Jharkhand, Bihar, Tripura, Madhya Pradesh, Uttarakhand and Haryana—rolled it out from 20 April 2018. All states were mandated to introduce it by 30 May 2018.

=== Reverse charge mechanism ===
Reverse Charge Mechanism (RCM) is a system in GST where the receiver pays the tax on behalf of unregistered, smaller material and service suppliers. The receiver of the goods is eligible for Input Tax Credit (ITC), while the unregistered dealer is not.

=== Goods excluded from the GST ===
- Tobacco products: Products like cigarettes and other tobacco-based items attract separate taxes.
- Alcohol for human consumption (i.e., not for commercial use).
- Petrol and petroleum products (while the government stated during the introduction of GST in 2017 that these items would eventually be brought under GST, as of 2025, no concrete progress has been made): petroleum crude, high-speed diesel, motor spirit (petrol), natural gas, aviation turbine fuel.

== Revenue distribution ==
Revenue earned from GST on intra-state transactions—where both the seller and the buyer are located in the same state—is shared equally between the central and the respective state governments, on a 50:50 basis. For instance, if the state of Goa collects a total GST revenue of ₹100 million (US$1.2 million) from intra-state transactions in January, then ₹50 million (US$590,000) would be allocated to the Central Government as Central GST (CGST), while the remaining ₹50 million (US$590,000) would go to the Government of Goa as State GST (SGST).

For inter-state transactions, where the seller and buyer are located in different states, the Integrated GST (IGST) is collected by the Central Government and subsequently shared with the state where the goods are consumed (imported). For example, if a seller 'A' from Goa sells a product to a buyer 'B' located in Punjab, the IGST collected on this transaction is shared equally on an equal between the Central Government and the Punjab State Government.

== GST Council ==
The GST Council is the governing body responsible for overseeing the implementation and regulation of the Goods and Services Tax in India. It consists of 33 members—including 2 members from the Government of India and 31 members from 28 states and 3 Union Territories with legislatures. The Council acts as the apex decision-making committee, empowered to modify, reconcile, or introduce laws and regulations related to GST in India. The council also makes recommendations to the Parliament of India regarding the creation or amendment of laws concerning taxes on goods and services. The Council is overseen by the Union Finance Minister and is assisted by the finance ministers of all the states.

The council comprises the following members:

- The Union Finance Minister, who serves as the Chairperson;
- The Union Ministers of State in charge of revenue or finance;
- The finance or taxation ministers (or other nominated ministers) from each state government.

Nirmala Sitharaman, in her capacity as the Union Finance Minister, is the incumbent Chairperson of the GST Council.

The 54th GST Council Meeting was held on 9 September 2024.

=== Current members of the GST council ===
S.No.	Member	Portfolio
1.	Nirmala Sitharaman	Union Finance Minister
2.	Pankaj Chaudhary	Union Minister of State (Finance)
3.	Payyavula Keshav	Finance Minister; Government of Andhra Pradesh
4.	Chowna Mein	Finance Minister; Government of Arunachal Pradesh
5.	Ajanta Neog	Finance Minister; Government of Assam
6.	Samrat Choudhary	Finance Minister; Government of Bihar
7.	O. P. Choudhary	Finance Minister; Government of Chhattisgarh
8.	Atishi	Finance Minister; Government of Delhi
9.	Pramod Sawant	Finance Minister; Government of Goa
10.	Kanubhai Desai	Finance Minister; Government of Gujarat
11.	Nayab Singh Saini	Finance Minister; Government of Haryana
12.	Sukhvinder Singh Sukhu	Finance Minister; Government of Himachal Pradesh
13.	Omar Abdullah	Finance Minister; Government of Jammu & Kashmir
14.	Radha Krishna Kishore	Minister for Finance; Government of Jharkhand
15.	Siddaramaiah	Finance Minister; Government of Karnataka
16	K. N. Balagopal	Finance Minister, Kerala
17	Jagdish Devda	Deputy Chief Minister, Madhya Pradesh
18	Devendra Fadnavis	Deputy Chief Minister, Maharashtra
19	Sapam Ranjan Singh	Minister For Medical, Health, and Family Welfare Department, Manipur
20	Conrad Sangma	Chief Minister, Meghalaya
21	Lalduhoma	Chief Minister, Mizoram
22	Neiphiu Rio	Chief Minister, Nagaland
23	Niranjan Pujari	Minister of Finance and Excise, Odisha
24	K. Lakshminarayanan	Public Works Minister, Puducherry
25	Harpal Singh Cheema	Finance Minister, Punjab
26	Diya Kumari	Deputy Chief Minister, Rajasthan
27	Bedu Singh Panth	Minister for Tourism, Civil Aviation and Industries, Sikkim
28	Thangam Thennarasu	Minister for Finance, Human Resource Management, Tamil Nadu
29	Mallu Bhatti Vikramarka	Finance Minister, Telangana
30	Pranjit Singha Roy	Finance Minister, Tripura
31	Suresh Kumar Khanna	Minister for Finance, Parliamentary Affairs, and Medical Education, Uttar Pradesh
32	Premchand Aggarwal	Finance Minister, Uttarakhand
33	Chandrima Bhattacharya	Minister of State for Finance, West Bengal

== Goods and Services Tax Network (GSTN) ==
The GSTN software, developed by Infosys Technologies, operates on an IT infrastructure maintained by the National Informatics Centre (NIC). The Goods and Services Tax Network (GSTN) is a non-profit organization established to create a centralized, secure portal for stakeholders, government agencies and taxpayers. This portal enables tax authorities to monitor transactions effectively, while providing taxpayers seamless access for filing returns and managing their tax obligations.

The GSTN's authorized capital is ₹100 million (US$1.2 million). Initially, the Central Government and state governments each held 24.5% of the shares, while the remaining 51% were held by non-government financial institutions: HDFC and HDFC Bank (20%), ICICI Bank (10%), NSE Strategic Investment (10%) and LIC Housing Finance (11%).

However, the GSTN was later converted into a wholly government-owned company, with equal shareholding between the Central and state governments.

== Statistics ==
Goods and Services Tax (India) Revenue Statistics.

=== Revenue collections ===
Statistical Details of GST Revenue Collected.

=== Reply ===
Statistical Details of GST Returns filed.

Approximately 3.8 million new taxpayers have registered under the GST regime, bringing the total number of taxpayers to over 10 million, including the 6.4 million registered prior to GST. By October 2018, this number had surpassed 11.4 million.t

== Criticism ==
The technicalities of GST implementation in India have faced criticism from global financial institutions, industry experts, sections of the Indian media and opposition political parties. The World Bank's 2018 India Development Update described India's GST as overly complex, highlighting several flaws compared to systems in other countries—most notably its then second-highest tax rate of 28% among a sample of 115 countries, a rate that has since been revised.

GST implementation in India has also drawn criticism from Indian businesspeople due to issues such as delays in tax refunds and the excessive documentation and administrative burden involved. A partner at PwC India noted that when the first GST returns were filed in August 2017, the system crashed under the heavy volume of submissions.

The opposition Indian National Congress has been among the most vocal critics of GST implementation in India. Party President Rahul Gandhi has accused the BJP-led government of "destroying small businessmen and industries" through the tax regime. He went on to pejoratively dub GST as the "Gabbar Singh Tax" after an ill-famed, fictional dacoit in Bollywood. Rahul Gandhi described GST as a "way of removing money from the pockets of the poor" and labelled it a "big failure." He has also pledged that, if elected to power, the Congress party would implement a single-slab GST to replace the current multi-slab system. In the run-up to various state elections in 2018, Rahul Gandhi intensified his criticisms of the Modi administration's GST policies.

According to estimates, approximately 230,000 small businesses have shut down due to complications arising from GST compliance.

The GST system has faced criticism for imposing higher taxes on affordable goods. For example, bicycles—which are primarily used by low-income and rural populations—are taxed at 12%, increasing their retail cost. Manufacturers have lobbied to reduce the GST rate on both regular and electric bicycles from 12% to 5% to improve affordability for low-income groups and daily-wage earners.

An analysis by the Centre for Science and Environment found that the GST framework encouraged linear consumption rather than supporting a circular economy. Informal workers in industries such as waste picking particularly endure the system's complexity as a barrier to building businesses that create circularity.

=== Impact on sports equipment imports ===
Following the implementation of the Goods and Services Tax (GST) on 1 July 2017, the shooting community in India raised significant concerns over the taxation of imported sports equipment, which had previously been exempt from duties. The new structure imposed a 28% GST rate on imported pistols and revolvers, 18% on rifles, shotguns and ammunition, and 12% on accessories. This led to a substantial increase in the cost of high-quality imported equipment from major manufacturing countries like Germany, Italy and the UK. The increased financial burden was particularly difficult for aspiring athletes from modest backgrounds, whose families often secured loans to afford equipment essential for training and competition, leading to concerns that the policy would discourage participation and hinder India's international competitiveness.

The issue quickly became a national campaign against the taxation of sports goods, led by prominent members of the shooting fraternity. Renowned pistol shooter and coach Jaspal Rana, a multiple-time Asian Games and Commonwealth Games gold medallist, was a vocal critic, publicly questioning the perceived inaction of the National Rifle Association of India (NRAI) and the government regarding the policy's adverse effects on athletes. Journalist and national-level pistol shooter Farid Ali also significantly amplified the cause, using his platform to raise awareness through news reports on major networks, including Aaj Tak and the India Today Network, alongside extensive social media advocacy. These public efforts prompted the NRAI to formally petition the Finance Ministry for immediate relief.

NRAI Senior Vice-President and Member of Parliament Kalikesh Narayan Singh Deo subsequently raised the issue in the Lok Sabha on 4 August 2017, arguing for GST exemptions to ensure athletes' access to affordable equipment. The campaign also received support from the Union Sports Minister, Colonel Rajyavardhan Singh Rathore, who endorsed the request for policy changes. In November 2017, the GST Council granted an exemption from the Integrated Goods and Services Tax (IGST) for imported sports goods of a "specific nature" used by renowned and aspiring athletes. This move was welcomed by the shooting community as a progressive step to alleviate financial pressures and boost talent development.

== See also ==
- The Great Hedge of India, a historic colonial-era inland customs border
- Goods and services tax (Australia)
- Goods and services tax (Canada)
- Goods and services tax (Hong Kong)
- Goods and Services Tax (Malaysia)
- Goods and Services Tax (Singapore)
