= Old Pension Scheme =

Pension scheme in India

Old Pension Scheme (OPS) in India was abolished as a part of pension reforms by Union Government. Repealed from 1 January 2004, it had a defined-benefit (DB) pension of half the Last Pay Drawn (LPD) at the time of retirement along with components like Dearness Allowances (DA) etc. OPS was an unfunded pension scheme financed on a pay-as-you-go (PAYG) basis in which current revenues of the government funded the pension benefit for its retired employees. Old Pension Scheme was replaced by a restructured defined-contribution (DC) pension scheme called the National Pension System.

The Union Government's pension liabilities in Budget Estimate 2022–2023 on account of Old Pension Scheme for existing retirees was ₹2.07 lakh crore. The cost of pension for all State Government's combined Budget Estimate 2022-2023 was ₹4,63,436.9 Crores.

== History ==
The practice of pension payment to retired employees is evident in Colonial India since 1881. OPS has its origins since British rule when the Royal Commission (Lee Commission) on civil establishments in 1924 recommended half the salary during active service to be given as pension after retirement for its recruits serving in India. Adoption of Government of India Act 1935 further strengthened the provisions of pension benefits to government employees in the pre-independence era.

== Benefit ==
An employee joining the central or state services prior to 1 January 2004 would receive pension payments as lifetime income security from the time of retirement (at age 58, in most cases) until death. This was an entitlement for government employees for their services rendered during the tenure which often lasted more than three decades. The amount received monthly as Superannuation Pension was derived from number of years served and 10-month average salary before the retirement. However, Gratuity and Provident Fund are received as lumpsum at the time of retirement.

== Current Beneficiaries ==
- Soldiers employed in Indian Armed Forces continues to have OPS in the form of service pension after their retirement.
- MPs and MLAs have the lifetime benefit of Old Pension Scheme with continued monthly income with all other benefits, after serving one tenure of five years.
- High Court and Supreme Court judges, along with Comptroller and Auditor General are eligible for lifetime defined benefit pension under OPS.

=== Exception ===
Existing faculties from of Indian Institutes of Technology (IITs), Indian Institutes of Management (IIMs), Indian Institute of Science (IISc), Central Universities, and dozens of other CEIs shifting from one such institution to another after January 2004 were allowed by the HRD Ministry to continue with OPS.

Following a supreme court order in 2023, Department of Pension and Pensioners’ Welfare (DPPW) allowed the employees who joined the Central government services as per posts advertised or notified before 22 December 2003 one-time option to choose OPS before 31 August 2023.

== Defined Benefit Pension vs. Defined Contribution Pension ==
Defined Benefit (DB) scheme like OPS is a type in which the beneficiary pension is based on a defined formula which may have a percentage of salary or a percentage of salary times the years of service or a flat rate per year of service as its parameters. The simple administration with provision for a secure income for pensioners is the advantage of this scheme while the employer, i.e., government in this case, bears the risk. Having a pure DB or PAYG system of pension costs heavily on the Government finances. The scheme is non-contributory, i.e. the workers do not contribute during their working lives.

Defined Contribution (DC) scheme like NPS is a type of in which the beneficiary makes contributions to a retirement fund during his service and the receivable pension is based on the balance in his pension fund at the time of his retirement. The fund balance is sum of individual contribution and the accrued yield earned on the investment of fund over a period of time. DC scheme provides more flexible and easy portable retirement benefits for the pensioner. In India's context, the extent of benefit at retirement relies upon the quantum of employee's along with the government's contribution and the returns thereon, while the investment risk is borne by the employees.

Since pension is both a reward for continuous service till the formal age of retirement as well as a form social security in old age, India favored a restructured pension ensuring a balance between retirement benefit of the government employees and the financial burden on the economy by moving from DB scheme to DC scheme.

== Pay-As-You-Go (PAYG) ==
Under a PAYG scheme, current generation of workers contributes by paying taxes for the pensions of retired workers belonging to previous generation. This can be seen as direct transfer of resources from younger generation to older generation. It can have positive impact on poverty through income transfer to poorer workers. PAYG works well in the booming economy where active contributors outnumber the current pensioners. When the population of retirees is far less than population of productive young workers (low old age dependency ratio), the scheme yields high benefits with low contributions. Life expectancy in India has increased drastically over the decades. High old age dependency ratio and increasing number of unemployed youth could make this kind of unfunded schemes highly unviable.

== Pension Reforms ==
A Policy Research Report by World Bank in 1994 titled "Averting the Old Age Crisis" gave rise to the worldwide discussion on pension sector reforms. A High Level Expert Group on Pension was constituted on 25 June 2001 by the Ministry of Personnel, Public Grievances and Pensions which found that the implementation of the Fifth Central Pay Commission's recommendations resulted in "quantum jump" of government expenditure on pensions. It recommended setting up new pension scheme with contributions from both employees and the government to a pension fund under an independent Development and Regulatory Authority. The report submitted by the group to government noted in its foreword: "The logic of the welfare state had prompted most of the developed countries to introduce increasingly liberal post-retirement benefits to their citizens. However, demographic changes in these highly industrialised and post-industrialised societies have made such pension commitments unsustainable in the long run. Pension reform has, therefore, now become a major public policy issue in most developed countries."

Reserve Bank of India (RBI) decided in its Eleventh Conference of State Finance Secretaries (2003) to constitute a group for studying "the pension liabilities of the State Governments" and to come up with suitable recommendations. The Economic Survey 2004-05 pointed out that "Unfunded pensions have become a major fiscal drag worldwide. The pressure of pensions on Central and State finances is becoming increasingly burdensome."

Congress-led United Progressive Alliance (UPA) government Pension Fund Regulatory and Development Authority (PFRDA) Bill 2005 in the Parliament to replace an Ordinance introduced in late 2004 by the earlier BJP-led National Democratic Alliance (NDA) government.

=== Arguments in favor of Pension Reforms ===
==== Financial Unsustainability ====
A major portion of outgo in government revenue is paid as pension benefits to its retired employees and hence considered as economic liability with potential to adversely impact the "fiscal soundness of the Government entities."

The Union budget of India for the year 2001-02 acknowledged that the pension liability for the government has "reached unsustainable proportions".

States' ability to meet the growing pension liabilities is directly proportional to revenue increment and decreased revenue expenditure. Huge pension costs over long time raises concerns on fiscal sustainability of the economy and given the magnitude of the problem, structural alteration in the existing pension scheme would therefore appear to be necessary.

==== Need for Wider Coverage ====
The Economic Survey 2004-05 highlighted pension reforms in the chapter on Public Finance. About 89% of working population were out of any kind of post-retirement pension benefit. India need a universal pension plan for its entire population, especially the elderly which is estimated to reach 31.5 crores (315 million) by 2050.

=== Arguments against Pension Reforms ===
==== Deferred Wage ====
The Supreme Court of India in one of its judgement noted that pension for a retiree "is neither a bounty nor a matter of grace depending upon the sweet will of the employer." It did not consider the pension as an ex gratia payment, but a payment to employees for their past services rendered. The court held that it is a social welfare measure, aimed at rendering socioeconomic justice "to those who in the heyday of their life ceaselessly toiled for the employer on an assurance that in their old age they would not be left in the lurch."

==== Pay Differential in Public and Private Sector ====
After the economic liberalization of 1991, the pay in Private sector was gradually seen as better than that in Public sector. Various studies reveal mixed evidence of one being better than other. Job security with assured pension provisions post-retirement can be an incentive to acquire and retain the talented workers. However, it is also a fact that the work efficiency of most government employees with long service is always under question.

== Financial Burden on the Economy ==
The ever increasing year-on-year budgetary allocation for pension expenditure can be attributed to a number of factors which include expansion in the number of Government employees; extension of pension benefits to those employed in various non-Government offices like Grant-in-Aid Institutions and Local Bodies; impact of various pay revisions; introduction of wage indexation, and significant improvement in life expectancy which results in prolonged payment of pension to retirees.

=== State Government ===
The cost of pension payments of the State Governments to its retired employees in 1979-80 was Rs. 268 crore. Pension expenditure of States in 1980–81 as a proportion of total revenue receipts (which includes grants & other receivables from centre) was 2.1 per cent. It almost doubled in a decade from 5.4 per cent in 1990–91 to more than 10 per cent in 2000–01. In the 1990s, State Governments expense towards pension was rising at a CAGR of 27% per annum. From 7,813 crore in 1995–96, in 2001-02 the pension expenditure of States reached Rs. 28,197 crore. The ratio of pension payments to States' own revenue receipts (which excludes receivables from centre and other monetary assistance due to federal structure) increased to a greater extent from 3.4 per cent in 1980–81 to 17.2 per cent by 2001–02. The growth of total revenue receipts of the States in two decades during the period 1980-2002 was 14.3 per cent. It was much lower than the 23.6 per cent growth in pension payments.

Combined expenditure for all states put together jumped by 125 times to Rs 386,001 crore in 2020-21 from Rs 3,131 crore in 1990–91.

RBI in its 2003 study found that the committed expenditure of few States on salary, pension and interest payable for borrowed money together has already exceeded their total revenue receipts. It also mentioned the "stray instances" of the existence of excessive count of retirees availing pension probably due to absence of periodic and strict verification of the records of all the State Government pensioners.

State governments spend huge amount of money in Pensions for its employees as compared to developmental expenditure like Health, Housing, Social Welfare for general public etc.

Comparison of various expenses in combined Budget Estimates (BE) of all States in India
Sr No.	Heads	BE 2021–22	BE 2022–23
1	Interest Payments on Debt	4,38,598.8 Crores	4,70,907.4 Crores
2	Pension for Government Employees	4,06,867.4 Cr	4,63,436.9 Cr
3	Medical and Public Health and Family Welfare	2,53,057.4 Cr	2,94,881.4 Cr
4	Rural Development	2,39,245.3 Cr	2,66,208.5 Cr
5	Social Security and Welfare	1,85,652.7 Cr	2,05,306.5 Cr
6	Welfare of SCs/STs/OBCs	1,24,753.6 Cr	1,66,361.2 Cr
7	Urban development	1,52,385.4 Cr	1,63,163.5 Cr
8	Water Supply and Sanitation	1,17,431.3 Cr	1,38,965.1 Cr
9	Housing	65,218.5 Cr	83,028.6 Cr
10	Nutrition	34,883.0 Cr	37,622.1 Cr
11	Science, Technology and Environment	4,301.7 Cr	5,241.1 Cr

Pensionary obligations to those employed in grant-in-aid (GIA) institutions and Local Bodies (LBs) is a major concern. These employees in GIAs and LBs - such as Municipalities; Panchayat raj institutions, Zilla Parishads, State Electricity Boards, Road Transport Corporations etc. - have certain advantages (e.g., non-transferability, perks, non-uniform terms and conditions of employment) which are not available to regular Government employees. As the employees of these bodies are generally not appointed by following established procedures for filling the vacancies under State Government machinery, State Governments are not legally obliged to accept any financial obligation on them.

Expenditure towards GIAs and Contributions (Compensation and Assignments to LBs), Discharge of Internal Debt and Repayment of Loan
Sr No.	Year	Expense
1	2004-05	81,803.0 Crores
2	2014-15	1,33,326.0 Cr
3	2020-21	3,69,859.4 Cr
4	2021-22 BE	4,23,804.2 Cr
5	2022-23 BE	4,79,783.6 Cr

=== Central Government ===
The pension expenditure of Central Government in 1990-91 was 0.38 per cent of GDP and 3.9 per cent of net revenue amounting to 2,138 crores. In 1993–94, the pension liability jumped to 0.6 per cent of GDP at 5,206 crores. The pension cost for exchequer was growing at a CAGR of 21% per annum in the 1990s. The pension outgo rose to 15,367 crores which was 0.56 per cent of the GDP and 5.8 per cent of net revenue receipts in 2003–04. By 2020–21, the centre's pension bill had jumped to Rs 190,886 crore, 58 times in three decades.

== Pension Politics ==
=== Criticism ===
Several states are reintroducing the old pension scheme (OPS) and this has drawn criticism from various political leaders, economists, financial planners and subject matter experts.

On several states reverting to OPS, the Finance Minister Nirmala Sitharaman expressed "We should look at a reasonable balance and what we are leaving for generations to come. Yes, you need to borrow for the economy to run, but unless we have a complete understanding of the fiscal health of the state, for not just today but future decades, the rush to a conclusion may not be good."

Raghuram Rajan, former RBI Governor in an interview at the World Economic Forum (WEF), Davos, cautioned that huge liabilities will build up in future if OPS is adopted. Later he suggested states to look for "less costly ways" to provide benefits for its retirees.

Saugata Bhattacharya, Executive VP & Chief Economist at Axis Bank, termed the disaster of bringing back of OPS as a ticking fiscal time bomb. He stated "The problem with OPS is it is benefitting a bunch of people who are on the top. Calculating all the expenditures, you have some 10-15 per cent of your receipts for development expenditures. The commitment to OPS is going to affect the development commitments. This is not sustainable in the longer run."

CRISIL Chief Economist D K Joshi pointed out "OPS is an unfunded pension and is therefore a pressure point. There is enough evidence globally, that unfunded pension schemes can lead to extreme fiscal stress at some point in time. It would be if can get that out. The New Pension Scheme is much better as at least there is funding for it."

Finance secretary T. V. Somanathan cautioned states against bringing back OPS and remarked "It is a significant issue, which if not properly addressed, can very adversely affect the finances of states that are making the changes. It is one of the cases where you are appearing to save money today while creating huge problems for future generations and future governments"

Reserve Bank of India in its 2022 bulletin on Risk Analysis of State Finances mentioned the numerous drawbacks of opting for OPS particularly in terms of medium-term fiscal sustainability and the tax burden on future generations. There will be no immediate financial strain on the budget if the states reinstate OPS. But when the recruits from 2004 to 2005 currently under NPS begin to retire from 2034 onwards, the state finances will be affected to a greater extent. Committed expenditure in the state budgets consisting of interest payments on borrowed money and salaries to government employees along with pensions for retirees accounts for a significant portion of the total revenue expenditure (over 35%) in states like Kerala, Punjab, Haryana, etc., leaving little scope for developmental expenditure.

In 2023, RBI published a report in 2023 titled 'State Finances: A Study of Budgets of 2022-23' in which it remarked the decision of some state governments to restore OPS will give rise to a major risk on "subnational fiscal horizon". It noted the decrease in overall states' budget allocations towards medical and public health.

Aditya V Kuvalekar, faculty in the Department of Economics at University of Essex, UK in his column published in The Indian Express wrote the revival of OPS in India "is bad economics and a breach of trust for taxpayers." A large chunk of government finance will go to as pension for a few retired government employees because of which many in the majority population will be deprived of basic health, education and other social welfare measures when the economic constraints rise eventually. He noted the OPS implementation is a political freebie and it will lead to wealth from poor to be taken and distributed among the economically better government employees. This, according to him, goes against the basic idea where the wealth from rich is to be distributed among the poor.

=== States ===
West Bengal and Tripura were the only two states that did not immediately repeal OPS once NPS was implemented from 1 January 2004.

After two decades of being scrapped, the OPS has been re-implemented for government employees towards fulfilling election promises in the states of Himachal Pradesh, Rajasthan, Jharkhand.

To a question in 2022 Lok Sabha session raised by Asaduddin Owaisi of AIMIM, the ruling BJP Government has clarified that there is no proposal under consideration for restoration of the Old Pension Scheme (OPS).

==== Chhattisgarh ====
Chhattisgarh adopted NPS on 1 November 2004. The Old Pension Scheme for State Government employees was reinstated by Chief Minister Bhupesh Baghel on 11 May 2022. The state government's demand for Central Government and PFRDA to return the accumulated corpus of 17,000 crores in pension funds of its three lakh employees under NPS since 2004 did not yield as there are no such provisions in the existing regulations.

==== Gujarat ====
INC leader Rahul Gandhi accused the BJP government of making elderly people dependents and promised restoration of OPS as they have done in Rajasthan and Chhattisgarh if Congress is voted to power in 2022 elections. On the lines of implementing OPS in Punjab, Aam Aadmi Party also made similar electoral promises for around seven lakh government employees of Gujarat.

==== Himachal Pradesh ====
On becoming the Chief Minister, Sukhvinder Singh Sukhu declared the Congress government will restore the Old Pension Scheme in the first cabinet meeting. The CM announced restoration of OPS benefits on 13 January 2023 for the current 1.60 lakh employees and 1.30 lakh pensioners in Himachal Pradesh. The state has a relatively high government employee ratio and 63% of its revenue receipts is spent towards payment of salaries and pensions to government employees. On 3 March 2023, the state government declared that there will be no deduction in salaries towards NPS accounts of 1.36 lakh employees effective from April and those who were retired from service after 15 May 2003 will also be eligible for OPS.

The 2004-5 state budget of Himachal Pradesh had revenue receipts of Rs 1252 crore of which Rs 591 crore was spent on pensions. For the year 2021–22, out Rs 9,282 crores revenue receipts the government paid Rs 7082 crores towards pensions. By introducing the Himachal Pradesh Fiscal Responsibility and Budget Management (Amendment) Bill, 2023, the newly formed Congress government increased limit of borrowing by additional 50% from the existing 4% of the Gross State Domestic Product (GSDP) to 6%. The state has accumulated a debt of Rs 74,622 crore and Sukhvinder Singh's government plans another debt of Rs 3,000 crore to pay salaries and arrears for its employees. This government has promised to add another 1 lakh jobs to existing 60,000 employee vacancy in its workforce.

The 2022-23 Himachal budget noted that salaries account for 26% and pensions costs 15% of states expenses. While interest payment and loan repayment together amounts to 21%, welfare schemes for general public is left with only 29% of the budget.

==== Jharkhand ====
Jharkhand state government has asked PFRDA to return the funds of their employees who joined the services after NPS came into force.

==== Punjab ====
On 18 November 2022, the state government of Punjab notified implementation of the OPS to the 1.75 lakh government employees who are presently being covered under the NPS. 1.26 lakh employees are already covered in OPS and Rs 16,746 crore is accumulated in the pension funds of its manpower recruited after implementation of NPS in the state. Punjab requires additional budget of nearly Rs 18,000 crore for implementing OPS.

==== Rajasthan ====
On 1 April 2022, Chief Minister Ashok Gehlot restored OPS in Rajasthan. The State Government demanded return of the entire corpus of 39,000 crores accumulated till date in the NPS accounts of its employees who joined the workforce after enactment of PFRDA law. Gehlot has considered the option to escalate this matter to Supreme Court if funds are not returned and claimed the BJP lost the 2022 state elections to Congress including Himachal Pradesh "over the issue of OPS".

==== Tamil Nadu ====
Tamil Nadu has not implemented the NPS for its government employees and is not in agreement with PFRDA.

==== Telangana ====
N. Uttam Kumar Reddy, Lok Sabha Congress MP from Suryapet Assembly constituency and former MLA, demanded restoration of OPS and made electoral promise of the same if Congress is voted to power in the 2023 Telangana state elections.

==== Tripura ====
Tripura scrapped OPS and implemented NPS in 2015. CPI-M formed the government in the state for nearly 25 years until BJP won the state elections in 2018. CPI-M made electoral promise to persuade the 80,800 pensioners and 1.04 lakh government employees among the 28 lakh voters in the state that OPS will be re-implemented if they vote the party to power again. Alliance of Left-Congress also promised to re-introduce OPS if they win elections in 2023.

==== West Bengal ====
By 2005–06, almost every state in India has adopted NPS for their government employees except for West Bengal.

=== National Movement for Old Pension Scheme (NMOPS) ===
An organized body aiming to mobilize all the government employees across states for demanding restoration of OPS. They claims OPS is their "right" and they will "fight for it any how any cost."

== See also ==
- Pensions in India
- Equity-linked savings scheme (ELSS)
- Income tax in India
- 401(k)
- Roth IRA
- Retirement plans in the United States
- Individual retirement account
- Unified Pension Scheme
