= Social security in India =

India has a semblance of social security legislative framework governing social security, encompassing multiple labour laws and regulations. These laws govern various aspects of social security, particularly focusing on the welfare of the workforce. The primary objective of these measures is to foster sound industrial relations, cultivate a high-quality work environment, ensure legislative compliance, and mitigate risks such as accidents and health concerns. Moreover, social security initiatives aim to safeguard against social risks such as retirement, maternity, healthcare and unemployment while tax-funded social assistance aims to reduce inequalities and poverty. The Directive Principles of State Policy, enshrined in Part IV of the Indian Constitution reflects that India is a welfare state. Article 41 of the Indian Constitution, which is one of the Directive Principles of State Policy states that, The State shall, within the limits of its economic capacity and development, make effective provision for securing the right to work, to education and to public assistance in cases of unemployment, old age, sickness and disablement, and in other cases of undeserved want. Food security to all Indians are guaranteed under the National Food Security Act, 2013 where the government provides highly subsidised food grains or a food security allowance to economically vulnerable people. The system has since been universalised with the passing of The Code on Social Security, 2020. These cover most of the Indian population with social protection in various situations in their lives.

== Overview ==
The Government's social security and welfare expenditures are a substantial portion of the official budget and as well as the budgets of social security bodies, and state and local governments play roles in developing and implementing social security policies. Additional welfare measure systems are also uniquely operated by various state governments. Aadhaar is utilised to distribute welfare measures in India.

The comprehensive social protection system of India can be categorised as the follows: social assistance (in the form of welfare payments in cash or kind funded through taxations) and mandatory social security contributory schemes mostly related to employment. The Code on Social Security, 2020 is part of the Indian labour code that deals with employees' social security and have provisions on retirement pension and provident fund, healthcare insurance and medical benefits, sick pay and leaves, unemployment benefits and paid parental leaves.

The largest social security programs backed by The Code on Social Security are:

- The Employees' Provident Fund Organisation as a mandatory defined contribution retirement plan for private sector employees. It also provides for basic life and disability insurance.
- A maternity leave benefit of 6 months alongside a one time medical bonus of Rs 3000. A further crèche allowance is to be provided by the company until the 1st year of the child.
- The Employees' State Insurance for healthcare and unemployment benefits along with sick pays and maternity benefits.
- The Unified Pension Scheme as the mandatory Pay-as-you-go pension plan for civil servants.
- The National Pension System which is increasingly gaining popularity as a voluntary option. These are funded through social insurance contributions on the payroll.
- The National Food Security Act, 2013, that assures food security to all Indians, is funded through the general taxation.

== Budget ==
As per the Economic Survey of the Government of India of 2022–23, the general government (federal, states and local bodies combined) expenditure on social protection (direct cash transfers, financial inclusion, social benefits, health and other insurances, subsidies, free school meals, rural employment guarantee and housing grants for the low income), was approximately ₹2,130,000 crore (US$220 billion), which was 8.3% of gross domestic product (GDP). These are not part of the employment related social security which are managed separately by individual bodies. If the funds spent by the EPFO, ESI and the various other provident fund bodies are taken into account, the total spending by the general government of India (centre, states and cities all together) is 12.8% of the GDP or ₹3,320,000 crore (US$340 billion).

== National level social security bodies and programs ==
This section covers some of the social programs and welfare measures in place in India at the federal level. These can be categorized into two: 1) Social security, which mostly run through mandatory or voluntary contributions on the payroll and 2) Social assistance, which is funded through taxes. These programs' funding can be categorised as: non-contributory and tax-payer-funded, employer-funded and lastly, joint-funded (contributed by both the employer and the employee and partially contributed by the government).

=== Social Security ===
These are retirement, healthcare, disability, childcare, gratuity and provident fund and insurance programs mostly governed by The Code on Social Security, 2020, most of which are mandatory for all Indian and foreign employees' working in India.

==== Unified Pension System for Civil Servants ====
The unified pension system is a pension system for civil servants in India, that replaces the defined-benefit, unfunded, Old Pension Scheme. In the unified pension system, a civil servant contributes 10% of their salary while the government contributes 18% each month on their behalf. After retirement, the civil servant receives 50% of their basic pay of the average of the last 12 months preceding retirement. The pension is indexed to inflation and increases every year.

==== Public Provident Fund ====
The Public Provident Fund (PPF) is a voluntary savings-tax-reduction social security instrument in India, introduced by the National Savings Institute of the Ministry of Finance in 1968. The scheme's main objective is to mobilize small savings for social security during uncertain times by offering an investment with reasonable returns combined with income tax benefits. The scheme is offered by the Central Government. Balance in the PPF account is not subject to attachment under any order or decree of court under the Government Savings Banks Act, 1873. The 2019 Public Provident Fund Scheme, introduced by the Government on 12 December 2019, resulted in the rescinding of the earlier 1968 Public Provident Fund Scheme. The minimum yearly contribution is Rs 500 and the yearly returns is guaranteed at 7.1%. One can withdraw the entire amount after 15 years or partially before anytime in case of social causes such as unemployment.

==== National Pension System ====
This is thought to eventually become the national pension system of India which initially started to replace the civil servant's pension system. Civil Servants who joined service before 2004 are entitled to the Civil Service Pension Scheme and the General Provident Fund. These were established in 1972 and 1981 respectively. It was a defined benefit system that the employees did not contribute to and the pension was funded through the general state budget. To qualify for a pension, one must have been in service for at least ten years and the pensionable age was 58. The retired employee received 50% of his/her last salary as the monthly pension. Due to the severe financial burden that this system was placing on government finances that it was abolished for new civil service employees from the year 2004 and replaced by the National Pension System.

The National Pension System (NPS) is a defined contribution pension system administered and regulated by the Pension Fund Regulatory and Development Authority (PFRDA), created by an Act of the Parliament of India. The NPS started with the decision of the Government of India to stop defined benefit pensions Old Pension Scheme (OPS) for all its employees who joined after 1 January 2004.

The employee contributes 10% of his gross salary to the system while the employer contributes a matching amount. At the official age of retirement, the employee can withdraw 60% of the amount as a lump sum while 40% needs to be compulsorily used to buy annuity that will be used to pay a monthly pension. The system tries to achieve a target of 50% of the last salary of the employee. This system has been made compulsory for all civil servants but voluntary for others. In the General Provident Fund Scheme, the employee needs to contribute at least 6% of his gross salary and there is a guaranteed return of 8%. The employee can withdraw the lump sum amount when he/she retires.

==== Employees' Provident Fund Organisation ====
It is the most important social security body that covers most employees in India and accords them with social protection and is governed by The Code on Social Security, 2020. It runs three social security schemes for workers and employees in India. A provident fund is a kind of retirement scheme. It is mandatory for every private and self-employee (civil servants are covered by the Civil Servant's Pension System) under The Employees' Provident Funds and Miscellaneous Provisions Act, 1952.

Under this statutory act, an employee contributes 12% of his or her monthly salary and his or her employer contributes a matching amount, while the government contributes 1% of the employees’ salary, with a total contribution of 25% of the employee's gross salary. The contributions go towards three social security schemes: the mandatory provident fund, a pension scheme and a disability and life insurance. The entire 12% contribution of the employee goes towards the Employees’ Provident Fund Scheme (EPF), while from the employer's share of 12%, 3.67% goes to the Employees’ Provident Fund and 8.33% goes towards the Employees’ Pension Scheme (EPS) along with 1% contribution of the government while 0.5% contribution of the employer goes to the Employees’ Deposit-Linked Insurance (EDLI).

Employees affiliated to this body are also covered automatically by the National Health Protection Scheme health insurance. The employee withdraws the amount deposited for the provident fund along with the interest accumulated once the employee reaches the statutory retirement age. In case of death or disability during work, the dependent or the disabled employee gets a monthly pension throughout their life. The pension schemes guarantees a basic minimum pension for the employees life after retirement. Retirement age currently stands at 60 in all establishments covered by the EPFO. Overall, the system tries achieving 50% of the employee's last salary.

==== Employees' State Insurance ====
Employees' State Insurance (abbreviated as ESI) is a social security and health insurance fund for Indian workers. The fund is managed by the Employees' State Insurance Corporation (ESIC) according to rules and regulations stipulated in the ESI Act 1948. This fund is managed by the ESI Corporation (ESIC) according to rules and regulations stipulated there in the ESI Act 1948, which oversees the provision of healthcare and cash benefits to the employees and their family. ESIC is a Statutory and an Autonomous Body under the Ministry of Labour and Employment.

For all employees earning ₹21,000 (US$220) or less per month as wages, the employer contributes 3.25% and the employee contributes 0.75%, total share 4%. ESI scheme is a type of social security scheme for employees in the organised sector. The employees registered under the insurance are entitled to medical treatment for themselves and their dependents, unemployment benefit, sick pay and maternity benefit in case of women employees.

In case of employment-related disablement or death, there is provision for a disablement benefit and a family pension respectively. Outpatient medical facilities are available in 1418 ESI dispensaries and through 1,678 registered medical practitioners. Inpatient care is available in 145 ESI hospitals and 42 hospital annexes with a total of 19,387 beds. In addition, several state government hospitals also have beds for the exclusive use of ESI Beneficiaries. Cash benefits can be availed in any of 830 ESI centres throughout India.

==== National Health Protection Scheme ====
People working in the organised sector either get health insurance through the Ayushman Bharat Yojana or the Employees' State Insurance. Ayushman Bharat Yojana also provides coverage to the poor and people working in the unorganised sector. These two are public health insurance funds that has coverage that includes 3 days of pre-hospitalisation and 15 days of post-hospitalisation expenses. Around 1,400 procedures with all related costs like OT expenses are taken care of.

This public health insurance is fully tax-payer funded and the entire premium is borne by the centre and the states in a 60:40 share. The program is estimated to cost the government ₹99,000 crore (US$10 billion) by 2026, highlighting one of the few social security scheme that is not undergoing a budget cut. PMJAY and the E-card provide a coverage of ₹5 lakh ($6860) per family, per year, thus helping the economically vulnerable obtain easy access to healthcare services for free.

==== Atal Pension Yojna (APY) ====
It is a voluntary basic supplementary pension scheme, mostly intended for people surviving on mini-jobs, short-terms contracts or daily-wage earners. It is open to all saving bank/post office saving bank account holders in the age group of 18 to 40 years and the contributions differ, based on pension amount chosen. Subscribers would receive the guaranteed minimum monthly pension of ₹1,000 or ₹2,000 or ₹3,000 or ₹4,000 or ₹5,000 at the age of 60 years.

Under APY, the monthly pension would be available to the subscriber, and after him to his spouse and after their death, the pension corpus, as accumulated at age 60 of the subscriber, would be returned to the nominee of the subscriber. The minimum pension would be guaranteed by the Government, i.e., if the accumulated corpus based on contributions earns a lower than estimated return on investment and is inadequate to provide the minimum guaranteed pension, the Central Government would fund such inadequacy from the general budget. Alternatively, if the returns on investment are higher, the subscribers would get enhanced pensionary benefits.

==== Maternity Benefits ====
According to The Code on Social Security, 2020, all women employees are entitled to 26 weeks of fully paid maternity leaves. This benefit could be availed by women for a period extending up to a maximum of eight weeks before the expected delivery date and the remaining time can be availed after childbirth. For women who are having two or more surviving children, the duration of paid maternity leave shall be 12 weeks (i.e. six weeks before and six weeks after expected date of delivery). Maternity leave of 12 weeks to be available to mothers adopting a child below the age of three months from the date of adoption as well as to the "commissioning mothers" (defined as a biological mother who uses her egg to create an embryo planted in any other woman).

A woman needs to work and contribute for at least 80 days in the years when she plans on availing this benefit. This social security measure is fully-funded by the employer and mandatory for all establishments operating in India.

==== Accident Assurance Scheme ====
Pradhan Mantri Suraksha Bima Yojana is available to people (Indian Resident or NRI) between 18 and 70 years of age with bank accounts. It has an annual premium of ₹12 (12¢ US) exclusive of taxes. The GST is exempted on Pradhan Mantri Suraksha Bima Yojana. The amount is automatically debited from the account. This insurance scheme can have one year cover from 1 June to 31 May and would be offered through banks and administered through public sector general insurance companies.

In case of unexpected death or full disability, the payment to the nominee will be ₹2 lakh (US$2,100) and in case of partial Permanent disability ₹1 lakh (US$1,000). Full disability has been defined as loss of use in both eyes, hands or feet. Partial Permanent disability has been defined as loss of use in one eye, hand or foot. Further, death due to suicide, alcohol, drug abuse, etc. are not covered.

=== Social Assistance and Grants ===
These are rights-based social assistance programmes funded through the general taxation and have statutory backing.

==== National Food Security Safety Net ====
The National Food Security Safety Net is one of the most comprehensive food security program and the most expensive social benefit program in the world amongst all developing countries. It aims to provide subsidized food grains to approximately two thirds of the country's 1.2 billion people. It was signed into law on 12 September 2013, retroactive to 5 July 2013.

The National Food Security Act, 2013 (NFSA 2013) converts into legal entitlements for existing food security programmes of the Government of India. It includes the Midday Meal Scheme, Integrated Child Development Services scheme and the Public Distribution System. Further, the NFSA 2013 recognizes maternity entitlements. The Midday Meal Scheme and the Integrated Child Development Services Scheme are universal in nature whereas the PDS will reach about two-thirds of the population (75% in rural areas and 50% in urban areas).

Under the provisions of the bill, beneficiaries of the Public Distribution System (or, PDS) are entitled to 5 kilograms (11 lb) per person per month of cereals at the following prices:

- Rice at ₹3 (3.1¢ US) per kg
- Wheat at ₹2 (2.1¢ US) per kg
- Coarse grains (millet) at ₹1 (1.0¢ US) per kg.

In addition to grains and cereals, 2 kg of protein-rich high quality lentils and pulses are also provided for free to per person per month. Pregnant women, lactating mothers, and certain categories of children are eligible for daily free cereals. In 2022, the general government (centre and states combined) spent about 6.3% of its budget on this programme with a total allocation of ₹530,000 crore (US$55 billion). In the absence of the availability of food grains with the government, the beneficiaries under the act receives food security allowance benefits directly into their bank accounts.

==== Free School Meals ====
The Midday-Meal is a school meal programme of the Government of India designed to better the nutritional standing of school-age children nationwide and is governed by the statutory act National Food Security Act, 2013. The programme supplies free lunches on working days for children in primary and upper primary classes in government, government aided, local body, Education Guarantee Scheme, and alternate innovative education centres, madrasa and maqtabs supported under Sarva Shiksha Abhiyan, and National Child Labour Project schools run by the ministry of labour. Serving 120,000,000 children in over 1,265,000 schools and Education Guarantee Scheme centres, it is the largest of its kind in the world.

Under article 24, paragraph 2c of the Convention on the Rights of the Child, to which India is a party, India has committed to yielding "adequate nutritious food" for children. The programme has undergone many changes since its launch in 1995. The Midday Meal Scheme is covered by the National Food Security Act, 2013. The legal backing to the Indian school meal programme is akin to the legal backing provided in the US through the National School Lunch Act.

==== Pradhan Mantri Awas Yojana (Gramin and Urban) ====
This is India's flagship assistance for housing designed specifically to reduce rural and urban homelessness and poverty. Under the scheme, financial assistance worth ₹420,000 (US$4,400) in plain areas and ₹530,000 (US$5,500) in difficult areas (high land area) is provided for construction or upgradation of houses for low income groups and retirees. The Central Government, which covers 60% of the cost, allocated a budget of ₹48,000 crore (US$5.0 billion) for both rural and urban regions. The states are supposed to cover the remaining 40%.

These houses are equipped with facilities such as a toilet, LPG cooking gas connections, electricity connection, and piped drinking water in convergence with other schemes e.g. Swachh Bharat Abhiyan toilets, Ujjwala Yojana LPG gas connection, Saubhagya Yojana electricity connection, etc. The houses are allotted in the name of the woman or jointly between husband and wife.

==== Maternity Benefit for Self-employed or Unemployed Women ====
Pradhan Mantri Matri Vandana Yojana is a maternity benefit programme run by the government of India for low-income households. It was introduced in 2017 and is implemented by the Ministry of Women and Child Development. It is a conditional cash transfer scheme for pregnant and lactating women of 19 years of age or above for the first live birth. It provides a partial wage compensation to women for wage-loss during childbirth and childcare and to provide conditions for safe delivery and good nutrition and feeding practices.

In 2013, the scheme was brought under the National Food Security Act, 2013 to implement the provision of cash maternity benefit of ₹6,000 (US$62) stated in the Act. The eligible beneficiaries would receive the incentive given under the Janani Suraksha Yojana (JSY) for Institutional delivery and the incentive received under JSY would be accounted towards maternity benefits so that on an average a woman gets ₹6,000 (US$62). The total financial cost of this benefit (both the centre and states together) was ₹2,475.89 crore (US$260 million) in 2020, highlighting steady cuts in budgetary allocation over the years.

==== Integrated Child Development Services ====
It is a government programme in India which provides food, preschool education, primary healthcare, cash transfers to families, immunization, health check-up and referral services to children under 6 years of age and their mothers. The scheme was launched in 1975, discontinued in 1978 by the government of Morarji Desai, and then relaunched by the Tenth Five Year Plan.

Tenth five-year plan also linked ICDS to Anganwadi centres established mainly in rural areas and staffed with frontline workers. In addition to fighting malnutrition and ill health, the programme is also intended to combat gender inequality by providing girls the same resources as boys.

During the 2018–19 fiscal year, the Indian central government allocated ₹16,335 crores ($2.18 billion) to the programme. The widespread network of ICDS has an important role in combating rural malnutrition especially for children of weaker and marginalised groups.

==== National Rural Employment Guarantee Scheme ====
National Rural Employment Guarantee Act, 2005, is a social welfare measure that aims to guarantee the 'right to work'. It is considered to be one of the world's largest public work programs. This act was passed in September 2005 under the UPA government of Prime Minister Dr. Manmohan Singh. It aims to enhance livelihood security in rural areas by providing at least 100 days of wage employment in a financial year to every household whose adult members volunteer to do unskilled manual work. As of 2021, the government allocated ₹73,000 crore (US$7.6 billion) for this scheme. Together with the central and state governments, the net allocation was ₹201,666 crore (US$21 billion) in 2021, a massive increase from the budgeted estimate in order to counter the economic loss caused by the COVID-19 lockdown. In 2023, the program's budget has been slashed by the centre to ₹60,000 crore (US$6.2 billion).

==== National Social Assistance Scheme ====
The National Social Assistance Programme is a Centrally Sponsored Scheme of the Government of India that provides solidarity financial benefits to elderly people who were unable to work and has no other pension rights, widows/widowers who's left without the family breadwinner and persons with disabilities in the form of social pensions. As of 2023, there are more than 29 million NSAP beneficiaries in India. The central government's allocation to the NSAP budget (which forms 60% of the expenditure on this scheme) is ₹9,636 crore (US$1.0 billion) in 2023, highlighting constant cuts to the budget over the years.

== Welfare measures in various states ==
Below are some of the measures undertaken at the state level for social security and welfare purposes in India.

=== West Bengal ===
Kanyashree Prakalpa (Bengali: কন্যাশ্রী) is an initiative taken by the Government of West Bengal to improve the life and the status of the girls, by helping economically backward families with cash so the families do not arrange the marriage of their girl child before 18 years because of economic problems. The purpose of this initiative is to uplift those girls who are from poor families and thus can't pursue higher studies due to tough economic conditions. It has been given international recognition by the United Nations Department of International Development and the UNICEF.

The scheme has two conditional cash benefit components:

1. The first is K1, an annual scholarship of ₹1,000/- to be paid annually to the girls from 13 to 18 years of age group for every year that they remain in education, provided they are unmarried at the time. Originally, in 2013–14 and 2014–15, the annual scholarship was ₹500/-.
2. The second benefit is K2, a one-time grant of 25,000/-, to be paid when girls turn 18, provided that they are engaged in an academic or occupations pursuit and are unmarried at the time.

The term 'education' encompasses secondary and higher secondary education, as well as the various vocational, technical and sports courses available for this age group. Although the annual scholarship is payable only when girls reach Class VIII, this criterion is waived for girls with special needs whose disability is 40% or more.

Recently, the bar of income has been withdrawn by the State Government, thus every girl can apply for this scheme. The scheme was previously only open to families whose annual income was equal to or less than ₹1.2 lakh (US$1,200), but girls with special needs, i.e. girls who have lost both parents, as well as for girls residing in Juvenile Justice homes, had this criterion waived.

=== Tamil Nadu ===
Amma Unavagam (Tamil: அம்மா உணவகம்) is a food subsidisation programme run by the Government of Tamil Nadu in India. It is a first of the kind scheme run by any government in India. It has been an inspiration for many states like Odisha, Karnataka and Andhra Pradesh which later proposed similar schemes seeing its success.

Under the scheme, municipal corporations of the state-run canteens serving subsidised food at low prices. The genesis of the scheme could be traced to the concept of rural restaurants promoted by Nimbkar Agricultural Research Institute. The literal meaning of the name of the scheme Amma Unavagam is Mother's canteen. Amma translates to mother in Tamil, but is also a reference to Chief Minister J Jayalalithaa, who introduced this restaurant chain as part of government schemes aimed at aiding economically disadvantaged sections of society.

== See also ==
- Welfare State
- Welfare reform
- Pensions in India
- Only 15 paise reaches the beneficiary
- Social safety net
- Social security
- Social policy
- Unemployment benefits

=== Comparisons ===
- American social programs
  - U.S. Social Security
- Australian social security
- Social programs in Canada
- Italian welfare
- New Zealand welfare
- Scandinavian welfare model
  - Swedish welfare
  - Swedish social security
  - Finnish welfare
- UK welfare
