= Ulagampatti =

- Village
- Location in Tamil Nadu, India Ulagampatti (India)
- Coordinates: 10.322211764923665°N 78.50730112877233°E
- Country: India
- State: Tamil Nadu
- District: Sivaganga district

Government
  - Body: Ulagamapatti Panchayat Union

Population
  - Total: 3,506 (as of 2,011)

Languages
  - Official: Tamil
- Time zone: UTC+5:30 (IST)
- PIN: 630410
- Telephone code: 04577
- Vehicle registration: TN-63
- Lok Sabha constituency: Sivaganga
- Civic agency: Ulagamapatti Panchayat Union
- Avg. summer temperature: 35 °C (95 °F)
- Avg. winter temperature: 22 °C (72 °F)

Ulagampatti is a village located in S Pudur (Semmampatti Pudur) Panchayat Union of Singampunari Taluk in Sivagangai District, Tamil Nadu State, India.

== Location ==
The nearest town is Ponnamaravathi, located 8 kilometres (5.0 mi) away. The nearest railway station is Manapparai, located 50.5 kilometres (31.4 mi) away. Nearest fire service station is at Ponnamaravathi. The nearest international airport is Tiruchirappalli International Airport.

Ulagampatti village has facilities including a bank, Lord Siva, Murugan Temple (Ulaganatha Swami Temple, Murugan Gnaniyar Madam), elementary school and High School.

The PIN code is 630410.

Temples in Ulagampatti include:

- Ulaganatha Swami Temple (one of the oldest temples)
- Gyaniyar Madam
- Anjaneyar/Hanuman Temple
- Nambaiyya Temple
- Pillaiyar Temple
- Ulagampatti Shirdi Sai Baba Temple
- Perumal Temple
- Kumaraiya Temple

It is also called the village of Nagarathars due to the majority Nagarathar population.

== Transportation ==
Ulagampatti is well connected by roadways. The Tamil Nadu State Transport Corporation (TNSTC) and private companies operate frequent bus services between Ulagampatti and Ponnamaravathi (8 km), Thuvarankurichi (19 km), Singampunari (24 km), Kottampatti (26 km) Tiruchirappalli (71 km), Madurai (81 KM), Dindigul (77 Km), Coimbatore (232 km) and Rameswaram (190 km).

== Facilities ==
- Ulagampatti Police Station and Police Government Staff residences
- Ponnamaravathi nearest Fire Station
- Ulagampatti Indian Bank with ATM, Immediate Payment Service facility and Western Union Money Transfer
- Ulagampatti Post Office (with Speed Post)
- Government Village Office (VO)
- Ulagampatti Government Higher Secondary School
- Ulagampatti Village Library

== Telecommunications network ==
Currently 4G LTE Services works at a acceptable level in Ulagampatti from the service providers like JIO, Airtel India, Vodafone India. Only 2G, 3G services are from BSNL. Landline telephone using 2 wire copper network PSTN and FAX services are provided by BSNL.

04577 is the STD code of the telephone lines for Ulagampatti village (Tirupathur region).

== Cable & Satellite television ==
Digital Cable TV services are provided currently using CoAxial cables in the village by private players. Direct to home satellite television is also used for receiving both government DD Free Dish and private run TV channels.

== Police services ==
Ulagampatti falls under the Thiruppathur Sub Division of Sivagangai district. Ulagampatti also has the Government Staff residences for the Tamil nadu police department staff.

== Ulagampatti postal services ==
Ulagampatti is a sub-post office (S.O) of the India Post and supports the following neighbouring branch (B.O) post offices:

- Ulagampatti S.O & Padaminchi
- Kattukudipatti B.O
- Kilavayal B.O
- Mandakudipatti B.O
- Neduvayal B.O
- Tiruvalandur B.O
- V. Pudur B.O
- Varapur B.O.

The PIN code of Ulagampatti is 630410.

Intra Circle Hub for Ulagampatti village is Karaikudi ICH of the Indian Postal System located in Karaikudi, Tamil Nadu. It serves as a sorting and distribution center for mail, specifically for the Sivaganga and Ramanathapuram districts. Karaikudi acts as the headquarters for the Postal Sorting District of the Madurai Sub-Zonal postal region, managing mail for both districts after receiving it from Madurai.

Other services provided at ulagampatti post office include:

- Post boxes and post bags for mail receipt
- Speed Post
- Identity cards for proof of residence
- Post office Passport Seva Kendras (POPSK)
- Western Union
- Postal Life Insurance and Rural Postal Life Insurance
- Savings Bank (SB/RD/TD/MIS/SCSS/PPF/SSA)
- Savings Cash Certificates
- India Post Payments Bank (IPPB)
- Stamp Sales

Banking facilities provided by the ulagampatti post office are savings plans, including recurring deposit accounts, Sukanya Samriddhi Account (SSA) is also known as Sukanya Samriddhi Yojana (SSY), National Savings Certificates (NSC), Kisan Vikas Patra (KVP), the Public Provident Fund, savings-bank accounts, monthly-income plans, senior-citizen's savings plans and time-deposit accounts.

== Electrical power distribution ==
Electrical power distribution to ulagampatti village is provided by Tamil Nadu Power Distribution Corporation Limited. Ulagampatti falls under the Madurai region, Section 486 (Semmampatti Pudur - S Pudur) with distribution number 008 for the ulagampatti village.

- Region code: 05 ( Madurai ), Circle code: 460 (Sivaganga)
- Section code: 486 ( S Pudur )
- Distribution code: 008 ( Ulagampatti )

Electricity Consumer number of every household in ulagampatti will have 05-486-008-xxxx as their electricity consumer number.

- The region code is 2 digits.
- The section code is 3 digits.
- The distribution code is 3 digits.
- Service number is 4 digits (User number, that identifies the house)

== Economy ==
The main economic activity in Ulagampatti is agriculture. There is not much industrial activity in the village. There is a small-scale rice milling factory located near the post office. Road facilities of Ulagampatti are connected to the national highways for ease of access.

== See also ==
- Ponnamaravathi
- S Pudur (Semmampatti Pudur)
- Piranmalai
- Singampunari Taluk
- Tiruppattur
