= Income declaration scheme, 2016 =

Indian tax evasion amnesty scheme

Income declaration scheme, 2016 was an amnesty scheme introduced by Narendra Modi led Government of India as a part of the 2016 Union budget to unearth black money and bring it back into the system. Lasting from 1 June to 30 September, the scheme provided an opportunity to income tax and wealth tax defaulters to avoid prosecution and become compliant by declaring their assets, paying the tax on them and a penalty of 45% thereafter.

The scheme guaranteed immunity from prosecution under the Income Tax Act, Wealth Tax Act, 1957, and the Benami Transactions (Prohibition) Act, 1988 and also ensured that declarations under it would not be subject to any scrutiny or inquiry.

The Central Board of Indirect Taxes and Customs has notified the Amnesty Scheme effective 1 November 2024 and has issued the clarification on interest and penalty or both in respect of demands under section 73 of the CGST Act pertaining to financial years 2017–18, 2018–19 and 2019–20.

== Notable declarations ==
Under the Income declaration total of ₹138.6 billion (US$1.4 billion) was declared by a single individual Mahesh Shah of Ahmedabad, Gujarat.

== See also ==
- Voluntary Disclosure of Income Scheme
- Pradhan Mantri Garib Kalyan Yojana, 2016
