= Padaminchi =

Padaminchi Padamingi
- Village
- Location in Tamil Nadu, India Padaminchi (India)
- Coordinates: 10.323144°N 78.501193°E
- Country: India
- State: Tamil Nadu
- District: Sivaganga district

Government
  - Body: Ulagamapatti Panchayat Union

Languages
  - Official: Tamil
- Time zone: UTC+5:30 (IST)
- PIN: 630 410
- Telephone code: 04577
- Vehicle registration: TN-63
- Lok Sabha constituency: Sivaganga
- Civic agency: Ulagamapatti Panchayat Union
- Avg. summer temperature: 35 °C (95 °F)
- Avg. winter temperature: 22 °C (72 °F)

Padaminchi ( Padamingi / படமிஞ்சி ) is a village located in S Pudur (Semmampatti Pudur) Panchayat Union of Singampunari Taluk in Sivagangai District, Tamil Nadu State, India.

Nearest major village is Ulagampatti. The nearest town is Ponnamaravathi, located 8.5 kilometers away. The nearest railway station is Manapparai, located 50.5 kilometers away.

Indian Postal service is provided by the Ulagampatti post office. Pin code: 630410.
