= Naganathaswamy Temple, Peraiyur =

Shiva temple in Tamil Nadu, India

Naganathaswamy Temple is a Siva temple in Peraiyur in Pudukkottai district in Tamil Nadu (India).

== Location ==
This temple is located in Pudukkottai-Ponnamaravathi road, at a distance of 12 km. from Pudukkottai. This is one of the important temples devoted to Nāga.

== Presiding deity ==
As Naga worshipped the presiding deity it is known as Naganathaswamy. The Goddess is known as Prahathambal. This place is known as Shenbagavanam and Girikshetram. In the kosta of the presiding deity, Annamalaiyar, Brahma, Gajalakshmi and Subramania are found. In the north prakara shrines of Chandikesvarar and Durga are found.

== Nagaraja worship ==
In the temple campus, granite Nāgas donated by the devotees, measuring to from 6" to 2' height are found. Such donated Nāgas are also set up in the compound wall of the temple. Naga worship, starts from the worship of Nature. In this temple, Kumbhabhishekhams were held in 1865, 1977 and 1989.

== Inscriptions ==
Inscriptions pertaining to Rajendra Chola (1012-1044 CE) are found in this temple. Inscription of Cholas, Pandyas, Vijayanaga, Tondaimans of Arantangi and Pudukkottai are also found in this temple.

== Festival ==
During Adippuram for Goddess and during Panguni Chittirai for the presiding deity flag hoisting is held in a grand manner. Car festival is held in this temple.

== Another Shiva temple ==
There is also another Shiva temple in Peraiyur, known as Devanathaswamy Temple, one of the shrines of the Vaippu Sthalams sung by Tamil Saivite Nayanar Sundarar.
