= Muthumariamman Temple, Konnaiyur =

Hindu temple in Tamil Nadu, India

Muthumariamman Temple is situated at Konnaiyur in Pudukkottai district in Tamil Nadu, India.

== Location ==
This temple is located at Pudukkottai-Ponnamaravathi road at a distance of 35 km from Pudukkottai. As there were many kondrai trees this place was called earlier as 'Kondraiyur' and now as Konnaiyur.

== Presiding deity ==
The presiding deity of the temple is Muthumariamman. The temple tree is Nelli tree.

== Festivals ==
During Tamil month of Aadi, Amavasai, Tamil New Year day and during Tamil month of Panguni, starting from the first Sunday Festival and showering of flowers are held. Pujas are held three times daily at Kalasanthi, Uttchikkalam and Sayaratchai. People in and around the area come here One of the festivals held in Panguni is known as 'Nadu Selutthuthal Vizha'. During the festival devotees belonging to four different 'nadu' of this area come here with large sticks carrying and spear. They would come on foot. Especially people of Alavayal area, in order to offer the deity, would come there smearing their body with mud.

== Worship time ==
The temple is opened for worship from 6.30 to 1.00 a.m. and 3.00 to 8.00 p.m. Kumbhabhishekham of this temple was held in September 2019.
