= 2023 Union budget of India =

Government budget

2023 Union Budget of India
- Emblem of India
- Submitted by: Minister of Finance
- Submitted to: Parliament of India
- Presented: 1 February 2023
- Country: India
- Parliament: 17th (Lok Sabha)
- Party: Bharatiya Janata Party
- Finance minister: Nirmala Sitharaman
- Total revenue: ▲₹35.02 trillion (US$370 billion) (in 2023)
- Total expenditures: ▲₹45.03 trillion (US$470 billion) (in 2023)
- Tax cuts: None
- Deficit: 5.9% ▼(0.5%) (in 2023)
- Website: www.indiabudget.gov.in

The 2023 Union Budget of India was presented by the Minister of Finance of India on February 1, 2023. This was the fourth budget of Narendra Modi-led NDA government's second term, starting from 2020. The Economic Survey for 2022–2023 was released on January 31, 2023 before the budget.

== History ==
The Union Budget is the annual financial report of India; an estimate of income and expenditure of the government on a periodical basis. As per Article 112 of the Indian Constitution, it is a compulsory task of the government. The first budget of India was presented on April 7 1860 by Scotsman James Wilson. The first Union Budget of Independent India was presented by RK Shanmukham Chetty on 26 November 1947.

While presenting the 2023 Union Budget, Finance Minister Nirmala Sitharaman said in her speech: "This Budget lays a futuristic 'Amrit Kaal' for women, youth and marginalised communities, big public investment for infrastructure guided by PM Gati Shakti, productivity enhancement, energy transition and climate action and financing of investments."

=== New tax slab ===
New slabs under New Tax Regimes for individual

- ₹0-3 lakh : Nil
- ₹3-6 lakhs: 5%
- ₹6-9 lakhs: 10%
- ₹9-12 lakhs: 15%
- ₹12-15 lakhs: 20%
- Over ₹15 lakhs: 30%

== Reactions ==
=== Political ===
Akhilesh Yadav, president of the Samajwadi Party, said that the budget proposed by the BJP government actually makes things worse, such as unemployment and inflation. He further added that the BJP has never cared about the interests of regular people and will not do so in the foreseeable future either.

Mamata Banerjee, the Chief Minister of West Bengal, criticised the Union Budget 2023-2024, calling it "anti-people" and "totally opportunistic."

=== Business ===
Sanjiv Mehta, chairman and managing director of Hindustan Unilever Limited said, "The provision that you will get a tax reduction only if you pay being on cash basis, is really good for the industry."

Sanjiv Bajaj, the chairman and managing director of Bajaj Finserv and the current chairman of Confederation of Indian Industry said, "The government managed a tough balancing act of meeting the priorities of growth through capital spending while keeping a fiscal deficit under check. While at the same time very strong focus on inclusion to ensure prosperity for the masses."

Sajjan Jindal, the chairman of JSW Group said, "This govt has been giving a huge push to the infrastructure upgradation of our nation & an increase in spending on road & rail infrastructure is a testament to their philosophy. This will help maintain the momentum of our economic growth, contrary to the world scenario."

V. Vaidyanathan, the managing director and CEO of IDFC First Bank called it "a natural progression of the previous Budgets in terms of direction, consistency, and the overarching growth objective."

Amitabh Chaudhry, the managing director and CEO of Axis Bank wrote in The Economic Times, "The budget grasped the opportunity to consolidate India's macroeconomic fundamentals. Even as developed economies slow down in 2023, India is likely to remain a bright spot, with falling inflation and robust growth. The prudence demonstrated over the past couple of years by the budgets - in conjunction with a finely tuned monetary policy - has helped India's economy emerge relatively unscathed despite a series of public health and economic shocks."

=== Stock markets ===
After the 2023 budget was announced, the Indian stock markets stayed very unstable. The BSE SENSEX went up more than 1100 points during the day before falling by 1% at the end of the day. Despite this, it still managed to end the day with a slight gain. On the other side, the NSE NIFTY 500 closed in the red for the session, with index heavyweight Adani Enterprises being the primary contributor to the NIFTY's decline.

== See also ==
2024 Union budget of India
