= Pensions in India =

The Indian pension system consists of three major pillars: the National Social Assistance Programme (NSAP) for the elderly and poor, the civil servants pension, and the mandatory defined contribution retirement programs run by the Employees' Provident Fund Organisation of India for private sector employees and employees of state owned companies.

== Non-contributory minimum pension ==
The National Social Assistance Scheme is a limited social safety net for the elderly poor and disabled who falls under the official poverty line. It is a non-contributory pension introduced in 1995. It is targeted at people between 60 and 65 years old who have not been in paid work either for health reasons or because they were carers. To be eligible, one must be above the age of 60 and below the poverty line. It is funded through the general taxation.

== National Pension System ==
Civil servants who joined before 2004 are entitled to the Civil Service Pension Scheme and the General Provident Fund, stablished in 1972 and 1981 respectively. It was a defined benefit system that the employees did not contribute to and the pension was funded through the general state budget. To qualify for a pension, one must have been in service for at least ten years and the pensionable age was 58. The retired employee received 50% of his/her last salary as the monthly pension. Due to the severe financial burden that this system was placing on government finances that it was abolished for new civil service employees from the year 2004 and replaced by the National Pension System. The National Pension System (NPS) is a defined contribution pension system administered and regulated by the Pension Fund Regulatory and Development Authority (PFRDA), created by an Act of the Parliament of India. The NPS started with the decision of the Government of India to stop defined benefit pensions, Old Pension Scheme (OPS) for all its employees who joined after 1 January 2004. The employee contributes 10% of their gross salary to the system while the employer contributes a matching amount. At the official age of retirement, the employee can withdraw 60% of the amount as a lump sum while 40% needs to be compulsorily used to buy annuity that will be used to pay a monthly pension. The system tries to achieve a target of 50% of the last salary of the employee. This system has been made compulsory for all civil servants but voluntary for others. In the General Provident Fund Scheme, the employee needs to contribute at least 6% of his gross salary and there is a guaranteed return of 8%. The employee can withdraw the lump sum amount when he/she retires.

== Mandatory state provident fund and pension provision ==
This mandatory scheme is part of the Social Security system in India that covers all employees of the private sector and employees of state owned companies. It is run by the social security body Employees' Provident Fund Organisation (EPFO). In this system, an employee contributes 10% to 12% of his monthly salary here and his employer contributes a matching amount, with a total contribution of 20% to 24% of the employee's gross salary, while the state contributes an additional 1.16%, which makes it a total of 25.16% of the employee's gross salary. The contributions go towards the mandatory provident fund, the mandatory pension scheme and a mandatory disability and life insurance scheme. The employee withdraws the lump-sum amount deposited for the provident fund along with the interest accumulated once the employee reaches the statutory retirement age. In case of death or permanent disability during work, the dependent gets a monthly pension throughout their life. Most retired employees buys lifetime annuity or pension plan with the lump-sum amount from state-owned banks or insurance companies which provides them with a monthly pension amount that's close to 50% of their last salary for a lifetime.

== Voluntary Schemes ==
Government of India launched Pradhan Mantri Shram Yogi Maan-Dhan (PMSYM) in February 2019 to provide an assured pension of ₹3,000 (US$31) per month to unorganised workers. Several private companies additionally provides private pension plans for their employees which are voluntary.

== See also ==
- Social Security in India
- Pension
- Indian labor law
