= Puluthipatti =

Village in Tamil Nadu, India

- village
- Location in Tamil Nadu, India Puluthipatti (India)
- Coordinates: 10.311°N 78.389°E
- Country: India
- State: Tamil Nadu
- District: Sivaganga district

Languages
  - Official: Tamil
- Time zone: UTC+5:30 (IST)

Puluthipatti village gram Panchayat is located in the S. Pudur (Semmampatti Pudur) Panchayat Union of Sivaganga district, Tamil Nadu. This panchayat falls under the Tiruppattur Assembly Constituency and the Sivaganga Lok Sabha Constituency. The panchayat comprises a total of 7 ward divisions, from which 7 ward members are elected.

According to the 2011 Indian Census, the total population is 1,718, consisting of 901 females and 817 males.

== See also ==
- Ulagampatti
