= Social security contribution =

Social security contribution may refer to:

- Social security in Australia
- Social security in India
- The Social Security Contributions and Benefits Act 1992 in the United Kingdom
- Social Security in the United States
