= Pradhan Mantri Garib Kalyan Yojana =

Scheme launched by the Narendra Modi led Government of India

Pradhan Mantri Garib Kalyan Yojana, 2016 (PMGKY) (English, Prime Minister's Poor welfare scheme) is a scheme launched by the Narendra Modi led Government of India in December 2016 on the lines of the Income declaration scheme, 2016 (IDS) launched earlier in the year. A part of the Taxation Laws (Second Amendment) Act, 2016, the scheme provides an opportunity to declare unaccounted for wealth and black money in a confidential manner and avoid prosecution after paying a fine of 50% on the undisclosed income. An additional 25% of the undisclosed income is invested in the scheme which can be refunded after four years, without any interest.

Valid from 16 December 2016 to 31 March 2017, the scheme could only be availed to declare income in the form of cash or deposits in Indian bank accounts and not in the form of jewellery, stock, immovable property, or deposits in overseas accounts.

Not declaring undisclosed income under the PMGKY would attract a fine of 77.25% if the income is shown in tax returns. In case the income is not shown in tax returns, it will attract a further 10% penalty followed by prosecution.

== See also ==
- 2016 Indian banknote demonetisation
- Income declaration scheme, 2016
