= New Tax Regime =

New Personal Income Taxation Policy in India

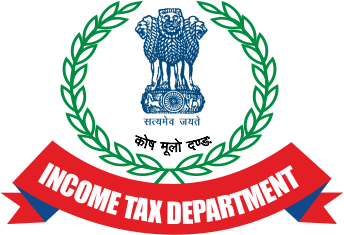
Central Board of Direct Taxes (CBDT), Department of Revenue, Ministry of Finance, Government of India.

The New Tax Regime is a scheme of Income tax in India first proposed in Union Budget 2020–21. Subsequent Budget of FY2021-22 did not see any major announcements in this regime. During the Budget 2022–23, reports emerged that New Tax Regime was getting poor response and Government is considering to make it more attractive among the taxpayers.

The latest changes were presented in the Union Budget 2023-24 which brought five significant changes in the earlier existing (FY 2022–23) income tax policy. Improved rebate, modified tax structure/slabs, reduced surcharges, higher exemption on leave encashment for retirees in private-sector and extension of standard deduction in the New Tax Regime were announced by the Finance Minister, Nirmala Sitharaman during Parliament's Budget Session on 1 February 2023.

== Background ==
Grappling with significant income disparities, India appeared to be prompting the policy regime to prioritize the expansion of the taxpayer base and incentivize new taxpayers to contribute to the national treasury. As per data released by the Income Tax Department, a mere 3.8% of individuals aged over 20 in India paid income tax in the financial year 2018-19.

== Introduction in FY20-21 ==
The notion that millennial generation exhibit a proclivity towards spending rather than saving appears to have seemingly prompted the implementation of this New Tax Regime framework to boost consumption thereby helping combat the deceleration of economic growth during the time.

The Union Budget proposed a simplified personal income tax regime aimed at providing substantial relief to individual taxpayers and streamlining the Income-Tax law. Under this optional New Tax Regime, individual taxpayers who chose to forgo specific deductions and exemptions would benefit from significantly reduced income tax rates.

Union Minister for Finance and Corporate Affairs Nirmala Sitharaman revealed the government's intention to withdraw all Income-Tax exemptions in the long run. Individuals or HUFs opting for New Tax Regime are not entitled to exemptions for leave travel, house rent, among others under the section 115BAC of the IT Act. However, the tax breaks that will not be available under the new tax regime are deductions like those in section 80C, 80CCC, 80CCD, 80D, 80DD, 80DDB, 80E, 80EE, 80EEA, 80EEB, 80G, 80GG, 80GGA, 80GGC, 80IA, 80-IAB, 80-IAC, 80-IB, 80-IBA, etc. under Chapter VI-A of Income Tax Act.

Individuals who were at the outset of their professional journey starting anew and yet are interested in a streamlined approach found this New Tax Regime attractive. This regime appeared to provide benefits to taxpayers who reside with their parents, those who are debt-free of home loan, and those who do not have any deduction instruments under Chapter IV-A. But the majority of taxpayers who were living in rented accommodations and claiming HRA along with other deductions were not disincentivized to opt for the New Tax Regime. It was seen as deterrent for opting small saving schemes which are popular among the masses.

According to experts, taxpaying citizens might refrain from investing and instead choose to adopt a new tax regime. However, such a decision could potentially lead to the demise of their savings habit, which would be detrimental to the general populace.

== Status in FY22-23 ==
The government implemented the new tax regime with the expectation that the changes in tax brackets would occur in a gradual rather than sudden manner. Despite the simplified mechanism and reduced tax burden of the New Tax Regime, taxpayers were still choosing to opt for the old regime and took advantage of tax deductions. As per expert analysis, tax-advantaged retirement savings instruments had significant popularity among middle-class taxpayers which made the old regime look more appealing. Given the crucial role of these investments in ensuring social security, a majority of taxpayers had already subscribed them. Terminating an existing commitment such as a life insurance policy, after enrollment may prove challenging for taxpayers due to potential financial losses. Additionally, in the wake of the COVID-19 pandemic many taxpaying individuals have recognized the significance of having insurance, which is eligible for deduction in Old Tax Regime. Simultaneously, the New Tax Regime lacks provisions for deductions on such savings, thereby diminishing its appeal.

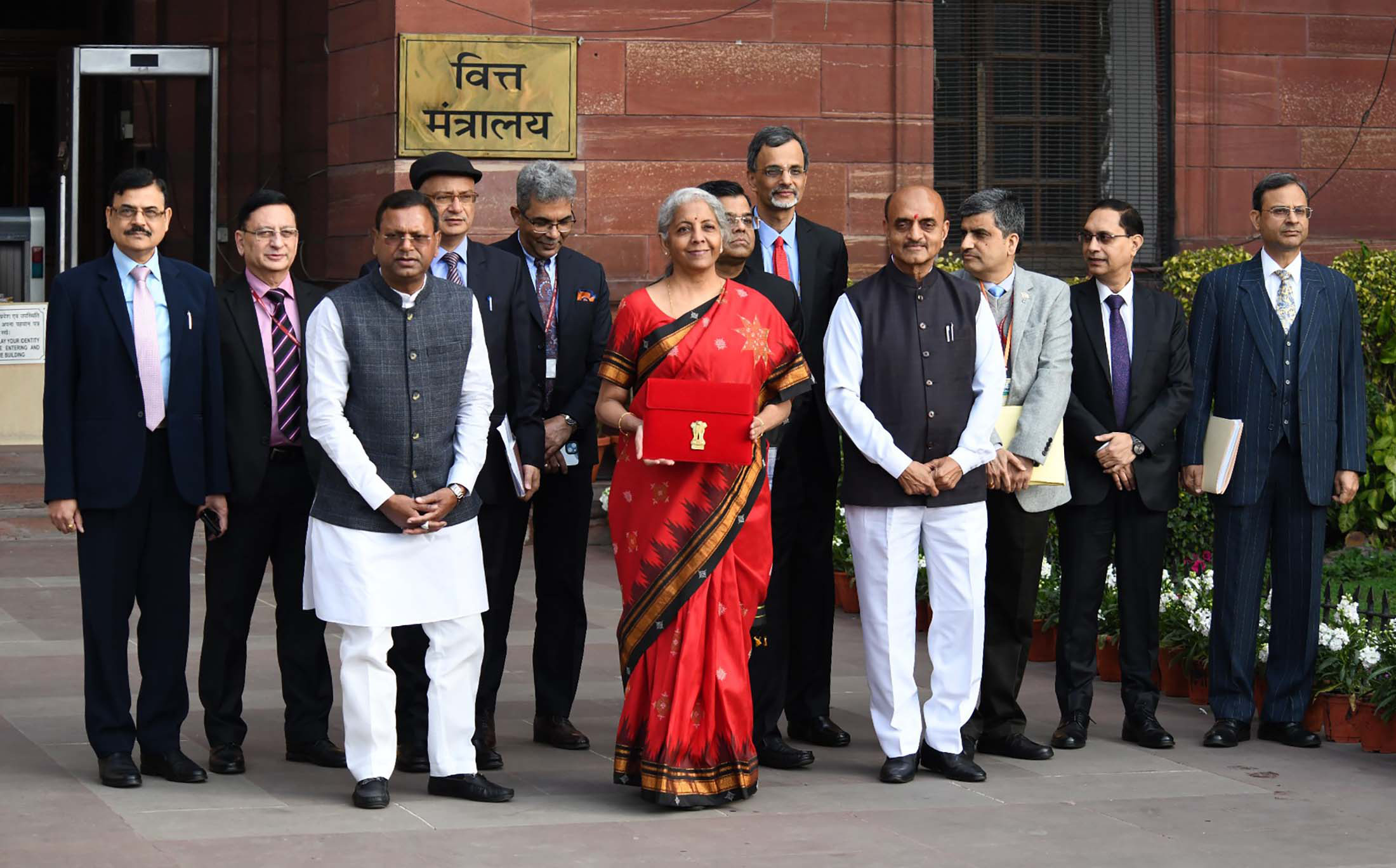
Finance Minister Nirmala Sitharaman before presenting the Union Budget 2023-24

== Proposals in FY23-24 ==
The proposed Union Budget 2023-24 budget aims to establish the New Tax Regime as the primary tax system, while still allowing the salaried-class taxpayers the choice to opt for the Old Tax Regime and its associated benefits.

=== Rebate ===
Under the Old Tax Regime, individuals earning up to ₹5 lakh were exempt from paying income tax. There is an increase in the rebate limit by ₹2 lakh within the framework of the New Tax Regime. This would effectively exempt individuals with incomes up to ₹7 lakh from any tax obligations under the new system.

=== Tax Slab ===
Individual Income Tax Slabs
Slab	Tax Rate	New Tax Regime	Old Tax Regime
1	NIL	₹0 - ₹3 lakh	₹0 - ₹2.5 lakh
2	5%	₹3 lakh - ₹7 lakh	₹2.5 lakh - ₹5 lakh
3	10%	₹7 lakh - ₹10 lakh	₹5 lakh - ₹7.5 lakh
4	15%	₹10 lakh - ₹12 lakh	₹7.5 lakh - ₹10 lakh
5	20%	₹12 lakh - ₹15 lakh	₹10 lakh - ₹12.5 lakh
6	25%	Not Applicable	₹12.5 lakh - ₹15 lakh
7	30%	₹15 lakh and Above	₹15 lakh and Above

Reducing the earlier six payable slabs for computing individual income tax to five in the New Tax Regime, the Finance Minister proposed higher threshold limit of ₹3 lakh from existing ₹2.5 lakh for taxpayers. new Slab

The implementation of improved limits in tax slabs is said to provide significant relief to taxpayers under the new regime. For instance, an individual with an annual income of ₹9 lakh will only be required to pay ₹45,000, which amounts to a mere 5% of their income. This represents a 25% reduction from the current tax liability of ₹60,000. Similarly, an individual earning ₹15 lakh will be required to pay only ₹1.5 lakh, which is equivalent to 10% of their income. This represents a 20% reduction from the existing liability of ₹1,87,500.

=== Standard Deduction ===
This proposal offers significant relief to the salaried class and pensioners, including family pensioners, through the extension of the standard deduction benefit to the new tax regime. Individual can forego ₹75,000 in total taxable income while ₹25,000 can be claimed in family pension.

=== Surcharge ===
It was proposed to cut highest surcharge rate to 25% from existing 37.5% under New Tax Regime for income exceeding ₹2 crore. This proposal would lead to a decrease in the maximum tax rate from the current 42.74% to 39%, which is one of the highest in the world. No modifications to the surcharge have been suggested for individuals who choose to remain under the old regime within this income bracket.

=== Leave Encashment for Private Sector Retirees ===
The proposed budget entails an extension of the limit of tax exemption on leave encashment to ₹25 lakh for non-government salaried employees upon retirement, aligning it with the government salaried class. In the Old Tax Regime, the maximum amount eligible for exemption stood at ₹3 lakh.

== Impact ==
=== FY 2020–21 ===
According to a report by SBI, as of 2020, only 4 percent of Indian citizens pay income tax, yet they contribute to 41 percent of the total private consumption expenditure in the country. The Finance Minister in 2020 stated implementation of New Tax Regime would have a loss of ₹40,000 crore per annum to the exchequer.

Following the implementation of the new proposals for the financial year 2020–21, tax consultants said New Tax Regime did not result in simplification as anticipated. Instead there was a need calculate individual taxes under both regimes to determine which one is more advantageous. Salaried taxpayers had the opportunity to alternate between the two regimes on an annual basis. However, those who possessed business income were restricted to a single opportunity to make such a selection. The financial markets suffered losses on the day of Budget as the high-expectations on capital market reforms were not met by the Finance Minister. Market index S&P BSE Sensex saw a dip of 988 points to close at 39,735.53 while NSE Nifty 50 was also down.

As per an analysis by the Revenue Department, 91.7% of tax filers (about 5.3 crore out of 5.78 crore tax filers) claimed a cumulative deduction (Sec 80 (C) + Sec 80 (D) + NPS + Loan Interest Repayment + Standard Deduction + others) of less than ₹2 lakh and less than 1 per cent of all tax filers (nearly 3.7 lakh) claimed deductions of over Rs 4 lakh.

While forgoing key tax exemptions results in modest increase in the disposable income of only a small section of taxpayers, the National Statistical Office (NSO) data on the decline in net savings among Indian households is at 8-year low of 6.5% of Indian GDP is alarming.

=== FY 2021–22 ===
FY2021-22 was an uneventful year for the New Tax Regime as no new changes were announced except the relaxation of Income Tax filing for senior citizens over 75 years.

The government's tax policy for the near future was clearly outlined which indicated that all tax breaks will be gradually eliminated while maintaining a low tax rate. Any necessary support for the economy shall be provided through increased public spending, which has been shown to produce superior outcomes. This announcement provides a definitive indication of the government's intentions regarding taxation, and suggests a shift towards a more fiscally responsible approach that prioritizes public investment over tax incentives.
