= Public Provident Fund (India) =

Savings-cum-tax-saving instrument in India

The Public Provident Fund (PPF) is a voluntary savings-tax-reduction social security instrument in India, introduced by the National Savings Institute of the Ministry of Finance in 1968. The scheme's main objective is to mobilize small savings for social security during uncertain times by offering an investment with reasonable returns combined with income tax benefits. The scheme is offered by the Central Government. Balance in the PPF account is not subject to attachment under any order or decree of court under the Government Savings Banks Act, 1873. However, Income Tax and other Government authorities can attach the account for recovering tax dues.

The 2019 Public Provident Fund Scheme, introduced by the Government on 12 December 2019, resulted in the rescinding of the earlier 1968 Public Provident Fund Scheme.

== Eligibility ==
Individuals who are residents of India are eligible to open their account under the Public Provident Fund and are entitled to tax-free returns.

=== Non-resident Indians ===
As of August 2018, according to the Indian Ministry of Finance (Department of Economic Affairs), NRIs (Non-resident Indians) are not allowed to open new PPF accounts. However, they can continue their existing PPF accounts until their 15-year maturity period. An amendment to earlier rules allowing NRIs to invest in PPF was proposed in the 2018 Finance Bill, but has not yet been approved.

In October 2017, a notification was passed by the Ministry of Finance regarding an amendment to the PPF scheme of 1968, which would deem a PPF account closed from the day a person became a non-resident. This led to much confusion. Subsequently, the ministry issued an office memorandum in February 2018 keeping the above notification in abeyance until any further order on this matter. Thus, the situation remained unchanged.

== Investment and returns ==
A minimum yearly deposit of ₹500 is required to open and maintain a PPF account. A PPF account holder can deposit a maximum of ₹150,000 in his/her PPF account (including those where the person is the guardian) per financial year. There must be a guardian for PPF accounts opened in the name of minor children. Parents can act as guardians in such PPF accounts of minor children. Any amount deposited more than ₹150,000 in a financial year will not earn any interest. The amount can be deposited in lump sum or installments per year. However, this does not mean a single deposit is made once a month.

The Ministry of Finance, Government of India announces the rate of interest for PPF account every quarter. This interest is compounded annually and is paid in March every year. Interest is calculated on the lowest balance between the close of the fifth day and the last day of every month.

=== Interest rates ===
Period	Interest Rate
April 1986 – January 2000	12.0%
January 2000 – February 2001	11.0%
March 2001 – February 2002	9.5%
March 2002 – February 2003	9.0%
March 2003 – November 2011	8.0%
December 2011 – March 2012	8.6%
April 2012 – March 2013	8.8%
April 2013 – March 2016	8.7%
April 2016 – September 2016	8.1%
October 2016 – March 2017	8.0%
April 2017 – June 2017	7.9%
July 2017 – December 2017	7.8%
January 2018 – September 2018	7.6%
October 2018 – June 2019	8.0%
July 2019 – March 2020	7.9%
April 2020 – September 2026	7.1%

== Duration of scheme ==
The original duration is 15 years. Thereafter it can either be closed and the entire amount can be withdrawn, or on application by the subscriber, it can be extended for 1 or more blocks of 5 years each, with or without making further contributions.

== PPF maturity options ==
Subscriber has 3 options once the maturity period is over.

1. Complete withdrawal.
2. Extend the PPF account with no contribution – The PPF account can be extended after the completion of 15 years; the subscriber doesn't need to put any amount after maturity. This is the default option, meaning if the subscriber doesn't take any action within one year of his PPF account maturity, this option activates automatically. Any amount can be withdrawn from the PPF account if the option of extension with no contribution is chosen. The only restriction is only one withdrawal is permitted in a financial year. The rest of the amount keeps earning interest.
3. Extend the PPF account with contribution – With this option, the subscriber can put money in his PPF account after the extension. If a subscriber wants to choose this option, he must submit Form H to the bank where he has a PPF account within one year from the maturity date (before completing 16 years in PPF). With this option, the subscriber can only withdraw a maximum of 60% of his PPF amount (the amount in the PPF account at the beginning of the extended period) within the entire 5-year block. Every year, only a single withdrawal is permitted.

== Loans ==
Loan facility is available from the third to the fifth financial years. The rate of interest charged on loan taken by the subscriber of a PPF account on or after 12 December 2019 shall be 1% more than the prevailing interest on PPF.

Public Provident Fund Scheme, 2019 has reduced the interest spread to 1% from an earlier spread of 2%.

Up to 25% of the balance at the end of the second immediately preceding year would be allowed as a loan. Such withdrawals are to be repaid within 36 months.

A second loan could be availed within the third and before the sixth year and only if the first one is fully repaid. Individuals are not permitted to take loans once they are eligible for withdrawals. Inactive or discontinued accounts are not eligible for loans.

== Features ==
The central government establishes the public provident fund. One can voluntarily open an account with any nationalized bank, selected authorized private bank, or post office. The account can be opened in the name of individuals, including minors.

- The minimum amount is ₹500, which can be deposited.
- The current interest rate is 7.1% annually (Q1 of FY 2024-25).
- Interest received is tax-free.
- The entire balance can be withdrawn on maturity.
- The maximum amount that can be deposited annually is ₹150,000 in an account.
- The interest earned on the PPF subscription is compounded annually.
- All the balance that accumulates over time is exempted from wealth tax.

== Withdrawals from PPF account ==
There is a lock-in period of 15 years, and the money can be withdrawn in full after its maturity period. However, pre-mature withdrawals can be made from the start of the seventh financial year. The maximum amount that can be withdrawn pre-maturely is equal to 50% of the amount that stood in the account at the end of the fourth year preceding year or the end of the immediately preceding year, whichever is lower.

After 15 years of maturity, the full PPF amount, which is tax-free, can be withdrawn, including the interest amount.

== Nomination ==
Nomination facility is available in the name of one or more persons. The subscriber may also define the shares of nominees.

== PPF Penalty / Revival / Nomination ==
If a minimum contribution of any amount in any year is not invested, then the account will be deactivated. To activate the account, the bearer must pay ₹50 as a penalty for each inactive year. He/she must deposit ₹500 each as each inactive year's contribution.

In case of the account holder's death, the balance amount will be paid to his nominee or legal heir even before 15 years. Nominees or legal heirs are not eligible to continue the deceased's account.

If balance amount in the account of a deceased is higher than ₹150,000 then the nominee or legal heir has to prove the identity to claim the amount.

== Premature closure of PPF account ==
The 2016 amendment to the Public Provident Fund Scheme introduced changes to Paragraph 9, Sub-rule 3(C), allowing for the premature closure of PPF Accounts. Premature closure is now permitted after 5 years for the medical treatment of family members or for the higher education of the account holder. However, premature closure comes with an interest rate penalty of 1%. As per GOI, 12 December 2019 NOTIFICATIONS some new rules for prematurely withdrawal added

1. If there is a change in residency, the account holder must provide a visa, passport, or income tax return, or the account may be closed.
2. Higher education expenses for oneself or dependents must be supported by fee bills or admission confirmation letters, or the account may be closed. Remaining rules are same as demise of holder or medical condition of self or dependent.

== Transfer of PPF account ==
The account can be transferred to other branches/ other banks or Post Offices and vice versa upon request by the subscriber. The service is free of charges.

Step 1 – Approach the bank or post office branch where the PPF account is held and ask for the form for making the transfer. The bank or post office will provide you with a form which is to be filled.

Step 2 – The existing bank will then forward the certified copy of the account, the account opening application, nomination form, and specimen signature. It will also forward the cheque/dd for the outstanding amount in the PPF account to the new bank at the branch specified by the customer.

Step 3 – Once your bank receives these documents, the bank will inform you and ask you to submit a new PPF account opening form along with the old PPF passbook. You can also provide nominations for this new account. You will also be required to submit the KYC documents.

Step 4 – If you hold an internet banking facility with your bank, after a few weeks, check that the transferred PPF account now shows up under the PPF account tab/link in your login. If that is not the case, inquire the local bank branch.

== PPF tax concessions ==
Annual contributions qualify for tax deduction under Section 80C of income tax as per the old Tax regime. The tax benefit is capped at ₹150,000 per financial year.

PPF falls under the EEE (Exempt, Exempt, Exempt) tax basket. Contribution to the PPF account is eligible for tax benefit under Section 80C of the Income Tax Act in the old Tax Regime. Interest earned is exempt from income tax, and maturity proceeds are also exempt from tax.

According to R.K. Mohapatra, General Manager-Finance, IRCON International, and author of the award-winning book "Retirement Planning: A Simple Guide for Individuals", in the falling interest rate era, investment in PPF make senses for people who are in higher income tax brackets because of the advantages of exempt-exempt-exempt (EEE) scheme, which means they get tax deduction under Section 80C when they invest, and the accrual of interest as well as withdrawal is completely tax-free.

== See also ==
- Equity-linked savings scheme
- National Pension System
- National Savings Certificates (India)
- 401(k)
- Roth IRA
- Retirement plans in the United States
- Individual retirement account
