= Devanathaswamy Temple, Peraiyur =

Shiva temple in Tamil Nadu, India

Devanathaswamy Temple is a Siva temple in Peraiyur in Pudukkottai district in Tamil Nadu (India).

== Vaippu Sthalam ==
It is one of the shrines of the Vaippu Sthalams sung by Tamil Saivite Nayanar Sundarar.

== Presiding deity ==
The presiding deity is known as Devanathaswamy as well as Devanathar. The Goddess is known as Devanayaki.

== Speciality ==
This place was known as Devamalai and Perumanallur.

== Another Shiva temple ==
There is also another Shiva temple in Peraiyur, known as Naganathaswamy Temple.
