= National Pension System =

Pension scheme in India

- Abbreviation: NPS
- Predecessor: Old Pension Scheme
- Formation: January 1, 2004; 22 years ago
- Type: Pension cum investment scheme launched by Government of India
- Legal status: Regulated by Pension Fund Regulatory and Development Authority
- Purpose: Provide defined-contribution based pension for retirees and extend old age security coverage to all citizens
- Headquarters: New Delhi
- Products: NPS-Central Govt.; NPS-State Govt.; NPS-Corporate Sector; NPS-All Citizens of India (since May 1, 2009; 17 years ago); NPS Lite (since April 1, 2010; 16 years ago); NPS Swavalamban and; Atal Pension Yojana (APY) (since June 1, 2015; 11 years ago)
- Members: 6,35,43,628 Subscribers (30 April 2023)
- AUM: ▲₹898,954 crore (US$96 billion) (April 2023)
- Government Sector Subscribers (April 2023): Union Govt Employees 24,06,216; State Govt Employees 61,19,900
- Private Sector Subscribers (April 2023): Corporate Employees 17,14,011; Unorganized 29,83,484
- Other Subscribers (April 2023): NPS Swavalamban 41,73,888; Atal Pension Yojana 4,61,46,129
- Parent organization: NPS Trust
- Affiliations: Central Record Keeping Agency (CRA); Pension Funds (PFs); Trustee Bank (TB); Points of Presence (PoPs); Custodian; Retirement Advisor; Annuity Service Provider
- Website: Official website
- Department of Financial Services, Ministry of Finance - Government of India

The National Pension System (NPS) is a defined-contribution pension system in India regulated by the Pension Fund Regulatory and Development Authority (PFRDA) which is under the jurisdiction of the Ministry of Finance of the Government of India. National Pension System Trust (NPS Trust) was established by PFRDA as per the provisions of the Indian Trusts Act of 1882 to take care of the assets and funds under this scheme for the best interest of the subscriber.

NPS Trust is the registered owner of all assets under the NPS architecture which is held for the benefit of the subscribers under NPS. The securities are purchased by Pension Funds on behalf of, and in the name of the Trustees, however individual NPS subscribers remain the beneficial owner of the securities, assets, and funds. NPS Trust, under the NPS Trust regulations, is responsible for monitoring the operational and functional activities of NPS intermediaries’ viz. custodian, Pension Funds, Trustee Bank, Central Recordkeeping Agency, Point of Presence, Aggregators, and of IRDAI-registered Annuity Service Providers (empanelled with PFRDA) and also for providing directions/advisory to PF(s) for protecting the interest of subscribers, ensuring compliance through an audit by Independent Auditors, and Performance review of Pension Funds etc.

The New Pension Scheme was implemented with the decision of the Union Government to replace the Old Pension Scheme which had defined-benefit pensions for all its employees. Notification No. 5/7/2003-ECB issued by the Ministry of Finance (Department of Economic Affairs) in a Press Release dated 22 December 2003 mandated NPS for all new recruits (except armed forces) joining government services from 1 January 2004 While the scheme was initially designed for government employees only, it was opened up for all citizens of India between the age of 18 and 65 in 2009, for OCI card holders and PIO's in October 2019. On 26 August 2021, PFRDA increased the maximum entry age for the National Pension System (NPS) from 65 years to 70 years. As per the revised norms, any Indian Citizen, resident or non-resident, and Overseas Citizen of India (OCI) between the age of 18–70 years can join NPS and continue or defer their NPS Account up to the age of 75 years. It is administered and regulated by the Pension Fund Regulatory and Development Authority (PFRDA).

On 10 December 2018, the Government of India made NPS an "entirely tax-free" instrument in India where the entire corpus escapes tax at maturity. The "entirely tax free" description is a bit misleading as the beneficiary may be required to purchase an annuity and while the lump sump withdrawal itself may be tax free, the annuity income is taxable as ordinary income at applicable rate Any individual who is a subscriber of NPS can claim tax benefit for Tier-I account under Sec 80 CCD (1) within the overall ceiling of ₹1.5 lakhs under Sec 80 C of Income Tax Act. 1961. An additional deduction for investment up to ₹50,000 in NPS (Tier I account) is available exclusively to NPS subscribers under subsection 80CCD (1B). The changes in NPS was notified through changes in The Income-tax Act, 1961, during the 2019 Union budget of India. There is no tax benefit on investment towards Tier II NPS Account. NPS is limited EEE, to the extent of 60%. 40% has to be compulsorily used to purchase an annuity, which is taxable at the applicable tax slab. In 2021, withdrawal rules at the time of maturity was changed, and a person can withdraw entire NPS corpus lump sum if it is Rs 5 lakh or less, but 40% will be taxable.

Contributions to NPS receive tax exemptions under Section 80C and Section 80CCD of the Income Tax Act. Starting from 2016, an additional tax benefit of Rs 50,000 under Section 80CCD(1B) is provided under NPS, which is over the ₹1.5 lakh exemption of Section 80C. Private fund managers are important parts of NPS. NPS is considered one of the best tax saving instruments after 40% of the corpus was made tax-free at the time of maturity and it is ranked just below equity-linked savings scheme (ELSS).

== Background ==
The National Pension System (NPS) is a voluntary define contribution pension system administered and regulated by the Pension Fund Regulatory and Development Authority (PFRDA), created by an Act of the Parliament of India. The NPS started with the decision of the Government of India to stop defined benefit pensions for all its employees who joined after 1 January 2004. While the scheme was initially designed for government employees only, it was opened up for all citizens of India in 2009. NPS is an attempt by the government to create a pensioned society in India. Today, the NPS is readily available and tax efficient under Section 80C and Section 80CCD. Under the NPS, an individual can contribute to his retirement account. Also, his employer can contribute to the welfare and social security of the individual.

NPS is a quasi-EET instrument in India where 40% of the corpus escapes tax at maturity, while 60% of the corpus is taxable. Of the 60% taxable corpus, 40% is tax-exempt as it has to be compulsorily used to purchase an annuity. The annuity income will be taxed, though. The remaining 20% alone will now be taxed at slab rates on withdrawal. In 2017 Union budget of India, 25% exemption of the contribution made by an employee has been announced as a form of premature partial withdrawal in NPS. This amendment will take effect on 1 April 2018 and will, accordingly, apply in relation to the assessment year 2018–19. NPS is a market-linked annuity product.

== Regulatory framework ==
In 1999, the Government of India initiated the OASIS project, aimed at reviewing policies related to old age income security within the nation. As a result, the Defined Contribution Pension System was introduced for new entrants to Central/State Government service, except for the Defence forces, replacing the earlier Defined Benefit Pension System.

On 23 August 2003, the Interim Pension Fund Regulatory & Development Authority (PFRDA) was established by the Government of India to oversee pension funds and protect subscribers' interests. The PFRDA Act of 2013 officially confirmed PFRDA as the regulator for the Indian pension sector, effective from 1 February 2014. Notably, other entities like Employee Provident Fund, pension funds by life insurers, and mutual fund firms are beyond PFRDA's scope.

The contributory pension system, later termed the National Pension System (NPS), began on 22 December 2003, applied from 1 January 2004. It expanded to all Indian citizens, including self-employed professionals and the unorganised sector from 1 May 2009, on a voluntary basis.

== Architecture ==
Unlike traditional financial products where all the functions (sales, operations, service, fund management, depository) are done by one company, NPS follows an unbundled architecture where each step of the value chain has been made disjointed from the other. This unbundling not only allows the customer to mix and match his providers of service through the value chain, picking the best-suited option, but it also curbs the incidence of misselling.

NPS architecture consists of the NPS Trust, which is entrusted with safeguarding subscribers' interests, three Central Recordkeeping Agencies (CRAs) which maintain the data and records, Point of Presence (PoP) as collection, distribution and servicing arms, Pension Fund Managers (PFM) for managing the investments of subscribers, a Custodian to take care of the assets purchased by the fund managers, and a Trustee Bank to manage the banking operations. At age 60 the customer can choose to purchase pension Annuity Service Providers (ASP). In 2017, PFRDA increased the entry age in NPS to 70 years, from earlier upper age limit of 65 years.

There are 13 Pension Fund Managers (PFMs) in NPS, out of which SBI Pension Funds is the largest. All the major commercial banks, brokers and stock holding corporations perform the role of PoP. The subscriber can choose any one of them.

Initially, government employees had no say in the matter of choice of fund manager or investment allocation in NPS, as both are decided by the government. In the default Standard scheme, NPS contributions of government employees is distributed evenly across three public sector fund managers : SBI Pension Funds, LIC Pension Fund, and UTI Pension Fund. Now, government can choose from additional choices (LC-50, LC-25, Scheme G).

The subscriber can choose to invest either, wholly or in combination, in four types of investment schemes offered by the pension fund managers. These are:

- Scheme E (equity and related instruments): maximum 75% equity exposure
- Scheme C (corporate bonds and related instruments): no upper limit, invests only in high-quality corporate bonds
- Scheme G (government securities and related instruments): no upper limit, invests only in government bonds up to 100%
- Scheme A (alternative investment funds) which allows up to 5% (newly added asset class only for private sector subscriber with active choice)

The subscriber can either specify the percentage allocation herself with Active Choice or may choose from four predefined life cycle fund options under Auto Choice. These are:

- LC-75 (Aggressive Life cycle Fund): maximum 75% is invested in equity; equity exposure decreases gradually as the subscriber turns 36 and continues to do so till her 55th birthday.
- LC-50 (Moderate Life cycle Fund): maximum 50% is invested in equity; equity exposure decreases gradually as the subscriber turns 36 and continues to do so till her 55th birthday.
- LC-25 (Conservative Life cycle Fund): maximum 25% is invested in equity; equity exposure decreases gradually as the subscriber turns 36 and continues to do so till her 55th birthday.
- BLC (Balanced Life cycle Fund): maximum 50% is invested in equity; equity exposure decreases gradually as the subscriber turns 46 and continues to do so till her 55th birthday.

This re-balancing of portfolio takes place on subscriber's birthday.

NPS offers two types of accounts to its subscribers:

- Tier I:The primary account, which is a pension account which has restrictions on withdrawals and utilization of accumulated corpus. All the tax breaks that NPS offers are applicable only to Tier I accounts.
- Tier II: In order to introduce some liquidity to the scheme, the PFRDA allows for a Tier II account where subscribers with pre-existing Tier I accounts can deposit and withdraw money as and when they want. NPS Tier II is an investment account, similar to a mutual fund in characteristics, but offers no exit load, no commissions, good returns. A Tier II Tax Saver Account offers tax benefits to central government employees under Section 80C but has partial liquidity.

The contribution to voluntary savings account (also called Tier-II account) can only be made by the subscriber and not by any third party.

Upon exit, subscriber re-invests a portion of the accumulated corpus is an annuity plan which provides the guaranteed lifelong pension. There are fifteen annuity service providers (ASPs) for subscribers to choose from.

== Who can join ==
A citizen of India, whether resident or non-resident or an OCI cardholder can join NPS (Through a circular issued on 29 October 2019 PFRDA has stated that now Overseas Citizen of India (OCIs) can enrol to invest in NPS tier-1 accounts), subject to the following conditions:

- The subscriber should be between 18 and 70 years old as of the date of submission of his/her application to the Point of Presence (POP) / Point of Presence–Service Provider-Authorized branches of POP for NPS (POP-SP).
- The subscribers should comply with the Know Your Customer (KYC) norms as detailed in the subscriber registration form.
- Should not be Un-discharged insolvent and individuals of unsound mind.
- A non-resident can open an account, but the account will be closed if the citizenship status of the NRI has been changed.
- As per circular No: PFRDA/2021/36/SUP-CRA/14 Dated:26.08.2021, those Subscribers who have closed their NPS Accounts are permitted to open a new NPS Account as per increased age eligibility norms, i.e. From 65 years to 70 years.
- Parents / guardians of minor Indian citizens (age 0–18 years) can open an NPS Vatsalya Account for their children / wards.

== Subscriber base ==
The Central government employee subscribers grew 4.9% on year to 2.28 million in FY22 while state governments subscribers grew 8.5% to 55.8 lakh during the year. The total number of subscribers as of March 31, 2022, was about 1.6 crore. Total NPS assets under management stood at ₹7,36,000 crore as of March 31, 2022, up from ₹5,78,000 crore as on March 31, 2021. As of February 2026, the total assets under management was over ₹ 16,50,000 crores with total subscriber base of almost 2.2 crores

== Withdrawal ==
Premature withdrawal in NPS before age 60 required parking 60% of the sum in an annuity. One can withdraw 40 percent of the corpus before 60 years but he/she must buy annuity with 60 percent of the corpus. In 2016, the NPS allowed withdrawal of up to 25% of contributions for specified reasons, if the scheme is at least 3 years old with certain conditions. One can withdraw the complete amount if the pension collected is less than ₹5,00,000. This amount was increased to ₹5,00,000 as per PFRDA Circular dated 14 June 2021.

=== Systematic Lumpsum Withdrawal ===
Under this scheme, one can choose to remain invested with 60% of the corpus in NPS by contributing till the age of 75 and enable the SLW feature while the corpus continues to grow.

== Tax benefits ==
Investment in NPS is eligible for tax benefits as follows:

- Investment of up to ₹1,50,000 under Section 80CCD(1). The benefit is additionally capped at 10% of basic salary. For non-salaried individuals, this benefit is capped at 20% of gross total income. The benefit under Section 80C, Section 80CCC and Section 80CCD(1) is capped at ₹1,50,000 as per 80CCE.
- Additional investment of up to ₹50,000 under Section 80CCD(1B). This is over and above tax benefit under Section 80C; and is exclusive to NPS.
- Employer co-contribution up to 10% of basic and DA under Section 80CCD(2) in the Old Tax Regime.
- Employer co-contribution up to 14% of basic and DA under Section 80CCD(2) in the New Tax Regime.

== See also ==
- Old Pension Scheme (OPS)
- Pensions in India
- Equity-linked savings scheme (ELSS)
- Mutual fund
- Income tax in India
- 401(k)
- Roth IRA
- Retirement plans in the United States
- Individual retirement account
- Unified Pension Scheme
