= S Pudur block =

Community in Tamil Nadu, India

S Pudur block (Semmampatti Pudur) is a Panchayat Union and a revenue block in Singampunari Taluk of Sivaganga district of Tamil Nadu, India.

It has a total of 21 panchayat villages.

List of Panchayat Villages of Semmampatti Pudur (S Pudur):

- 1. Chettigurichi
- 2. Karisalpatti
- 3. Ganapathipatti
- 4. Dharmapatti Kondapalayam
- 5. Keelavayal
- 6. Kulathupatti
- 7. Kunnathur
- 8. Manaloor
- 9. Manthagudipatti
- 10. Melavannariruppu
- 11. Minnamalaipatti
- 12. Musundapatti
- 13. Neduvayal
- 14. Urathupatti
- 15. Piranpatti
- 16. Pudur
- 17. K. Pudupatti
- 18. Puluthipatti
- 19. Ulagampatti
- 20. Valasaipatti
- 21. Warapoor

== See also ==
- Ulagampatti
