= Equity Linked Savings Scheme =

Diversified equity scheme

An Equity Linked Savings Scheme, popularly known as ELSS, is a type of diversified equity scheme which comes, with a lock-in period of three years, offered by mutual funds in India. They offer tax benefits under the Section 80C of Income Tax Act 1961. ELSSes can be invested using both SIP (Systematic Investment Plan) and lump sums investment options. There is a three years lock-in period, and thus has better liquidity compared to other options like NSC and Public Provident Fund. Mutual funds are subjective to fluctuations in the market.

== Features ==
- Investment Options: ELSS investment can be made in SIPs as well as on a lump sum basis.
- Lock-in Period: These have a lock-in period of three years which is much more flexible than NSC and PPF.
- Market Exposure: ELSS funds majorly invest in equity and related instruments, they are highly exposed to market risks hence very volatile.
- Tax Benefits: Investment of up to ₹1,50,000 every financial year is eligible for deduction under section 80C.
- Returns: A flat rate of 10% is charged on long-term capital gains exceeding ₹1 lakh.

== See also ==
- National Pension System (NPS)
- Mutual fund
- Income tax in India
