= Unified Pension Scheme =

Pension scheme in India

The Unified Pension Scheme (UPS), introduced by the Government of India in 2024 as an optional pension scheme along with the National Pension System (NPS) for the government employees, creates a centralised pension system for Central government employees. The scheme is designed to consolidate various existing pension schemes. However, main drawback of the scheme is after retirement irrespective of age, pension start only from superannuation date ie. 60 years. There is no pension from retirement date to till attending the age 60 years. Employees raising this issue as major drawback especially paramilitary soldiers doing duties especially need very competitive physical standard.

== Background ==
There have been long pending demands from the Central Government employees to introduce a more comprehensive pension system. Various opposition parties and leaders have raised the issue several times in their election speeches for the reintroduction of the Old Pension Scheme (OPS).
