= Voluntary Disclosure of Income Scheme =

20th-century Indian economic policy

- Country: India
- Closed: 31 December 1997; 28 years ago

The Voluntary Disclosure of Income Scheme (VDIS) was a very unconventional but successful step among Indian economic policies. It would give an opportunity to the income tax or wealth tax defaulters to disclose their undisclosed income at the prevailing tax rates. This scheme would also ensure that the laws relating to economic offences would not be applicable for those defaulters. Over 350,000 people disclosed their income and assets under this scheme, which brought a revenue of ₹78 billion (US$810 million) to the Indian finance ministry. The scheme was closed on 31 December 1997. The Union Finance Minister P. Chidambaram hoped, "It is my faith that given a chance, the people of India (would) come clean of the black money."

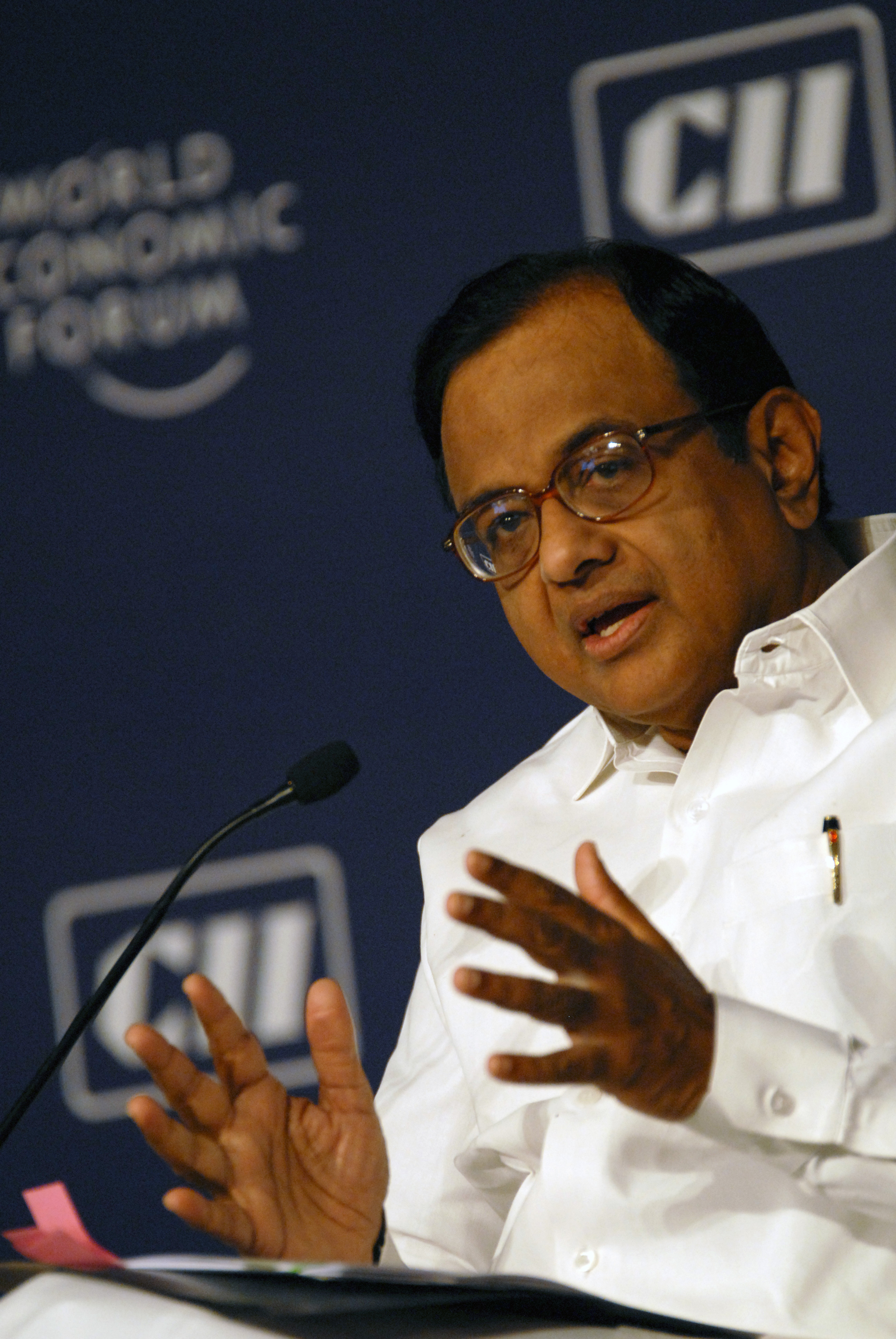
Palaniappan Chidambaram, then Union Finance Minister

== Controversies ==
VDIS granted income-tax defaulters indefinite immunity from prosecution under the Foreign Exchange Regulation Act, 1973, the Income Tax Act, 1961, the Wealth Tax Act, 1957, and the Companies Act, 1956 in exchange for self-valuation and disclosure of income and assets. The Comptroller and Auditor General of India condemned the scheme in his report as abusive and a fraud on the genuine taxpayers of the country.
