= Sanjiv Mehta (Indian businessman) =

Indian business executive

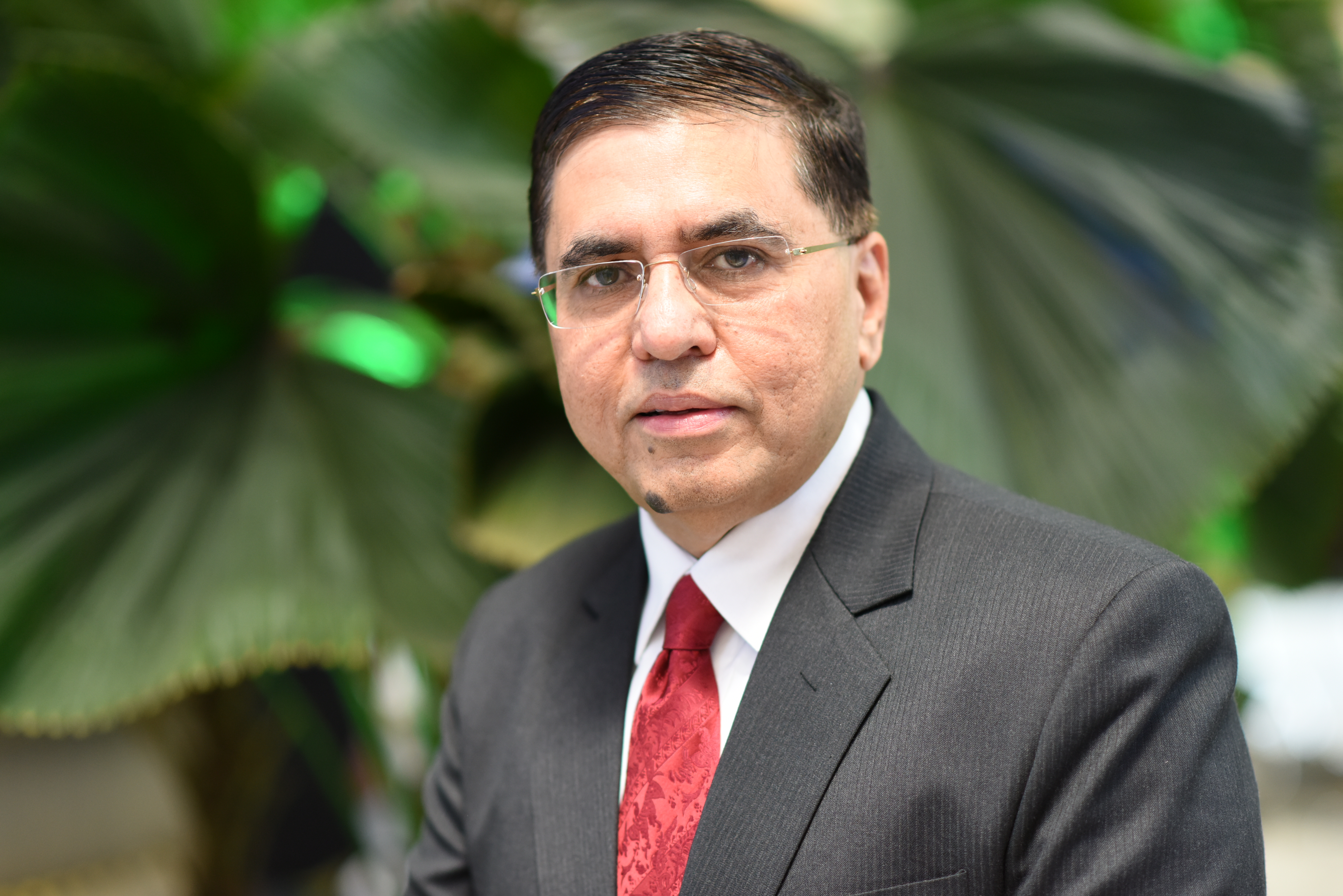
- Born: 1959 or 1960 (age 66–67)
- Education: Institute of Chartered Accountants of India
- Occupations: President, Unilever South Asia
- Spouse: Mona Mehta (m.1993)
- Children: 2

Sanjiv Mehta (born 1959/1960) is an Indian business executive, and the former chairman and managing director (MD) of Hindustan Unilever Limited, India's largest fast moving consumer goods (FMCG) company and one of the top five most valuable companies in India. Mehta became the CEO and MD of Hindustan Unilever in October 2013, and in June 2018 was appointed chairman. He also heads Unilever's business in South Asia, as cluster president encompassing businesses in India, Pakistan, Bangladesh, Sri Lanka and Nepal. Mehta is a member of the Unilever leadership executive, its global executive board.

== Education ==
Born in Kanpur, Mehta studied in Mumbai and Nagpur. He is a chartered accountant from the Institute of Chartered Accountants of India and later completed the Advanced Management Programme from the Harvard Business School.

== Career ==
He began his career in 1983 with Union Carbide. Early in his career, he was part of the crisis management team that worked on the Bhopal Gas tragedy in 1984. Since then, to date, he has been known to start most meetings by reviewing the safety agenda. In 1998, he joined the board of Unilever Bangladesh as its commercial director. In April 2002 he was appointed as the chairman and managing director of Unilever Bangladesh. Under his leadership, Unilever Bangladesh went on to become the crown jewel of Unilever's parent company given its competitive growth and stellar performance. In 2007, he moved to Manila as the chairman of Unilever Philippines, and in 2008 was appointed as the chairman of Unilever North Africa and Middle East (NAME). In 2013, he took over Unilever's business in India and South Asia, as Chairman and MD of Hindustan Unilever (HUL).

Under his leadership, in seven years HUL's market capitalisation increased from $17 billion to over $70 billion, making HUL the top five most valuable companies in India, as well as Asia's largest consumer staples company. HUL is now the second-largest Unilever business in the world.

With Sanjiv at the helm of the company, HUL has won several awards, including prestigious Economic Times' Company of the Year' & 'Corporate Citizen of the Year' awards, Business Standard's 'Company of the year' award and the Asian Centre for Corporate Governance and Sustainability's 'Best Governed Company'. Forbes has also rated HUL the 8th most innovative company in the world and the most innovative company in India. A global study by Aon Hewitt ranked HUL as the 3rd best Company globally for building leaders behind GE and IBM.

Mehta is a firm believer of "doing well by doing good". Under him HUL has taken on and expanded several initiatives that have societal and environmental impact. Through the Hindustan Unilever Foundation and its community partners, water potential of more than 1.3 trillion litres has been created by democratizing water management in villages across India. Further, under the Shakti program, over 136 thousand Shakti women entrepreneurs have been empowered in rural India. Other than that HUL's ongoing health and hygiene initiatives have impacted more than 154 million people all over the country.

In 2021, Sanjiv took over as the President of Federation of Indian Chambers of Commerce and Industry, India's largest and oldest apex business organizations.

== Personal life ==
Mehta grew up in Mumbai, and is the son of S. P. Mehta and Anita Mehta. His parents were displaced during the Partition of India. His father was a senior executive with the Reserve Bank of India.

He is married to Mona Mehta, who is also a chartered accountant. The couple have twin daughters, Naina and Roshni, who studied at Cornell, MIT, and Harvard, respectively.

== Boards ==
Ex-President of FICCI

Non-Executive Independent Board member of Air India Limited, TATA Group since 2022

Member of South Asia Advisory Board of Harvard Business School

Co-chairs the Advisory Network to the High-Level Panel for a ‘Sustainable Ocean Economy’

Chairs ‘Vikaasa’, a coalition of top Indian and MNC companies

Director of Board of Indian School of Business

Member of the Breach Candy Hospital Trust

== Awards and recognition ==
- 2004, Business Executive of the Year - American Chamber of Commerce Dhaka
- May 2016, 'The Outstanding CEO of the Year' at the 3rd edition of the CEO AWARDS 2016 organised by CEO INDIA magazine
- January 2017, 'Management Man of the Year' award from Bombay Management Association
- January 2018, Business Leader award from the Institute of Chartered Accountants of India
- November 2018, Economic Times Award 2018 for Corporate Citizen
- November 2018, Best CEO Multinational - Forbes India
- March 2019, Honorary Degree - Doctor of Philosophy in Business Management from Xavier Institute of Management, Bhubaneswar
- 2019, “Business Leader” of the year award by All India Management Association
- January 2019, Industry Role Model - Lokmat's Most Stylish Awards
- 2019, Best Transformational Leader - Asian Centre for Corporate Governance and Sustainability
- 2019, Business Leader of the Year - The Economic Times
- 2020, Pralhad P. Chhabria Memorial Global Award - Priyadarshni Academy
- 2021, Sir Jehangir Ghandy Medal for Industrial and Social Peace - Xavier Institute of Management (XLRI)
- 2021, JRD Tata Corporate Leadership Award - All India Management Association (AIMA)
- 2021, Best CEO Medium Company Category - Business Today
