= National Savings Certificates (India) =

Government of India savings bond scheme

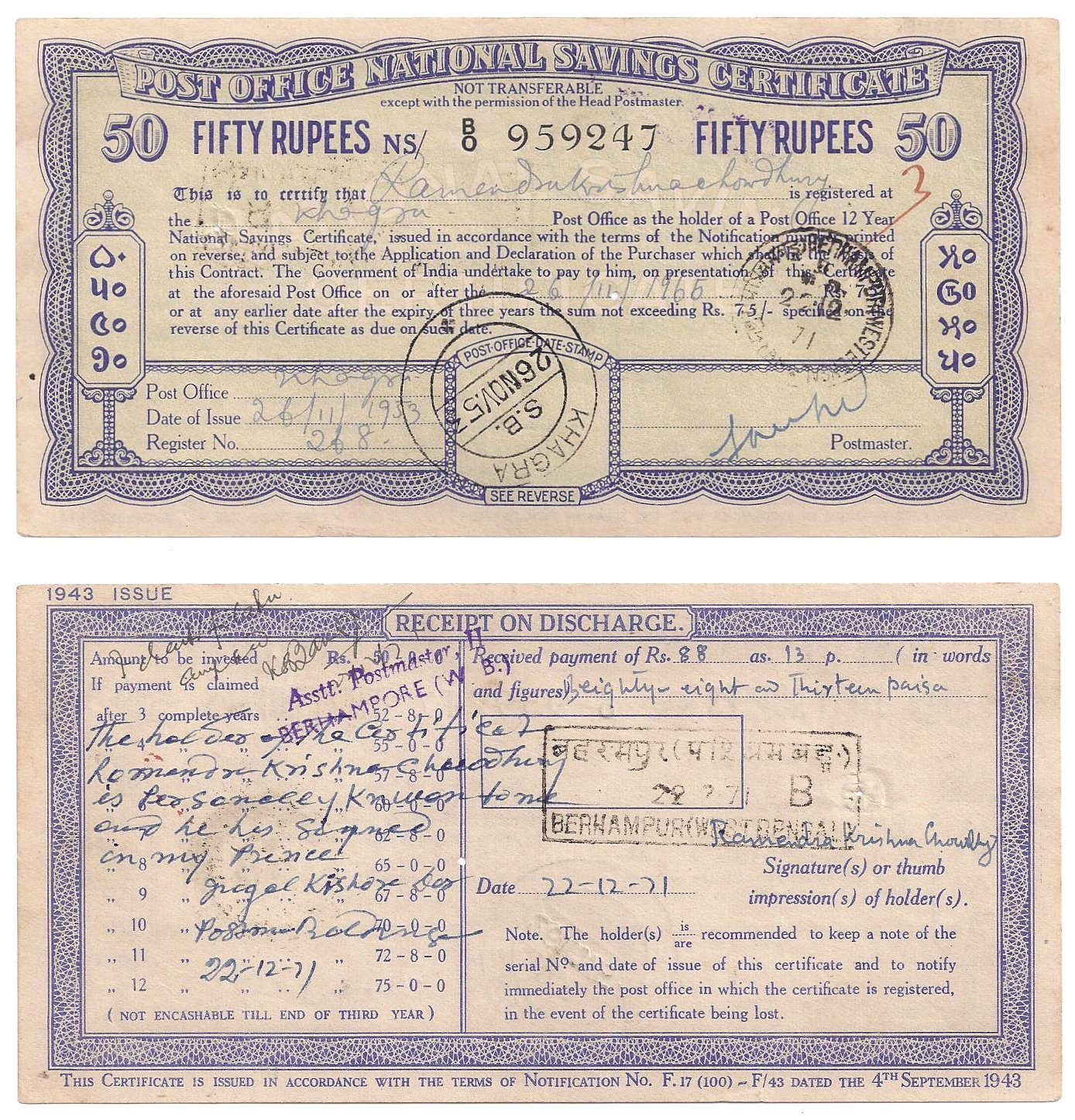
Both sides of 1953 Fifty-Rupees Post Office National Savings Certificate.

National Savings Certificates, popularly known as NSC, is an Indian Government savings bond, primarily used for small savings and income tax saving investments in India. It is part of the postal savings system of India Post.

These can be purchased from any Post Office in India by an adult (either in his/her own name or on behalf of a minor), a minor, a trust, and two adults jointly. These are issued for five year maturity and can be pledged to banks as collateral for availing loans. The holder gets the tax benefit under Section 80C of Income Tax Act, 1961.

Other similar government savings schemes in India include: Public Provident Fund (PPF), Post Office Fixed Deposit, Post Office Recurring Deposit, etc. The certificates were heavily promoted by the Indian government in the 1950s after India's independence, to collect funds for nation-building.

== Discontinuation of Physical Certificate ==
As of April 2016, Ministry of Finance enabled purchasing and redeeming of these bonds in electronic form and financial institutions no longer issue a physical pre-printed certificate.
