= Wealth-tax Act, 1957 =

Indian legislation

Parliament of India
- Long title: An Act to provide for the levy of wealth-tax
- Citation: Act No. 27 of 1957
- Territorial extent: whole of India
- Enacted by: Parliament of India
- Enacted: 12 September 1957
- Effective: 1 April 1957
- Abrogated: 1 April 2016
- Status: Abrogated

The Wealth-tax Act, 1957 was an Act of the Parliament of India that provides for the levying of wealth tax on an individual, Hindu Undivided Family or company. The wealth tax was levied on the net wealth owned by a person on a valuation date, i.e., 31 March of every year. The Act applies to the whole of India. The application of the Act has been discontinued since 1 April 2016.

The wealth tax was abolished in the Union Budget (2016–2017) presented by Union Finance Minister Arun Jaitley on 28 February 2016. The wealth tax was replaced with an additional surcharge of 2 per cent on the super rich with a taxable income of over 1 crore annually.

== Provisions ==
The Wealth Tax Act, 1957 governed the taxation process associated with the net wealth that an individual, a Hindu Undivided Family, or a company possesses on the valuation date.

The valuation date was an important component in the calculation of the Wealth Tax. The net wealth that an assessee possessed on the valuation date determined the amount of tax. The valuation date was the day of 31 March immediately preceding the Assessment Year.

Wealth tax was calculated at the rate of 0.25 percent (1.0 percent w.e.f April 2010) of the amount of net wealth that exceeds Rs. 50 lakh(Rs. 30 Lakh w.e.f April 2010) on the valuation date. The net wealth of an assessee included the value of specified unproductive assets on the valuation date after subtracting the debt the assessee owes on the said assets. Wealth tax did not attract any Education Cess or surcharge.

Wealth Tax is not applicable to

- Trusts
- Artificial Judicial Persons
- Partnership firms
- Association of persons (AOPs)
- A company registered under Section 25 of The Companies Act, 1956 (Section 8 of The Companies Act, 2013)
- Co-operative Societies
- Social clubs
- Political parties
- Mutual funds specified under Section 10 Clause (23D) of the Income Tax Act
