= Pension Fund Regulatory and Development Authority =

Indian regulator for pensions

Pension Fund Regulatory and Development Authority (PFRDA)
- State Emblem of India

- Logo of PFRDA
- Type: Regulatory agency
- Industry: Pension
- Founded: 23 August 2003; 23 years ago
- Headquarters: New Delhi, India
- Key people: Sivasubramanian Ramann (Chairman)
- Owner: Ministry of Finance, Government of India
- Number of employees: 98
- Divisions: National Pension System
- Website: pfrda.org.in

Pension Fund Regulatory and Development Authority (PFRDA) is the regulatory agency for overall supervision and regulation of pensions in India. It operates under the jurisdiction of Ministry of Finance in the Government of India. It was established in 2003 based on the recommendations of the Indian government OASIS report and was part of the establishment of the Indian National Pension Scheme.

== History ==
In 1999, the Government of India had commissioned a national project titled "OASIS" (an acronym for old age social & income security) to examine policy related to old age income security in India. Based on the recommendations of the OASIS report the Government of India introduced a new Defined Contribution Pension System for the new entrants to Central/State Government service, except to Armed Forces, replacing the existing system of Defined Benefit Pension System.

On 23 August 2003, the Interim Pension Fund Regulatory & Development Authority (PFRDA) was established through a resolution by the Government of India to promote, develop and regulate the pension sector in India. The contributory pension system was notified by the Government of India on 22 December 2003 to the National Pension System (NPS) with effect from 1 January 2004. The NPS was subsequently extended to all citizens of the country with effect from 1 May 2009 including self employed professionals and others in the unorganized sector on a voluntary basis.

The Pension Fund Regulatory & Development Authority Act was passed on 19 September 2013 and the same was notified on 1 February 2014. PFRDA regulates the NPS, subscribed by employees of Govt. of India, State Governments and by employees of private institutions/organizations & unorganized sectors. The PFRDA ensures the orderly growth and development of pension market.

PFRDA have set up a Trust under the Indian Trusts Act, 1882 to oversee the functions of the Pension Fund Managers (PFMs). The NPS Trust is composed of members representing diverse fields and brings wide range of talent to the regulatory framework. The Union Parliament passed the IPRDA Interim Pension Fund Regulatory & Development Authority Bill in February 2003 as a Budget Announcement, approved by the then President of India, Dr. APJ Abdul Kalam. It was meant to be in place until the final and fool-proof system was prepared, re-approved, and implemented in a way acceptable to all political parties in India, including the opposition. Tamil Nadu became the first state to implement NPS for its newly appointed employees from the financial year 2003–04, under the Chief Ministership of Jayalalithaa.

On 19 September 2013, the President, Pranab Mukherjee, gave his assent to Pension Fund Regulatory and Development Authority Bill of 2013, which was passed in the Monsoon Session of Parliament on 4 September 2013 in the Lok Sabha and 6 September 2013 in the Rajya Sabha, to make it a Permanent Act. This improved, foolproof and re-approved Bill, with the acceptance of all political parties in India, has replaced the old and imperfect IPRDA Bill of 2003. The President of India is the guardian of the PFRDA, subject to his Financial Emergency Powers, as per the Articles of Indian Constitution. PFRDA now has Full Autonomy & functioning Independently from F.Y. 2014–15.

== National Pension System ==
National Pension System is a defined contributory pensions introduced by Government of India. It is mandatory for all Central Government employees with effect from 1 January 2004. It extends to all citizens of India including workers of the unorganized sector on a voluntary basis with effect from 1 May 2009. On 29 October 2015 the Reserve Bank of India allowed Non-Resident Indians (NRI) to subscribe to NPS.

== Structure ==
The Authority consists of a chairperson and not more than six members, of whom at least three shall be whole-time members, to be appointed by the Central Government.

=== Members ===
1. Shri Sivasubramanian Ramann , Chairperson
2. Smt. Mamta Shankar, Whole-Time Member (Economics)
3. Shri Randip Singh Jagpal, Whole-Time Member (Law)
4. Shri Sanjay Pandey, Whole-Time Member (Finance)

== See also ==
- List of financial supervisory authorities by country
