= Ponnamaravathi =

Ponnamaravathi பொன்னமராவதி Ponnai
- Municipality
- Ponnamaravathi
- Nicknames: Gold City, Ponnai Maanagar
- Ponnamaravathi, Tamil Nadu
- Coordinates: 10.277600°N 78.542400°E
- Country: India
- State: Tamil Nadu
- District: Pudukkottai
- Founder: Ponnan and Amaran
- Named for: For the kings Ponnan and Amaran

Government
  - Type: Local governing bodies- Executive officer and Chairman
  - Body: Ponnamaravathi Municipality

Area
  - Greater Municipality: 8.75 km^{2} (3.38 sq mi)
- Elevation: 172 m (564 ft)

Population (2025)*Can be accurately known after data collection, subject to approximation.
  - Greater Municipality: 45,000
  - Rank: 3rd in Pudukkottai District, Just after Aranthangi
  - Urban: 18,500

Languages
  - Official Languages: Tamil, English
- Time zone: UTC+5:30 (IST)
- PIN: 622407
- Telephone code: 04333
- Vehicle registration: TN - 55 (Pudukkottai RTO)

Ponnamaravathi is a town in Pudukkottai district in the Indian state of Tamil Nadu. The town holds the status of Taluk. It is located 30 km to southwest of the district headquarter Pudukkottai, 58 km to south of Tiruchirapalli, 60 km to northeast of Madurai, 34 km to northwest of Karaikudi, 64 km to east of Dindukkal, 48 km to north of Sivagangai and 365 km to southwest of the state capital Chennai.

== Etymology ==
According to legend, It was named after founders of Ponnamaravathi Naadu, namely Ponnan and Amaran. They were ruling this area before British Raj rule.

Even today people gather at Amarakandan Oorani to celebrate festival for their legacy, marking the legend of garrison Alagaanda Thevar, who died bravely in the war between Pandyas and Ponnan, Amaran.

== History ==
=== Sangam Era (200 BCE- 300 CE/3rd Century AD) ===
Existence of Ponnamaravathi Settlement can be found in Sangam Texts like Silapathigaaram, Kalingathuparani. Also, Mahavasam - Historical text of Sri Lanka.

Silapathigaaram states that Ponnamaravathi is waypoint between Chola and Pandya Kingdom. This can be confirmed in Silapathigaaram mentions that Protagonists of the story stayed in Alagiya Nachiyamman Thirukovil when they were heading towards Madurai from Poompuhar.

Various Bhakthi Literatures can be also found with references. Naatukal in Ponnamaravathi stands as a solid evidence of existence of scholars (Pulavars) from Ponnamaravathi area.

=== Middle Emperors Age (3rd-15th Century AD) ===
It is under Chola rule for significant period of time. Rajaraja Cholan 2nd, Built Rajaraja Choleeswaram Temple here as a mark of their stronghold. This area is a battleground for Chola and Pandya Kingdom.

In Mahavamsam - The Historical book of Sri Lanka, stated that a three - storey place was burned down during the war between Cholas and Pandyas + Singalese forces under Parakiramabahu 1st (King of Polanaruwala Kingdom 1153-1186) .

Maravarman Sundara Pandyan 1st wanted to capture the area and waged wars on Cholas. Then after loss of central power of Cholas, The town come under rule of Pandyas for some period of time.

Then Ponnan and Amaran wanted to save this area from frequent wars and robberies, they established the settlement. However, they got defeated by Nedirajapandiyan with help of Nayaks. After the defeat, Pandyas demanded treasury of Ponnamaravathi. Amaran said that the treasure of this naadu (state) can be found, if they dug 10 acres of land till they cant see the Parambumalai. So the Pandyas dug the land, turns out there is no treasure. This is a wordplay by Amaran to distract them. For this act, Amaran was slaughtered. This dug land turns out to be Amarakandaan Oorani. The Oorani and the Chola temple near the Oorani is under control of Archealogical Survey Department of India.

After the fall of Moovendars (Great Three Tamil Kingdoms, Chera, Chola, Pandyas). This area was ruled by several dukes.

=== 16th Century AD - Mid 20th Century AD ===
During 16th Century, Ponnamaravathi was ruled by Marungapuri Dukes. Then fell into hands of Ramnad Sethupathi and Thondaimaan Kings. Thondaaimaans given power of Pudukkottai. By this Ponnamaravathi came under rule of Thondaimaan's Pudukkottai Kingdom in 1730. Raghunatha Raya Tondaimaan (1730), Vijaya Raghunatha Raya Thondaiman I (1730-1769) controlled this area. It was under Kingdom of Pudukkottai till the end of rule of The king Rajagolpala Tondaiman (1928-1948). It was under the ally of British and recognized as Princely State of Pudukkottai.

=== 15th August 1948 - Current ===
Sardar Vallabhai Patel requested Raja Rajagopala Thondaimaan to join Pudukkottai Kingdom with India. Ponnamaravathi became part of The Indian Union. Currently, It is standing with great remains of historical buildings.

== Geography ==
Map showing Ponnamaravathi and Its adjacent locations

| Geographical Characteristics | Data |
|---|---|
| Biome | Tropical Dry Decidious Forest |
| Hills and Mountains | Surrounded by: Pullankurichi Hills; Piranmalai (Parambumalai); Thoothur Hills |
| Coordinates | Latitude : 10.28' N; Longitude : 78.54' E |
| Climate | Tropical Climate with dry and hot season.: Avg Temperature: 32-34^{o}C; Annual Rainfall Average (mm) : 805 mm |
| Croplands % | ~90% |
| Soil type | Red Soil with some traces of Black soil |
| Rivers nearby | Manimuthaar (Sivagangai District); Agniyar River; Wellaru River |

== Demographics ==
Religious census (2011)*
| Religion | Percent(%) |
| Hindu | 92.02% |
| Muslim | 5.89% |
| Christian | 2.01% |
| Sikh | 0.02% |
| Buddhist | 0.00% |
| Jain | 0.00% |
| Other | 0.01% |
| No religion | 0.02% |

Ponnamaravathi is quite an old settlement.

Historical population
| Year | Pop. | ±% |
|---|---|---|
| 1991 | 10,993 | — |
| 2011 | 12,676 | +15.3% |
| 2025 | 18,500 | +45.9% |
Sources: Directorate of Town Panchayats; Ponnamaravathi Town Panchayat website

It had a population of 10993 in 1991.

In 2011, 12676 people were present,

In 2025, there is approximately 18500 people.

Of 18500 people, 92.02% people are Hindu religion followers. At second most percent of followership, Islam 5.89%, Followed by Christianity 2.01%.

== Economy ==
Ponnamaravathi is a commercial hub in Chettinad region for purchase of metals like Gold, Textiles, Raw materials.

Economy of Ponnamaravathi includes Hotels, Authentic Chettinad Restaurants, Food Courts. Major Economic boosts for Ponnamaravathi are establishments by Nattukottai Chettiars.

Aathikalathu Aalangara Maaligai, Jewelry Shops like A.Se.Chettiar and Co, PLA bus Company, Ponnamaravathy Bus Terminus boosted Ponnamaravathi's Economy.

Ponnamaravathy Bus Terminus is a major transport hub which helps in development of economy by providing connectivity to all districts in Tamil Nadu. (Connections to Pudukkottai, Trichy, Madurai, Coimbatore, Chennai, Tiruppur, Salem, Erode, Mettupalayam, Rameshwaram, Dindigul, Thanjavur, Palani, Karur, Singampunari, Tirupathur-Sivagangai)

== Culture ==
Every year, Konnaiyur Mariamman kovil festival will be celebrated in grand manner. Flowers will be dedicated to deity and "Naadu" procession will be performed by all the villages around Ponnamaravathi. Malayandi kovil festival and Pattamarathaan Kovil festival celebrated every year in a grand manner.

Fish catching festivals at inland waterbodies are conducted frequently. Araliparai and Edayathoor Jalikattu is also a famous celebration.

== Notable people ==
Dr.Palaniappan Manickam (Famously known as Gutman or Dr.pal) - Gasteroenterologist, Influencer.

Valayapatti A.R.Subramaniam - Padma Shri awardee. For his contributions in music field. Excels in thavil playing.
