= Indian tax forms =

Indian tax forms document information in compliance with the Income Tax Act of 2025 and the Income Tax Rules, 2026, which govern income tax return filing in India.

== Forms ==
=== Form 10BA ===
Form 10BA is a declaration form that is used by a certain section of assessees while filing income tax returns in India. The form is a declaration by the assessee. The format is specified by the Income Tax Department of India.

Form 10BA applies to a certain section of assessees who are required to claim deductions under section 80GG. This declaration is filed by the assessee himself. Rule 11B specifically applies to the use of Form 10BA.

==== 10BA components ====
Form 10BA has a limited number of details to be filled in by the assessee wishing to make a declaration towards claiming a deduction as per Section 80GG.

- Name and permanent account number (PAN) of the assessee
- Financial year
- Complete address of the place of residence
- Tenure in months
- Financial details of rent including amount and whether paid in cash, crossed cheque, or demand draft
- Name and complete address of the landlord of the mentioned residence

==== Declaration of the assessee ====
Through Form 10BA the assessee also makes a declaration that no other residential property is owned by the assessee, the assessee's spouse, the assessee's minor child, and in the case of a Hindu undivided family, by a family member in the place where the assessee resides or carries out his business or profession.

=== Form 15CA ===
Form 15CA is a form used during the process of remittance to a foreign entity and is required to be presented as per rules laid down by the Income Tax Act of 1961. This form is directly related to the process of making a payment to a non-resident entity and deduction of Tax Deduction at Source (TDS) on the payment made, at the rates in force at the time.

As per Sub-Section (6) of Section 195 of the Income Tax Act of 1961, Form 15CA is required to be presented to the Reserve Bank of India before a remittance is made. It relates to the remittance of payment that is made to a non-resident individual or a foreign company.

NOTE: 15CA form filing is only processed, if it is accompanied by a 15CB certificate from an authorized chartered accountant (CA) in practice. Whereas, there are specific conditions as per rule 37BB of the Income Tax Act 1961, where there is no requirement to obtain certificate from Chartered Accountant (CA) in practice.

==== Information included ====
The first section contains the name and additional information of the remitter. The PAN number and the TAN number along with the address of the remitter are required to be furnished. The principal place of business is also required to be mentioned.

The second section contains details of the recipient of the remittance. The name, the complete postal address, details of the place of business, the PAN number, as well as the name of the country to which the remittance has been made are required to be mentioned. The status of the entity, whether it is a company, a firm, or others, is represented by the numerals 1, 2, and 3.

The third section refers to details of the accountant. The name of the accountant, the name of the firm or proprietorship concern the accountant is representing, the address, the registration number and the certificate details are mentioned here. The certificate number and the date of the certificate are important mentions in this section.

==== Guidelines ====
Form 15CA is required to be duly filled out, signed, and submitted to the Reserve Bank of India or an authorized dealer before the remittance mentioned is made.

The form is also required to be furnished at the official website of the Tax Information Network.

The details in the form should be valid, especially in the case of the PAN and TAN number. The details for the remitter, the remittance, and the recipient of the remittance are required to be mentioned.

The accountant handling the furnishing of the form and the accompanying TDS certificate should be fitting the definition laid down by Section 288 of the Income Tax Act of 1961.

=== Form 15G and 15H ===
Form 15G and 15H are self-declaration forms that an individual submits to the bank to request that TDS on interest income for that financial year not be deducted because their income falls below the basic exemption limit. Form 15H is to be filled by resident individual with an age 60 years or above i.e. senior citizens and form 15G can be filled out by a resident individual, a HUF, a trust, or any other assessee, but not by a company or a firm under the age of 60 years.

In general cases, banks are liable to charge TDS (Tax Deducted at Source) on the interest amount being paid on FD (Fixed Deposit) upon maturity. Form 15G is a self-declaration form that can be filed by a bank FD holder of age less than 60 years for getting a rebate from TDS on FD interest. Form 15H is similar to Form 15G, except for the fact that the Form 15H is to be filed only by senior citizens of age 60 years or more. To be eligible to file this form, the tax liability of the person must be nil for the particular fiscal year.

=== Form 16 ===
A Form 16 is a certificate issued to salaried class to acknowledge the deduction of TDS from their salary by the employer. It must be issued by 15 June of the following year for which it is being issued. Further, if any employer delays or fails to issue Form 16 by 15 June, then he shall have to pay a penalty of Rs. 100 per day till the time the default continues. The Form is especially important to employees working in a company or firm.

==== Features ====
The following features make Form 16 an important part of the entire process of filing Income Tax Returns in India:-

- It is applicable to salaried personnel
- It is a Tax Deduction at Source (TDS) Certificate issued by the employer
- It acts as proof that the employer has deducted TDS while paying the employee
- It is proof of the salary that the employee receives
- It reflects the amount of income tax paid by the employer on behalf of the employee
- It can be used by the employee as proof of his Income if the Income Tax Department wishes to scrutinize the income tax returns in detail
- Only an employer with a TAN (Tax Deduction Account Number) is eligible to deduct TDS, and therefore issue a Form 16
- If TDS is not deducted the employer is not under obligation to issue a Form 16 to the employee
- If TDS is deducted, the responsibility to issue the Form 16 to the employee lies with the employer

==== Important components ====
Following are few key components that are found in Form 16:

- Personal details of the employee including name, Permanent Account Number (PAN) etc.
- Employer details including name, permanent account number (PAN), TAN etc.
- Acknowledgement number of the income tax payment made by the employer
- Details of salary including gross salary, net salary, perquisites, deductions etc.
- Total income and total tax deducted
- Details of education cess or surcharge
- Tax deducted as per Section 191A
- Receipt number of the TDS payment
- Balance tax payable by the employee or refundable to the employee
- Details of tax payment including cheque number, DD number, voucher number, challan number etc.
- Declaration of tax payment by the employer

==== Responsibilities ====
Of the employer related to Form 16

Form 16 is an important document and Employers are especially required to ensure that every rule related to it is followed meticulously. This is not only in the interest of the Employer and Employee but is also required by law under the Income Tax Act, 1961.

- The signing authority on Form 16 should be a responsible person of the company or firm
- The salary, deductions, and other financial details should be calculated carefully
- In case of errors, rectifications should be made and a fresh Form 16 issued
- The tax deducted from employees should be paid to the government in time
- The PAN and TAN details should be filled in correctly
- The receipt, voucher or challan number of the tax paid to the government should be filled in correctly
- Employees should be issued the duly completed Form 16 well in time to file their tax returns with the Income Tax Department

Of the employee related to Form 16

Though the onus of providing the Form 16 document lies with the employer, the employee is also required to fulfill certain conditions.

- Collecting Form 16 from the employer well in time to file income tax returns with the Income Tax Department
- Checking if the details related to name, PAN etc. are entered correctly
- Checking details related to salary, deductions, education cess etc.
- Checking deductions under 80C, 80CCC, and 80CCD
- In case of discrepancies bringing them to the notice of the employer and getting them corrected
- Keeping Form 16 safely as proof for the details filled in while filing income tax returns

=== About Form 22 ===
Form 22 relates to the tax deducted at source on an approved superannuation fund set up for the benefit of employees. This amount is exempt from taxes if the payment is made on death, retirement, or in lieu of or as an annual payment.

Form 22 is related to the superannuation fund (SAF) and is governed by the rules and regulations laid down by the Fourth Schedule of the Income Tax Act of 1961. It is the statement of tax deducted at source (TDS) from the amount that is being repaid to employees with relations to a superannuation fund.

==== Components ====
Form 22 is related to the Tax Deducted at Source in the event of payments being made from a superannuation fund. This form is valid only in the case of the fund being an approve done.

- The form is required to reveal a range of information such as
- The name of the superannuation fund
- The details of the Employee such as his name and address
- The time period for which a contribution has been made towards the fund by the employer
- The breakup of the principal amount and the accrued interest
- The average rate of deduction of tax for the previous three years
- The total amount of tax that was deducted when the repayment was done
- A declaration by the trustees of the fund stating that the details furnished in the form are accurate

==== Laws related to Form 22 and superannuation funds ====
The use of Form 22 and the rules and regulations related to a superannuation fund is related but not restricted to the following laws

- Section 17 Sub-Section (2) of the Income Tax Act, 1961 related to the amount contributed by the employer being taxable at the employees end if it exceeds an amount of INR 100,000
- Section 36 Sub-Section (1) (iv) where the contribution of the employer is treated as a business expense
- Section 10 Sub-Section (13) where the benefits are paid due to the death of the employee is exempt from taxes

=== About Form 2E ===
Form 2E is a document used by a certain section of assessees in India to file their income tax returns. The Income Tax Department of India clearly specifies the use of this form and lays down the associated rules as to its functions through the Income Tax Act of 1961 and the Income Tax Rules of 1962.

Form 2E is part of the process of filing of income tax returns in India. The form is also known as the NAYA SARAL Form or ITS-2E. The Income Tax Act, 1961, and the Income Tax Rules, 1962, lay down the rules and regulations regarding Form 2E. The specific rule that applies to the use of Form 2E can be found in the second proviso to Rule 12(1)(b)(iii) of the Income Tax Rules, 1962.

Though most of the forms involved in the process of filing tax returns in India do not allow the attachment of any documents as annexure, Form 2E is required to be submitted in duplicate and also requires to be attached to the relevant document.

==== Eligibility of assessees ====
Form 2E should be used to file income tax returns only by those assessees who are resident individuals and Hindu undivided families (HUFs). Only those assessees who do not have any income from a business or profession or through capital gains or agricultural income are eligible to use the Form 2E to file tax returns. Therefore, Form 2E can be used only by Individuals and HUFs who earn their income through salary, house property, and other specific legitimate sources.

==== Attachments ====
Form 2E is one of the few income tax return forms that has provisions for the attachment of documents along with the form during submission to the Income Tax Department of India. Form 16 and the respective challans for the Advance Tax paid and the Self Assessment Tax paid may be attached to the form.

==== Submission ====
Form 2 is required to be filled in duplicate. Upon submission to the Income Tax Office, one copy is returned to the assessee upon acknowledgment. This acknowledgment is to be treated as intimation and a separate intimation is forwarded to the assessee only if a refund is to be made or if the assessee makes a special demand for intimation.

=== About 3CA ===
Form 3CA is a document used in the process of filing income tax returns in India. The document is Audit Report and is in accordance with the format specified by the Income Tax Department of India.

The Income Tax Department of India has a list of forms that are to be used by assessees when filing income tax returns. The Income Tax Act, 1961, and the Income Tax Rules, 1962, lay down the rules related to the use of each of these forms.

Form 3CA is an audit report and is submitted when the business or profession of the assessee goes through an audit by a chartered accountant recognized by law. This use of the Form is governed by the rules and regulations that are laid down under Section 44AB of the Income Tax Act, 1961. Rule 6G(1)(a) of the Income Tax Rules, 1962, lays down the rules for use of the form.

==== 3CA components ====
Form 3CA has important components that are necessary to gain details of the audit that the business or profession has been subjected to.

- The form has details of the firm on which the audit has been carried out including the name and the permanent account number (PAN)
- The details of the chartered accountant, whether it is an individual, a group of individuals, or a firm is given
- The year in which the audit is carried out
- A declaration by the chartered accountant confirming that the details were given and the corresponding annexure is true and correct
- The name and signature of the chartered accountant.

==== Details related to chartered accountants ====
The Income Tax Act, 1961, and the Income Tax Rules, 1962 clearly state the following with regards to the signing authority for Form 3CA.

- The chartered accountant should be one as per the rules and provisions of the Chartered Accountants Act, 1949 (38 of 1949).
- The auditor could also be a person who is entitled to act as an Auditor of Companies registered in the State by the provisions of Sub-Section (2) of Section 226 of the Companies Act, 1956 (1 of 1956).
- The auditor could also be a person who through the rules laid down by any other law is eligible to audit the accounts of the assessee.
- If any of the requirements laid down are unfulfilled, the reasons for the same should be specified.
- The auditor signing the Form 3CA should specify all his relevant details such as Membership Number or Certificate of Practice Number or the authority under which he is entitled to serve as an auditor and signing authority of the form.

=== About 3CB ===
Form 3CB is the specified format of an audit report as per the rules laid down by the Income Tax Department of India. The use of the form applies only to a certain section of assessees as per a set of rules and provisions related to the process of filing tax returns.

Form 3CB is associated with certain processes associated with the filing of income tax returns in India. The rules and regulations of the Income Tax Act, 1961, and the Income Tax Rules, 1962, govern the process of filing tax returns with the Income Tax Department of India and Form 3CB is particularly governed by the provisions of Rule 6G(1)(b). The form is an audit report for a person as per Clause (b) of Sub Rule (1) of Rule 6G under the provisions of Section 44AB of the Income Tax Act, 1961.

==== Applicability of Form 3CB ====
Form 3CB is an audit report required to be submitted by an auditing authority on behalf of a person who operates a business or profession and is not required to get the accounts of the enterprise audited as per any other law except the Income Tax Act, 1961.

==== Components of 3CB ====
The various components of Form 3CB are majorly declarations by the chartered accountant or auditing authority who has examined the books of the assessee and declares his findings.

- A declaration that the balance sheet for the financial Year as well as the profit and loss account or income and the expenditure account has been examined. This section also carries the details of the assessee including the name, address, and permanent account number (PAN).
- A certification stating that the balance sheet, the profit and loss account or income and the expenditure account are in accordance with the books of accounts maintained at the Head Office of the enterprise. This section specifies the head office address as well as the branch addresses.
- A report by the auditing authority giving a detailed observation, comments, discrepancies, or inconsistencies if there are any.
- The auditing authority is also required to declare that every associated information and explanation has been included in the audit report in the format of Form 3CB.
- The form also contains declarations by the auditing authority stating that the books of accounts have been maintained properly at the head office and branch offices and that the books have been thoroughly examined.
- The auditing authority is also required to declare that the furnished information gives a fair and correct outline of the balance sheet and general state of affairs at the enterprise, and also that the profit and loss account as well as surplus or deficit of the assessee is correct.
- There is a reference to Form 3CD which is the annexure under the provisions of Section 44AB stating that the details are correct.
- The last section contains the name, address, and signature of the auditing authority.

=== Form 3CD ===
Form 3CD is a format of the Audit Report required to be filed by tax auditors of a certain section of Assessees in India. The Income Tax Department of India clearly lays down the rules associated with the use of this form.

Form 3CD is a Form in accordance with Rule 6G(2) and Section 44AB of the Indian Income Tax Act, 1961. The Form is a part of the process of filing Income Tax Returns in India and is an Annexure to the Audit Report. Form 3CD contains 41 Clauses.

==== Preparation of Form 3CD ====
The Form 3CD is to be checked by the Tax Auditor and then submitted to the Tax Auditing Authority. The Auditing Authority then verifies and authenticates the furnished information. The Management of the enterprise is responsible for preparation of Form 3CD.

=== About 3CE ===
Form 3CE is a prescribed format for an Audit Report and is part of the process of filing Income Tax Returns for a certain section of Assessees in India. The Income Tax Department of India specifies the use of the Form and various rules and regulations are associated with it.

The Income Tax Act, 1961, and the Income Tax Rules, 1962, govern the process of filing Income Tax Returns in India. Form 3CE is a part of this process and is an Audit Report format and is required by Section 44DA.

Section 44DA Sub-Section 2 of the Income Tax Act, 1961, and Rule 6GA are specifically related to the use of Form 3CE.

==== Application of Form 3CE ====
Form 3CE is an Audit Report that is required to be submitted by non-residents or a foreign company doing business in the Indian Territory. These Assesses are required to maintain proper Books of Accounts and other documents for verification by a qualified Accountant or Auditing Authority. The Accounts should be Audited and presented along with the Income Tax Returns. The Audit Report, in this case, should be in the format specified in Form 3CE.

==== Components of Form 3CE ====
There are key components that are present in the format of Form 3CE.

- The Name and Address of the non-resident along with the Permanent Account Number (PAN). The same section also carries the Address of the permanent establishment or fixed place of a profession in the Indian Territory.
- A declaration by the Auditing Authority stating that every necessary information related document and explanation have been duly verified. The declaration also announces the Auditing Authority's method to determine the Income of the Assessee through Royalty or Fees for the technical services offered.
- A declaration that the mentioned Right of Property or Contract with relation to the Royalty or Fees offered in lieu of technical services is related to the permanent establishment or fixed place of a profession in the Indian Territory.
- The Form also clearly declares the Amount in the form of Royalty or Fees under Section 44DA of the Income Tax Act, 1961. The Assessment Year is also mentioned in this section.
- There is also a declaration regarding the Annexure to Form 3CE that specifies the details of the Royalty or Fees that the non-resident has earned by offering Technical Services.

==== Annexure ====
Form 3CE is attached with an Annexure that gives a detailed account of the Royalty or Fees that a Non Resident may have earned by way of offering Technical Services.

Part A of the Annexure specifies details regarding the non-resident Assessee including Name, Address of the enterprise in India, permanent account number (PAN), Assessment Year and Status.

Part B specifies details of the Books of Accounts and as to whether they were duly verified or not. The names of the Books of Accounts, as well as the Method of Accounting, is mentioned in this section

Part C includes a copy of the Agreement with the Indian Government or the concerned body in India. Other details like the Nature of the Technical Services, details of Expenditure or Allowance, Nature of the connection of the said earnings with the place of business in India are also mentioned in this section.

== See also ==
- Taxation in India
- Income-tax Act, 2025
