= Insurance Repository in India =

Database of insurance policies in India

The Insurance Repository in India is a database of insurance policies. It allows policy holders to make revisions to a policy. It launched on 16 September 2013. It is the world's first of its kind.

India's Insurance Regulatory and Development Authority originally issued licenses to five entities to act as Insurance Repositories; however, SHCIL Projects Limited surrendered its Insurance Repository license in September 2015. The remaining four are:

- CDSL Insurance Repository Limited (CDSL IR)
- Karvy Insurance Repository Limited
- National Insurance-policy Repository by NSDL Database Management Limited
- CAMS Insurance Repository Services Limited

All such entities must contain the words "Insurance Repository" in their names.
