= Income Computation and Disclosure Standards =

Income Computation and Disclosure Standards (ICDS) were issued by the Government of India in exercise of powers conferred to it under section 145(2) of The Income Tax Act, 1961.

The Ministry of Finance published 14 draft ICDS, out of which 10 ICDS were notified by the government on 31 March 2015. The government specified a deferment of one year from the date of implementation of these standards; the notified ICDS will be applicable from the financial year 2016-17.

ICDS were issued with the aim of bringing uniformity in accounting policies governing computation of income in accordance with tax related provisions, and also reducing the irregularities amongst them. The ICDS were developed using Generally Accepted Accounting Principles (GAAPs) with assistance from the Institute of Chartered Accountants of India.

The Form 3CD (Tax Audit Report) is already been revised for making mandatory disclosures in compliance with ICDS.

== History ==
The Central Board of Direct Taxes (CBDT) formed an Accounting Standards Committee which had earlier issued draft of 14 Tax Accounting Standards in 2012. On the basis of suggestions and comments received from stakeholders, CBDT revised and issued a 12 draft ICDS for public opinion. On 31 March 2015 the government issued 10 out of those 12 drafts.

== Applicability ==
ICDS are to be followed by all assesses, except individual or Hindu Undivided Family who are not covered under tax audit provisions, following Mercantile System of accounting.

== List of Income Computation and Disclosure Standards ==
ICDS NO.	Name of the Standard	Corresponding AS	Corresponding Ind AS
ICDS I	Accounting Policies	AS 1	Ind AS 1
ICDS II	Valuation of Inventories	AS 2	Ind AS 2
ICDS III	Construction Contracts	AS 7	Ind AS 115
ICDS IV	Revenue Recognition	AS 9	Ind AS 115
ICDS V	Tangible Fixed Assets	AS 10	Ind AS 16
ICDS VI	The Effects of Changes in Foreign Exchange Rates	AS 11	Ind AS 21
ICDS VII	Government Grants	AS 12	Ind AS 20
ICDS VIII	Securities	AS 13	Ind AS 32, 107 and 109
ICDS IX	Borrowing Costs	AS 16	Ind AS 23
ICDS X	Provisions, Contingent Liabilities and Contingent Assets	AS 29	Ind AS 37

== Miscellaneous provisions ==
- For the sake of be-verity and for the ease of tax payers, the notification provided several transitional provisions for the purpose of application of ICDS.
- Noncompliance of ICDS could result in best judgement assessment by tax authorities, which may lead to protracted litigations.

== See also ==
- Income tax in India
