= Angel One (company) =

Indian stockbroking private firm

Angel One Limited
- Trade name: Angel One
- Type: Public
- Traded as: BSE: 543235; NSE: ANGELONE
- ISIN: INE732I01013
- Industry: Financial services
- Founded: 8 August 1996; 30 years ago
- Founder: Dinesh D. Thakkar
- Headquarters: Ackruti Trade Center, Andheri (E), Mumbai, Maharashtra, India
- Area served: India
- Key people: Dinesh Thakkar (Chairman & MD)
- Revenue: ▲₹4,272 crore (US$440 million) (2024)
- Operating income: ▲₹1,693 crore (US$180 million) (2024)
- Net income: ▲₹1,126 crore (US$120 million) (2024)
- Total assets: ▲₹13,253 crore (US$1.4 billion) (2024)
- Total equity: ▲₹3,037 crore (US$320 million) (2024)
- Number of employees: 3,823 (31 March 2025)
- Subsidiaries: Angel Financial Advisors Pvt. Ltd.; Angel Fincap Pvt. Ltd.; Angel Securities Ltd.; Angel Wellness Pvt. Ltd.; Mimansa Software Systems Pvt. Ltd.
- Website: www.angelone.in

Angel One Limited, formerly known as Angel Broking Limited, is an Indian stockbroker firm established in 1996 and headquartered in Andheri, Mumbai.

The company is a member of the Bombay Stock Exchange, National Stock Exchange of India, National Commodity & Derivatives Exchange Limited and Multi Commodity Exchange of India Limited. It is a depository participant with Central Depository Services Limited (CDSL).

== History ==
Angel Broking was incorporated on 8 August 1996 as a private limited company. Later, Angel Broking was incorporated as a wealth management, retail and corporate broking firm in September 1997. In November 1998, Angel Capital and Debt Market Ltd. gained membership of National Stock Exchange as a legal entity. The company opened its commodity broking division in April 2004.

The International Finance Corporation bought an 18% stake in Angel Broking for ₹152 crore (equivalent to ₹501 crore or US$52 million in 2026) in December 2007.

In January 2013, a probe found the company and two other entities involved in fraudulent and unfair trade practices in transactions of shares of Sun Infoways during February-May 2001. As a result, SEBI restrained the company from taking new clients for a period of two weeks. Angel filed an appeal against the SEBI order which was dismissed by the Securities appellate tribunal.

Angel Broking began offered shares through an initial public offering in September 2020, and was listed on the Bombay Stock Exchange and the National Stock Exchange on 5 October 2020.

The company rebranded as Angel One in 2021.
