= Protean eGov Technologies =

Indian government technology company

- Type: Public
- Traded as: BSE: 544021
- ISIN: ISIN: INE004A01022
- Industry: Digital public infrastructure, Artificial intelligence, SaaS, Cloud, IT services & consulting, Fintech, RegTech, eCommerce
- Founded: 1995
- Headquarters: Lower Parel, Mumbai, India
- Area served: Worldwide
- Key people: Ajay Rajan (Managing Director & CEO)
- Services: Aadhar Seva Kendra (ASK); Digital Public Infrastructure (DPI); e-Governance Solutions; Permanent Account Number (PAN); National Pension Scheme (NPS); Tax Information Network (TIN)
- Number of employees: 1,081
- Subsidiaries: Protean Account Aggregator Limited; Protean International DMCC
- Website: Official website

Protean eGov Technologies Limited is an Indian technology company headquartered in Mumbai. The company focuses on developing digital public infrastructure (DPI) and e-governance initiatives for various governmental bodies in India.

It works with central and state governments across multiple sectors including Tax Services (PAN, TIN, eTDS), Social Security and Welfare (CRA for NPS & APY), ID and Data Stack, Open Digital Ecosystem, and Cloud.

In 2011, the company was appointed as a registrar for the Unique Identification Authority of India (UIDAI) to issue Aadhaar numbers to residents of the country. The company holds a 97% market share in NPS and 100% in APY Pension schemes, and a 54% market share in PAN related services.

== History ==
National Securities Depository Limited (NSDL) e-Governance Infrastructure Limited (now Protean eGov Technologies Limited) was originally incorporated on 27 December 1995 under The enactment of Depositories Act, December 1995 by Government of India, as NSDL e-Governance Infrastructure Limited, a depository registered with the Securities and Exchange Board of India (SEBI). In 1996, the company received a certificate for the commencement of business from the Registrar of Companies (RoC). It was the first and largest depository in India and has been involved in the development and implementation of various technology infrastructure projects in the country.

In 2004, the company launched initiatives such as the Tax Information Network (TIN), Pan Card Issuance, and Online Tax Accounting System (OLTAS). In 2005, it launched the Electronic Accounting System in Excise and Service Tax (EASIEST) and began managing it on behalf of the Central Board of Excise and Customs. The company also manages the Tax Information Network (TIN) for the Income Tax Department, Government of India. As part of this system, Protean facilitates the issuance of Permanent Account Number (PAN) cards and enables electronic submission of Tax Deducted at Source (TDS) returns, along with assisting banks in uploading tax payment data.

In 2008, the company was appointed by the Pension Fund Regulatory and Development Authority (PFRDA) as the Central Recordkeeping Agency (CRA) for the National Pension System of the Government of India. The company has developed and implemented 19 projects across seven ministries in India. These projects included modernizing the direct tax infrastructure through initiatives such as Permanent Account Number (PAN) issuance and the Tax Information Network and enabling a universal social security system for all Indians under the Atal Pension Yojana.

In 2011, the Unique Identification Authority of India (UIDAI) appointed the company as a Registrar for the implementation of the UID mission in India, and in 2013, the company launched e-KYC services.

=== Formation of NSDL e-Governance Infrastructure Ltd. ===
In 2012, NSDL transferred its depository business, including services under the Depositories Act, to its former subsidiary, NSDL Depository Limited. Later that year, in December, NSDL rebranded as NSDL e-Governance Infrastructure Limited as part of this business restructuring. The company was subsequently rebranded again as Protean eGov Technologies Limited to reflect its broader focus on IT services and expansion into new areas. The company is backed by the National Stock Exchange (NSE), Industrial Development Bank of India (IDBI), and Unit Trust of India (UTI), with shareholders including banks like Canara Bank, HSBC, Citicorp Finance India, Standard Chartered Bank, Mauritius-based fund Soach Global, State Bank of India, Union Bank of India, and Deutsche Bank AG.

=== Rebranding to Protean eGov Technologies Limited ===
In 2021, the company rebranded itself to Protean eGov Technologies Limited and launched its subsidiary, Protean InfoSec Services Limited. In 2023, Protean received approval from the Reserve Bank of India (RBI) to operate as an Account Aggregator (AA).

The company expanded its operations into the digital commerce sector by joining the Open Network for Digital Commerce (ONDC) and launched a marketplace called Rise with Protean, which focuses on APIs, microservices, and related areas. In April 2024, 360 One WAM (formerly IIFL Wealth Management) sold a 5.3% stake in Protean through open-market transactions.

Protean finished its initial public offering (IPO) in November 2023 and was added to the BSE and NSE.

== Partnerships ==
Protean was a founding member in establishing ONDC under the Department for Promotion of Industry and Internal Trade (DPIIT)'s leadership. In 2023, Protean announced a collaboration with Google Cloud to deploy DPI across public and private sectors. Protean teamed up with NPCI Bharat BillPay (NBBL) to develop a decentralized settlement system for participants in digital commerce.

In 2024, Protean signed an agreement with ArcelorMittal Nippon Steel India (AM/NS India) to support the 'Beti Padhao' scholarship initiative across multiple states in India. This initiative, started in March 2022 by AM/NS India, focuses on supporting underprivileged young women.

== Initiatives ==
In its 2015 Budget speech, then Finance Minister Arun Jaitley announced that the government would create a single-window electronic platform for providing education loans under the Pradhan Mantri Vidya Lakshmi Karyakram. VidyaLakshmi is an online platform for students seeking education loans. It was developed by Protean in 2015 under the guidance of the Department of Financial Services (Ministry of Finance), the Department of Higher Education (Ministry of Education), and the Indian Banks Association (IBA). By 2018, the platform had 34 banks and 86 loan schemes listed.

Protean also launched another portal called Vidyasaarathi, which is an education scholarship initiative allowing underprivileged students to receive financial assistance through corporate-funded scholarships. Vidyasaarathi announced its partnership with TATA Housing. In 2018, the company reported 28,000 registered students and nine participating companies, including ACC, Care Ratings, SNL Bearings, and Education Consultants of India.

In March 2026, the company hosted the inaugural Protean Digital Disruptors Awards in partnership with ETBrandEquity, recognizing leaders who utilize AI and DPI to drive systemic changes in the financial and regulatory sectors.

== Awards ==
=== 2024 ===
- Golden Peacock Award 2024 for ONDC
- Digital Responsibility Award in the category of 'E-Commerce Fairness by Internet and Mobile Association of India (IAMAI)
- Aegis Graham Bell Awards (AGBA) 2024
- Received the Best Digital Public Infrastructure (DPI) award at the Global Fintech Awards 2024

=== 2022 ===
- Golden Peacock Award
- Aegis Graham Bell Awards

=== 2018 ===
- Golden Peacock Award for Innovation Management
