= Permanent account number =

Code that acts as an identification for individuals, families and corporates

Permanent Account Number (PAN)
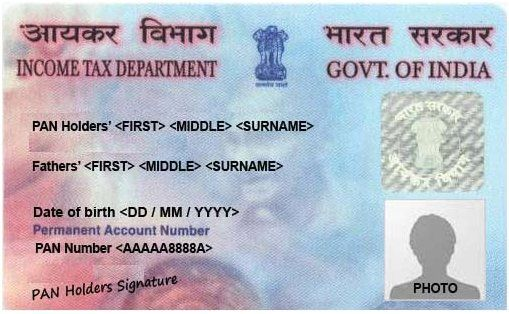
- Example of a PAN Card
- Type: Identity document
- Issued by: Income Tax Department
- First issued: 1972 (54 years ago)
- Purpose: Taxation, identification and age verification
- Valid in: India
- Eligibility: Resident of India
- Cost: ₹106.90 (US$1.10)
- Website: onlineservices.proteantech.in/paam/; www.pan.utiitsl.com/PAN/

A permanent account number (PAN) is a ten-character alphanumeric identifier, issued in the form of a polycarbonate card by the Income Tax Department in the Republic of India. It is issued to any person who applies for it or to whom the department allots the number without an application. It can also be obtained in the form of a PDF file known as an e-PAN from the website of the Indian Income Tax Department.

A PAN is a unique identifier issued to all judicial entities identifiable under the Indian Income Tax Act, 1961. The income tax PAN and its linked card are issued under Section 139A of the Income Tax Act. It is issued by the Indian Income Tax Department under the supervision of the Central Board for Direct Taxes (CBDT) and it also serves as an important proof of identification.

It is also issued to foreign nationals (such as investors) subject to a valid visa, due to which a PAN card is not acceptable as proof of Indian citizenship. A PAN is necessary for filing income tax returns (ITR). A PAN is mandatory to open a bank account in India.

== Structure ==
The PAN (or PAN number) is a ten-character alpha-numeric unique identifier.

The PAN structure is as follows:

- The first five characters are letters (in uppercase by default), followed by four numerals, and the last (tenth) character is a letter.
- The first three characters of the code are three letters forming a sequence of alphabetical letters from AAA to ZZZ
- The fourth character identifies the type of holder of the card. Each holder type is uniquely defined by a letter from the list below:

A — AOP (Association of persons)
B — BOI (Body of individuals)
C — Company
F — Firm
G — Government
H — HUF (Hindu Undivided Family)
L — Local authority
J — Artificial juridical person
P — Person (Individual)
T — Trust (AOP)

- The fifth character of the PAN is the first character of either of the first name, surname or last name of the person
- The last (tenth) character is an alphabetic digit used as a check-sum to verify the validity of that current code.
- Example: AAAPZ1234C

== Provisions ==
In recent times, the DOI (date of issue) of the PAN Card is the mentioned at the right (vertical) hand side of the photo on the PAN card if issued by NSDL (now rebranded as Protean eGov Technologies Limited) and will not be mentioned if issued by UTI-TSL.

The central government has introduced a new online service called "Know Your PAN", to for knowing your PAN number, verify your PAN for new and existing PAN numbers.

Failure to comply with the provisions of Section 139A of Income Tax Act, a penalty of ₹10,000/- for each default is payable u/s.272B to the assessing officer.

== Uses ==
The primary purpose of the PAN is to bring a universal identification to all financial transactions and to prevent tax evasion by keeping track of monetary transactions, especially those of high-net-worth individuals who can impact the economy. In Central Budget 2023, the government proposed to use PAN as a common identifier for all business establishments using digital systems of various government agencies.

Quoting the PAN is mandatory when filing ITR, tax deduction at source, or any other communication with the Income Tax Department. PAN is also steadily becoming a mandatory document for opening a new bank account, a demat account, a new landline telephone connection / a mobile phone connection, purchase of foreign currency, bank deposits above ₹50,000, purchase and sale of immovable properties, vehicles etc.

== Obtaining a PAN ==
Obtaining a PAN is optional or voluntary like a passport, driving license, Aadhaar etc. However, its use is mandatory for conducting for high-value financial transactions.

One can apply for PAN by submitting the prescribed PAN application to the authorized PAN agency of the district or through online submission to Protean eGov Technologies Limited (formerly NSDL e-Governance Infrastructure Ltd.) Protean, UTIITSL along with 2 recent passport size color photographs, proof of ID, Address and Date of Birth and fee. In case of re-print (re-issue), a photocopy of the old PAN is also required. It takes about 10–15 days to receive the card.

A user with an Aadhaar card can also submit e-KYC.

== Prescribed PAN application forms ==
There are two types of PAN applications:

1. Application for allotment of PAN: This application should be used when the applicants do not have any PAN allotted to them.
  Form 49A: - To be filled by Indian Citizens
2. FORM 49AA: - To be filled by foreign citizens.
3. Application for new PAN Card or/and Changes or Corrections in PAN Data: - Those who have already have a PAN and wish to obtain the new PAN card or want to make some changes/corrections in their PAN data, are required to submit their applications in the following form prescribed by ITD:
  REQUEST FOR NEW PAN CARD OR/AND CHANGES OR CORRECTION IN PAN DATA: - The same form can be used by Indians as well as foreign citizens for update of PAN data or Reprint of PAN Card. A new PAN card bearing the same PAN but updated information is issued to the applicant, in such a case.
4. PAN allotment based on Aadhaar is free of cost. A PAN PDF will be generated and issued to the applicant, and holds the same validity as a physical PAN card.

== Operating model ==
The issuance of PAN, verification, delivery and maintenance works on public-private partnership (PPP) model like Passport Seva Kendra (PSK) for reasons of economy, efficiency, and effectiveness. The reputed entities like Protean eGov Technologies Limited (formerly NSDL e-Governance Infrastructure Limited) and UTI Infrastructure Technology Services Limited (UTIITSL) have been entrusted by Income Tax Department as managed service providers for processing of applications, collecting, handling and verifying personal documents like proof of ID, age and address, clarification with the applicants, printing the card and the letter and then mailing it. The processing agencies obtain the new PAN number online from the server of the income tax department after successful processing of the application documents. Some critics in India may call the handling, processing, and delivery of personal ID and financial documents by private contractors as a violation of privacy.

Protean (formerly NSDL e-Gov) centres can be located at TIN website. It is now very easy to apply online using Aadhaar based eSignature at Protean's (formerly NSDL e-Gov) website. One can register first at Protean's website. After registration, the applicant receives a token number. One can continue with filling form. The applicant can save the details and complete the form at his convenience by logging using his/her registered details. One can upload photo/signature and supporting documents and finally eSign the application using Aadhaar and OTP. After successful eSign one can download and keep copy of the signed form for his reference. An acknowledgement receipt and form is also received through e-mail at registered email ID.

UTIITSL centres can be located at its website.

== PAN for foreign citizens ==
PAN is an important document for foreign citizens who wish to invest or undertake business in India. The procedure to obtain a PAN is the same as that for Indian citizens. However, the application is required to be filed using Form 49AA meant for foreign citizens and submitted at any of the authorized PAN Service Centres through an authorized representative in India.

Individuals and HUF

Documents accepted as proof of identity:

1. Copy of passport, or Voter's ID card
2. Copy of Person of Indian Origin (PIO) card issued by Government of India,
3. Copy of Overseas Citizen of India (OCI) card issued by Government of India,
4. Copy of other national or citizenship Identification Number or Taxpayer Identification Number duly attested by "Apostille" (in respect of countries which are signatories to the Hague Convention of 1961) or by the Indian Embassy or High Commission or Consulate in the country where the applicant is located or authorized officials of overseas branches of Scheduled Banks registered in India (in prescribed format).

Documents accepted as proof of address:

1. Proof of identity documents mentioned above bearing the address of the applicant or
2. Copy of bank account statement in the country of residence, or
3. Copy of non-resident external (NRE) bank account statement in India, or
4. Copy of certificate of residence in India or residential permit issued by the state police authorities, or
5. Copy of registration certificate issued by the Foreigner's Registration Office showing Indian address, or
6. Copy of visa granted and copy of appointment letter or contract from an Indian company and certificate (in original) of Indian address issued by the employer.

For other than individuals and HUF (including those having no office of their own in India)

Documents accepted as proof of identity and proof of address:

1. Copy of certificate of registration issued in the country where the applicant is located, duly attested by "Apostille" (in respect of the countries which are signatories to the Hague Convention of 1961) or by the Indian Embassy or High Commission or Consulate in the country where the applicant is located or authorized officials of overseas branches of Scheduled Banks registered in India (in prescribed format); or
2. Copy of registration certificate issued in India or of approval granted to set up an office in India by Indian Authorities.

At present, PAN Service Centres are located in India only. However, foreign citizens may find the pseudo online mode of application more inconvenient. Signed physical documents must be sent by postal mail or courier to the Protean (formerly NSDL eGov) PO Box in Pune (India) or UTIITSL address in Mumbai, New Delhi, Chennai, or Kolkata. The online facility allows payment of fees in INR using limited options of credit card for foreign citizens (only if they have India based credit card as international credit cards are not always accepted by the third party fee collectors.) Unlike most countries, India charges a fee to issue a TIN (PAN ID). The fees charges are ₹107 if the PAN card is to be received in India and ₹989 if the PAN Card is to be received at a foreign location. Note that the online application only eliminates data entry errors. One still needs to mail the application with photographs to India-based centers. The application requires two photographs. One on the top right requires a signature within the box below it. The other one on the top left requires a signature across the photograph (such that part of the signature is on the photograph and part on the form). There is anywhere from 2 to 20 days lag between your documents reaching the center and the initial processing/verification which only takes a day. The actual issue of PAN number by the tax department is within 48 hours. The actual PAN card is sent to the overseas address by the registered/certified mail and may take additional 2 weeks after the issue of the PAN number which is initially conveyed by email.

Although there are only 58 million income tax payers in India, yet there are 445 million genuine PANs issued as of 31 March 2019. While the alphanumeric PAN number is unique, individuals and corporate entities have been able to obtain multiple PAN cards fraudulently. It is illegal to obtain multiple PANs and there is a penalty of ₹10,000 (US$110) when caught. In addition, there are fake PAN cards due to ubiquitous plastic card printers. Additionally, illegal immigrants have also got PAN cards issued to them; most have used the services of PAN card agents.

There are only two entities in India that are authorized to accept PAN applications for processing on behalf of the Income Tax Department (India), i.e. Protean e-Gov Technologies Limited (formerly NSDL e-Governance Infrastructure Limited) & UTIITSL.

== See also ==
- India Stack
- Aadhaar
- Aadhaar-enabled service delivery
- Pension Fund Regulatory and Development Authority (National Pension Scheme & Permanent Retirement Account Number) (PRAN)
- Social Security Number (SSN) of USA
- International business identifiers (for corporate entities i.e. companies)
- Business Identifier Code (BIC/ISO 9362, identifier for corporate entities i.e. companies, trade, banking (SWIFT code, international Bank code, Bank International Code) etc.)
- Fringe Benefits Tax (India)
- Tax Deduction Account Number
- CIBIL
- Unified Payments Interface
