= CDS and Clearing Limited =

Central securities depository in Nepal

- Type: Subsidiary
- Industry: Central securities depository
- Founded: 2010; 16 years ago
- Headquarters: Putalisadak, Kathmandu, Nepal
- Area served: Nepal
- Key people: Kanchan Sapkota (Acting CEO)
- Products: Demat account, Transfer and Settlement of Securities
- Services: Depository services
- Owner: NEPSE (50.93%); Government of Nepal (49.0%)
- Website: cdsc.com.np

CDS and Clearing Limited (CDSC) is Nepal's central securities depository, clearing, and settlement company. It was established in 2010 by Nepal Stock Exchange (NEPSE) under the Companies Act and commenced operations in 2011. It plays a crucial role in the country's capital market by maintaining electronic records of securities and ensuring that stock market transactions are settled securely and efficiently.

Its services are related to dematerialization, transfer and settlement of securities in Nepal.

== History ==
The company is jointly owned by the Government of Nepal and Nepal Stock Exchange Limited (NEPSE). It operates under the Securities Act 2063 and the Company Act 2063 of Nepal.

As of 27 July 2026 CDSC has more than 8 million demat accounts.
