= SUGAM ITR-4S =

The SUGAM ITR-4S is a Form used by a certain section of Tax Assessees while filing their Income Tax Returns in India. The process of filing Tax Returns in the Indian subcontinent is done through various types of ITR and other Forms.

== SUGAM ITR-4S Form ==
The SUGAM ITR-4S Form is a Presumptive Income Tax Return Form and is part of the Income Tax Returns Filing process with the Income Tax Department of India. The Form is required to be filled out and submitted by those who are eligible to use it under the Income Tax Act, 1961, and the Income Tax Rules, 1962.

== Who can use ITR 4S Return Form? ==
This Return Form can be used by Individual/HUF whose total income for the assessment year 2015-16 includes:-

- Business income where such income is computed in accordance with special provisions referred to in section 44AD and 44AE (i.e. on presumptive basis)
- Income from salary/ Pension
- Income from one house property (excluding cases where loss is brought forward from previous years)
- Income from other sources (Excluding winning from lottery and income from race horses)

Further, in a case where the income of another person like spouse, minor child, etc. is to be clubbed with the income of the assessee, this Return Form can be used where such income falls in any of the above categories.

== Non Use of SUGAM ITR-4S Form ==
ITR-4S Profesional man work

Every Income Tax Return Form is applicable only to a certain section of Assessees and only those who are eligible to fill a particular form are allowed to do so. In the event that a wrong form has been filled out while filing Tax Returns, the form is liable to be rejected by the Income Tax Department of India.

An important factor to take note of before filing Income Tax Returns through the SUGAM ITR-4S Form is that this Form is not to be used by any Individual or Hindu Undivided Family that fulfills any of the following criteria

- Holds any assets outside the country
- Has any financial interest in a foreign entity
- Is a signing authority in any bank account that is located outside the Indian Territory
- ITR 4S has been released for AY 2014-15, 2015-16 and 2016-17 by Income Tax Department

== Eligibility for SUGAM ITR-4S Form ==
Individuals and Hindu Undivided Families who have earned their Income only through the following means only are eligible to use the SUGAM ITR-4S Form to file their Income Tax Returns:

- Earned Business Income that is computed in accordance with the special provisions as referred to in Section 44AD and 44AE of the Income Tax Act, with relation to the computation of income
- Earned Income through Salary and/or Pension
- Earned Income from one House Property, except where loss is carried forward from preceding years
- Income from other sources except for earnings through Lottery, Race horse winnings, Contests, and other legal means of gambling

== Non-eligibility for SUGAM ITR-4S Form ==
Individuals and Hindu Undivided Families who have earned any Income through the following sources are not eligible to fill the SUGAM ITR-4S

ted outside the Indian Territory

== Non Mandatory clauses for SUGAM ITR-4S Form ==
The SUGAM ITR-4S Form is not mandatory to be filed by the Individual or Hindu Undivided Family, in this case the Assessee, if the following is fulfilled

- All Books of Accounts and other documentation related to Business is maintained by the Assessee as per Section 44AA of the Income Tax Act
- An Audit of Accounts is carried out and the Audit Report for the Business is obtained in accordance to Section 44AB of the Income Tax Act

In such cases the Regular ITR-4 Form should be filed and not the SUGAM ITR-4S Form.
