= Tax Deduction and Collection Account Number =

Indian tax code number

In India, a Tax Deduction and Collection Account Number (TAN) is a 10 digit alpha-numeric number issued by the Income Tax Department to the persons who are required to deduct or collect tax on payments made by them under the Indian Income Tax Act, 1961.

== Significance ==
The Tax Deducted at Source (TDS) on payments made by assessees is deposited under the TAN to enable the assessees who have received the payments to claim the tax deducted in their income tax return.

== Application ==
TAN is applied through "Form No. 49B" (prescribed under Indian Income Tax Law). A completed form can be submitted online at the NSDL website or at the "Tax Information Network Facilitation Center" (TIN-FC). These centers are established by NSDL, an appointed intermediary by the Central Government, across India.

TAN is required to be quoted in all TDS/TCS returns, all TDS/TCS payment challans and all TDS/TCS certificates to be issued. TDS/TCS returns will not be accepted if TAN is not quoted and challans for TDS/TCS payments will not be accepted by banks. Failure to apply for TAN or not quoting the same in the specified documents attracts a penalty of ₹10,000

No documents are required to be filed with the application for allotment of TAN. However, where the application is online, the acknowledgment (a PDF file) which is generated after filling up the form must be forwarded to NSDL. Detailed guidelines for the procedure are available at NSDL website. A TAN application should accompany a 'proof of identity' and a 'proof of address' (photocopies) of the deductor. In the case of online applications, these documents need to be sent over mail (post/courier) to NSDL - TAN Application division.

When NSDL receives the TAN application along with said documents (either through TIN FC / Online), the details are verified and then sent to the Income Tax Department. Once approved, the Department allocates a unique number, and notifies the applicant through NSDL.

== Structure and validation ==
- TAN structure is as follows: RAJA99999B: First four characters are letters, next five are numerals, last character is a letter.
- Each tax deductor is uniquely identified by a TAN.
- The first three characters represent the city or state where the TAN was issued.
- The fourth character represents first character of the name (company, firm, individual, etc) of the deductor.
- And the next 5 characters are numerics.
- And Last character is a letter.

== Who can apply for TAN? ==
If one entity is paying salary or a commission to another, the entity must have a TAN. This might include:

- Individuals
- Hindu Undivided Family (HUF)
- Company and Firms
- Central or the state government
- Sole proprietor
- Associations of persons
- Trusts

== See also ==
- National Securities Depository Limited
