= Deficit (economics) =

In economics, deficit is the excess of an organization's expenditure over its revenue, such as in:

- Deficit spending, the amount by which spending exceeds revenue
- Government deficit spending: a negative government budget balance; fiscal deficit of that year= total borrowing by government
  - Primary deficit, the pure deficit derived after deducting the interest payments
  - Structural and cyclical deficit, parts of the public sector deficit
- Income deficit, the difference between family income and the poverty threshold
- Trade deficit, when the value of imports exceed the value of exports; a negative balance of trade

== See also ==
- Balance of payments deficit, when the balance of payments is negative
- Equity (finance) with a negative balance
