= Custodial participant =

A custodial participant is a person who confirms a stock exchange trade on behalf of his client.

== Explanation ==
When a client enters buy/sell order for trading on a stock exchange, the trading member or stockbroker receives his order and inserts it into the Stock Exchange Trading System. Once an order is confirmed i.e. when buy/sell part gets its corresponding sell/buy part, the trade is forwarded to the settlement system. During the settlement the custodial participant has to confirm that the order placed by the trading member on behalf of his client is valid and that the trade can occur. This helps trade verification for the client/investor and retains the interest of the investor in the market. After the trade occurs, the client or investor can also verify with the depository whether the shares have been allotted to him or not.

Similarly there is depository participant who provides depository services to the client/Investor
