= Income tax return (India) =

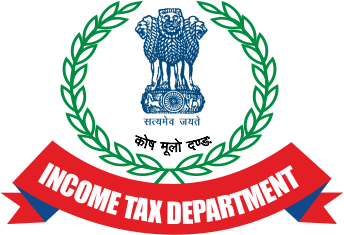
Income Tax Department

Income tax return is the form in which a person files information about their income and tax thereon to Income Tax Department. Various forms are ITR 1, ITR 2, ITR 3, ITR 4, ITR 5, ITR 6 and ITR 7. When you file a belated return, you are not allowed to carry forward certain losses.

The Income Tax Act, 1961, and the Income Tax Rules, 1962, obligates citizens to file returns with the Income Tax Department at the end of every financial year. These returns should be filed before the specified due date. Every Income Tax Return Form is applicable to a certain section of the Assessees. Only those Forms which are filed by the eligible Assessees are processed by the Income Tax Department of India. It is therefore imperative to know which particular form is appropriate in each case. Income Tax Return Forms vary depending on the criteria of the source of income of the Assessee and the category of the Assessee.

== Filing of income tax returns: obligation by law ==
Individuals who fulfil any one of the following conditions should by law file their Income Tax Returns during a financial year:

- People whose gross total income (before any deductions exceeds ₹2.5 lakh in FY or ₹3 lakh for senior citizens or ₹5 lakh for super senior citizens).
- Companies or firms irrespective of whether you have income or loss during the financial year.
- Those who want to claim an income tax refund.
- Those who want to carry forward a loss under a head of income.
- Resident individuals who have an asset or financial interest in an entity located outside of India. (Not applicable to NRIs or RNORs).
- Residents and signing authorities in a foreign account. (Not applicable to NRIs or RNORs).
- Those who derive income from property held under a trust for charitable or religious purposes or a political party or a research association, news agency, educational or medical institution, trade union, a not for profit university or educational institution, a hospital, infrastructure debt fund, any authority, body or trust.
- Foreign companies taking treaty benefit on a transaction in India.
- NRIs, who have income that exceeds ₹2.5 lakh in FY which is earned or accrued in India, are required to file an income tax return in India.

== Due date for filing returns ==
Due dates of filing income tax return for FY 2023-24 (AY 2024-25) are as under:

Particulars AY: 2019-20	Due Date
Individuals, HUF, BOI, AOP ( whose Books of Account are not required to be audited)	31 July of Assessment Year
Assessee who are required to furnish report under sec 92E [TRANSFER PRICING]	30 November of Assessment Year
Any assessee whose books of Account are required to be audited [ Other than assessee who is required to furnish report under section 92E]	31 October of Assessment Year

== Penalty on late filing of ITR (effective from 1 April 2018) ==
As per the new law from this year, Individuals will have to pay late fee after last date to file income tax return for the FY 2018-19

1. Rs· 5000 if tax is filed after due date of 31 August but on before 31 December of that assessment year (in this case 31 December 2019)
2. Rs· 10,000 if tax is filed after 31 December but on or before 31 March of the relevant assessment year (in this case from 1 January to 31 March 2020.
3. Rs· 1000 if total income does not exceeds Rs· 5,00,000

== Forms ==
=== ITR-1 ===
ITR-1 form is an essential Income Tax Return form for Indian citizens filing their tax returns with the Income Tax Department.

==== Eligible individuals for ITR-1 SAHAJ (Hindi terminology meaning 'easy') ====
Individuals who have earned their Income for a Financial Year only through the following means are eligible to fill the ITR-1 SAHAJ form.

- Through Salary or Pension
- Through One House Property (except in case of losses brought forward from preceding years)
- Through other sources apart from Lottery, Racehorses, Legal Gambling etc. Other sources include FD interest, spousal pension etc.

In case of clubbed Income Tax Returns, where a spouse or a minor . is included in the tax returns, this can be done only if their income too is limited to the specifications laid down above.

==== Non-eligible individuals for ITR-1 SAHAJ ====
Individuals who are not eligible to fill the ITR-1 SAHAJ form are those who have earned Income through the following means:

- Through more than one piece of Property
- Through Lottery, Racehorses, Legal Gambling etc.
- Through non tax-exempted capital gains, Short term as well as Long term
- Through exempted income exceeding Rs. 5000
- Through Business and Professions
- Loss under the head other sources
- Any Person claiming relief under section 90 and/or 91
- Having Total Income more than Rs 5 million
- If any Resident Individual who has any Income from any source outside India or has any asset outside India or has signing authority in any account located outside India

==== Submission of ITR-1 form ====
The form can be submitted physically at any Income Tax Returns Office. An Acknowledgment Receipt can be obtained upon submission.

In case of Electronic Filing of the form there are two alternatives. Firstly, if a Digital Signature is obtained, the Form is uploaded online. Secondly, the Form is downloaded, printed, signed, and a copy of the acknowledgement is sent by post to the Income Tax Department's office in Bengaluru.

ITRV can now be verified online using Unique Identification Authority of India Aadhaar Card or Electronic Verification Code (EVC). The EVC can be generated either via One Time Password sent to email and registered mobile number (if income is less than INR 500,000) or via Net Banking. After online verification Income Tax Assesses is not required to send ITRV to Bangalore CPC.

The ITR-2 is a Form used by Income Tax Assesses in India. The process of filing Tax Returns in India involves the use of various forms for different categories of Assesses and the ITR-2 is one such form.

=== ITR-2 Form ===
The ITR-2 Form is an important Income Tax Return form used by Indian citizens as well as Non Residents to file their Tax Returns with the Income Tax Department of India. The Income Tax Act, 1961, and the Income Tax Rules, 1962, require citizens to file their tax returns with the Income Tax Department at the end of every financial year and this form is a part of the filing process as specified by the Government of India.

The due date for filing return with the Income Tax Department of India is 31 July every year. This is subject to change only if a directive to this effect is issued by the Income Tax Department or the Ministry of Finance, India. The Financial Year ends on 31 March every year so Assessees have a period of four months to prepare their Income Tax Returns.

==== Eligibility for the ITR-2 Form ====
The use of the ITR-2 Form is applicable to the following means of income only. This form is available for both Individuals as well as Hindu Undivided Families. Individuals earning an income only through the following means are eligible to fill and submit the form to the Income Tax Department.

- Earning Income through a salary or pension
- Income through House Property.
- Earning Income through capital gains (Short Term and Long Term)
- Earnings through Other Sources (includes Income through Lottery Winnings, through bets on Racehorses, and other Legal methods of Gambling)

The Income Tax Returns, if clubbed together with that of a spouse, minor child etc. needs to ensure that their sources of income are similar to those stated above. Only then can their returns be filed together. A difference of earnings in even one category makes the Assessee liable to fill a separate and applicable Income Tax Returns Form.

==== Non-eligibility for the ITR-2 Form ====
- Any Individual or Hindu Undivided Family whose income, in whole or in part, is earned either through a Business or a Profession.
- Individuals who are eligible to fill the ITR-1 SAHAJ form.
- An individual who is designated as a partner in a Partnership Firm is not eligible to fill the ITR-2 Form.

==== Special concession for salaried personnel ====
Salaried personnel who earn an income of Rupees Five Lakh or less are exempted from filing Tax Returns as per the directive of the Income Tax Department of India. This rule however is only applicable to those who earn less than Rupees Ten Thousand as Income by way of Interest earned through their Savings Bank Accounts. Those who earn Rupees Ten Thousand or more are required to file their Tax Returns.

==== E-filing compulsory for a certain section of Income Earners ====
The Central Board of Direct Taxes (CBDT) has made it compulsory for Individual and Hindu Undivided Families earning an income in excess of Rupees Five Lakh to file their Tax Returns only through the E-Filing Process. The manual filing of returns is no more an option for Assessees who come under this category. Electronic Filing of their Tax Returns is the only way to file the income tax return for the Individual and HUFs

=== ITR-3 Form ===
The ITR-3 Form particularly applies to Individuals and Hindu Undivided Families (HUF) having income under the head profits or gains of business or profession and who is not eligible for filling ITR-1, ITR-2 or ITR-4.

==== Eligible Assessees for the ITR-3 Form ====
The eligibility criteria of every Income Tax Return form are governed by a set of rules and conditions. The ITR-3 Form is applicable only to those Individuals and Hindu Undivided Families that can be placed under the following categories

- Is a Partner in a firm
- Gains Income through ‘Profits or gains of business or profession’
- Gains Income by means of interest, salary, bonus, commission, remuneration, as a partner

If the partner of a firm only earns income from the firm as a share in the profits and not by any other means such as interest, bonus, salary, remuneration, or commission etc. then such an Individual or Hindu Undivided Family should file Income Tax Returns using only the ITR-3 Form, and not the ITR-2 Form.

==== Non-eligible Assessees for the ITR-3 Form ====
Individuals and Hindu Undivided Families who are not eligible to fill the ITR-3 Form are those who have earned Income through a Business or Profession operated as a Proprietorship firm. Assessees, who apart from being a partner in a firm, also have sources of income from a business or profession, including the speculation market, are also not eligible to file their Income Tax Returns through this form.

=== ITR-4 Form ===
The ITR-4 Form is applicable to those individual and Hindu Undivided Families who want to declare their income from Business or Profession under Presumptive Income Scheme of Income Tax under Section 44AD, Sec 44ADA and Section 44AE of the Income Tax Act.
