= Recognition of same-sex unions in Maharashtra =

Maharashtra does not recognise same-sex marriages or civil unions. However, live-in relationships are not unlawful in Maharashtra. The Indian Supreme Court has held that adults have a constitutional right to live together without being married, and that police cannot interfere with consenting adults living together. The Bombay High Court upheld this constitutional right in July 2023. In August 2025, a same-sex couple filed a writ petition with the High Court, arguing that tax provisions resulted in unequal economic treatment for same-sex couples and sought inclusion under the term "spouse" for tax benefits under the Income Tax Act.

== Legal history ==
=== Background ===
Marriage in India is governed under several federal laws. These laws allow for the solemnisation of marriages according to different religions, notably Hinduism, Jainism, Buddhism, Christianity, Islam, Sikhism and Zoroastriansim. Every citizen has the right to choose which law will apply to them based on their community or religion. These laws are the Hindu Marriage Act, 1955, the Indian Christian Marriage Act, 1872, the Muslim Personal Law (Shariat) Application Act, 1937, the Anand Marriage Act, 1909 and the Parsi Marriage and Divorce Act, 1936. The Special Marriage Act, 1954 (SMA; Marathi: विशेष विवाह कायदा, १९५४, Viśeṣ Vivāh Kāydā; Hindi: विशेष विवाह अधिनियम, १९५४, Viśeṣ Vivāh Adhiniyam) (Note: Bhili: वीवा कायडो, १९५४, Vīvā Kāydo; Korku: ब्याव नेजम, १९५४, Byāw Neyam) allows civil marriage officers to solemnize and register marriages for all Indian citizens regardless of the religion of either party. Although the vast majority of marriages in India continue to be solemnized and registered under the traditional religious personal laws, the SMA has become popular among interfaith couples, inter-caste couples, and spouses with no religious beliefs. None of these acts explicitly bans same-sex marriage.

On 14 February 2006, the Supreme Court of India ruled in Smt. Seema v. Ashwani Kumar that the states and union territories are obliged to register all marriages performed under the federal laws. The court's ruling was expected to reduce instances of child marriages, bigamy, cases of domestic violence and unlawful abandonment. Maharashtra had already passed a law requiring the registration of all marriages. In April 1999, Governor P. C. Alexander signed the Maharashtra Regulation of Marriage Bureaus and Registration of Marriages Act, 1998 into law. It created local registrars that issue marriage licenses to prospective spouses, though registrars may refuse to issue licenses if the parties fail to meet the requirements to marry under the federal marriage laws. It does not explicitly ban same-sex marriages, and defines marriage simply as including remarriage. However, the act generally refers to married spouses as "husband and wife"; it defines the "parties" to a marriage as "the husband and wife whose marriage has been solemnized".

Traditional Marathi marriages (विवाह, vivāh) are deeply rooted in custom and hold significant cultural importance. They involve elaborate pre-wedding preparations and culminate in key rituals, including the tying of the mangala sutra and the saptapadi. Arranged marriage remains the prevailing norm across India, accounting for the vast majority of unions, and often placing pressure on LGBT individuals to marry partners of the opposite sex. Nevertheless, some same-sex couples have participated in traditional marriage ceremonies, although these unions lack legal recognition in Maharashtra. In December 2017, a same-sex couple, 43-year-old IIT Bombay engineer Hrishi Sathawane and his 35-year-old partner of Vietnamese origin known only as Vinh, were married in a traditional Hindu ceremony in Yavatmal. The ceremony, which was attended by close friends and family members, involved an exchange of rings and garlands in accordance with Hindu custom. In February 2019, two men, Vinodh Philip and Vincent Illaire, held a traditional marriage ceremony in Mumbai with the exchange of garlands and the wearing of a mangala sutra and toe rings as symbols of marriage. In 2022, a lesbian couple, Dr. Paromita Mukherjee and Dr. Surabhi Mitra, were engaged in a private ceremony in Nagpur, though chose to have "big, fat, sea-side destination wedding" in Goa. The couple went public with the news of their wedding. Mukherjee said, "We are over the moon with the love we are garnering. Somewhere we knew that the society and its aware people will celebrate our love with us." Nevertheless, many gays and lesbians continue to marry partners of the opposite sex due to societal and family pressure. A 2009 report by the Humsafar Trust estimated that 70% of gay men in Mumbai and 80% in smaller cities across Maharashtra were married to women.

=== Live-in relationships ===
Recognition of same-sex unions in India

Live-in relationships (Marathi: सहवास संबंध, sahvāsa sambandha, pronounced [ˈsəɦʋaːsə ˈsəmbəndʱə], or लिव्ह-इन रिलेशन, livha-ina rileśana; Hindi: सहवास संबंध, sahvās sambandh) are not illegal in Maharashtra. The Indian Supreme Court has held that adults have a constitutional right to live together without being married, that police cannot interfere with consenting adults living together, and that live-in relationships are not unlawful. State courts have upheld this constitutional right, and further ruled that if a couple faces threats from family or the community they may request police protection. However, live-in relationships do not confer all the legal rights and benefits of marriage. In July 2023, the Bombay High Court ruled that same-sex live-in relationships are not unlawful. Judges Revati Mohite Dere and Gauri Godse ordered the police to provide security to two women who had chosen to live together against the wishes of one of their parents. Same-sex couples remain in a legal grey zone. While they may live together and seek police protection if necessary, they lack many of the rights, obligations, responsibilities and security of marriage.

In August 2025, a same-sex couple, Payio Ashiho and Vivek Divan, filed a writ petition, arguing that tax provisions resulted in unequal economic treatment for same-sex couples and sought inclusion under the term "spouse" for tax benefits under the Income Tax Act. In November 2025, the Bombay High Court refused interim relief in Payio Ashiho v. Union of India. The federal Income Tax Department argued that their relationship could not be recognised as a "marriage" under the Income Tax Act as "it was not similarly recognised under any marriage law in India". Further proceedings were held on 10 December 2025 and 9 July 2026.

=== Transgender and intersex issues ===
Like most of South Asia, Maharashtra recognizes a traditional third gender community known as hijra (हिजडा, hijḍā), historically holding respected community roles, and known for their distinct culture, communities led by gurus, and traditional roles as performers. There are also terms for eunuchs or transgender individuals in the languages of some Scheduled Tribes of Maharashtra, namely āḍigunllōḍ (आडिगुंल्‍लोड) in Gondi. Gondi transgender people are known for their important role as performers during the Dandari festival, though Gondi customs historically prevented them from marrying and inheriting land.

The Supreme Court's 2023 ruling in Supriyo v. Union of India held that the Indian Constitution does not require the legalisation of same-sex marriages but affirmed that transgender people may marry opposite-sex partners. Following the Supreme Court's ruling in Supriyo, five transgender women married their male partners in Pimpri-Chinchwad in January 2025 under the Hindu Marriage Act. Some couples had already married prior to the court ruling. Madhuri Sarode, a transgender woman, and Jay Kumar Sharma were married in a Hindu temple in Mumbai in December 2016 in one of the first transgender marriages in India "that was [not] held in secret". Another couple, Mahant Shivlakshmi and Sanjay Jhalte, were married in Nashik in 2021.

== Religious performance ==
Several same-sex couples have married in Hindu temples in Maharashtra. Family and community reactions have ranged from support to disapproval to violent persecution. In 2010, academic Ruth Vanita reported that many of these couples were "non-English-speaking young women from lower-income groups", and "[not] connected to any movement for equality; most of them were not aware of terms like "gay" or "lesbian". Many of them framed their desire to marry in terms drawn from traditional understandings of love and marriage, saying, for example, that they could not conceive of life without each other, and wanted to live and die together." The Catholic Church opposes same-sex marriage and does not allow its priests to officiate at such marriages. In December 2023, the Holy See published Fiducia supplicans, a declaration allowing Catholic priests to bless couples who are not considered to be married according to church teaching, including the blessing of same-sex couples. Archbishop Oswald Gracias responded to the declaration by calling it "an affirmation of our spirituality and a gift". Gracias said, "Our Indian mentality is so inclusive, understanding people of other religions and other faiths. All are searching for God, all are searching for the truth, all are searching for spirituality."

== See also ==
- LGBT rights in India
- Recognition of same-sex unions in India
- Supriyo v. Union of India
