= Sai Prasad Corporation =

Indian real estate developer

Sai Prasad Corporation Ltd
- Type: Public
- Industry: Real estate development, Construction, Food, Energy, Media
- Founded: 14 December 2011; 14 years ago
- Headquarters: Pune, India
- Key people: Balasaheb Bhapkar (Chairman); Shashank Bhapkar (MD); Vandana B. Bhapkar (Director)
- Website: www.saiprasadgroup.com

Sai Prasad Corporation Ltd. (SPCL) is an Indian real estate developer incorporated in 2011 and based in Pune, Maharashtra. It is associated with the Sai Prasad Group, whose business interests have included real estate and other sectors. The company has been the subject of regulatory proceedings by the Securities and Exchange Board of India (SEBI) concerning the collection of funds through unregistered collective investment schemes.

== Background ==
Sai Prasad Corporation was incorporated on 14 December 2011 under the Companies Act, 1956.

== Regulatory proceedings ==
In 2011, the Ministry of Corporate Affairs began investigating Sai Prasad Group for "alleged financial irregularities", according to Business Standard. In 2013, the investigation extended to the Securities and Exchange Board of India (SEBI), the Reserve Bank of India, and the economic offenses department of the police department in Goa. The company is alleged to have raised money for various businesses in an unauthorized manner. In July 2013, the SEBI ordered Sai Prasad Group to stop collecting money from the public, start any new business projects, or get rid of any assets. The company also charged Ram Oberoie and family with pocketing public funds worth 3550 crores. Sebi orders attachment of bank, demat a/cs of Sai Prasad Corp.

== Recovery proceedings ==
In October 2019, SEBI announced to auction around 200 properties of the group and three of its directories next month so as to recover funds worth thousands of crores raised by the group via illicit collective investment schemes.
