= United Western Bank =

Indian bank

United Western Bank (UWB) was an Indian bank founded in 1936 that IDBI Bank acquired in 2006 in a rescue. The Reserve Bank of India placed UWB under a moratorium to protect the interest of public and depositors as growing losses eroded its capital.

Annasaheb Chirmule, a leader of the Swadeshi movement, founded Satara Swadeshi Commercial Bank in 1907, and some three decades later founded United Western Bank. The bank was incorporated in 1936, and commenced operations the next year. UWB's head office was in Satara, in Maharashtra State. It became a Scheduled Bank in 1951.

In 1956, UWB acquired Union Bank of Kolhapur, which had been incorporated on 5 July 1949.

In 1961, UWB acquired Satara Swadeshi Commercial Bank. Established on 20 August 1907, this was the first bank established at Satara.

At the time of the merger with IDBI, UWB had some 230 branches spread over 47 districts in 9 states, controlled by five Zonal Offices at Mumbai, Pune, Kolhapur, Jalgaon, and Nagpur. By acquiring UWB, IDBI was able to increase its branch network from 195 to 425 branches.
