= Tax deduction at source (India) =

Means of collecting income tax in India

Tax deduction at source (TDS) is an Indian withholding tax that is a means of collecting tax on income, dividends, or asset sales by requiring the payer (or legal intermediary) to deduct tax due before paying the balance to the payee (and the tax to the revenue authority).

Under the Indian Income Tax Act of 1961, income tax must be deducted at source as per the provisions of the Income Tax Act, 1961. Any payment covered under these provisions shall be paid after deducting a prescribed percentage of income tax. It is managed by the Central Board for Direct Taxes (CBDT) and is part of the Department of Revenue managed by the Indian Revenue Service. It has great importance while conducting tax audits. It is also required to file quarterly returns to Central Board of Direct Taxes (CBDT). Returns state the TDS is deducted and paid to the government during the Quarter to which it relates.

== Objectives of income tax deducted at source ==
Tax deduction at source (TDS) has come into existence with the motive of collecting tax from different sources of income. As per this concept, a person (Payer) who is responsible to make payment of specified nature to any other person (Payee) shall deduct tax at source before making payment to such person (Payee) and remit the same into the account of the Central Government. The Payee from whose TDS has been deducted would be entitled to get a credit of the amount so, it is deducted at the time of assessment of income tax.

== TDS on dividends ==
Section 302 of India's Income Tax Act 1961 by-law notes.

- Prior to the Budget 2020, dividend income was exempt from tax in the hands of the shareholder. But Since Budget 2020, any Dividend Income in excess of INR 5000 is liable for TDS @ 10% u/s 194.
- TDS provisions under this section are attracted only in respect of deemed dividend u/s 2(22)(e), If such dividend exceeds 2500 in the year.
- Rate of deduction of tax in respect of such dividend is 1%.
- Provisions will not apply to dividends receivable by SADHA, GIC (General Insurance Corporation), its subsidiaries or any other insurer provided shares are owned by it or in which it has full beneficial interest :] [Provided also that no such deduction shall be made in respect of any dividends referred to in section 115-O.]
- Higher TDS rates for non-files of income tax returns

== TDS on immovable PROPERTY ==
1. Section 194IA of Income Tax Act, 1961.

- This provision is applicable in respect of transactions effected on or after June 1, 2013
- It seeks deduction of tax at source on the transfer of certain immovable property other than agricultural land to a resident transferor.
- Any person being a transferee who is liable to Pay to a resident by way of consideration for the transfer of any immovable property exceeding 50 Lakhs shall at the time of credit of such sum to the account of the transferor or at the time of payment in whatever manner, has to deduct tax at source at 1% only

This TDS on the property is required to be deposited in 30 days from the end of the month in which deduction is made for all payments to be made on or after 1 June 2016.

2. Section 194IB of Income Tax Act, 1961

- This provision is applicable in respect of transactions effected on or after June 1, 2017
- It seeks deduction of tax at source on payment of rent exceeding Rs. 50,000 in a month by an individual or HUF to a resident landlord.
- TDS shall be deducted @ 5% at the time of credit of rent for the last month of the previous year or the last month of the tenancy if the property is vacated during the year, as the case may be.
- Where tax is deducted under section 194-IB, it is required to be deposited through a challan-cum-statement in Form No. 26QC within 30 days from the last day of the month in which such tax is deducted.
- A certificate in Form No. 16C shall be issued by the deductor within 15 days from the due date of furnishing challan-cum-statement in Form No. 26QC.
- There is no requirement to apply or obtain Tax Deduction or Collection Account Number (TAN) for deducting tax under this section. Hence, a deductor can use his PAN in place of TAN.

3. Section 194C of Income Tax Act, 1961

- Tax need to be deducted 1% (for individual, HUF)/ 2% (for others) of payment where payment is made for carrying out any work (including supply of labour for carrying out any work and advertisements) by a contractor/sub-contractor.
- Such work must be in pursuance of a contract (including sub-contract) between the contractor and payer.
- TDS is to be made at the time of credit to the account of the contractor or at the time of payment in cash or by cheque or draft or by any other mode whichever is earlier.
- No TDS shall be deducted if the single-time payment to the contractor does not exceed RS. 35000 or Rs. 1,00,000 in aggregate during the year.
- TDS Can be deducted when the date of actual payment of cash or the date of crediting the sum to the payee's account or the date of issue of cheque, draft, or by any other mode, whichever is earlier.
- Every affordable housing scheme gets extended for one more year till 31 March 2022.

=== TDS certificates ===
A Payer is required to issue a TDS certificate called form 16 for salaried employees and form 16A for non-salaried employees within a specified time. Form 16D is a TDS Certificate issued for payment of a commission, brokerage, contractual fee, the professional fee under section 194M by the payer. Under Section 194M if the payments to resident contractors and professionals exceed INR 50,00,000 during the Financial Year, the payer has to deduct tax at the rate of 5% from the sum payable to a resident payee.

payer has to issue TDS Certificates within two months of the next financial year.

There are two types of major forms under TDS namely:

Form 16: Form 16 is a certificate where the employer declares details about the salary an employee earned during the year and details of deducted TDS. Form 16 has two parts Part A and Part B. Part A consists of employer and employee details, which include name, address, PAN, TAN details, employment period, and details of TDS deducted & deposited with the government. Part B includes salary, income, deductions, and tax payable details, etc.

Form 16A: Form 16A is also a TDS Certificate but it is applicable for TDS on Income other than Salary. This certificate features details such as the name and address of the payer or payee, PAN/TAN details, challan details of TDS deposited, income, and TDS deducted and deposited on such income. Details from Form 16A will be fetched on Form 26AS.

Form 26AS can also be used to verify the TDS deduction. Form 26AS is a statement that provides details of any amount deducted as TDS or TCS from various sources of income of a taxpayer. You can view Form 26AS through the TRACES portal.

== See also ==
- Withholding tax
- Pay-as-you-earn tax
