= IDBI Bank =

Indian development finance institution

IDBI Bank Limited
- Formerly: Industrial Development Bank of India Limited (1964–2008)
- Type: Public
- Traded as: BSE: 500116; NSE: IDBI
- Industry: Financial services
- Predecessor: Industrial Development Bank of India
- Founded: 1 July 1964; 62 years ago
- Founder: Government of India (by the IDBI Act, 1964)
- Headquarters: IDBI Tower, WTC Complex, Cuffe Parade, Colaba, Mumbai, Maharashtra, India
- Key people: TN Manoharan (Part Time Chairman & Independent Director); Rakesh Sharma (MD & CEO)
- Products: Investment banking; Commercial banking; Retail banking; Asset Management; Pensions; Mortgages; Credit cards
- Revenue: ▲₹35,744 crore (US$3.8 billion) (2026)
- Operating income: ▼₹10,838 crore (US$1.2 billion) (2026)
- Net income: ▲₹9,210 crore (US$980 million) (2026)
- Total assets: ▲₹466,560 crore (US$50 billion) (2026)
- Total equity: ▲₹68,742 crore (US$7.3 billion) (2026)
- Owner: Government of India (45.48%); LIC (49.24%)
- Number of employees: 19,108 (2026)
- Subsidiaries: IDBI Capital Markets & Securities; IDBI Intech; IDBI Asset Management; IDBI MF Trustee Company; IDBI Trusteeship Services
- Capital ratio: 13.31%
- Website: idbi.bank.in

IDBI Bank Limited (formerly Industrial Development Bank of India Limited) is a Scheduled Commercial Bank under the ownership of Life Insurance Corporation of India (LIC) and Government of India. It was established in 1964 as IDBI, a development finance institution and a wholly owned subsidiary of Reserve Bank of India, and provided financial services to industrial sector.

In 2005, the institution was merged with its subsidiary commercial division, IDBI Bank, and was categorised as "Other Public Sector Bank" category. Later in March 2019, Government of India asked LIC to infuse capital in the bank due to high NPA and capital adequacy issues and also asked LIC to manage the bank to meet the regulatory norms. Consequent upon LIC acquiring 51% of the total paid-up equity share capital, the bank was categorised as a 'private sector bank' for regulatory purposes by Reserve Bank of India with effect from 21 January 2019. IDBI was put under Prompt Corrective Action of the Reserve Bank of India and, on 10 March 2021, IDBI came out of the same. At present, direct and indirect shareholding of Government of India in IDBI Bank is approximately 95%, which Government of India (GoI) through its communication dated 17 December 2019, directed all central/state government departments to consider IDBI Bank for allocation of government business. Many national institutes find their roots in IDBI like SIDBI, EXIM, National Stock Exchange of India, SEBI, National Securities Depository Limited. Presently, IDBI Bank is one of the largest Commercial Banks in India.

As of July 2025, the bank has more than 2,100 banking branches, more than 3,700 ATMs, 24 banking outlets, including one overseas branch in Dubai. It operates 58 e-lounges as of 1 August 2023. As of September 2021, LIC holds the majority stake in this bank having 49.24% shareholding and the Government of India holds 45.48%, with LIC being in control of the management of the bank.

== History ==
=== Overview of development banking in India ===
Development banking emerged after the Second World War and the Great Depression in the 1930s. The demand for reconstruction funds for the affected nations compelled in setting up of national institutions for reconstruction. At the time of Independence in 1947, India had a fairly developed banking system. The adoption of bank dominated financial development strategy was aimed at meeting the sectoral credit needs, particularly of agriculture and industry. Towards this end, the Reserve Bank concentrated on regulating and developing mechanisms for institution building. The commercial banking network was expanded to cater to the requirements of general banking and for meeting the short-term working capital requirements of industry and agriculture. Specialized Development Financial Institutions (DFIs) such as the IDBI, NABARD, NHB and SIDBI were set up to meet the long-term financing requirements of industry and agriculture.

=== Formation of Industrial Development Bank of India (IDBI) ===
The Industrial Development Bank of India (IDBI) was established in 1964 under an Act of Parliament as a wholly owned subsidiary of the Reserve Bank of India. In 1976, the ownership of IDBI was transferred to the Union government and it was made the principal financial institution for coordinating the activities of institutions engaged in financing, promoting and developing industry in India. IDBI provided financial assistance, both in rupee and foreign currencies, for green-field projects and also for expansion, modernization, and diversification purposes. In the wake of financial sector reforms unveiled by the government since 1992, IDBI also provided indirect financial assistance by way of refinancing of loans extended by State-level financial institutions and banks and by way of rediscounting of bills of exchange arising out of the sale of indigenous machinery on deferred payment terms.

After the public issue of IDBI in July 1995, the government shareholding in the bank came down from 100% to 75%.

IDBI played a pioneering role, particularly in the pre-reform era (1964–91), in catalyzing broad-based industrial development in India in keeping with its government-ordained 'development banking' charter.
Some of the institutions built with the support of IDBI are the Securities and Exchange Board of India, National Stock Exchange of India, the National Securities Depository Limited, the Stock Holding Corporation of India Limited, the Credit Analysis & Research Ltd, the Exim Bank (India), the Small Industries Development Bank of India and the Entrepreneurship Development Institute of India.

=== Conversion of IDBI into a commercial bank ===
A committee formed by RBI recommended the development financial institution (IDBI) to diversify its activity and harmonize the role of development financing and banking activities by getting away from the conventional distinction between commercial banking and developmental banking. To keep up with reforms in financial sector, IDBI reshaped its role from a development finance institution to a commercial institution. With the Industrial Development Bank (Transfer of Undertaking and Repeal) Act, 2003, IDBI attained the status of a limited company viz., IDBI Ltd.

Subsequently, in September 2004, the Reserve Bank of India incorporated IDBI as a 'scheduled bank' under the RBI Act, 1934. The commercial banking arm, IDBI Bank, was merged into IDBI in 2005.

=== IDBI crisis in 2014 ===
For the financial year 2015–16 , IDBI Bank reported a net loss of ₹3,665 crore. Gross NPA of IDBI rose from 5.88 per cent in 2014-15 to 27.95 per cent in 2017-18. IDBI Bank's Gross NPA soared to Rs. 44,753 crores by 2017 and net profit plummeted to Rs. -3,665 crores in 2016-17. Majority of NPA was from loans given between 2012-13 to 2016-17 era.

=== Direct government intervention ===
The merger was expected to streamline operations of the bank. However, IDBI continued to base its policy towards industrial sector like the erstwhile IDBI entity did. This resulted in the retail business of the bank to be limited to 13 percent of its total business. As of March 2018, the total Non Performing Assets (NPA) rose to ₹55,588 crore (equivalent to ₹810 billion or US$8.7 billion in 2026) and were about 28 percent of its total loans. This was the highest among Indian banks. The Union government intervened, with Life Insurance Corporation bailing out the bank with an infusion of ₹9,300 crores.

On 29 June 2018, LIC got a technical go-ahead from the Insurance Regulatory and Development Authority of India (IRDAI) to increase stake in IDBI Bank up to 51%. LIC completed the acquisition of 51% controlling stake on 21 January 2019, with a total investment of ₹21,624 crores.

== Privatisation ==
In July 2026, the Government of India and the Life Insurance Corporation (LIC) selected Canadian investment firm Fairfax Financial as the winning bidder to acquire a combined 60.72% controlling stake in IDBI Bank for approximately ₹53,000 crore (US$5.5 billion), at a revised offer price of ₹81 per share. On 14 October 2026, the Cabinet Committee on Economic Affairs approved the sale at a final price of ₹52,878 crore, with the Government of India divesting 30.48% and LIC divesting 30.24% to Fairfax at ₹81 per share. The CCEA separately authorised an Alternative Mechanism headed by Finance Minister Nirmala Sitharaman to sell the government and LIC's residual 15% holding in the open market at a later date. Completion of the Fairfax transfer remains subject to the Reserve Bank of India's final regulatory clearance.

Because Reserve Bank of India (RBI) regulations prohibit an entity from simultaneously owning and operating two separate commercial domestic lenders, the transaction is subject to a restructuring clause regarding Fairfax's existing 40% ownership of CSB Bank. Regulators reportedly structured a post-closing grace period of up to two years for Fairfax to either divest its holding in CSB Bank or merge it directly into IDBI Bank to achieve statutory compliance. The execution of the privatisation remains subject to final statutory "fit and proper" certifications from the RBI and the Securities and Exchange Board of India (SEBI).

== Operations ==
=== Acquisition of United Western Bank ===
In 2006, IDBI Bank acquired United Western Bank (headquartered at Satara) in a rescue. By acquiring UWB, IDBI Bank doubled the number of its branches from 195 to 425.

=== Strategic disinvestment to LIC ===
LIC of India completed the acquisition of 51% controlling stake in the bank in January 2019, making it the majority shareholder. Subsequent to the enhancement of equity stake by LIC of India, Reserve Bank of India has clarified via press release on 14 March 2019, that IDBI Bank stands re-categorised as a private sector bank, with retrospective effect from 21 January 2019. LIC took over the management control of the bank while the Union government, categorised as a promoter.

== Listings and shareholding ==
IDBI Bank's equity shares are listed on Bombay Stock Exchange and the National Stock Exchange of India. As of 30 September 2025, the Union government held 45.48% shares in IDBI Bank, while LIC held 49.24% and the remaining is held by non-promoters.

== Employees ==
As of 1 September 2023, the bank had 18,283 employees, out of which 197 were employees with disabilities. The average age of bank employees on the same date was 34 years. The bank reported a business of ₹25.64 crores per employee and a net profit of ₹12.17 lakhs per employee during the FY 2012–13.

IDBI Intech Ltd.
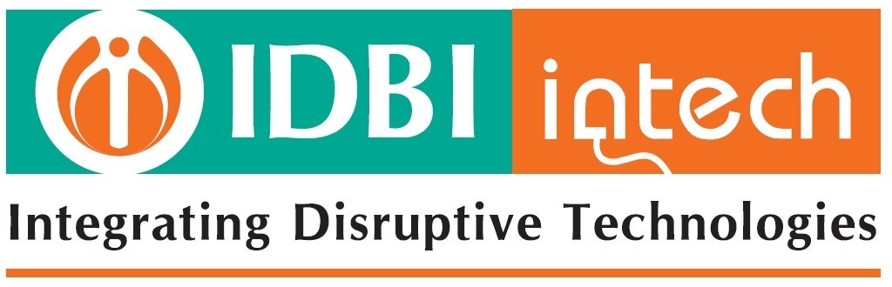
- IDBI Intech Ltd
- Type: Subsidiary
- Industry: IT Solutions & Services in Banking and Finance services
- Founded: March 2000
- Headquarters: Navi Mumbai, India
- Services: IT Consulting; IT Services; Outsourcing; Software Products
- Number of employees: 1750 (As on 31 October 2021)
- Parent: IDBI Bank
- Website: IDBI Intech Ltd

IDBI Intech Ltd. (IIL) is a wholly owned subsidiary of IDBI Bank, established in 2000.

It provides IT related services in the areas of Consultancy, System Integration, System implementation & support, Applications & Server hosting and other IT related managed services and specialized training.

IDBI Intech has been accredited with ISO 9001:2000 certification for IT-related services including Data Centre Management and Call Centre, and also Certified IT Security Auditing Organisation with the Indian Computer Emergency Response Team (CERT-In).

== Awards and recognitions ==
- IDBI Bank ranked #1197 in the Forbes Global 2000 in May 2013.
- It received the 'Overall Best Bank' and 'Best Public Sector Bank' awards in the Dun & Bradstreet Banking Awards, 2011.
- In 2011, it received Banking Technology awards for best use of Business Intelligence and the best Risk Management from Indian Banks Association.

== COVID-19 Moratorium ==
IDBI Bank was one of the banks to apply an automatic moratorium or automatic relief on loan accounts during the COVID-19 pandemic without prior consent from customers. Customers would then have had to send an email to opt out of the moratorium.

== See also ==
- IDFC
- Banking in India
- Indian Financial System Code
- List of companies of India
- List of national development banks
