= Demat account =

Account to hold financial securities in electronic form

A demat account is an Indian term for a dematerialized account that holds financial securities (equity or debt) digitally for traded shares in the stock market. In India, demat accounts are maintained by two depository organizations: the National Securities Depository Limited and the Central Depository Services Limited.

A depository participant (DP), such as a bank, acts as an intermediary between the investor and the depository. In India, a DP is described as an agent of the depository. The relationship between the DPs and the depository is governed by an agreement made between the two under the Depositories Act.

A security is a tradable financial asset; the term commonly refers to any form of a financial instrument, but its legal definition varies by jurisdiction. Purchases and sales of securities on the demat account are automatically made once transactions are confirmed and completed.

== Types of demat accounts ==
There are three types of demat accounts offered by depository participants:

- Regular demat accounts
- Repatriable demat accounts (allows foreign funds and transfers abroad)
- Non-repatriable demat accounts

== Fees ==
There are four major charges usually levied on a demat account: account opening fee, annual maintenance fee, custodian fee and transaction fee. Charges for all fees vary by depository participant.

- Account-opening fee - There may not be an opening account fee. Private banks do not have one, but other entities do impose an opening fee.
- Maintenance fee - This is also known as folio maintenance charges, and is generally levied in advance. It is charged on an annual or monthly basis.
- Custodian fee - A fee for holding the securities.
- Transaction fee - A fee per transaction.

== Documents required ==
Opening a demat account requires providing documents that fulfill the requirements of Know Your Customer rules.
