= Finance Act (India) =

Indian government legislation

A Finance Act is the fiscal legislation enacted by the Indian Parliament to give effect to the financial proposals of the central government. It is enacted once a year and contains provisions relating to income taxes, customs, excise, Central and Integrated GST and other cess, exemptions, and reliefs. It may also contain provisions to amend other acts as the government to effect its fiscal policy. The bill is usually termed the budget and it is introduced in Parliament by the Finance Minister.

== Important elements of a Finance Act ==
The most important element of the Finance Act the setting of income tax brackets and rates. Each act includes various details related to:

- Income through salary and wages
- Agricultural income
- Tax brackets
- Tax rates and surcharges
- Company taxes
- Advance tax

These elements are derailed in each year's Finance Act.

Each year's act also includes any amendments that have been made with respect to direct taxes.

== The schedule ==
The schedule in any Finance Act is a systematic depiction of all the rules and regulations laid down by the act for that financial year.

The schedule gives details on

- Rates of income tax
- Surcharge on income tax
- Rates for deduction of tax at source
- Details of advance tax
- Details for computation of net agricultural income

among other details.

== Acts ==
The Taxation Laws (Second Amendment) Act, 2016 inserted the new Chapter IX A, as "Pradhan Mantri Garib Kalyan Yojana, 2016" in The Finance Act, 2016.

== Recent developments ==
The Income-tax Act, 2025 received presidential assent and came into force on 1 April 2026, repealing the Income-tax Act, 1961. The new act reorganises India's direct tax law into 536 sections across 23 chapters and replaces the dual "previous year" and "assessment year" concepts with a single "tax year." Its scope was expanded by the Finance Bill, 2025, which broadened the definition of undisclosed income in search cases to include virtual digital assets such as cryptographically generated tokens.
