= Tax return =

Tax liability document

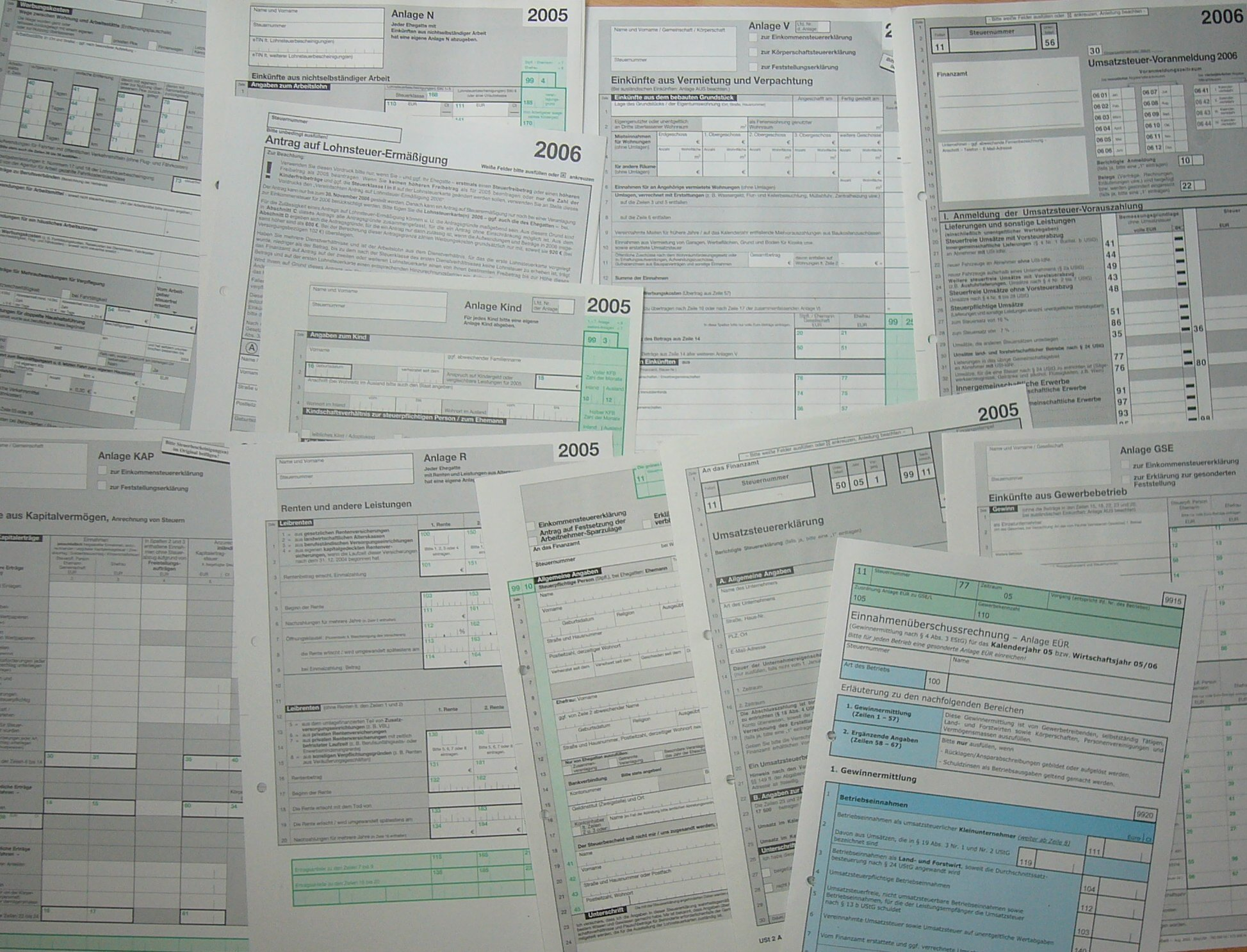
German tax forms

A tax return is a form on which a person or organization presents an account of income and circumstances, used by the tax authorities to determine liability for tax.

Tax returns are usually processed by each country's tax authority, known as a revenue service, such as the Internal Revenue Service in the United States, the State Taxation Administration in China, and HM Revenue and Customs in the United Kingdom.

== Preparing the tax return ==
A tax return reports income, expenses, tax payments made during the year and other relevant information to the taxing authority. It helps to determine whether a tax refund is due. This will depend on whether a person has overpaid on taxes, or was late in paying tax for previous years.

A person or organization may not be required to file a tax return depending on circumstances, which are different in each country. Generally, a tax return does not need to be filed if income is less than a certain amount, but other factors such as the type of income, age, and filing status also play a role. Occasionally, there may be situations where the tax return need not be filed, but is filed anyway to receive a tax refund.

The tax return is not necessarily the final calculation; it may be accepted or not accepted as correct by the government authority.

The time and effort involved in filing a tax return varies from country to country, but governments try to help citizens in different ways. Many governments utilize electronic filling and payment systems that keep a record of a person's history of tax returns and refunds. Another notable change in recent years is that government bodies share the data with each other. Within several European nations such as Denmark and Sweden, governments already provide citizens with prefilled return forms, which a citizen would sign if accurate, and if not, can fix the error on their own or prepare returns themselves. In Denmark and Sweden, 97 percent and 74 percent of taxpayers had their forms prefilled by tax authorities respectively in 1999.

The length of the completion of a tax return depends on the country, but the world average is almost 232 hours.

=== AI in tax return preparation ===
The use of generative artificial intelligence (AI) has been explored as a tool for assisting with the preparation of tax returns. AI-based systems can support tasks such as organizing financial data, identifying deductions, and completing tax forms.

A study conducted in Germany in January 2026 by BuchhaltungsButler, involving 1,009 participants, reported that 47% of respondents were open to using AI-based tools such as ChatGPT instead of a human tax advisor for tax return preparation. Acceptance of AI-assisted tax filing was higher among younger respondents and individuals with higher incomes.

== Components of a tax return ==
A tax return usually includes the following components.

Income consists of the sources of a citizen's revenue, excluding items which are exempt from tax by law. Wages, salaries, income from retirement plans, dividends, interest and capital gains or losses should be considered as a source of revenue.

Taxable income includes wages, salaries, rental income, dividends, and business profits, after deducting any allowable deductions. In Australia, the concept of taxable income is central to determining the amount of income tax a person is liable to pay.

Deductions are items that are subtracted from taxable income, thereby reducing the tax liability. For organizations, most expenses specifically identified with business tasks are deductible. Examples of tax deductions include mortgage interests, student loan interest, contributions to saving plans for retirement etc. In general, taxes paid will be less when the taxpayer chooses the larger of itemized deductions or the standard deduction. The standard deduction varies according to filing status. In the United States, the standard deduction is higher for older taxpayers (65 and above). If the taxpayer chooses to itemize, such deductions are recorded on Schedule A. Itemized deductions should be supported by documentation which the taxpayer retains after filing the tax return.

Tax credits reduce the amount of paid to government entities. Tax credits are more impactful than deductions because they directly reduce the amount of tax owed. If a person has $500 in tax credits, and the tax owed is $500, the tax credits will reduce a person's liability to zero. Tax credits arise from multiple areas. For example, a person may receive a Child Tax Credit if they care for a child under the age of 13. Education expenses might be treated as a tax credit in some countries, such as the American Opportunity Tax Credit in the United States.

Payments and refunds include estimated tax payments and amounts withheld from a person's paycheck. If they have overpaid their taxes, they will receive a refund.

== Tax schedule ==
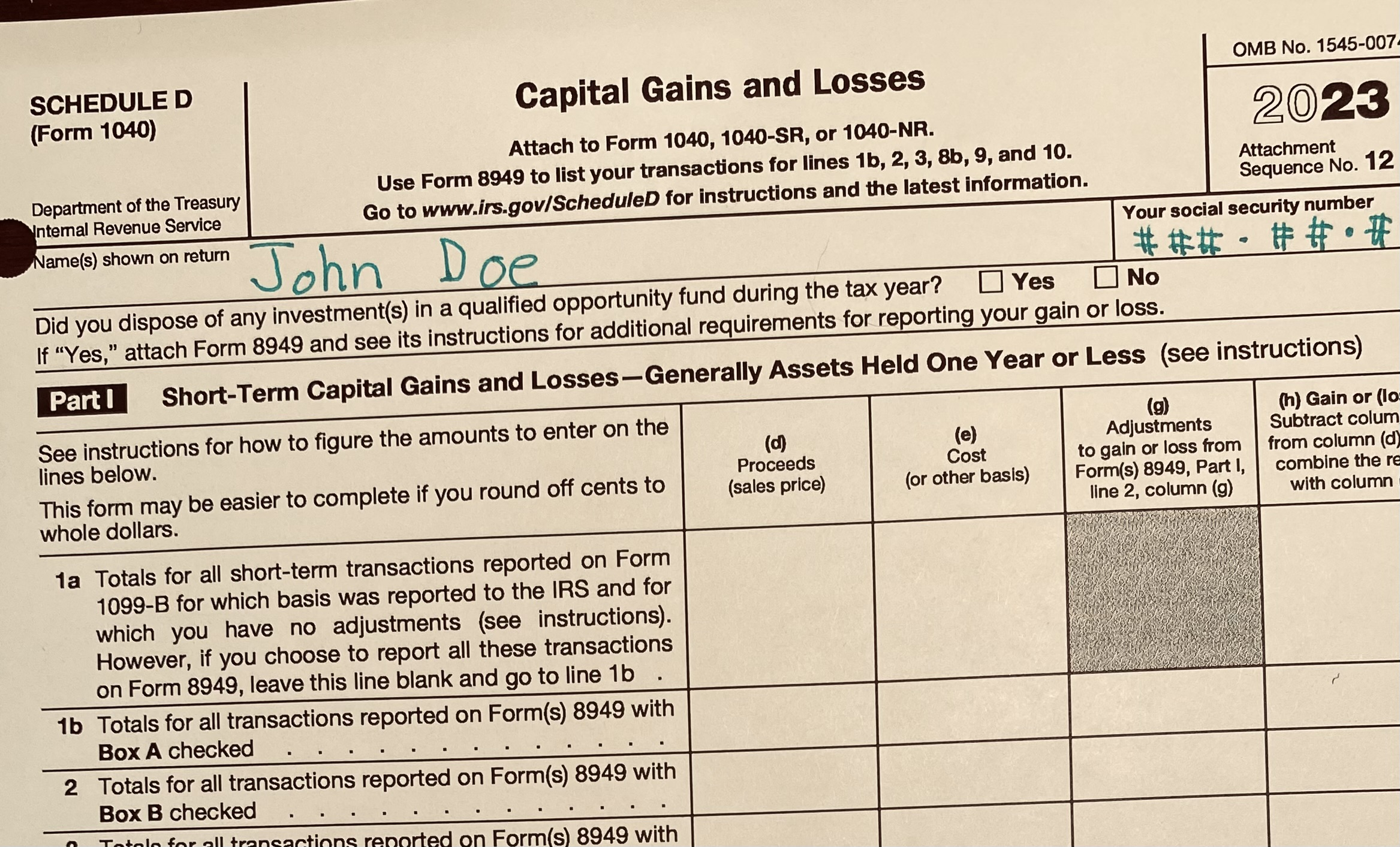
Tax schedule used to report capital gains in the USA

In the United States, a tax schedule is a form that the Internal Revenue Service (IRS) requires taxpayers to fill out in addition to the tax return. It is a tool that reports and provides information about the additional calculations and other amounts stated in the tax return.

Tax schedules are used by both taxpayers and taxation authorities such as the IRS. Simple tax returns can be filed using the Form 1040 whereas complex tax returns additionally require a tax schedule to be completed with the tax return. There are different types of schedules such as Schedule A, Schedule B, Schedule C, Schedule D, Schedule EIC, and Schedule SE. Specific tax forms can be used by taxpayers or private entities that are required to report information on their tax liabilities, including income earners, businesses, and companies.

== See also ==
- Tax revenue
- Tax information reporting
- Tax returns in Australia
- Tax returns in Canada
- Tax returns in India
- Tax returns in Germany
- Tax returns in the United Kingdom
- Tax returns in the United States
- Taxation in Greece
- Taxation in Iran
- Taxation in Peru
- Taxation in Spain
- Taxation in the United Kingdom
- Income tax in China
- Income tax in Scotland
- Income tax in Singapore
- Income tax in the Netherlands
- Papal income tax
- Tax evasion
