= Income-tax Act, 2025 =

Legislation in India

Income Tax Act, 2025

Parliament of India
- Long title: An Act to consolidate and amend the law relating to income-tax.
- Citation: Act. No. 30 of 2025
- Territorial extent: India
- Passed by: House of the People
- Passed: 11 August 2025
- Passed by: Council of States
- Passed: 12 August 2025
- Assented to by: President Droupadi Murmu
- Assented to: 21 August 2025
- Commenced: 1 April 2026

Legislative history

Initiating chamber: House of the People
- Bill title: Income-tax (No. 2) Bill, 2025
- Bill citation: Bill No. 104 of 2025
- Introduced by: Nirmala Sitharaman Minister of Finance, Minister of Corporate Affairs
- Introduced: 11 August 2025
- Passed: 11 August 2025

Revising chamber: Council of States
- Passed: 12 August 2025

Repeals
- Income-tax Act, 1961
- Status: In force

The Income Tax Act, 2025 is the charging statute of income tax in India. It contains 536 sections across 23 chapters and 16 schedules, aiming to modernise the country’s direct tax system, simplify compliance, and reduce litigation.

The revised bill was tabled on 11 August 2025 following the withdrawal of an earlier version introduced in February 2025, and became law upon receiving Presidential assent on 21 August 2025.

== Background and Timeline ==
The Ministry of Finance announced a comprehensive overhaul of the Income-tax Act, 1961, citing the need for simplification after over six decades of amendments.

The original Income-tax Bill, 2025 was introduced in the Lok Sabha on 13 February 2025 and referred to a Select Committee chaired by MP Baijayant Panda. The committee submitted over 285 recommendations, of which 32 were considered significant. Based on this feedback, the government withdrew the bill on 8 August 2025 and introduced a revised version three days later.

On 7 February 2026, the IT Department released the final draft rules and forms that will come into place and sought for public opinion for changes and comments if any prior to effecting the legislation.

=== Timeline ===
- 13 February 2025, Income-tax Bill, 2025 was introduced in Lok Sabha, the lower house of the Parliament of India and was sent to select committee.
- 21 July 2025: The select committee has submitted its report to the parliament.
- 8 August 2025: The Income-tax Bill, 2025 was withdrawn in Lok Sabha.
- 11 August 2025: The Income-tax (No. 2) Bill, 2025, was introduced and passed by Lok Sabha.
- 12 August 2025: The Income-tax (No. 2) Bill, 2025, was introduced and passed by Rajya Sabha.
- 21 August 2025: The Income-tax (No. 2) Bill, 2025 receives Presidential assent making it an Act.
- 1 April 2026, The Income Tax Act, 2025, came into force.

== Key provisions ==
Major features of the Act include:

- Streamlining the tax process by replacing the complicated distinction between the “Assessment Year” and “Previous Year” with a single, unified “Tax Year” concept.
- Retention of a ₹12 lakh annual basic exemption limit with revised tax slabs to benefit middle-income groups.
- Reduction of total sections from over 800 in the 1961 Act to 536.
- Digital-first, faceless assessment procedures to reduce human interface and curb corruption.
- Clarification on standard deduction for house property and pre-construction interest for home loan borrowers.
- Full deduction of commuted lump-sum pension from specified pension schemes.
- Provision for faster refunds post income-tax return deadlines, and requirement for prior notice before enforcement.
- Restrictions on anonymous donations to certain religious trusts.
- The Act expands the definition of "undisclosed income", which included money, bullion, jewellery, or other valuable articles, to include virtual digital assets.

== Structure overview ==
The Act is divided into 23 chapters covering topics from preliminary definitions to miscellaneous provisions, and includes 16 schedules on exemptions, deductions, and procedural rules.

== See also ==
- Income-tax Act, 1961
- Budget of India
- Taxation in India
