= Central Depository Services Limited =

Indian security depository

Central Depository Services (India) Limited
- Type: Public
- Traded as: NSE: CDSL
- ISIN: INE736A01011
- Industry: Depository services
- Founded: February 1999
- Headquarters: Mumbai, India
- Key people: Nehal Vora (MD & CEO)
- Services: Dematerialisation of securities; Transfer, clearing and settlement of securities transactions
- Revenue: ▲₹812 crore (US$84 million) (2024)
- Operating income: ▲₹488 crore (US$51 million) (2024)
- Net income: ▲₹420 crore (US$44 million) (2024)
- Total assets: ▲₹1,781 crore (US$180 million) (2024)
- Total equity: ▲₹1,463 crore (US$150 million) (2024)
- Website: www.cdslindia.com
- Footnotes; Financials as of 31 March 2024.

Central Depository Services (India) Ltd. (CDSL) is an Indian central securities depository, established in 1999. Headquartered in the Lower Parel, Mumbai. It is the primary market infrastructure institution providing depository services in India.

CDSL is the largest depository in India in terms of the number of demat accounts opened. In February 2022, CDSL became the first depository in India to open 60 million active demat accounts. As of March 2022, the depository holds assets worth ₹37.2 trillion, with over 580 depository participants associated with CDSL.

== History ==
In February 1999, CDSL received certificate of commencement of business from Securities and Exchange Board of India (SEBI). On 30 June 2017, CDSL was listed on the National Stock Exchange (NSE) through initial public offering (IPO) making it the first depository in Asia-Pacific region and only the second depository in the world to get listed.

CDSL was initially promoted by BSE Limited. Currently, the top shareholders are BSE Limited, Standard Chartered Bank, PPFAS Mutual Fund, HDFC Bank and LIC.

Central Depository Service (INDIA) Limited (CDSL) was listed on the National Stock Exchange (NSE) on June 30, 2017.

== Operations ==
As of 2026, CDSL serviced over 18.82 crore active investor demat accounts across 585 registered depository participants. The depository held 10,82,254 million securities in demant custody, with a total asset custody value of ₹9,01,09,054 million.

As of 2026, the company maintain a direct workforce of over 600 employees.

In August 2026, the CDSL Investor Protection Fund (IPF), in collaboration with Amar Chitra Katha, launched The Garden of Prosperity, an animated investor education film released in 12 Indian Languages. Featuring characters based on Akbar and Birbal, the initiative focuses on goal-based investing, asset diversification, and emergency fund planning.

== Board of Directors ==
As of 2026,

- Shri Gurumoorthy Mahalingam - Chairperson Public Interest Director
- Shri Nehal Vora - Managing Director & Chief Executive Officer
- Smt. Rajeshree Sabnavis - Public Interest Director
- Prof. Varsha Apte - Public Interest Director
- Shri Bharat Vasani - Public Interest Director
- Shri Ganesh Kumar - Public Interest Director
- Shri Rajesh Tuteja - Public Interest Director
- Shri Rajesh Kumar - Non- Independent Director
- Shri Amit Mahajan - Executive Director for Verticle 1
- Smt. Nayana Ovalekar - Executive Director for Verticle 2

== See also ==
- National Securities Depository Limited (NSDL)
- National Stock Exchange
- Clearstream
- Euroclear
