= StockHolding Corporation of India =

Depository participant in India

Stock Holding Corporation of India Limited
- Type: Public sector undertaking
- Industry: Financial services & e-Services
- Founded: 1986, Mumbai
- Headquarters: Mumbai, Maharashtra, India
- Area served: India
- Key people: Shri Atul Saxena (Managing Director & CEO) Shri Manoj Parida (COO) (Chief Operating Officer) Shri Vinay E. Purohit (Chief Financial Officer)
- Services: Custodial services Depository services Stockbroking e-Stamping; Document management Distribution of investment and insurance products
- Parent: IFCI Limited
- Website: www.stockholding.com

Stock Holding Corporation of India Limited (StockHolding) is an Indian financial services company based in Mumbai. It was incorporated in 1986 as a public limited company and provides custodial and depository services. It is also the Central Record Keeping Agency for e-stamping, the electronic collection of non-judicial stamp duty, in several Indian states and union territories. StockHolding has been a subsidiary of IFCI Limited since 2015.

Its other shareholders include the Life Insurance Corporation of India, the General Insurance Corporation of India, the Specified Undertaking of the Unit Trust of India (SUUTI), New India Assurance, National Insurance Company, United India Insurance and Oriental Insurance.

In November 2024, the Department of Financial Services of the Ministry of Finance gave in-principle approval for the consolidation of the IFCI group, which includes the proposed merger of StockHolding into IFCI Limited. In July 2025, the IFCI board recommended the consolidation plan to the government. The merger is subject to regulatory and statutory approvals.

== Corporate structure ==
StockHolding has three wholly owned subsidiaries: StockHolding Services Limited (SSL), StockHolding Document Management Services Limited (SDMS) and StockHolding Securities IFSC Limited (SSIL).

1. StockHolding Services Limited is a stockbroker serving retail and institutional clients in the equity cash and futures and options segments.
2. StockHolding Document Management Services Limited provides physical and digital document management and digitisation services.
3. StockHolding Securities IFSC Limited is based in the International Financial Services Centre at GIFT City, Gujarat, and provides securities market services there.

== Operations ==
=== Domestic presence ===
As of 2026, StockHolding had more than 200 branches in India.

== Products and services ==
Retail services: StockHolding offers Demat accounts and distributes investment products, including mutual funds, the National Pension System (NPS), initial public offerings, fixed deposits, non-convertible debentures, Floating Rate Savings Bonds 2020 (Taxable) and capital gains tax exemption bonds, as well as insurance.

Corporate services: These include demat services, government securities services through constituent subsidiary general ledger (CSGL) accounts, trading services and NPS-related services.

e-Services: e-Stamping, e-Court fees , e-Registration fees and StockHolding DigiDoc.

1. e-Stamping :- StockHolding is the Central Record Keeping Agency (CRA) for the Computerised Stamp Duty Administration System (C-SDAS), the electronic system for collecting non-judicial stamp duty, under an authorisation from the Department of Economic Affairs of the Ministry of Finance. As of October 2026, its e-stamping service was in use in 26 states and union territories. The company also collects court fees electronically in 16 states and union territories and registration fees in eight states.
2. StockHolding DigiDoc:- StockHolding DigiDoc is a web-based platform for preparing and executing legal and contractual documents that do not require registration.

Custodial services: Services for institutional investors include custody, asset servicing, collateral management, fund accounting, valuation, securities lending and borrowing, professional clearing member services for derivatives, and CSGL services.
