= Challan =

Receipt for payment, used in India and Pakistan

Challan or Chalan is a common Hindi word (चालान, cālān) that has become an Indian English technical word used officially in many professional, especially financial transactions. It usually means an official form or receipt of acknowledgement or other kind of proof document, piece of paperwork, police citation, etc. According to American Merriam-Webster Dictionary "Chalan" means voucher or invoice. Similarly, British-English Dictionary Lexico also defines Challan as noun, "an official form or document, such as a receipt, invoice, or summons", and verb, "issue (someone) with an official notice of a traffic offence" and gives several examples of their applications, which are also paralleled by the Oxford Learner's Dictionary's two separate entries on the same. Wiktionary also gives examples of the application of the word challan in southeast Asia, including its use as a verb with challaning and challaned used similarly in context and meaning to police ticketing or someone being ticketed. While most of the dictionaries talk about the meaning representing a monetary penalty which is true in most real cases, Collins English Dictionary goes one step further and defines the verb part of the meaning of Chalan as "verb (transitive), to cause (an accused person) to appear before a magistrate", which in reality happens only in a subset of cases of Challan when a person misses paying the Challan and the matter moves to the next step of receiving a summon from a court.

== Etymology ==
The Indian English word challan comes from the Hindi word Challan (चालान) which in turn comes from Sanskrit root verb Chal (चल), which means movement. So challans have something to do with mobility or passage or transfer. Thus, Challan possibly literally refers to the monetary transfer i.e. a transaction coupled with the other official act described in the paper or electronic pre-filled or printed form given as Challan. In contrast to the Police stations that have a large "Diary" where FIR etc. are lodged, Traffic police officers, on the street or in their mobile vans, carry portable printed Challan booklets. These booklets have provision of paper Half Cutting or Perforating or Creasing, along which they would tear off half of an individual leaflet. After making duplicate entries on either side, the Traffic Police Officer would detach the distal half piece off the challan booklet and issue to the offender as the "challan", in their official capacity.

== Derivatives, portmanteau words, and phrases ==
It is common to have portmanteau words of challan with English prefixes: e.g. "e-Challan" would mean an electronic challan processed or paid online. E-Challan is similar to English-Hindi portmanteaus like e-Seva-Kendra, a service-centre (Seva-Kendra) that has electronic or online transaction facilities. Also, challan is part of Hindi-English phrases that are abbreviated (e.g., C.I.N. or "Challan Identification Number" in technical applications).

== Application of "challan" in different contexts ==
As opposed to the banking Challan which is an acknowledgement receipt for a credit, in case of a Traffic Challan, the receipt or ticket usually represents acknowledgment of an accusation for a penalty which is usually fine of a sum of money.

=== Challan as a monetary credit receipt ===
==== Banking challan ====
In case of banking "Challan" is a way of crediting the money to one's bank account through a form, generally used in India and Pakistan as a receipt for payment or delivery, and "C.I.N." would stand for "Challan Identification Number".

As per the definition on the UBS Management firm website:

A challan or bank challan is defined as an official document, form, or piece of paper used to credit money from one account to another. It is almost similar to the deposit slip available in the bank with which you can deposit money into someone's account in cash. However, in the deposit slip you need to enter the recipient's data and details while in the bank challan, they are already pre-filled.

==== Tax challans ====
Several tax forms in India are known as tax challan forms e.g. CHALLAN NO./ITNS 280, CHALLAN NO./ITNS 281, CHALLAN NO./ITNS 282, CHALLAN NO./ITNS 283. The abbreviation CIN is also used in this context of tax forms as well.

==== Delivery challan ====
When an item is delivered, the proof of delivery receipt is a delivery challan. Sometimes items are paid after delivery and physical verification of the delivered item and the "delivery challan" with receiving signature is held for future payment against it. Thus delivering items in advance "on a loan basis" before processing payment or procurement has come to be described as delivering "on a challan basis". In this case the term "loan basis" or "credit basis" is relative because both parties might keep a copy of the challan. But if there is only one original copy, then the receiver signs and puts receive details (usually of intact package), time and date etc. on the challan and hands it as a receipt of delivery credit to the party who sent the consignment.

==== General payment receipt challan ====
Any payment receipt from a big institution, especially a government institution, issued to an individual may be termed a challan. e.g. Oxford Learners Dictionary gives an example "You need to show a copy of the fee payment challan before you can take the exam.

=== Challan as a punitive citation for an offence or infringement ===
==== Traffic challan ====
Another example of use of "challan" is as a traffic ticket issued by the traffic police for a violation of traffic rules by a driver. When a traffic challan is issued against a person's name he or she is responsible to pay the penalty depending on the type of violation made as per the Indian Motor Vehicles Act, 1988. Traffic challans can be paid by various mechanisms e.g. by cash, at an e-seva center, or by any other payment mode as specified on the challan.

==== Challans under section 188 of the Indian Penal Code ====
Usually traffic police carry a receipt book named a challan book. But other than traffic violations other offenses may be also challaned with a magistrates order under Section 188 of Indian Penal Code (IPC). For example, instances of not wearing a mask during the COVID-19 pandemic have been challaned under section 188 the IPC.

== E-challan ==
An e-challan is an electronic format of challan. An e-challan can also be defined as a specific format used for depositing or remitting the contribution or statutory payment at a bank or treasury.

=== Traffic e-challan ===
Many Indian state governments have established a new challan system called e-challans. The e-challan system of India has been in vogue for almost a decade, starting to roll out in pilot phases from 2012 onward. The e-challan may be operated by PDAs, cell phones or e-Seva Kendras whose e-services include facility for payment of e-challans for traffic violation. They have also established web portals where one can check if their vehicle has any traffic offences registered against it. This website will detail the offence description, fine amount, user charges, and the total fine amount. In Coimbatore city the system started in October 2013 and service uses hand-held machines for Spot Fining System, which runs on a low cost platform named VIOLET (Violation Prevention and Regulation Enforcement), which runs on android-based tablets or cellular phones and is also integrated to a Bluetooth printer to dispatch receipts.

Other initial cities where it started becoming operational included Ahmedabad, Chennai, Hyderabad, Bangalore, Uttar Pradesh, Delhi, Vijayawada etc., followed by Mumbai and Pune by mid 2015.

As of 2022 an e-Challan in India may be followed up in a virtual court as well.

=== Banking e-challan ===
Just like the traffic challan, the banking challan also has a corresponding e-challan in many banks.

== See also ==
- Economy of India
- Economy of Pakistan
