= National Securities Depository Limited =

Central securities depository in India

- Type: Public/JV of PSUs
- Traded as: BSE: 544467
- ISIN: INE301O01023
- Industry: Central securities depository
- Founded: 1996; 30 years ago
- Headquarters: Mumbai, Maharashtra, India
- Key people: Vijay Chandok (MD & CEO)
- Products: Demat account, Transfer and Settlement of Securities
- Services: Depository services
- Owners: IDBI Bank (26.1%); NSE (24%); HDFC Bank (8.9%); SUUTI (6.83%)
- Website: nsdl.co.in

National Securities Depository Limited (NSDL) is an Indian central securities depository, based in Mumbai. It was established in August 1996 as the first electronic securities depository in India with national coverage. As of 2025, its demat accounts held assets worth ₹464 lakh crore ($4.64 trillion).

NSDL provides services to investors, stock brokers, custodians and issuer companies through a network of Depository Participants and digital platforms. Its services are related to dematerialization, transfer and settlement of securities in the Indian securities market.

== History ==
National Securities Depository Limited (NSDL) is an Indian central securities depository under the jurisdiction of Ministry of Finance, Government of India based in Mumbai. The enactment of Depositories Act, December 1995 paved the way for establishment of NSDL as Joint-Venture of PSUs and PSBs. It was established in 1996 as the first electronic securities depository in India with national coverage.

NSDL has more than 2.80 crore demat accounts as of 30 June 2022. It contributes to majority of the settlement in the Indian securities markets and has more than 89% share in the total value of assets held in demat form in India.

The initial public offering (IPO) of NSDL was launched in July 2025 as an offer for sale (OFS) of shares worth ₹4,012 crore (US$458 million) by its existing shareholders, including NSE, IDBI Bank, State Bank of India, HDFC Bank, and SUUTI. The shares listed on BSE on 6 August 2025. The SUUTI (Specified Undertaking of the Unit Trust of India) sold 34.15 lakh shares in the IPO, representing a government share sale since SUUTI holds shares on behalf of the Government of India.

== Company structure ==
NSDL Group comprises National Securities Depository Limited (abbreviated as NSDL), NSDL Database Management Limited (NDML) and NSDL Payments Bank Limited. NDML and NSDL Payments Bank are two subsidiary companies of NSDL.

NSDL Payments Bank Limited
- Type: Subsidiary
- Industry: Financial services
- Headquarters: Mumbai, India
- Area served: India
- Key people: Abhijit Kamalapurkar (MD & CEO)
- Products: Banking; Retail Banking
- Parent: National Securities Depository Limited
- Website: nsdlpayments.bank.in

Protean eGovernance Technologies (earlier known as NSDL e-Governance Infrastructure Limited) was a former subsidiary. It works on Digital Public Infrastructure and Open Source software as well as offers services related to issuance of PAN cards and also acts as central record-keeping agency for National Pension System (NPS).

== See also ==
- Demat account
- Depository participant
- Central Depository Services Limited (CDSL)
- Asia-Pacific Central Securities Depository Group
