= Income-tax Act, 1961 =

Indian law

Parliament of India
- Long title: An Act to consolidate and amend the law relating to income-tax and super-tax.
- Citation: Act 43 of 1961
- Territorial extent: whole of India
- Assented to by: President Rajendra Prasad
- Assented to: 13 September 1961
- Commenced: 1 April 1962
- Repealed: 1 April 2026

Legislative history
- Bill title: Income-tax Bill

Repeals
- Indian Income Tax Act, 1922

Repealed by
- Income-tax Act, 2025
- Status: Repealed

The Income Tax Act, 1961 (Act 43 of 1961) was the charging statute of income tax in India. It provides for the levy, administration, collection, and recovery of income tax.

The Income-tax Act, 2025 replaced Income Tax Act, 1961. After governing India's direct tax system for over six decades and surviving countless amendments, the Income-tax Act, 1961 was formally replaced by the Income-tax Act, 2025, which came into effect on 1 April 2026 — introducing a cleaner structure of 536 sections across 23 chapters, while keeping tax rates and slabs unchanged

== Amendments ==
The Government of India presents the finance bill (budget) every year in the month of February. The finance budget brings various amendments in the Income Tax Act, 1961 including tax slabs rates. The amendments are generally applicable to the following financial year beginning from 1 April unless otherwise specified. Such amendments become part of the Income Tax Act after receiving approval of the President of India.

The partial budget presented for a non-full financial year, typically during a General Election year in India, is called a "Vote on Account." It is introduced to ensure the continuation of essential government expenditures required for the smooth functioning of the country. A full-fledged budget is presented once a new government is formed.

== Scope of total income ==
The scope of total income is contingent on the category of the taxpayer and their residential status in India. For example, a person resident in India is liable to pay income tax in India on his total world income. On the other hand, a person non-resident in India is liable to pay tax in India only on his Indian income. Under the Income Tax Act, there are five heads of income: salary, house property, business or profession, capital gains, and other sources. Total income consists of income computed under these heads. The tax on total income is computed as per the tax rates specified for the year during which the income is earned.

== Simplification ==
The Union Government established a panel, led by Arbind Modi, to overhaul and simplify the income tax laws. On 22 November 2017, the government formed a task force to draft a new direct tax law, replacing the existing Income Tax Act, which has been in effect since 1961. Arbind Modi, a member of the Central Board of Direct Taxes (CBDT), will lead the six-member panel, with Chief Economic Advisor Arvind Subramanian serving as a permanent special invitee.

== Notable cases ==
- Cairn Energy and Government of India dispute
- Vodafone International Holdings B.V. vs. Union of India & Anr.

== See also ==
- Income Computation and Disclosure Standards
