= Depository participant =

Indian banking intermediary

In India, a Depository Participant (DP) is described as an Agent of the depository. They are the intermediaries between the depository and the investors. The relationship between the DPs and the depository is governed by an agreement made between the two under the Depositories Act. In a strictly legal sense, a DP is an entity who is registered as such with SEBI under the sub section 1A of Section 12 of the SEBI Act. As per the provisions of this Act, a DP can offer depository-related services only after obtaining a certificate of registration from SEBI. As of 2012, there were 288 DPs of NSDL and 563 DPs of CDSL registered with SEBI.

SEBI (D&P) Regulations, 1996 prescribe a minimum net worth of Rs. 50 lakh for stockbrokers, R&T agents and non-banking finance companies (NBFC), for granting them a certificate of registration to act as DPs. If a stockbroker seeks to act as a DP in more than one depository, he should comply with the specified net worth criterion separately for each such depository. No minimum net worth criterion has been prescribed for other categories of DPs; however, depositories can fix a higher net worth criterion for their DPs.

== Basics of Depository ==
Depository is an institution or a kind of organization which holds securities with it in De-Mat form, in which trading is done among shares, debentures, mutual funds, derivatives, F&O and commodities. The intermediaries perform their actions in variety of securities at Depository on behalf of their clients. These intermediaries are known as Depositories Participants (DPs). Fundamentally, There are two sorts of depositories in India. One is the National Securities Depository Limited (NSDL) and the other is the Central Depository Service (India) Limited (CDSL). Every Depository Participant (DP) needs to be registered under this Depository before it begins its operation or trade in the market.

== How a depository operates ==
Depository interacts with its clients / investors through its agents, called Depository Participants normally known as DPs.

For any investor / client, to avail the services provided by the Depository, has to open Depository account, known as Demat A/c, with any of the DPs.

=== Demat Account Opening ===
A demat account is opened on the same lines as that of a Bank Account. Prescribed Account opening forms are available with the DP, needs to be filled in. Standard Agreements are to be signed by the Client and the DP, which details the rights and obligations of both parties. Along with the form the client requires to attach Photographs of Account holder, Attested copies of proof of residence and proof of identity needs to be submitted along with the account opening form.

In case of corporate clients, additional attachments required are - true copy of the resolution for Demat a/c opening along with signatories to operate the account and true copy of the Memorandum and Articles of Association is to be attached.

== Services provided by Depository ==
- Dematerialisation (usually known as demat) is converting physical certificates of Securities to electronic form
- Rematerialisation, known as remat, is reverse of demat, i.e. getting physical certificates from the electronic securities
- Transfer of securities, change of beneficial ownership
- Settlement of trades done on exchange connected to the Depository
- Pledging and Unpledging of Securities for loan against shares
- Corporate action benefits directly transfer to the Demat and Bank account of customer

== No. of Depository in the country ==
Currently there are two depositories operational in India.

- National Securities Depository Limited - NSDL - Having 2 crores Demat A/c as on 30-06-2020
- Central Depository Services Limited - CDSL - Having 2.3 crores Demat A/c as on 30-06-2020
