= Hindu joint family =

Extended family common in the Indian subcontinent particularly founded in India

A Hindu joint family or Hindu undivided family is an extended family arrangement prevalent among Hindus throughout the Indian subcontinent, particularly in India, consisting of multiple generations of lineal male descendants from a common ancestor, living in the same household with the wives and unmarried daughters of these descendants.

Hindu Undivided Family (‘HUF’) is treated as a ‘person’ under section 2(31) of the Income-tax Act, 1961. HUF is a separate entity for the purpose of assessment under the Act. Except for Kerala, HUF is recognized throughout India.

== Family structure ==
Historically, for generations India had an unexpected prevailing tradition of the Joint Hindu Family or undivided family. The system is an extended family arrangement prevalent throughout the Indian subcontinent, consisting of many generations living in the same home, all bound by the common relationship. A joint family consists of a husband and wife, their sons, their unmarried daughters, and their sons’ wives and children. The same pattern (sons, their wives and children, and unmarried daughters) repeats for as many generations as are currently alive. Any number of these people may be deceased, without impacting the legal existence of the family.

The family is headed by a senior person called a 'Karta', usually the oldest man, who makes decisions on economic and social matters on behalf of the entire family. Other members of the family are known as 'coparceners'. The patriarch's wife generally exerts control over the household and minor religious practices and often wields considerable influence in domestic matters. Family income flows into a common pool, from which resources are drawn to meet the needs of all members, which are regulated by the heads of the family. However, with urbanization and economic development, India has witnessed a break up of traditional joint family into more nuclear-like families, and the traditional joint family in India accounted for a small number of Indian households.

A Hindu undivided family or HUF is a legal term related to the Hindu Marriage Act. The female members are also given the right of share to the property in the HUF. The term finds reference in the provisions of the Income Tax Act, but the expression is not defined in the act. There are various aspects of Hindu law relevant for the purpose assessment of income of HUF with Hindu Succession Act 1956 and Income Tax Act 1961 and wealth in the status of HUF, as well as the impact of the provisions of Hindu Succession Act 1956 as amended by Hindu Succession (Amendment) Act 2005 relevant for the purpose of assessment of income and wealth in the status of HUF under the Income Tax Act 1961.

In the case of Surjit Lal Chhabra 101 ITR 776 SC, joint family and undivided family are synonymous: "A joint Hindu family consists of persons lineally descended from a common ancestor and includes their wives and unmarried daughters. The daughter, on marriage, ceases to be a member of her father's family and becomes a member of her husband's family."

In 2016, a judgment of the Delhi High Court ruled that the eldest female member of a Hindu Undivided Family can be its 'Karta' (manager).

=== Relationships ===
Different family members are addressed via different names. The nature of relationship also varies. Relations can be of equivalence, mutual respect or teasing in nature. However modern individualism has been a threat to the family collective unit, and those living in modern joint families find themselves feeling confined or captive under the watch of too many family members.

In a traditional joint Hindu family, there is a subservient relationship between the wives of the brothers: the patriarch's wife is addressed as "Bari Bhabhi" (in Hindi), meaning "eldest brother's wife." She is traditionally considered the head of the house after the elders and is in charge of running the household affairs and overseeing the servants (if any). The subsequent younger brothers' wives typically seek her advice and permission for any matters/decisions regarding the household and rearing of the children.

== See also ==
- Nuclear family
- Extended family
