= Western India =

Group of Western Indian states

Coordinates: 19.0000°N 74.1500°E

Western India West India
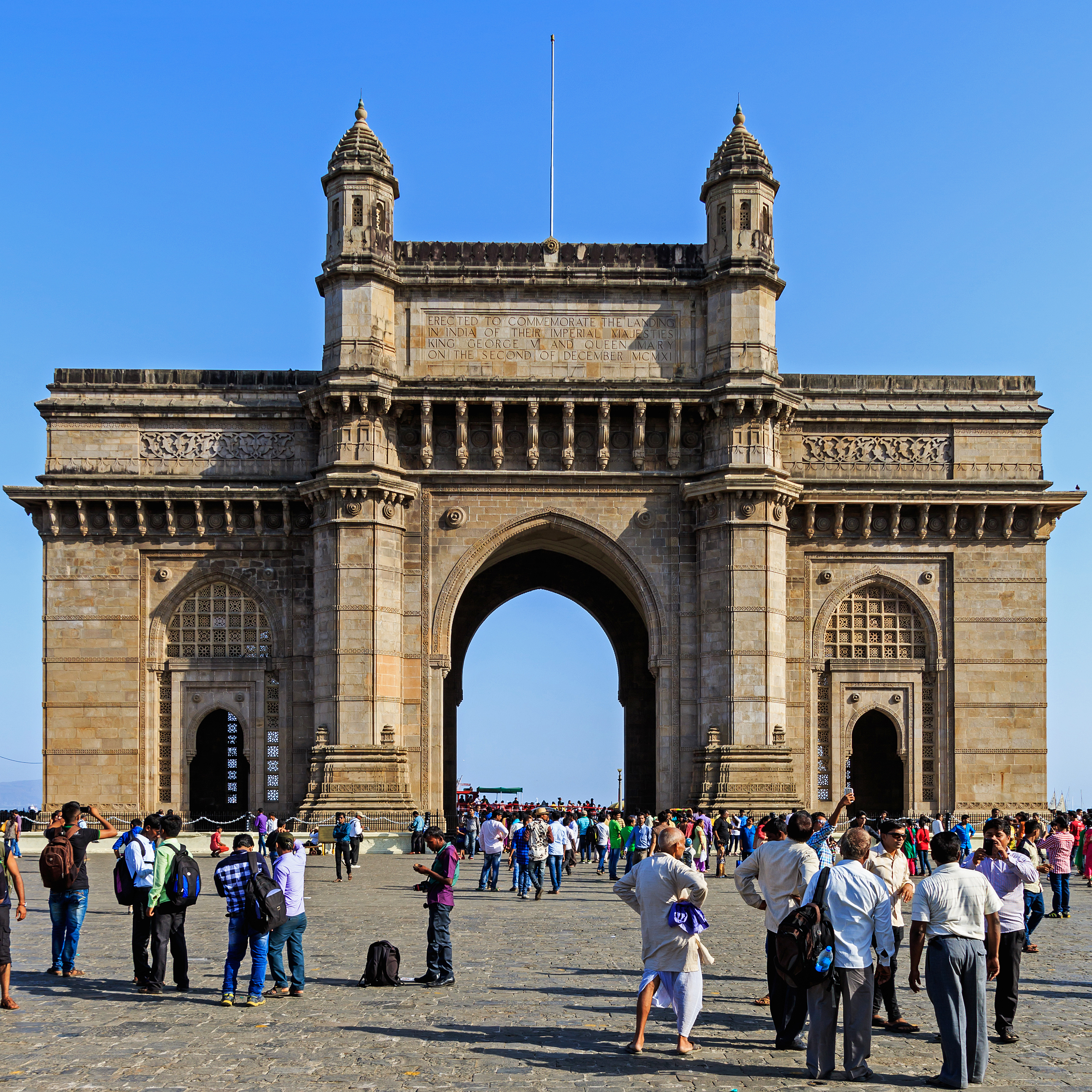
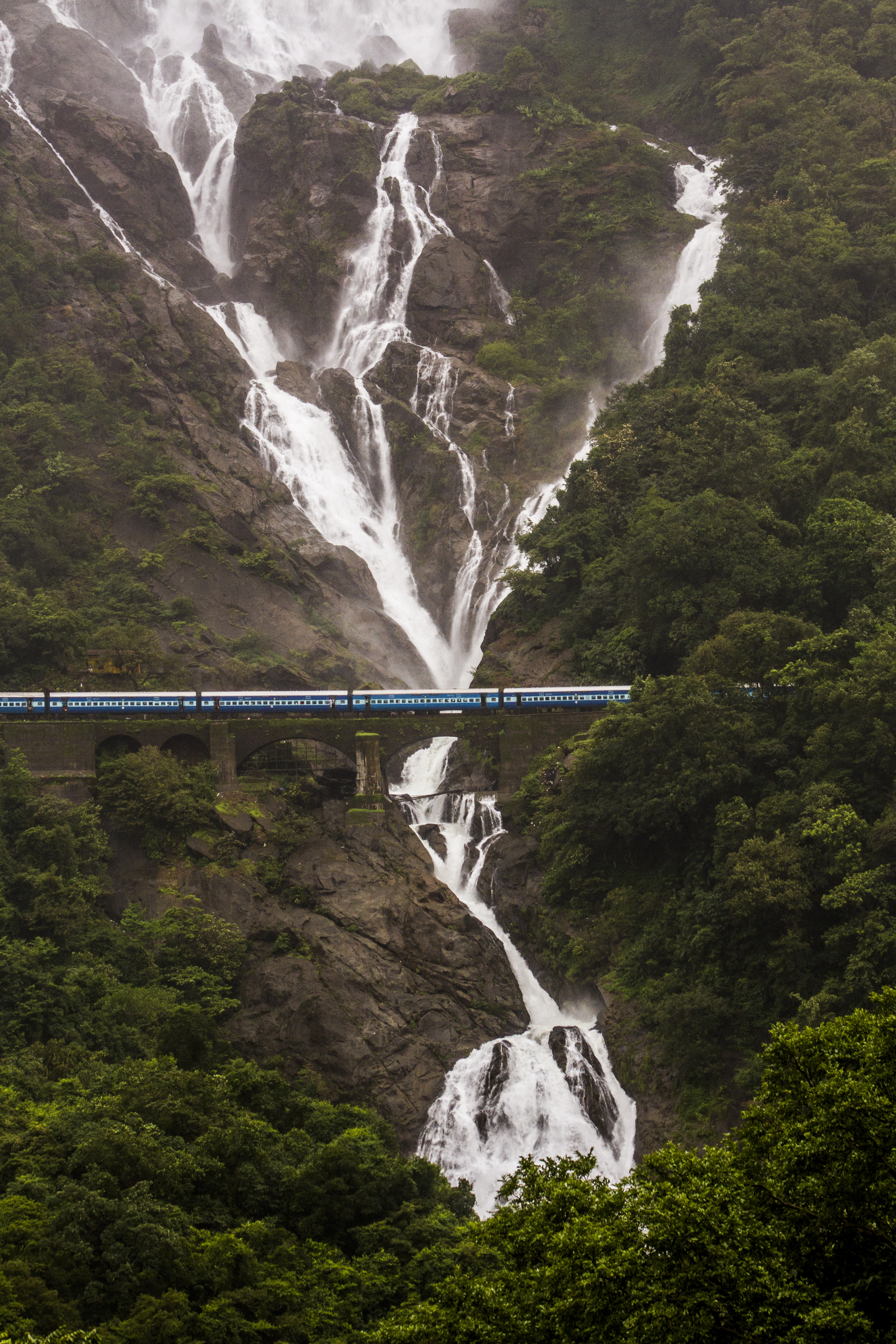
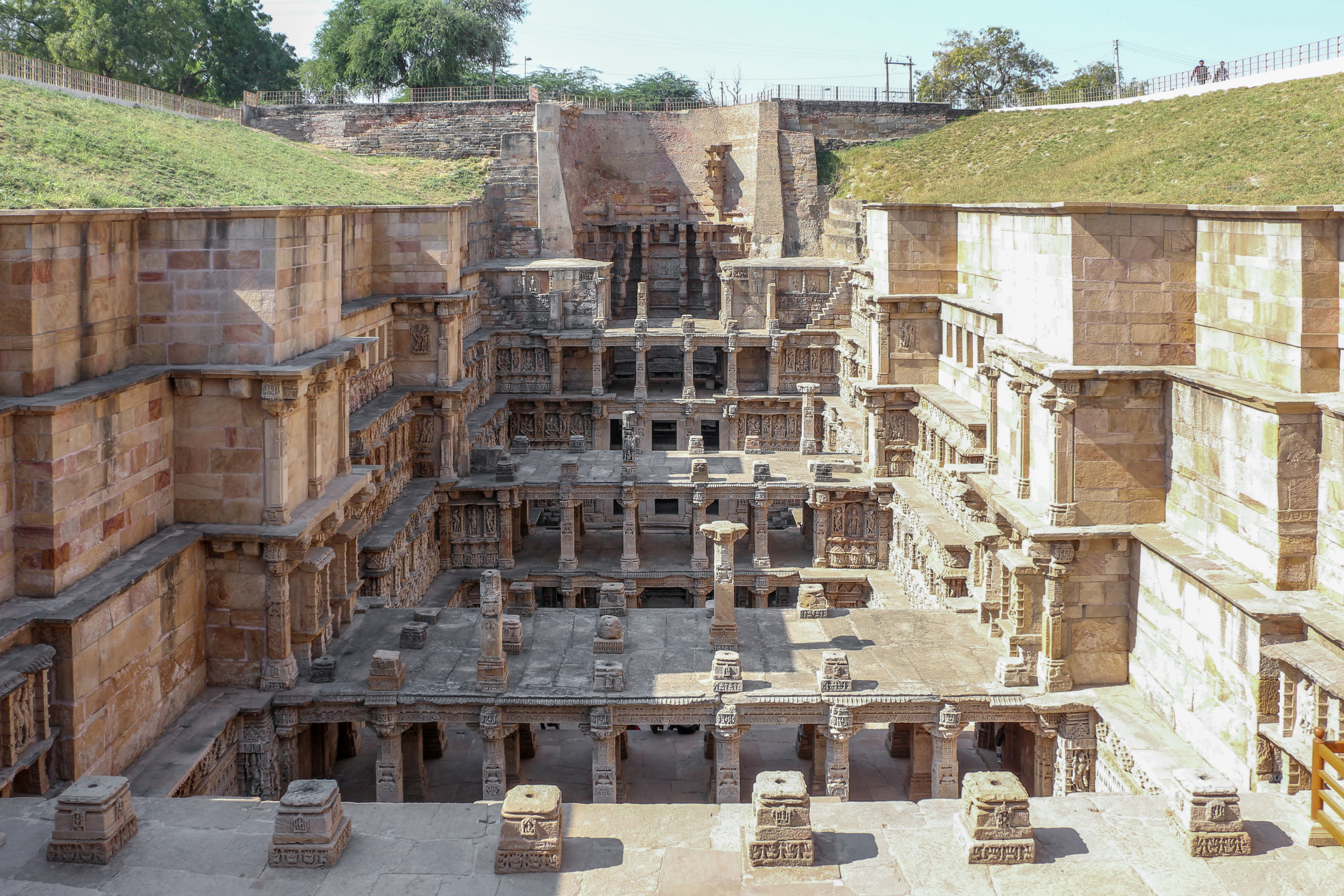
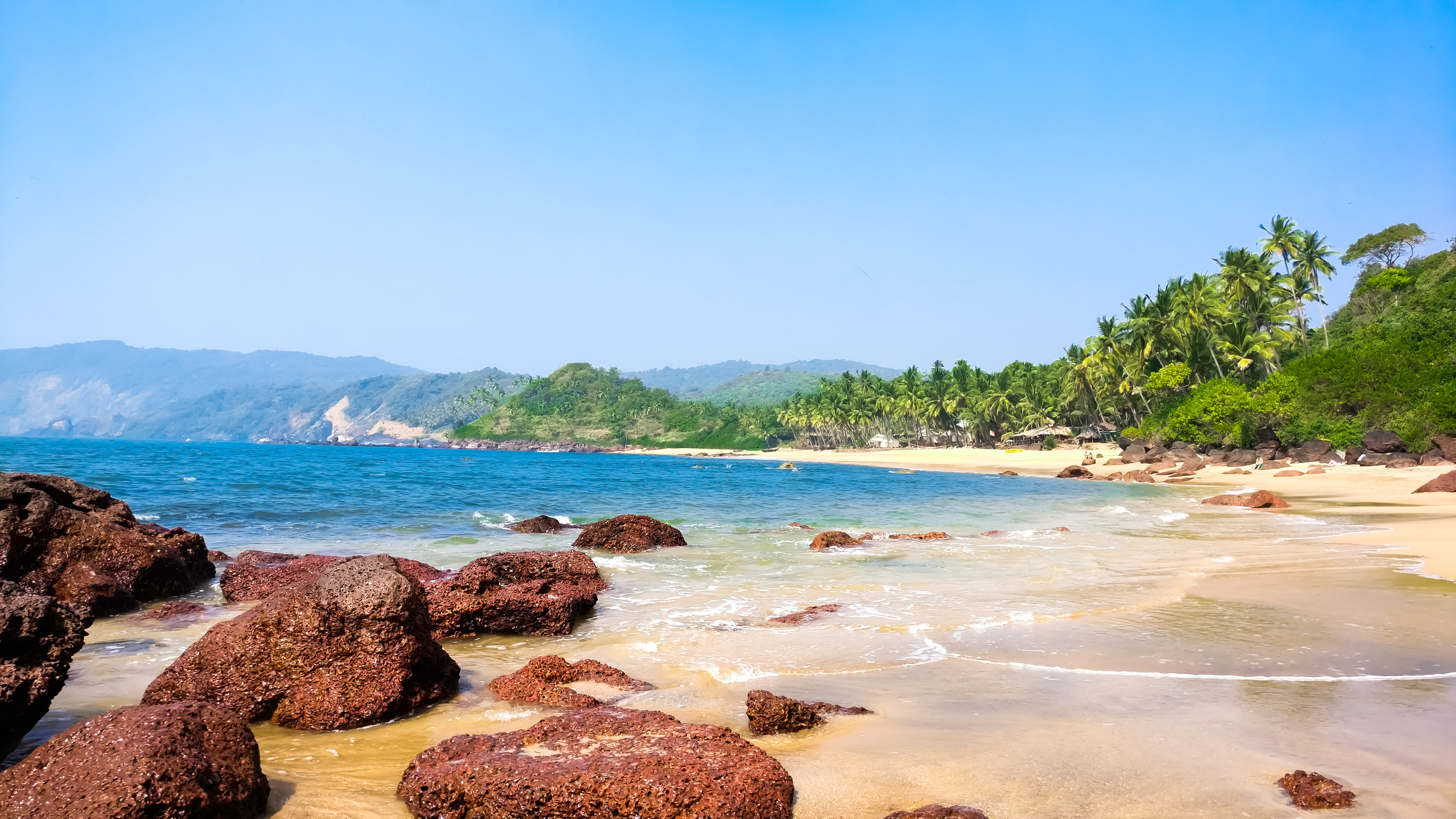
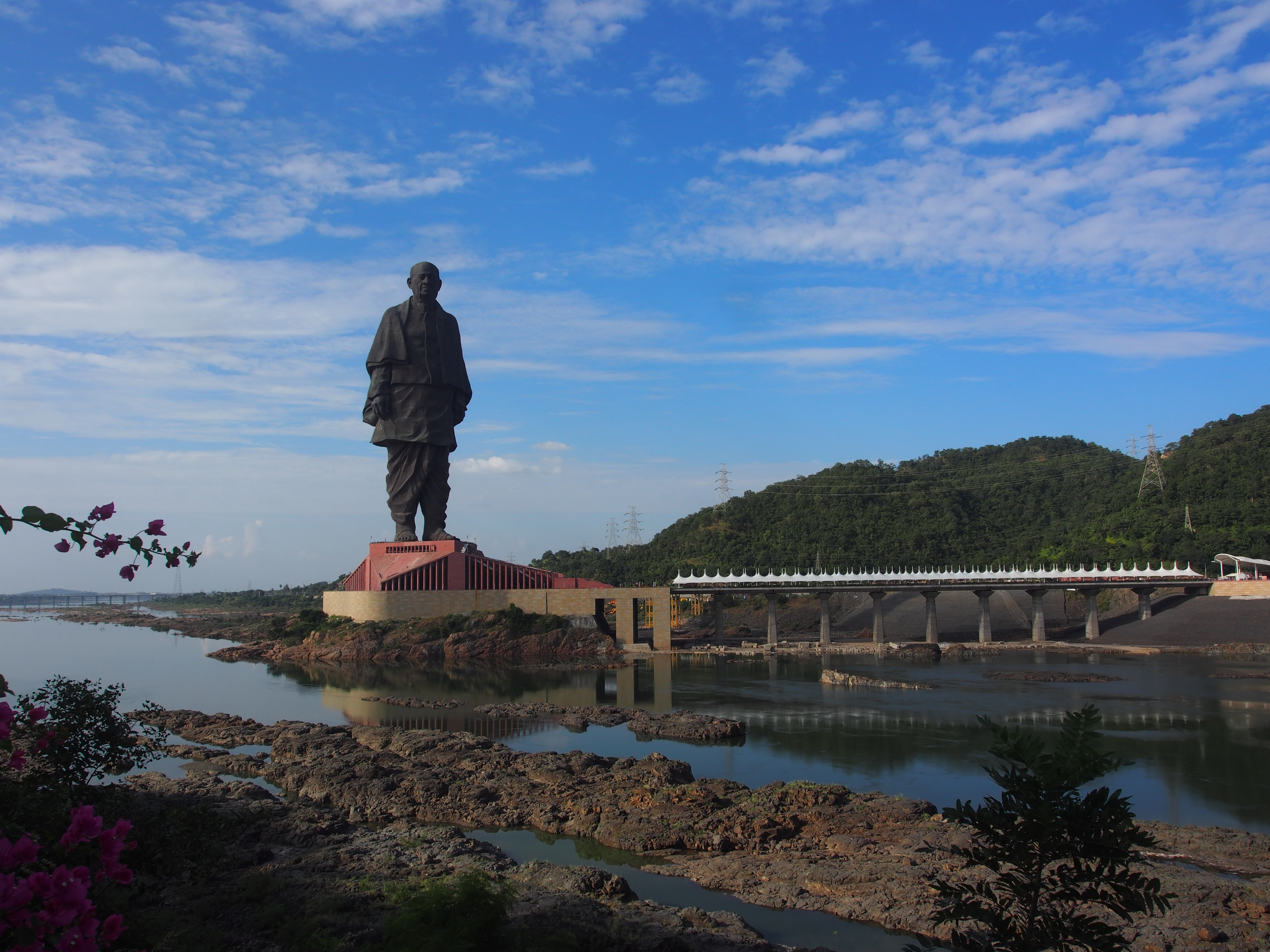
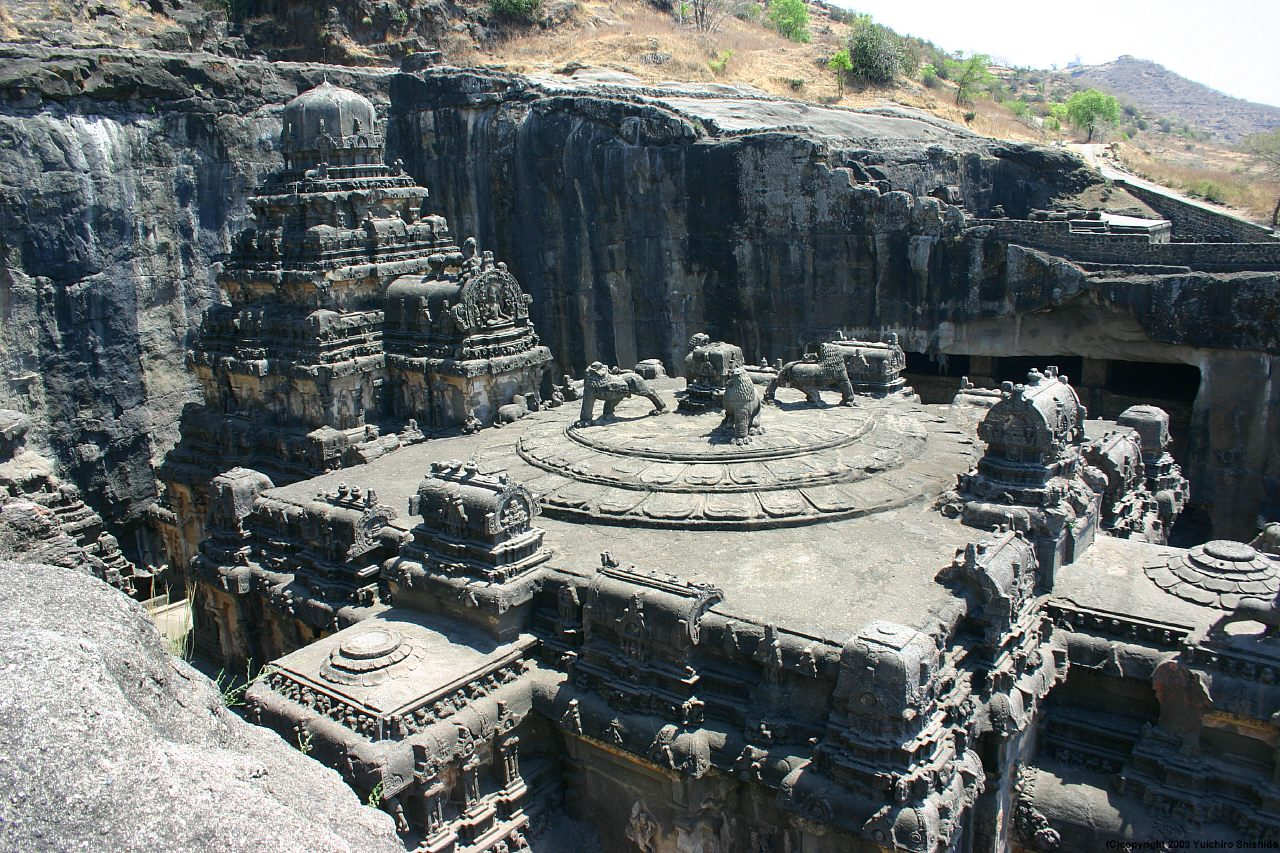
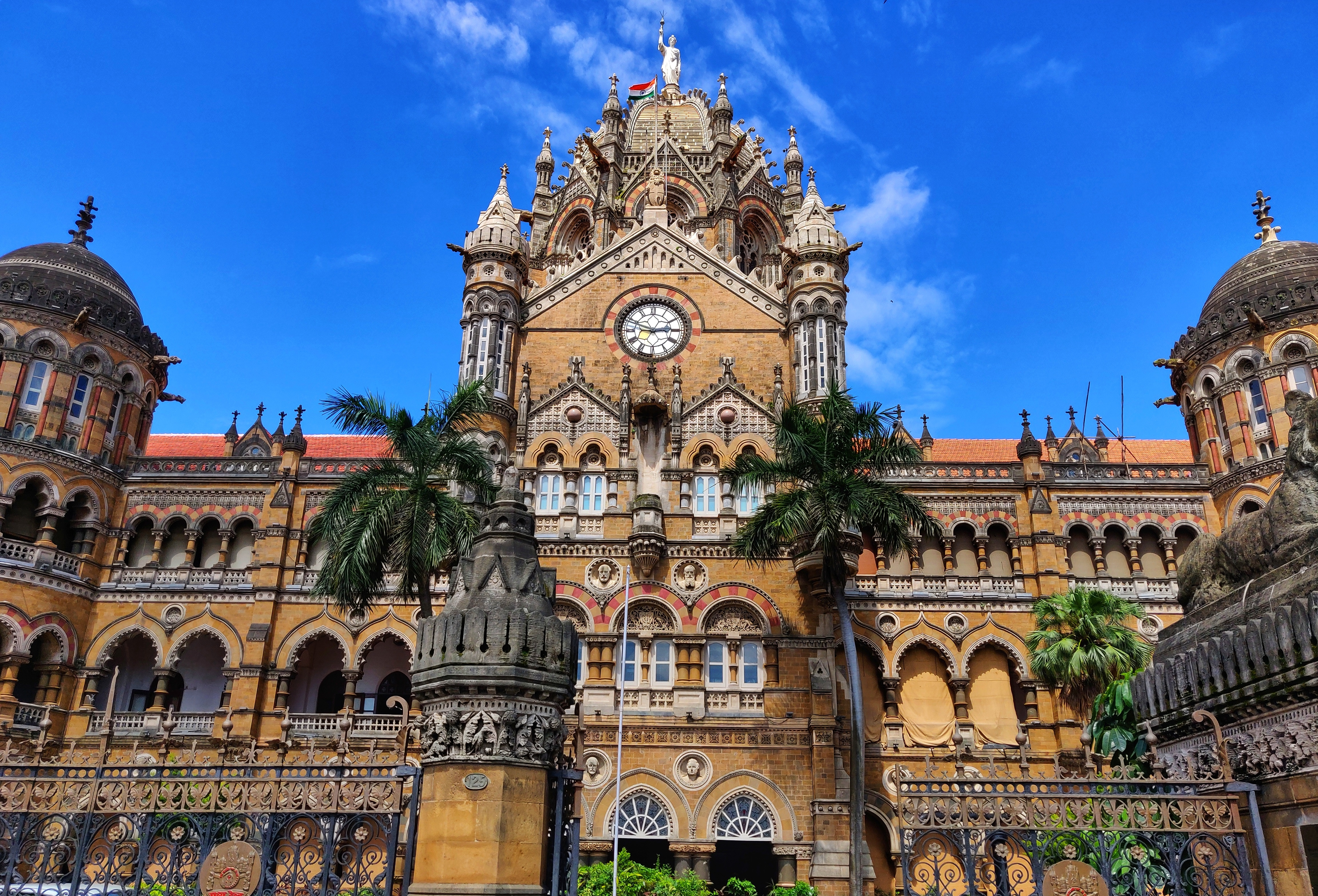
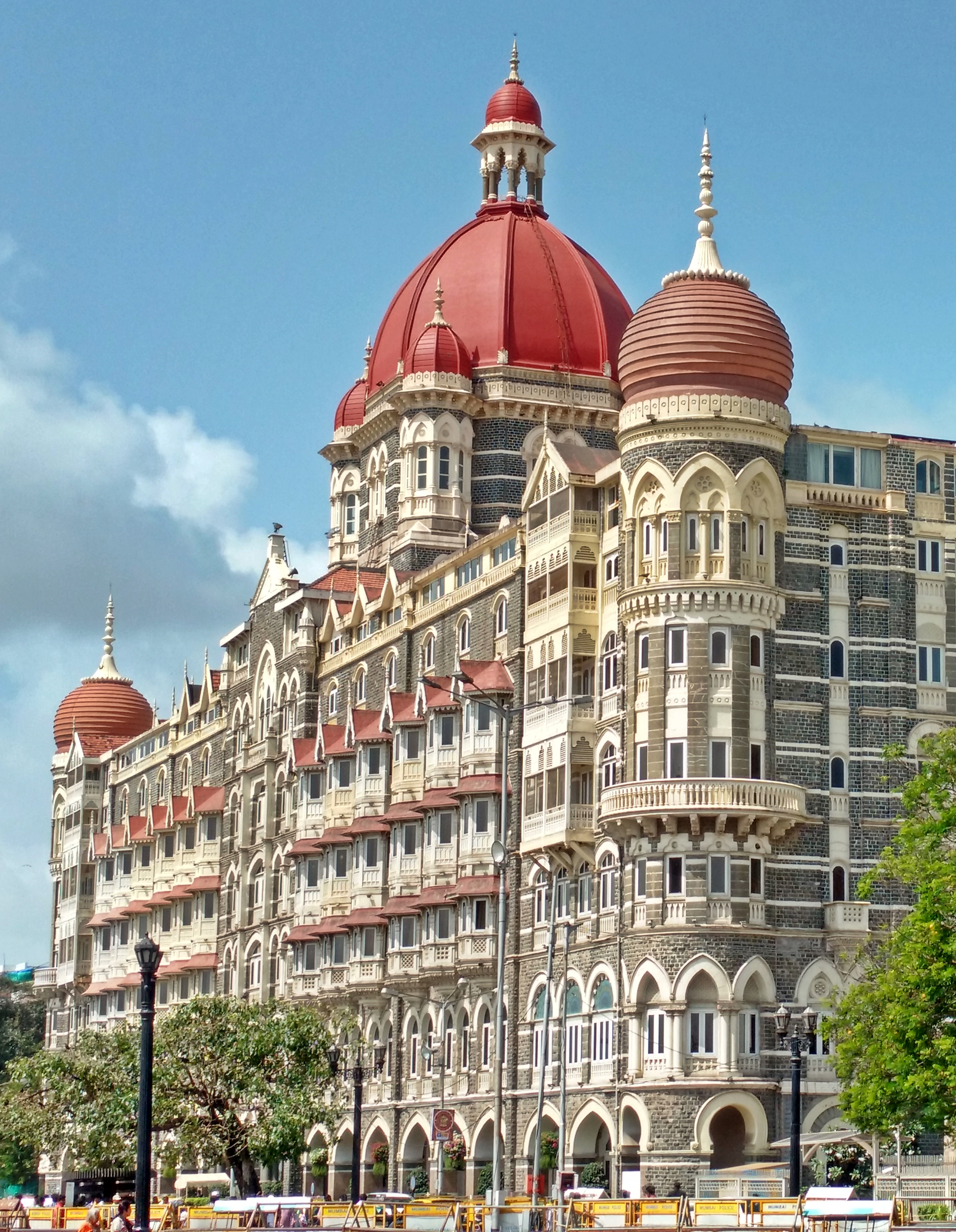
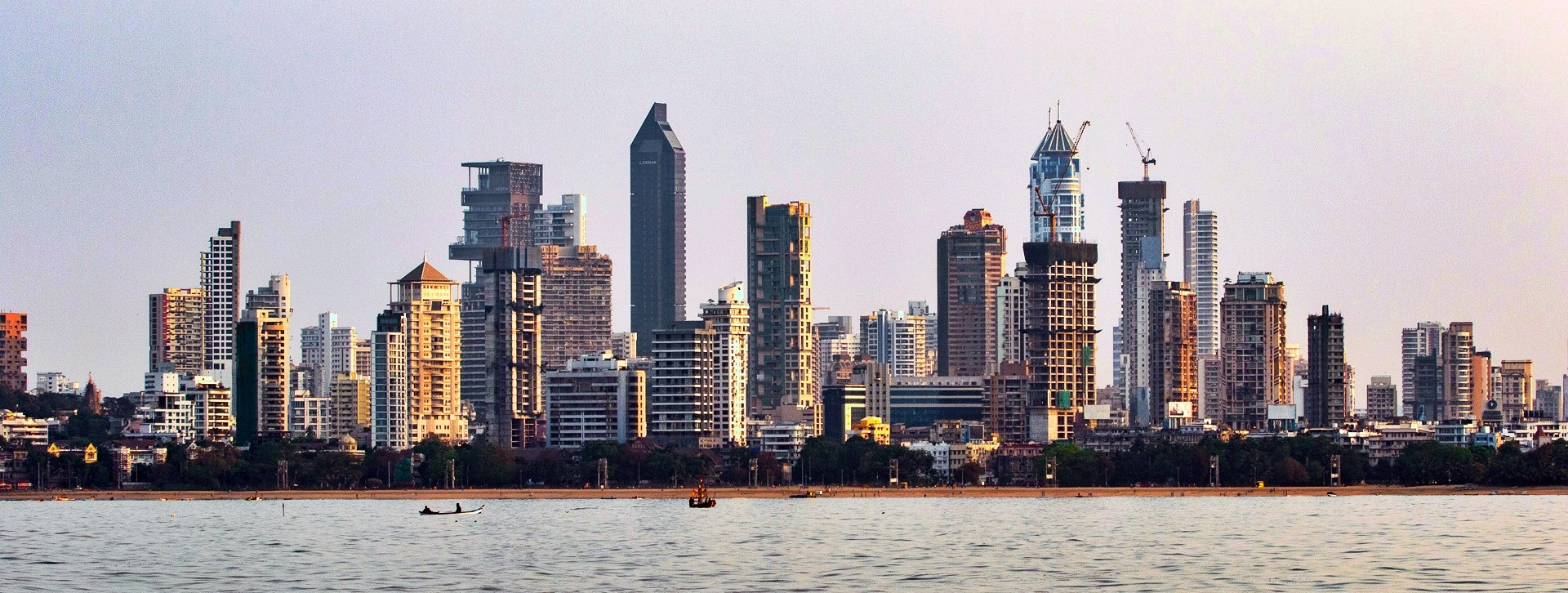
- From top, left to right: Gateway of India, Mumbai; Dudhsagar Falls, Goa; Rani ki Vav, Gujarat; Agonda Beach, Goa; Statue of Unity, Gujarat; Kailasa Temple, Maharashtra; Chhatrapati Shivaji Terminus, Mumbai; Taj Mahal Palace Hotel, Mumbai; Skyline of Mumbai across Back Bay

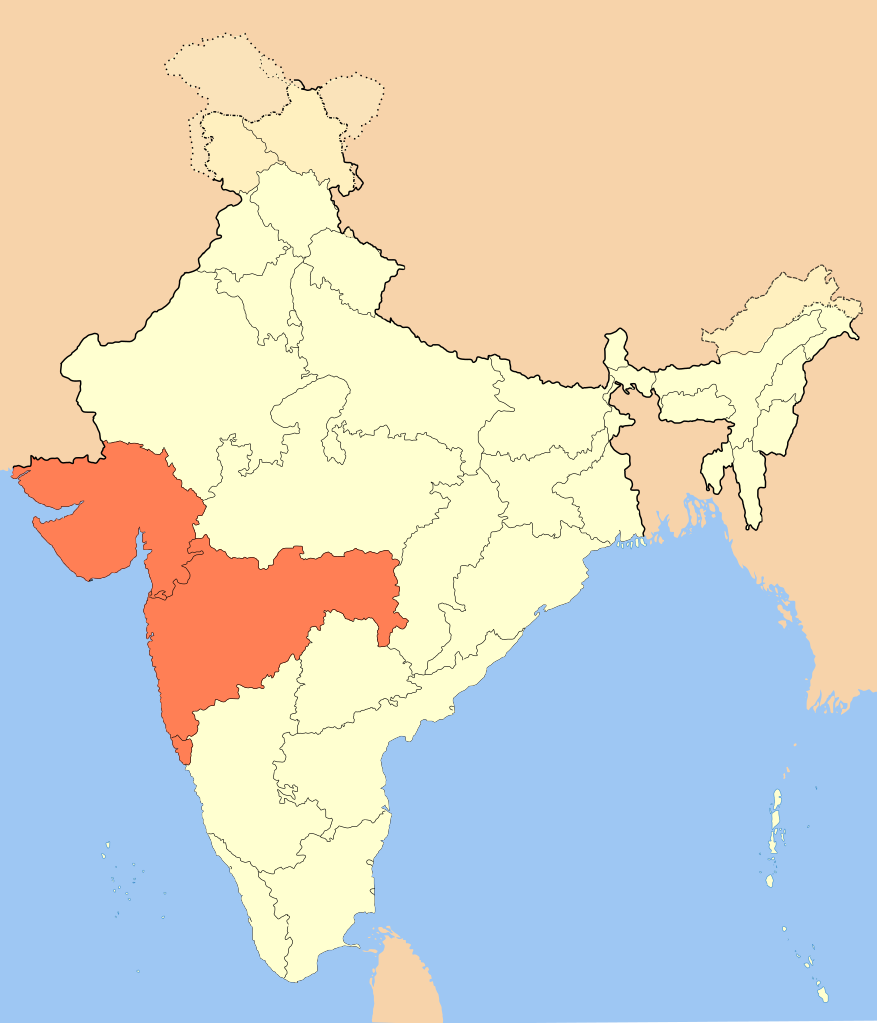
- States and union territories in Western India
- Country: India
- States and union territories: Dadra and Nagar Haveli and Daman and Diu; Goa; Gujarat; Maharashtra
- Other states sometimes included: Rajasthan; Karnataka; Madhya Pradesh
- Largest city: Mumbai
- Most populous cities (2011): Dadra and Nagar Haveli and Daman and Diu: Silvassa; Daman; Diu; Amli; Goa: Mormugao; Margao; Mapusa; Panaji; Curchorem; Gujarat: Ahmedabad; Surat; Vadodara; Rajkot; Bhavnagar; Maharashtra: Mumbai; Pune; Nagpur; Nashik; Thane

Area
  - Total: 508,032 km^{2} (196,152 sq mi)

Population
  - Total: 173,343,821
  - Density: 341.207/km^{2} (883.721/sq mi)
- Time zone: IST (UTC+5:30)
- Official languages: Gujarati; Konkani; Marathi; English

Western India is a loosely defined region of India consisting of western states of Republic of India. The Ministry of Home Affairs in its Western Zonal Council administrative division includes the states of Goa, Gujarat, and Maharashtra along with the Union territory of Dadra and Nagar Haveli and Daman and Diu, while the Ministry of Culture and some historians also include the state of Rajasthan. The Geological Survey of India includes Maharashtra but excludes Rajasthan whereas Ministry of Minority Affairs includes Karnataka but excludes Rajasthan.

Madhya Pradesh is also often included and Haryana, Western Uttar Pradesh and southern Punjab are sometimes included. Western India may also refer to the western half of India, i.e. all the states west of Delhi and Chennai, thus also including Punjab, Kerala and surrounding states. The region is highly industrialised, with a large urban population. Roughly, Western India is bounded by the Thar Desert in the north, the Vindhya Range in the east and north and the Arabian Sea in the west. A major portion of Western India shares the Thar Desert with North India and Pakistan and the Deccan Plateau with South and Central India.

== History ==
In ancient history, Western India was divided into three great states according to Hwen Thsang, namely Sindh (which comprised the whole valley of the Indus from the Punjab to the sea, including the Delta and the island of Kutch), Gurjaradesa (which comprised Western Rajputana and the Indian Desert), and Balabhi (which comprised the peninsula of Gujarat, with a small portion of the adjacent coast). Before the partition of India, the now-Pakistani territories of Sindh and Balochistan were also included in this region. In art history, the term normally covers just Gujarat and Rajasthan, which tend to move together in terms of style. Western India has the second-largest gross domestic product of any region in India.

States under Western India Zonal Council in mauve

Parts of Gujarat were the site of the Indus Valley Civilisation. Places have been uncovered in Gujarat at Lothal, Surkotada, and around Ghaggar-Hakra River in Rajasthan. The Western Indian region was ruled by the Rashtrakuta Empire, the Maurya Empire, the Gupta Empire, Rajputs, Satavahanas, Western Satraps, Indo- Greeks, Kadambas etc. in the ancients times. During the medieval age, the area was under the rule of the Vaghela dynasty, the Gujarat Sultanate, and the Delhi Sultanate. Thereafter, the area was under Mughal rule. Later, the Maratha Empire, which arose in western Maharashtra, came to dominate a major portion of the Indian subcontinent. However, its defeat by the British in the Anglo-Maratha wars left most of India under colonial rule. The region then experienced great upheavals during the struggle for Indian Independence. Gandhi's Dandi March took place in Gujarat. The region became part of independent India in 1947, and the present state boundaries were drawn based on linguistic considerations in 1956.

== Geography ==
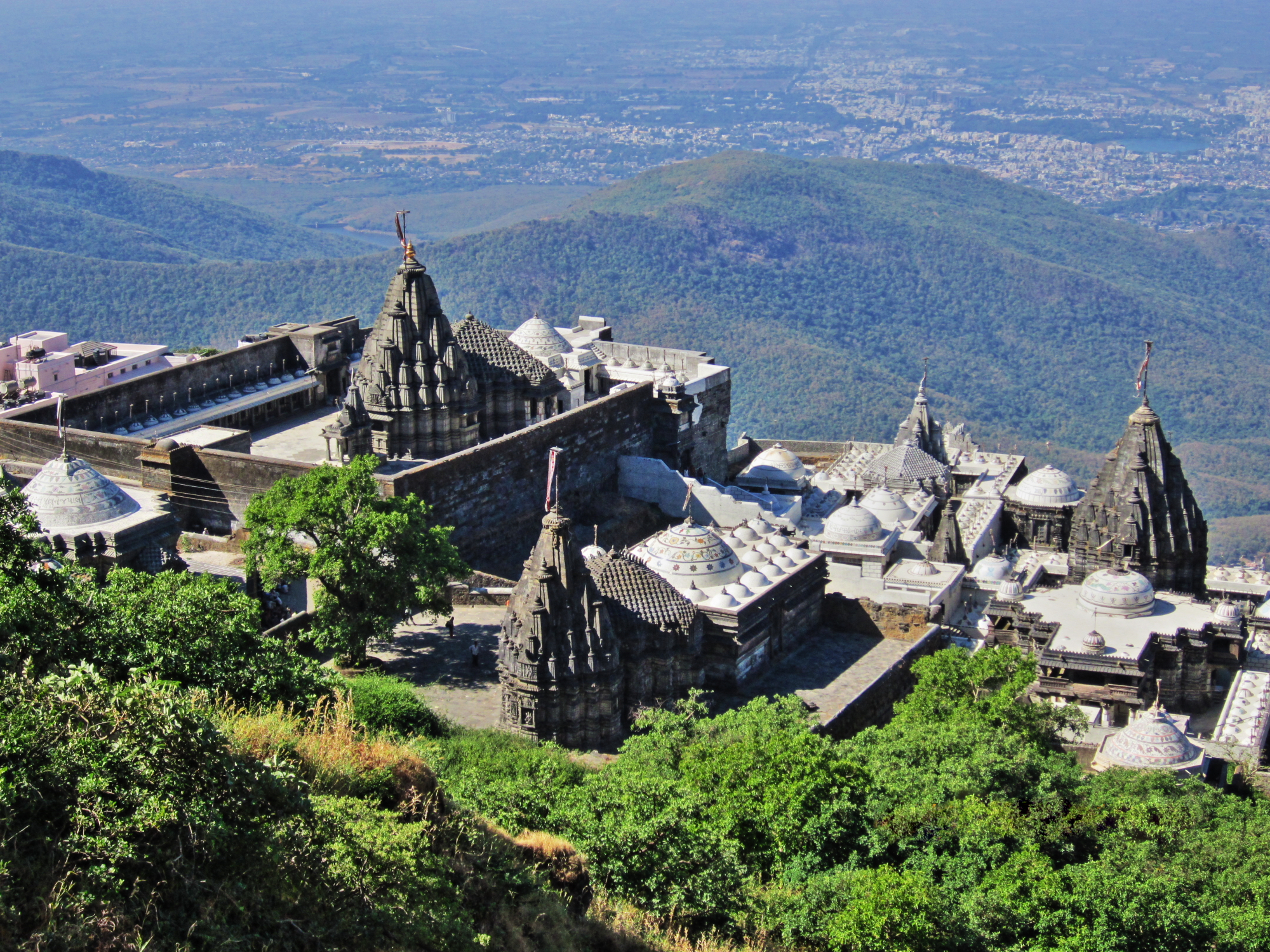
Jain Temples on Girnar Mountain range

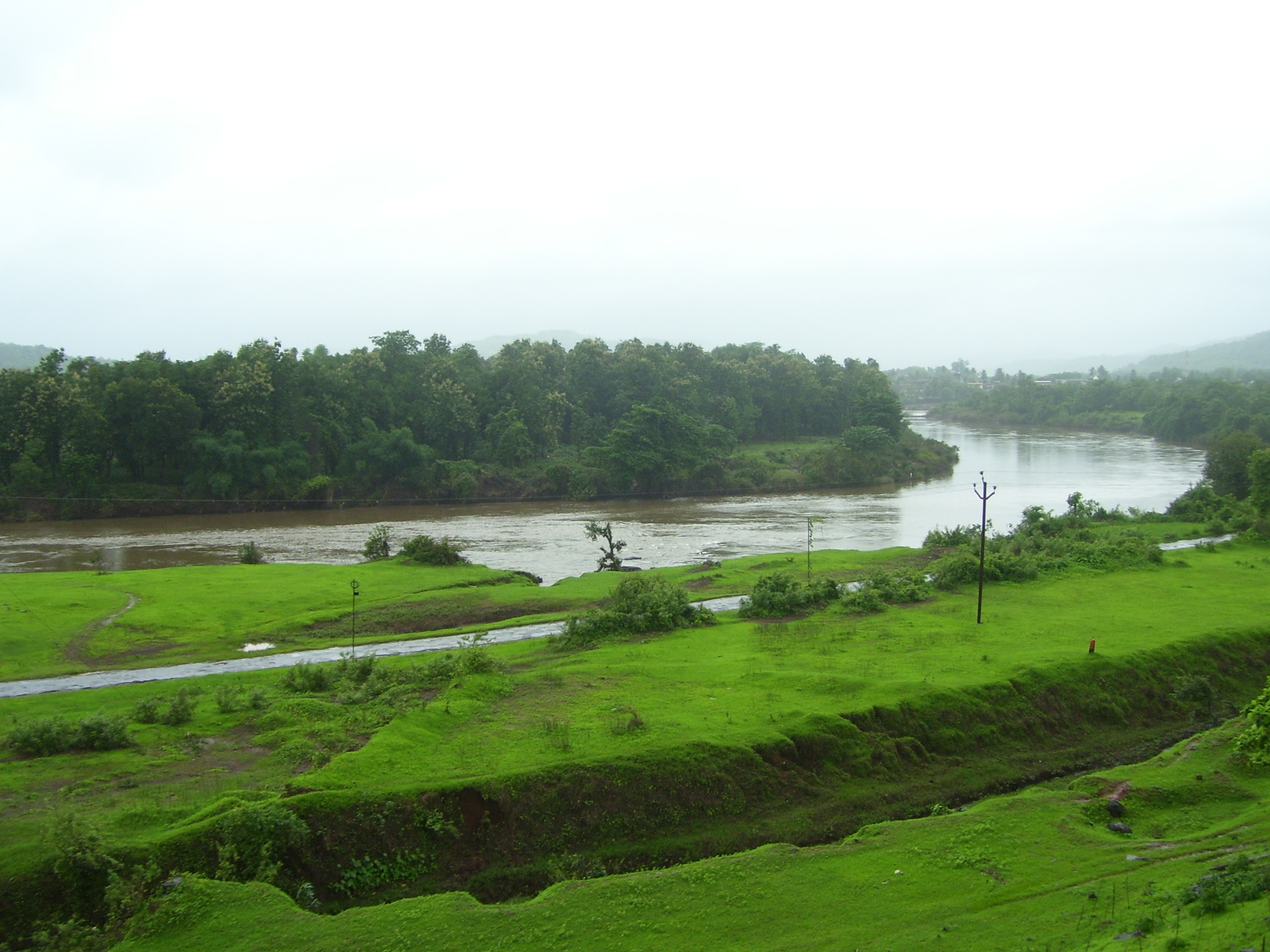
Konkan region in monsoon

The region consists of the predominantly arid to semi-arid region of Saurashtra and Kutch in the North. The region South of that of Cambay and Southern Gujarat makes the northern semi arid region and the southern humid region submerge. The Western Ghats lie along the coast of South Gujarat, Maharashtra and Goa. The Deccan Plateaus of the Vidarbha, Marathwada in central and eastern Maharashtra define the rest of the region. The vegetation varies from tropical rainforests along the Konkan coast to thorny bushes and shrubs in northern Gujarat. The rivers in this region are the Mahi, Narmada, Tapi, Godavari, Zuari, Mandovi, Krishna, Ghaggar, Chambal and many other smaller tributaries of other rivers.

== Climate ==
Mumbai, Maharashtra

Climate chart (precipitation, max. and min. temperature)
J	F	M	A	M	J	J	A	S	O	N	D
0.6 30 19	1 30 20	1.3 32 23	0.8 33 25	6 34 27	517 32 27	791 30 26	483 30 25	353 31 25	86 33 25	8.8 34 24	2.8 32 21
- █ Average max. and min. temperatures in °C
- █ Precipitation totals in mm
Imperial conversion
J	F	M	A	M	J	J	A	S	O	N	D
0 86 67	0 87 69	0.1 89 73	0 91 78	0.2 93 81	20 90 80	31 86 78	19 86 77	14 87 77	3.4 92 77	0.3 93 74	0.1 90 70
- █ Average max. and min. temperatures in °F
- █ Precipitation totals in inches

The climate varies between tropical monsoon, tropical savanna, semi arid and desert. The coastal regions experience little seasonal variations although the temperatures range between 20 °C to 38 °C. Mumbai and northern Konkan regions experience cooler winters with minimum temperatures hovering around 12 °C. Interior Maharashtra experiences hot summers with maximum temperatures averaging 40 °C and mild winters with minimum temperatures averaging about 10 °C. Pune, a city in the western region experiences temperatures around 35–40 °C in the summer and 7–12 °C in the winter. Gujarat also has a warm climate with hot summers and cool winters.

== Demographics ==
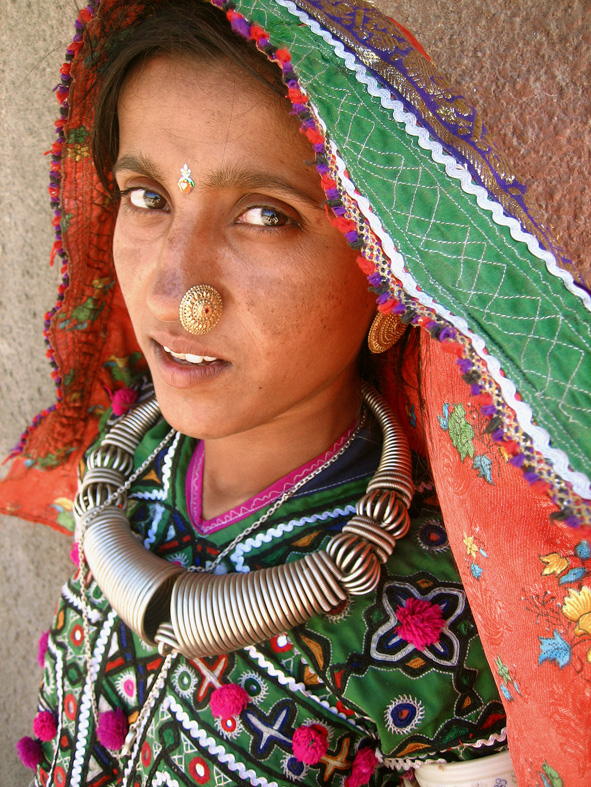
A Meghwal woman in the Hodka village, north of Bhuj.

=== Language ===
Marathi, Gujarati and Konkani are widely spoken languages in Western India.

Marathi, is the most widely spoken language in Western India with about 73 million speakers, followed by Gujarati with about 46 million speakers and Konkani 2.5 million speakers, all of which are Indo-Aryan languages. As in other parts of India, a high level of multilingualism is seen with English and Hindi being spoken as additional languages in urban areas.

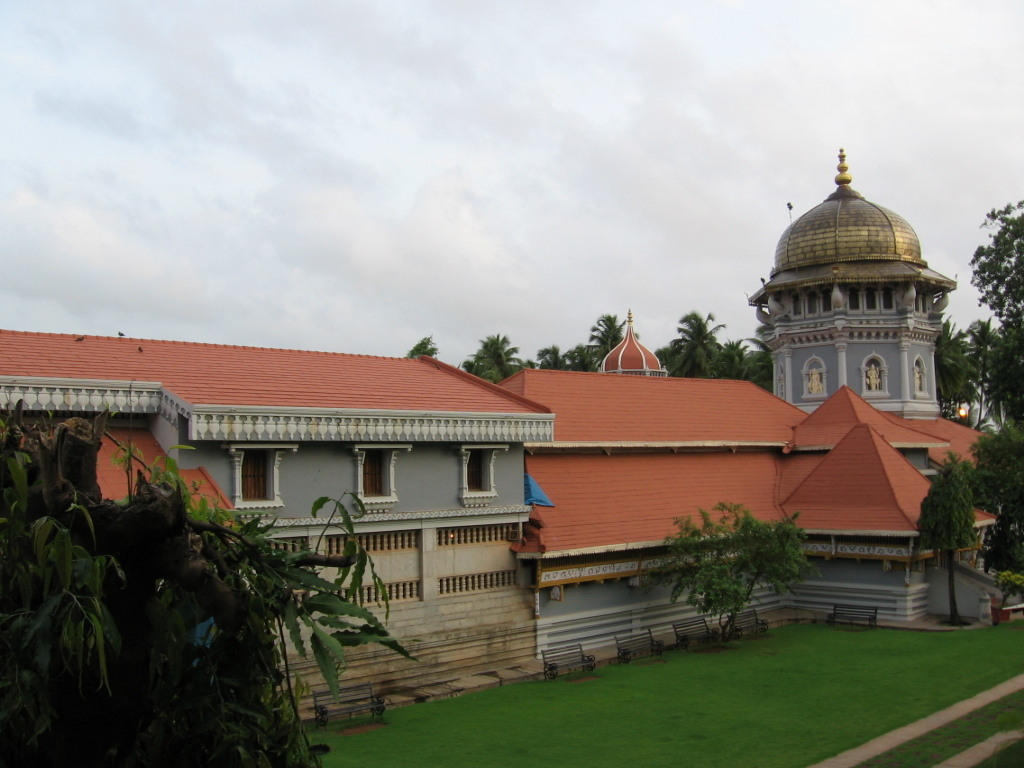
Mahalasa Temple, Goa

=== Religion ===
Religion in Western India
Religion	Percent(%)
Hinduism	83.66%
Islam	10.12%
Buddhism	4%
Others	2.22%

The majority follow Hinduism and there are significant minority who follow Islam and smaller number who follow Christianity. There are also a few indigenous Jews called the Bene Israel who speak Marathi. The Parsees who settled in Gujarat made Mumbai and Surat their home. Significant percentages of Jains and Buddhists can be found too. Most Christians live in the state of Goa.

Overall, 83.66% of the population is Hindu, 10.12% Muslim, 4% Buddhist with Christians in Goa and Maharashtra making up the majority of the remainder.

=== Literacy ===
The average literacy rate of West India is around 76%, higher than the national average of 70.5%. The population density is around 290 per square km. The average fertility rate is about 2.2, while the average household size is about 4.7.

== Culture ==
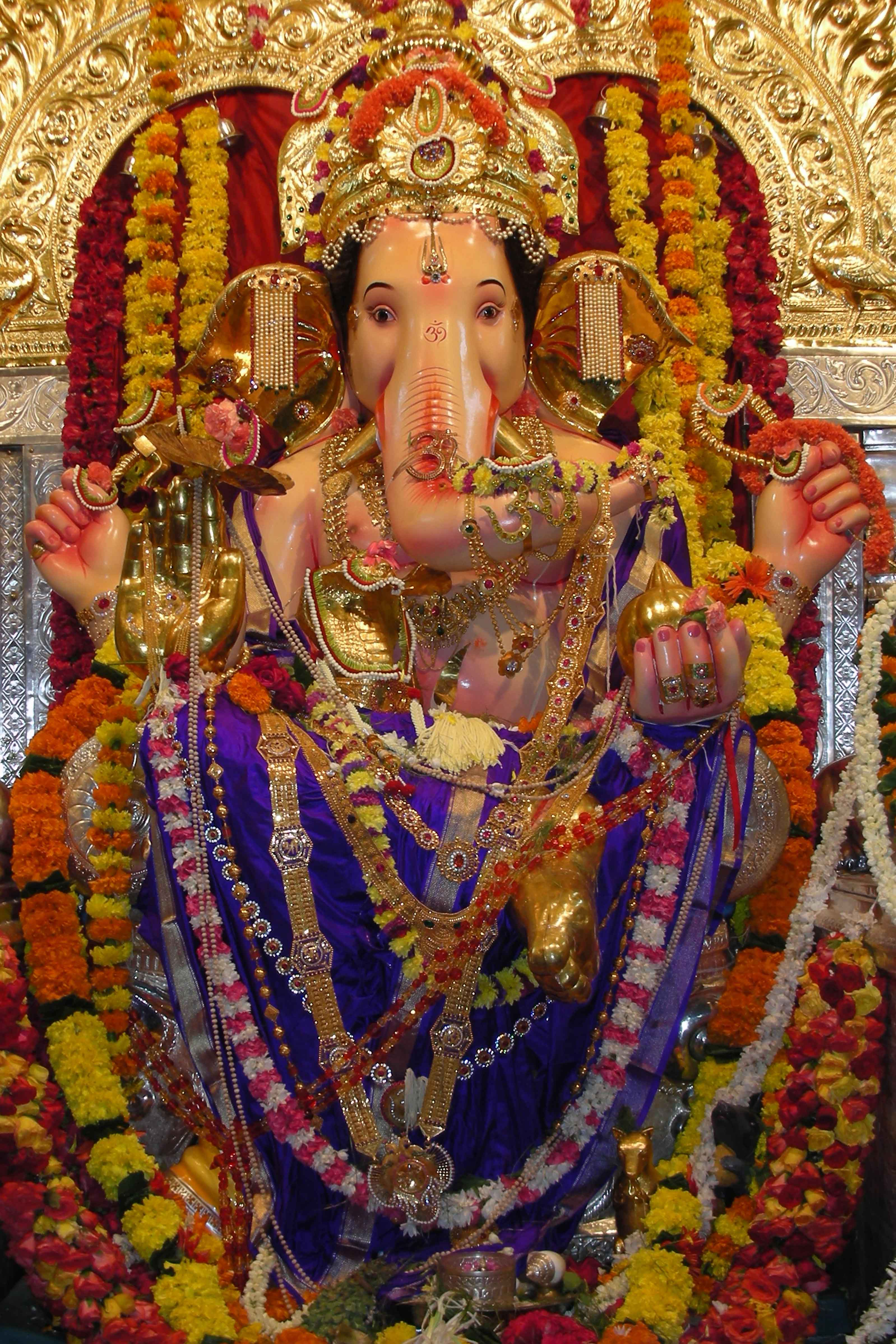
Ganesh Chaturthi, a popular festival in Maharashtra, Gujarat and Konkan region

The states of Maharashtra, Gujarat and Goa are culturally varied and distinct.

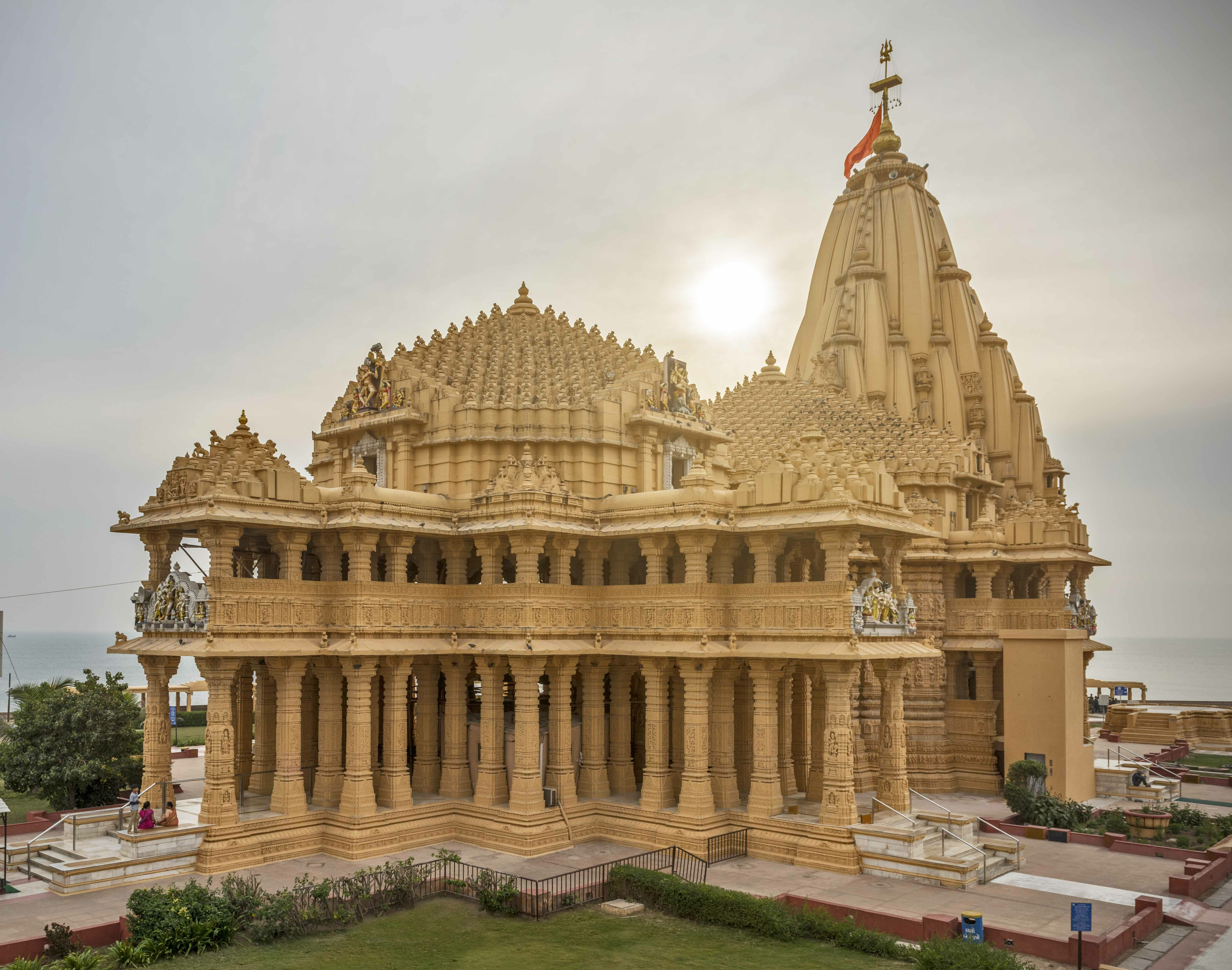
Somnath Temple, Gujarat

Maharashtrian culture derives from the ancient Hindu Vedic culture influenced deeply by the Maratha Empire. Maharashtrians take great pride in the Maratha Empire, and many places in Maharashtra are named after the founder of the Empire, Shivaji. Marathi literature and cinema are popular in the state as well as across India. Bollywood has had a huge impact on the lifestyle and culture of this part of India as the industry is primarily located in Mumbai.

Gujarati culture is a blend of Indian culture and foreign influence. It has been influenced by the Parsis, who migrated to Gujarat from Persia about a 1000 years ago. Gujarat also saw Turkic and Mughal conquests, as well as a constant stream of back and forth migrations to and from Sindh and Rajasthan, which helped shape the unique cultural landscape of the state. Cultural events like Rann Utsav, International Kite Festival and Global Garba festivals have been started in Gujarat to showcase its culture internationally.

Goa's culture is a unique blend of Indian and Portuguese cultures, as a result of it formerly being part of Portuguese India for 450 years. The state is popular among tourists for its beaches, Goan cuisine, temples, churches and architecture. The Churches and Convents of Goa have been declared as a World Heritage Site by UNESCO.

== Cuisine ==
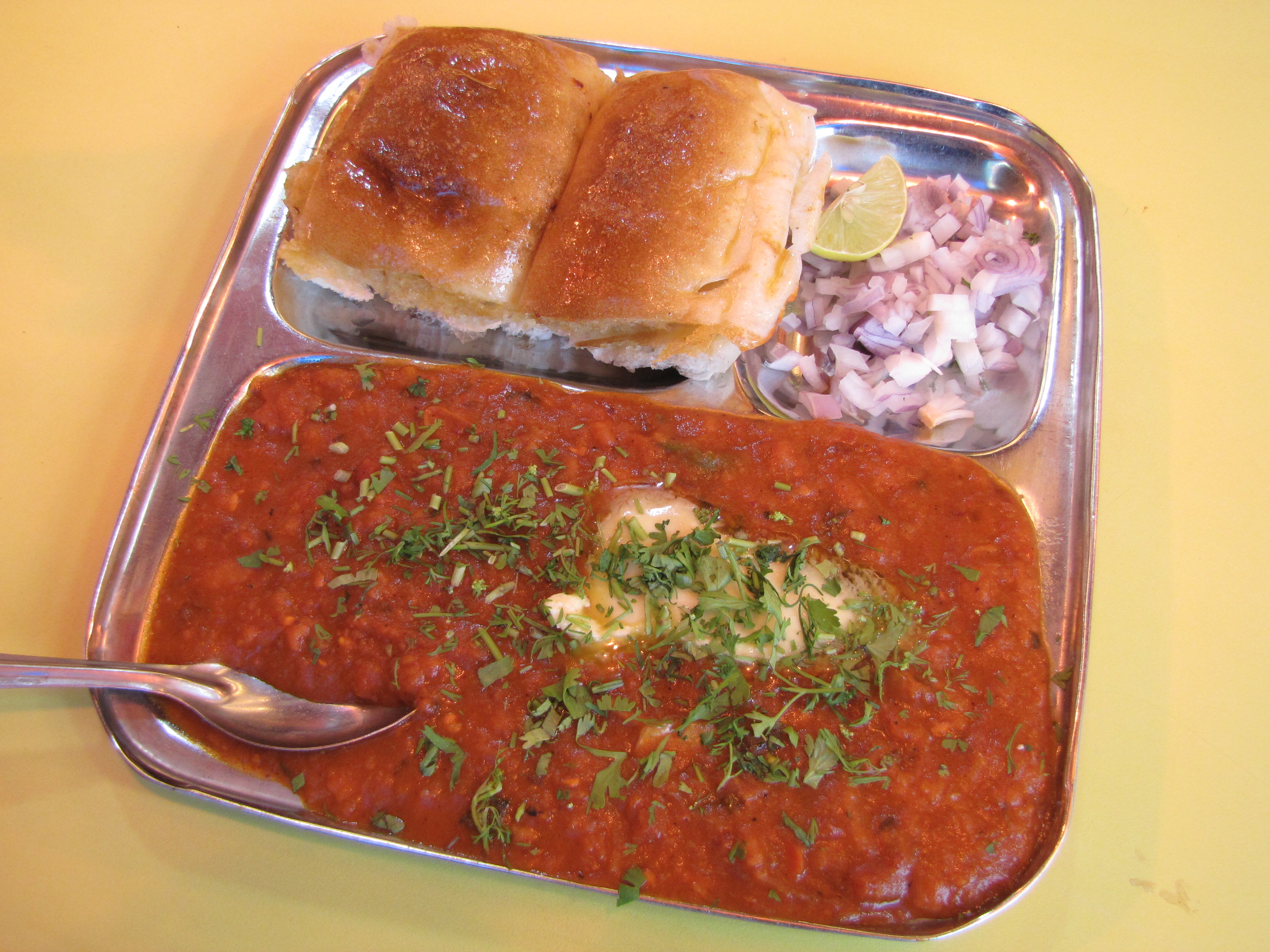
Pav bhaji from Mumbai, Maharashtra

The cuisine of Western India is diverse. Maharashtrian cuisine is diverse and ranges from bland to fiery hot. Pohay, Shrikhand, Pav bhaji and Vada pav are good examples of Maharashtrian cuisine. Goan cuisine is dominated by the use of rice, coconut, seafood, kokum and cashew-nuts. With its distinct spices and medium of cooking as coconut oil, both vegetarian as well as non-vegetarian cuisine is equally popular.

Gujarati cuisine is almost exclusively vegetarian. Gujarat is one of three states in India with prohibition on alcohol, along with Mizoram and Manipur. In contrast, Maharashtra has some of the best vineyards in India, with Nashik and Sangli districts being the country's biggest grape-producing districts.

== Economy ==
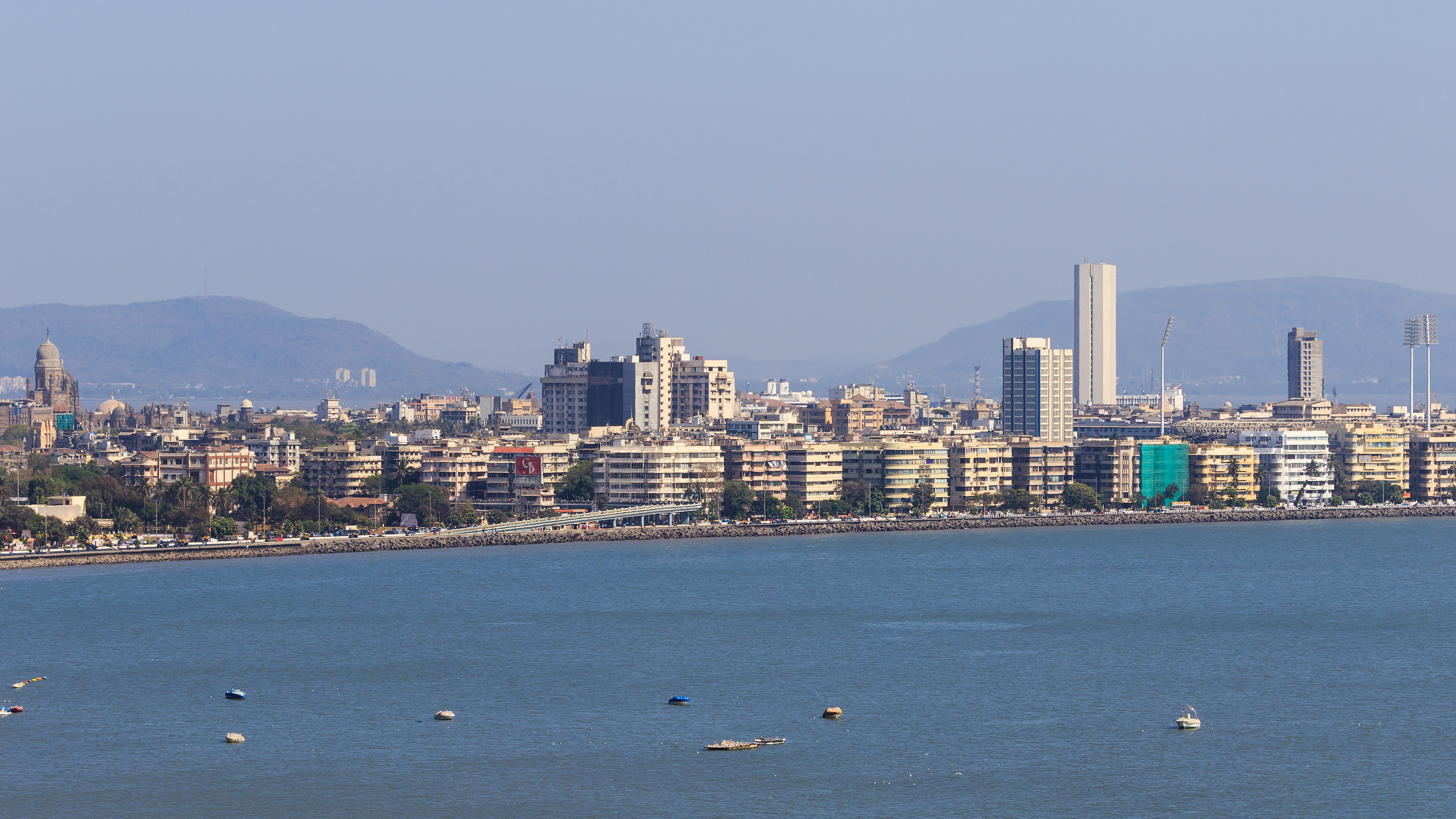
Mumbai, the financial capital of India

The region generates 24.00% of the national GDP of the country, with an annual growth rate of 14.5% as of 2006. The states generate about 23% of the tax revenues of the country. More than 85% of the households have access to electricity with about 55% owning a television. Agriculture employs most people in the region, while services have largest share in the total GDP.

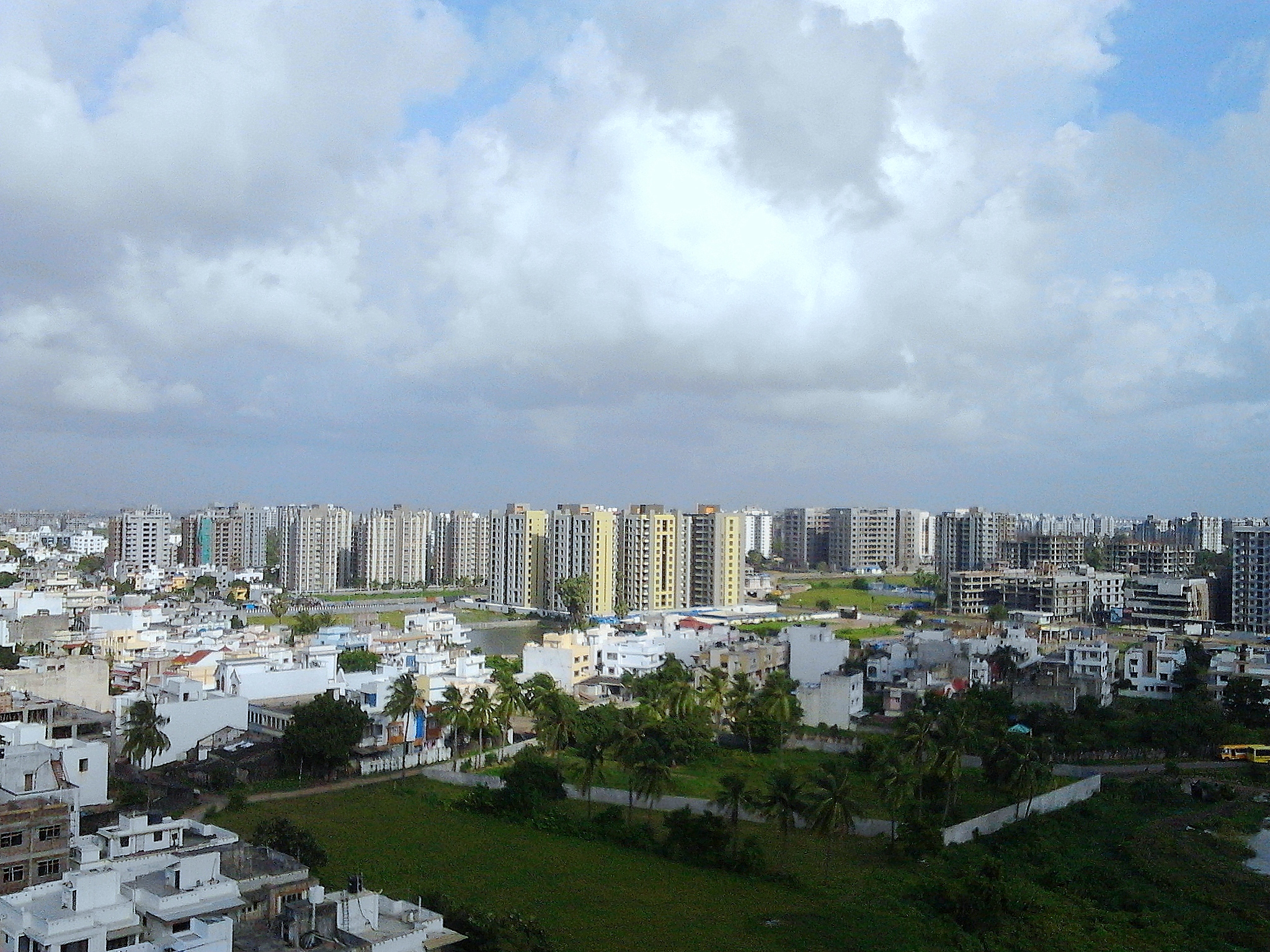
Surat, the business capital of Gujarat

Economic and demographic indicators
Parameter	West India	National
Per capita net state domestic product (SDP)	₹122,569 (US$1,300)	₹73,500 (US$790)
Share of total	24%	NA
Average annual GDP growth	13.66%	8.5%
Population below poverty line	8.66%	26.10%
Share of urban population	46.75%	31.16%
Share of households with electricity	93.6%	67.3%
Literacy rate	83.2%	74.04%

== See also ==
- East India
- North India
- Northeast India
- South India
- Central India
- Administrative divisions of India
- West Coast of India
