= Maratha Warriors (disambiguation) =

The Maratha Warriors was a club in the defunct Premier Hockey League.

Maratha Warriors may also refer to:

- Maratha Warriors, a club in the Indian Volley League
- Warriors of the Maratha Empire

== See also ==
- Maratha (disambiguation)
