= Maharashtri language =

Maharashtri language may refer to:

- Maharashtri Prakrit, a Prakrit language (Middle Indo-Aryan) once spoken in the Indian state of Maharashtra
- Marathi language, the predominant modern Indo-Aryan language of Maharashtra

== See also ==
- Maharashtrian (disambiguation)
