= Pandit =

Scholar or teacher of Hindu law, philosophy or music

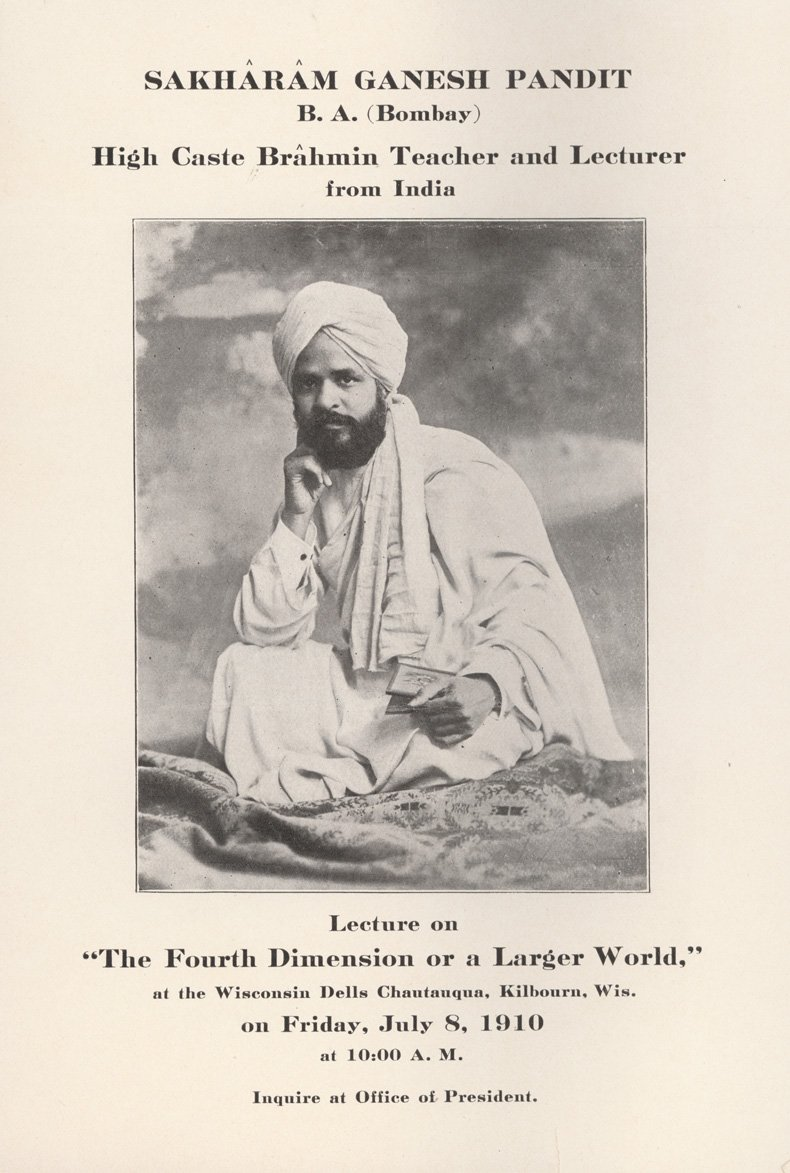
A flyer advertising Sakharam Ganesh Pandit in Kilbourn, Wisconsin c.1910

A pandit (Sanskrit: पण्डितः, romanized: paṇḍitaḥ; Hindi: पंडित, romanized: paṇḍit; also spelled pundit, pronounced /ˈpʌndɪt, ˈpændɪt/; abbreviated Pt. or Pdt.) is an individual with specialised knowledge or a teacher of any field of knowledge in Sanskrit or Hinduism, particularly the Vedic scriptures, dharma, or Hindu philosophy; in colonial-era literature, the term generally refers to lawyers specialized in Hindu law. Whereas, today the title is used for experts in other subjects, such as music. Pandit entered English as the loanword pundit, referring to a person who offers opinion in an authoritative manner on a particular subject area (typically politics, the social sciences, technology or sport), usually through the mass media. The equivalent titles for a Hindu woman are vidushi, pandita, or panditain; however, these titles are not currently in widespread use.

In Sanskrit, pandit generally refers to any "wise, educated or learned man" with specialized knowledge. The term is derived from paṇḍ (पण्ड्) which means "to collect, heap, pile up", and this root is used in the sense of knowledge. The term is found in Vedic and post-Vedic texts, but without any sociological context. The female form is paṇḍitā, and the most famous named female example is Pandita Ramabai.

== Pandit as a title in Hindustani classical music ==
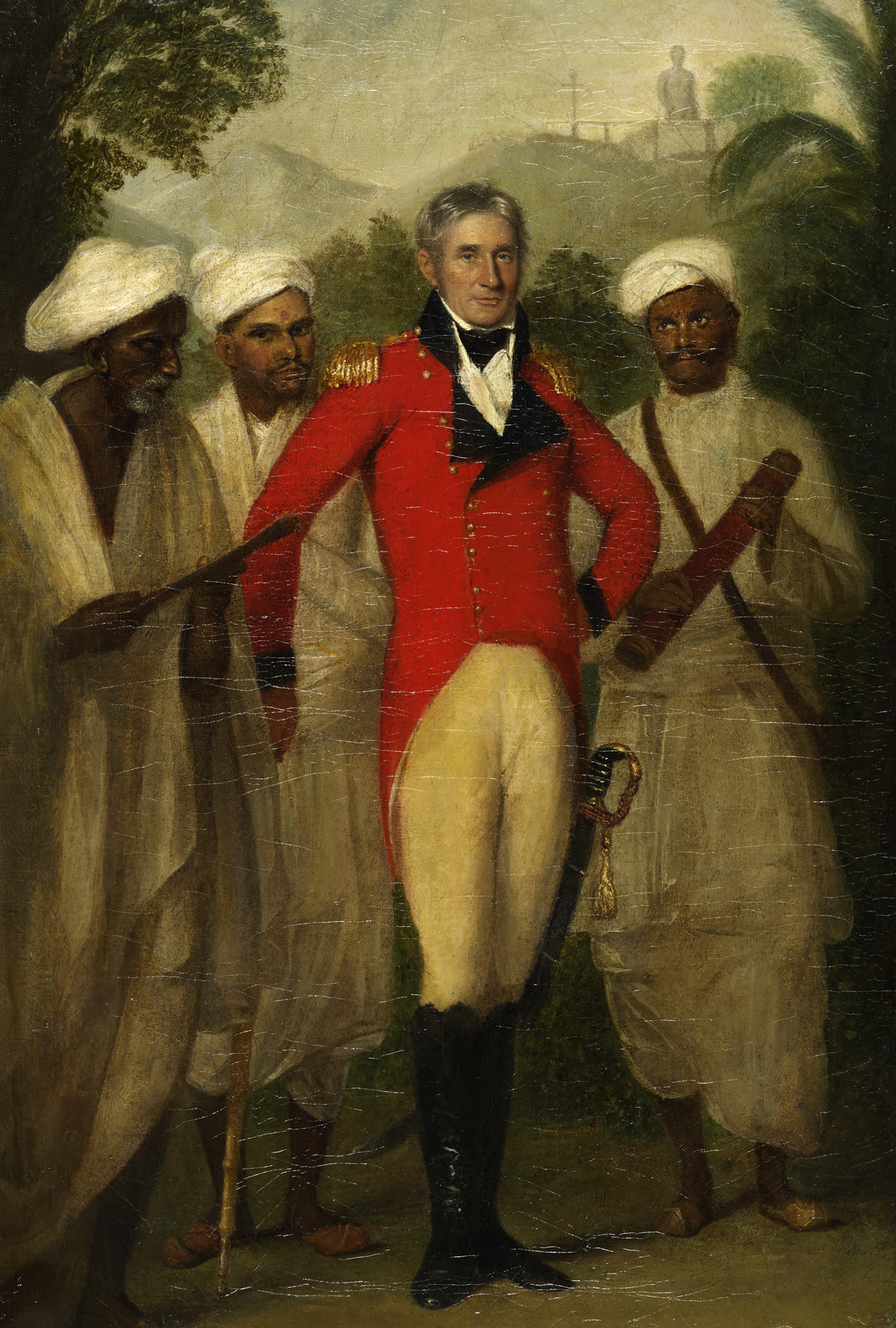
1816 painting of Colin Mackenzie and three pandits

Pandit (abbreviated as Pt. and written as पंडित in Marathi/Hindi) is an honorific title for an expert person in Indian classical singing and instrumental playing, used for an Indian musician. It is used in Hindustani classical music to recognize master performers for classical singing and other performing arts, like classical dance. It is used as a music title. The title is awarded to musicians by their teachers, prominent individuals, or members of their gharana in recognition of their expertise. It is used in various languages including Kannada, Marathi, Hindi, Bengali, Punjabi and other languages which are there in India. An Indian woman, who is an expert in Indian classical music, is given the title of pandita or vidushi. Ustad is the equivalent title for a Muslim man.

=== Usage ===
Titles of pandit (and even ustad) are appended informally to the names of classical singers and players by their admirers, individuals or institutions, once they have reached eminence in their performing art, especially on public performances. As they are informal titles, mentioning names of eminent singers without those appendages is acceptable, unlike prefixes like Dr. awarded formally by educational institutions.

The title pandit of a classical musician and the pandit which is used as a title given to a knowledgeable person, are different.

=== Synonym ===
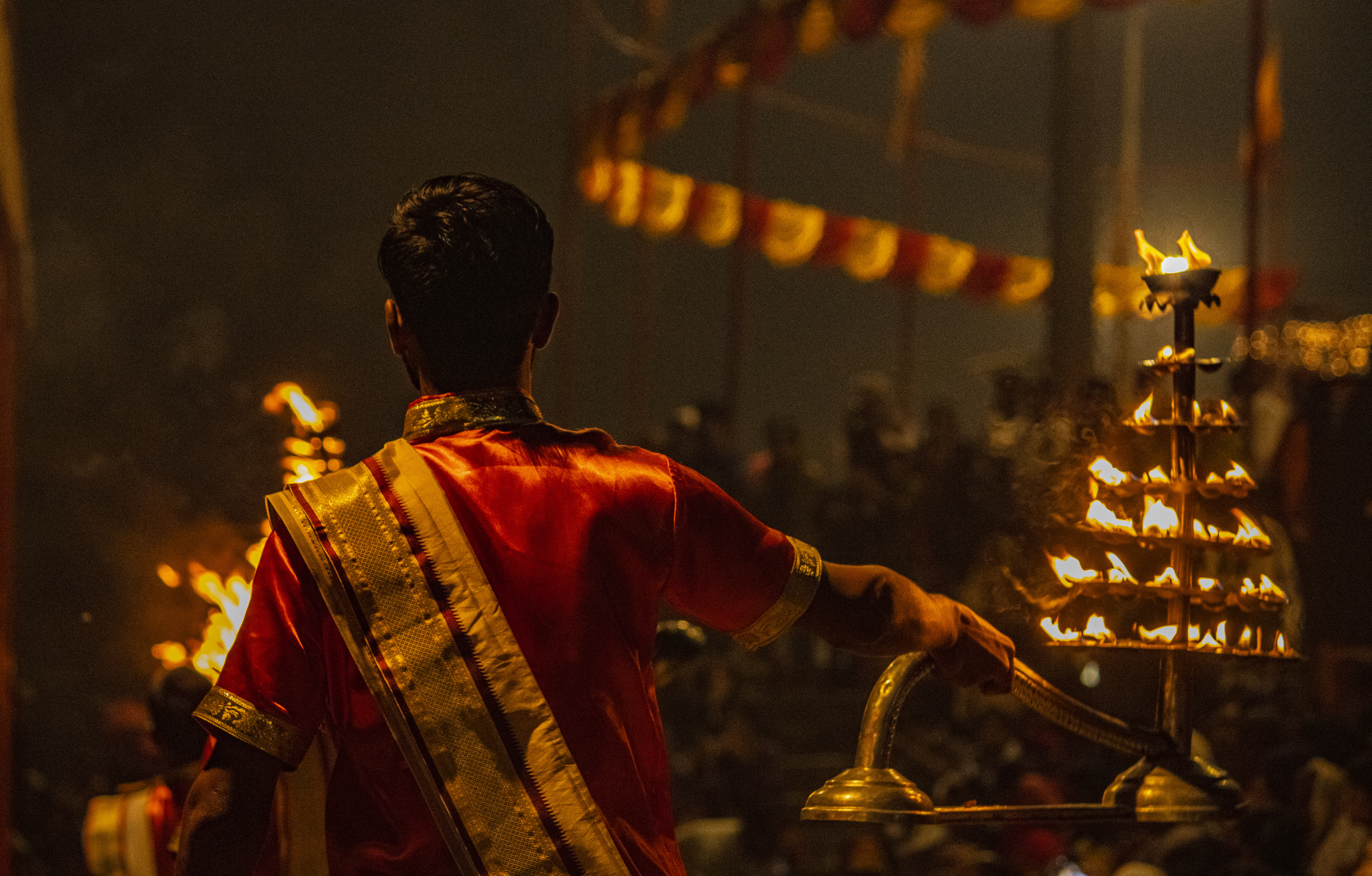
A young pandit holding the lamp of fire

As ustad is equivalent to pandit but used for a Muslim man, similarly a music title that is equivalent to pandit and used for an Indian man itself is given the title of vidwan. Generally this title is given to a male Carnatic classical singer or instrument player. One prominent example is Vidwan Thetakudi Harihara Vinayakram.

For a female Carnatic classical singer or musician, the title of Vidushi is given.

Equivalent titles for women are Vidushi or Pandita (Sanskrit: पण्डिता, romanized: paṇḍitā; Hindi: पंडित).

== Kashmiri and Maharashtrian surname ==
The Kashmiri Pandits are a Hindu clan from the Kashmir Valley in Jammu and Kashmir. Pandit as a last name is used by Kashmiri Hindus, Kashmiri Muslims of Hindu lineage and Maharashtrian (Marathi) Hindus.

== See also ==
- Jagannatha Panditaraja
- Pandit Jawaharlal Nehru
- Pandita Ramabai
- Pujari
- Purohit – a house priest
- Ustad
