= Marathi =

Marathi may refer to:

- Marathi people, an Indo-Aryan ethnolinguistic group of Maharashtra, India
- Marathi language, the Indo-Aryan language spoken by the Marathi people
- Palaiosouda, also known as Marathi, a small island in Greece

== See also ==
- Balbodh, the script used to write the Marathi language
- Maharashtrian cuisine
- Maratha (disambiguation)
- Maharashtrian (disambiguation)
