= Anglo-Maratha Wars =

Anglo-Maratha Wars may refer to:

- First Anglo-Maratha War (1775–1782)
- Second Anglo-Maratha War (1803–1805)
- Third Anglo-Maratha War (1817–1819)
- Gwalior campaign (1843)

== See also ==
- Description of the armed forces of the opposing sides:
  - History of the British Army
  - History of the Royal Navy (after 1707)
  - Maratha army
  - Maratha Navy
- Maratha (disambiguation)
- Mahratta (disambiguation)
- Mahratta War (disambiguation)
