= Taxation in medieval India =

This page examines the forms of taxation levied in India during the Middle Ages.

== Ghari ==
Ghari was a tax on houses. It was introduced by Allauddin Khilji.

== Charah ==
Charah was a tax on grasslands used for grazing of animals. It was also introduced by Allauddin Khilji.

== Khiraj ==
Khiraj was a tax levied on the gross product of lands belonging to non-Muslims. It was introduced by Firoz Shah Tughlaq.

== Ushraf ==
Ushraf was a tax levied on the gross product of lands belonging to Muslims.

== Zakat/Sadka ==
Zakat was a religious tax levied on Muslims. It was kept in the special treasury of Diwan-i-Rasalat headed by kabir-i-Mulk.

== Jizya ==
Jizya was a tax levied on non-Muslims and non-followers of Islam.

== Khums ==
" it is related to war booty collected by one army from its opponent. for example - if an army got 100 rupees from the opponent, it would keep say 80 with itself and would donate the rest in the treasury."

== Sharab or Sharb ==
Sharab or Sharb was 1/10 of crop production levied on farmers to develop and maintain water supply facilities. It was introduced by Firuz Tughlaq.

== Vijayanagara Empire ==
In the Vijayanagara Empire, the government department responsible collecting the land revenue was called Athanave. The Vijayanagara emperors collected the taxes based on the soil fertility of lands. Tax on production was 1/6 of the gross product. It was paid either in the form of crops or money. Heavy taxes were levied on prostitution.

Turkic sultans followed the Hanafi School of Islamic jurisprudence as their monetary policy. The costs were very low in the time of Ibrahim Lodhi. In the Vijayanagar Empire the cost of goods was also low.

== Zarib ==
Zarib was introduced by Murshid Quli Khan based on the unit bigha. It was collected as one quarter of the crop production. It was paid in any form.

== Chauth and Sardeshmukhi ==
Shivaji collected these taxes outside of his territory. Chauth... was 1/4 of the government revenue paid by Mughal officers. In addition to this, the sardeshmuki was another 10% percent tax.

== See also ==
- Taxation in India
