= Taxation in India =

Taxes in India are levied by the central and state governments under powers conferred by the Constitution of India; local bodies such as municipalities and panchayats may levy some minor taxes, mainly property tax. Article 265 of the Constitution provides that "No tax shall be levied or collected except by the authority of law". So, the Parliament or a State Legislature must have a law in force to collect taxes.

The main central taxes are income tax on individuals and companies, governed since 1 April 2026 by the Income-Tax Act, 2025, and customs duty. The Goods and Services Tax (GST), introduced in 2017, is levied jointly by the central and state governments. The Constitution of India outlines the taxation powers of the centre and the states. In 2025-26, the central government collected ₹2,340,406 crore (US$240 billion) in net direct taxes, according to provisional data released by the Central Board of Direct Taxes. Combined central and state tax revenue is 19.6% of GDP.

The system has been criticised for its complexity, frequent amendments, high litigation volume, retrospective taxation, and high tariffs; successive governments have tried to simplify laws and enact administrative reforms while combating evasion.

== History ==
Income tax was first introduced in India in 1860 by James Wilson to meet the costs of suppressing the 1857 rebellion. India has abolished several taxes over time, including inheritance tax, interest tax, gift tax, and wealth tax. The government also imposed new taxes, such as the Securities Transaction Tax. Direct taxes were governed by the Income-tax Act, 1961 and the Wealth Tax Act, 1957, the latter was repealed in 2015. The 1961 act was replaced by the Income-tax Act, 2025 and came into force on 1 April 2026. The government proposed a new legislation, the Indian Financial Code, in 2015. However, the government backed out of it due to the controversy surrounding the code regarding dilution of Reserve Bank of India's power. Retrospective taxation of indirect transfers of assets in India, introduced in 2012, was withdrawn in 2021.

== Constitutionally established scheme of taxation ==
Article 246 of the Indian Constitution, distributes legislative powers including taxation, between the Parliament of India and the State Legislature. Schedule VII enumerates these subject matters with the use of three lists:

- List – I entailing the areas on which only the parliament is competent to make laws,
- List – II entailing the areas on which only the state legislature can make laws, and
- List – III listing the areas on which both the Parliament and the State Legislature can make laws upon concurrently.

Separate heads of taxation are no head of taxation in the Concurrent List (Union and the States have no concurrent power of taxation). The list of thirteen Union heads of taxation and the list of nineteen State heads are given below:

=== Central government of India ===
SL. No.	Taxes as per Union List
82	Income tax: Taxes on income other than agricultural income.
83	Custom Duty: Duties of customs including export duties
84	Excise Duty: Duties of excise on the following goods manufactured or produced in India namely (a)Petroleum crude (b)high speed diesel (c)motor spirit (commonly known as petrol) (d)natural gas (e) aviation turbine fuel and (f)Tobacco and tobacco products
85	Corporation Tax
86	Taxes on capital value of assets, exclusive of agricultural land, of individuals and companies, taxes on capital of companies
87	Estate duty in respect of property other than agricultural land
88	Duties in respect of succession to property other than agricultural land
89	Terminal taxes on goods or passengers, carried by railway, sea or air; taxes on railway fares and freight.
90	Taxes other than stamp duties on transactions in stock exchanges and futures markets
92A	Taxes on sale or purchase of goods other than newspapers, where such sale or purchase takes place in the course of inter-State trade or commerce
92B	Taxes on the consignment of goods in the course of inter-State trade or commerce
97	All residuary types of taxes not listed in any of the three lists of Seventh Schedule of Indian Constitution

=== State governments ===
SL. No.	Taxes as per State List
45	Land revenue, including the assessment and collection of revenue, the maintenance of land records, survey for revenue purposes and records of rights, and alienation of revenues etc.
46	Taxes on agricultural income
47	Duties in respect of succession to agricultural land.
48	Estate Duty in respect of agricultural land
49	Taxes on lands and buildings.
50	Taxes on mineral rights.
51	Duties of excise for following goods manufactured or produced within the State (i) alcoholic liquors for human consumption, and (ii) opium, Indian hemp and other narcotic drugs and narcotics.
53	Electricity Duty:Taxes on the consumption or sale of electricity
54	Taxes on sale of petroleum crude, high speed diesel, motor spirit (commonly known as petrol), Natural gas aviation turbine fuel and alcohol liquor for human consumption but not including sale in the course of inter state or commerce or sale in the source of international trade or commerce such goods.
56	Taxes on goods and passengers carried by roads or on inland waterways.
57	Taxes on vehicles suitable for use on roads.
58	Taxes on animals and boats.
59	Tolls.
60	Taxes on profession, trades, callings and employments.
61	Capitation taxes.
62	Taxes on entertainment and amusements to be extent levied and collected by a panchayat or Municipality or a regional council or a district council.
63	Stamp duty

== Income tax ==
Income Tax is a tax imposed on individuals or entities (taxpayers) that varies with respective income or profits (taxable income). Income tax generally is computed as the product of a tax rate times taxable income. However, for individuals, tax is payable at slab rates. In the Finance Act, 2020 the Government introduced a new tax regime for individuals giving them the option to opt for the new regime or continue with the old regime.

The tax is collected by the Income Tax Department for the central government. Farmers – who constitute 70% of the Indian workforce – are generally excluded from paying income tax in India.

Income tax returns are due in India generally on 31 July, 30 September or 30 November, depending on the category of taxpayer. Everyone who earns or gets an income in India is subject to income tax. Income is divided into five categories: Income from Salary, Income from Other Sources, Income from House Property, Income from Capital Gains, and Income from Business and Profession.

== Corporate tax ==
India taxes corporate income under the Income-tax Act, 2025, which has been in force since 1 April 2026. Since 2019, domestic companies have an option to pay a "minimum alternate tax" (MAT). Resident Indian companies are taxed on their worldwide income, and foreign companies are taxed only on income generated in India. The basic tax rate for foreign companies is 10% higher (35% compared to 25%), and could be more depending on the amount of profits and applicable cesses.

The government presented the 2019 cuts as making India an investment-friendly destination, with rates below China and most of southeast Asia. Until 2020, the government imposed a dividend distribution tax, which was abolished in 2020. Dividends are now taxed at the hands of recipients as per applicable slab rate.

== Goods and services tax ==
Goods and Services Tax is an indirect tax collected on supply of goods or service.

- Central Goods and Services Tax (CGST): Portion of Tax to central government on intrastate sales.
- State Goods and Services Tax (SGST): Portion of Tax to state on intrastate sales.
- Integrated Goods and Services Tax (IGST): tax for interstate sales.

Goods and services are divided into five different tax slabs for collection of tax – 0%, 5%, 12%, 18% and 28%. However, petroleum products, alcoholic drinks, and electricity are not taxed under GST and instead are taxed separately by the individual state governments, as per the previous tax system.

== Custom duty ==
Customs duty is a tax on import & export of goods in India with specific rates on certain types of goods. Customs authorities are rightful in checking accurate details of the items exported or imported along with the origin of the item and duly validated rates & structure. Custom duty measures the value of the items in the context of the tax applicable on such item and is much higher on certain types of items including sin goods i.e. liquor & imported cigars.

Custom duty is an indirect tax levied on import or export of goods in and out of country. When goods are imported from outside, the tax known as import custom duty. when goods are exported outside India, the tax is known as export custom duty. The tax collected by Central Board of Indirect Taxes and Customs. In February 2020, as part of India's attempts to increase and support local production, the government stated that it raised taxes on imports for items such as electronic devices, furniture and toys.

== Service tax ==
The Service tax was imposed by the government on all the services provided by firms and servicing companies in lieu of monetary benefit. The service tax levied on services is actually borne by the customers which in turn goes through multiple channels of levying authorities till back to the government. Service tax will be applicable on the taxable services only which is provided or will be provided by the service provider agreeing upon the concern of actually offering services.

It is a tax levied on services provided in India. The responsibility of collecting the tax lies with the Central Board of Excise and Customs (CBEC). From 2012, service tax is imposed on all services, except those which are specifically exempted under law(e.g. Exempt under Negative List, Exempt as exclusion from Service definition as per Service Tax, Exempt under MEN(Mega exemption notification)). In budget presented for 2008–2009, it was announced that all small service providers whose turnover does not exceed ₹1 million (US$10,000) need not pay service tax. Service tax at a rate of 14 per cent(Inclusive of EC & SHEC) will be imposed on all applicable services from 1 June 2015. From 15 November 2015, Swacch Bharat cess of 0.5% has been added to all taxable service leading the new Service Tax rate to be 14.5 per cent (Inclusive of EC, SHEC & Swacch Bharat cess). On 29 February 2016, Current Finance Minister Mr. Arun Jaitley announces a new Cess, Krishi Kalyan Cess that would be levied from 1 June 2016 at the rate of 0.5% on all taxable services. The purpose of introducing Krishi Kalyan Cess is to improve agriculture activities and welfare of Indian farmers. Thus, the new Service Tax rate would be 15% incorporating EC, SHEC, Swachh Bharat Cess and Krishi Kalyan Cess.

From 2015 to currently, the gross tax collection of the centre from service tax has amounted in excess of ₹2.10 trillion (US$22 billion).

Service tax has been replaced by Goods and Services Tax in India. Service tax no longer applies to services in India.

=== Central excise ===
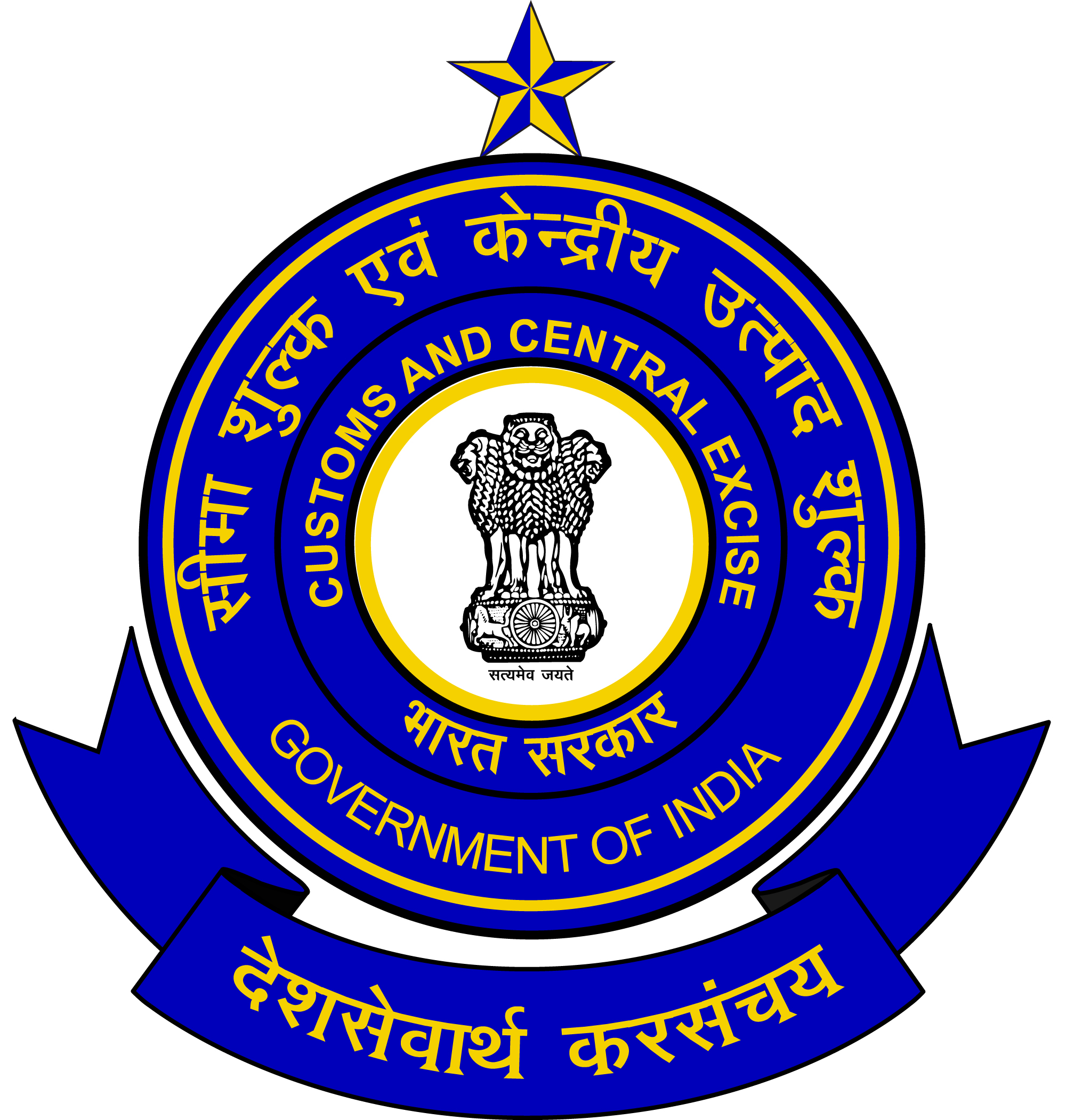
Logo of Customs and Central Excise

In 2015–2016, the gross tax collection of the centre from excise amounted to ₹2.80 trillion (US$29 billion).

1. Central Excise Act, 1944, which imposes a duty of excise on goods manufactured or produced in India;
2. Central Sales Tax, 1956, which imposes sales tax on goods sold in inter-state trade or commerce in Indisale of property situated within the state

In the 2016 Union budget of India, an excise of duty of 1% without input tax credit and 12.5% with input tax credit was imposed on articles of jewellery with the exception of silver jewellery. The government had earlier proposed an excise duty in the Budget 2011–12, which had to be rolled back after massive protests by jewellers.

- Central Excise Tariff Act, 1985
- Central Excise Valuation (Determination of Price of Excisable Goods) Rules, 2000

== Local body taxes ==
"Local body tax", popularly known by its abbreviation as "LBT", is the tax imposed by the local civic bodies of India on the entry of goods into a local area for consumption, use or sale therein. The tax is imposed based on the Entry 52 of the State List from the Schedule VII of the Constitution of India which reads; "Taxes on the entry of goods into a local area for consumption, use or sale therein." The tax is to be paid by the trader to the civic bodies and the rules and regulations of these vary amongst different States in India. The LBT is now partially abolished as of 1 August 2015.

=== Property tax ===
Property tax, or 'house tax,' is a local tax on buildings, along with appurtenant land, and imposed on Possessor (certainly, not true custodian of property as per 1978, 44th amendment of constitution). It resembles the US-type wealth tax and differs from the excise-type UK rate. The tax power is vested in the states and it is delegated by law to the local bodies, specifying the valuation method, rate band, and collection procedures. The tax base is the annual rental value (ARV) or area-based rating. Owner-occupied and other properties not producing rent are assessed on cost and then converted into ARV by applying a percentage of cost, usually six per cent. Vacant land is generally exempt. Central government properties are exempt. Instead a 'service charge' is permissible under executive order. Properties of foreign missions also enjoy tax exemption without an insistence for reciprocity. The tax is usually accompanied by a number of service taxes, e.g., water tax, drainage tax, conservancy (sanitation) tax, lighting tax, all using the same tax base. The rate structure is flat on rural (panchayat) properties, but in the urban (municipal) areas it is mildly progressive with about 80% of assessments falling in the first two slabs.

== Tax evasion ==
The Indian government's deficiency in governmental expenditures is most notably attributed to wide spread tax evasion. Relative to other developing countries, the fact that India's income tax comprises 5% of its GDP is due to the fact nearly 2–3% of the population is exposed to income taxation. India faces more difficulties in proliferating its income tax than a country like China, who subjects 20% of its population, because there is an emphatically low amount of formal wage earners. Even though India's income tax was instituted in 1922 by the British, their tax history explains their high degree of tax delinquency today. With effect from 1 April 2017, the Income-tax Act, 1961 has introduced the General Anti-avoidance Rules. The intent of the bringing the said rules is to curb the ill-practices of the tax payers & tax practitioners assisting the tax payers in avoiding the tax where the tax impact of the arrangement or the transactions is more than INR Three Crores in a particular Financial Year. GAAR intends to cover the cases where the main purpose of the transaction is to obtain the tax benefit. It is pertinent to note that recently due to BEPS project by OECD & G 20 Member nations, there was huge hue and cry by the Inclusive Framework countries, where every country was trying to protect their respective tax base. Accordingly, basis the Action Plan Report 6 of the BEPS Project, member nations were required to adopt PPT test as a minimum standard. The said standard re-enshrines that where " one of the principal purposes of the transaction is to obtain tax benefit" then treaty benefit will not be allowed. Thus, presently in Indian context most of the treaties entered into by India, includes such minimum standard, accordingly where one of the principal purposes of the transaction is to obtain tax benefit, treaty benefit will be denied. This has posed several difficulties for MNCs who have routed their investments through Island Countries in India such as Mauritius, which though has a very good- Double tax avoidance treaty with India but with PPT all the benefits could be questioned due to want of Substance & PPT test requirements. The same was considered recently by Authority for Advance Rulings, New Delhi in ruling for Tiger Global International II Holdings,

=== History and methods ===
In the beginning of the income tax operation, the rates of taxes were comparatively low to levels today, and thus, so were levels of evasion. However, World War Two catalysed a set of conditions that inspired mass tax evasion. As many supplies were cut off and shortages were rampant, the prices of commodities and the level of taxes imposed by the government augmented. This ultimately generated black markets, and stimulated a nationwide sentiment of tax evasion. Consequently, as the government tried to combat this extensive issue, the government continued to impose extortionate levels of taxation, only exacerbating the normalcy of tax evasion. Today, opportunities for tax evasion are comprehensive amongst self-employed individuals, as they have more opportunities to lie about the origination of their income. For instance, many individuals exaggerate or lie about their wealth deriving from agriculture, because agricultural income is excluded from the purview of the central income tax. In addition, many individuals divert their incomes to spouses and children, or even create fictitious partnerships, to evade taxation. The general consensus asserts the following to be chiefly responsible for increasing tax evasion and generation of black money in India:

- Complicated tax structure
- Frequent amendments
- Shortage of personnel
- High tax rates
- Non-levy of deterrent penalties
- Ineffective prosecution machinery
- Operation of ill- thought-out controls
- Price fixation without proper regulation of production and distribution
- Evasion of sales tax
- Excise duty

Additionally, enormous amounts of black income and tax evasion are fuelled by bribery and corruption. In India, corrupt businessmen sponsor political parties with black money, in order to augment their wealth reduce their taxation. Inherently then, the lack of revenue for governmental expenditures is partly created by the government themselves. While individuals blame the government for difficulties and shortages, many do not understand the importance of taking accountability and paying one's taxes.

=== Effects of mass tax evasion ===
The exorbitant levels of tax evasion has inspired the creation of a black money parallel economy. Black money inherently causes inflation and hinders the government's ability to bring down the prices of commodities. In fact, the large volume of black money actually diverts governmental resources from national welfare and encourages the continuation of illegal activity. Unfortunately, it is the honest individuals who are in the salaried class who feel the negative externalities of this situation. Besides depriving the state's exchequer and understating India's GDP, extensive tax evasion has encouraged the payment of huge dowries at the time of marriages. This ultimately makes it difficult for low and middle class individuals to marry off their children, adding a social detriment to this widespread economic problem. More than anything though, the normalcy of tax evasion has understated positive societal values like honesty and hard work.

=== Governmental attempts to combat tax evasion ===
The Indian government has taken several steps in order to mitigate the effects and degree of tax evasion. Amongst actual legislations, Searches, seizures, surveys, and scrutiny of income tax returns are being done by the Income Tax Department. The government has also created Voluntary Disclosure of Income Schemes, whereby black income and assets can actually be declared without penalty or prosecution. In addition, the introduction of the Prevention of Money‐Laundering Act makes any and all activities related to the laundering of money a federal offence with a minimum imprisonment of less than three years. Similarly, the Finance Act of 2004 prosecutes for the falsification of books and taxing gifts worth more than 25,000 Rupees. Given that tax evasion is one of the most wide spread, yet difficult issues a government can deal with, they have historically relegated this issue to recommendations made by Taxation Enquiry Commission (1953), Administrative Reforms Commission (1969), and Direct Tax Enquiry Committee (1971). Additionally, India has attempted to eradicate tax evasion by requiring an identification number for all major financial deals. However, this method has proven very ineffective, as many transactions are conducted with cash and therefore often go unreported.

== See also ==
- History of the British salt tax in India
- Indian tax forms
- Investigation Division of the Central Board of Direct Taxes
- Directorate of Revenue Intelligence
- States of India by tax revenues
- Taxation in medieval India
- Union budget of India
- Value-added taxation in India
- Chairperson, Central Board of Direct Taxes
- Chairperson, Central Board of Indirect Taxes and Customs
- Energy law#India
