= Mahratta War =

Mahratta War may refer to:

- First Anglo-Maratha War (1775–1802)
- Second Anglo-Maratha War (1803–1805)
- Third Anglo-Maratha War (1817–1818)

== See also ==
- Mahratta (disambiguation)
- Maratha (disambiguation)
- Anglo-Maratha Wars (disambiguation)
