= List of states and union territories of India by tax revenues =

In India states earn revenue through own taxes, central taxes, non-taxes and central grants. For most states, own taxes form the largest part of the total state revenue. Taxes as per the state list includes land revenue, taxes on agricultural income, electricity duty, luxury tax, entertainment tax and stamp duty.

== Data ==
The following list has been compiled from Reserve Bank of India's "Handbook of Statistics on Indian States".

(in ₹ crores)

State-wise Own Tax Revenue (in ₹ Billion)
States	1990–91	1991–92	1992–93	1993–94	1994–95	1995–96	1996–97	1997–98	1998–99	1999-00	2000–01	2001–02	2002–03	2003–04	2004–05	2005–06	2006–07	2007–08	2008–09	2009–10	2010–11	2011–12	2012–13	2013–14	2014–15	2015–16	2016–17	2017–18 (RE)	2018–19 (BE)
I. Non-Special Category																													
Andhra Pradesh	26.5	30.6	33.9	38.3	42.3	41.2	48.8	71.1	79.6	90.1	105.5	125.6	126.2	138.1	162.5	192.1	239.3	287.9	333.6	351.8	451.4	532.8	598.8	641.2	426.2	399.1	441.8	527.2	655.3
Bihar	11.4	13.1	15.6	17.5	18.4	19.7	22.5	23.9	26.7	36.4	29.4	24.4	27.6	33.6	33.4	35.6	40.3	50.9	61.7	80.9	98.7	126.1	162.5	199.6	207.5	254.5	237.4	320	310
Chhattisgarh	–	–	–	–	–	–	–	–	–	–	7.5	19.9	23.3	25.9	32.3	40.5	50.5	56.2	65.9	71.2	90.1	107.1	130.3	143.4	157.1	170.7	189.5	202	188.9
Goa	0.9	1.1	1.4	1.9	2.3	2.7	3	3.7	3.6	4.6	5.2	5.7	6	7.1	8.6	11	12.9	13.6	16.9	17.6	21.4	25.5	29.4	35.8	39	39.8	42.6	48.5	52.8
Gujarat	24	28.9	34.6	39.4	47.4	53.2	60.7	65.9	76.2	81.6	90.5	92.5	95.2	111.7	129.6	157	184.7	218.9	235.6	267.4	363.4	442.5	539	563.7	613.4	626.5	644.4	779.7	887.3
Haryana	10.7	13	14.5	15.9	18.9	21.7	21.4	23.7	31.2	35.2	43.1	49.7	55.5	63.5	74.4	90.8	109.3	116.2	116.6	132.2	167.9	204	235.6	255.7	276.3	309.3	340.3	446.9	491.3
Jharkhand	–	–	–	–	–	–	–	–	–	–	–	20.8	22.8	22.8	24	28.9	31.3	35.5	50.8	55.6	59.7	69.5	82.2	93.8	103.5	114.8	133	184	192.5
Karnataka	23.3	29	31	38.1	42.9	52.7	57.7	64.1	69.4	77.4	90.4	98.5	104.4	125.7	160.7	186.3	233	259.9	276.5	305.8	384.7	464.8	537.5	626	701.8	755.5	829.6	855.9	958.2
Kerala	13.4	16.7	18.9	23.4	28	33.8	39	45	46.5	51.9	58.7	59.2	73	80.9	89.6	97.8	119.4	136.7	159.9	176.3	217.2	257.2	300.8	320	352.3	390	421.8	488.2	585.9
Madhya Pradesh	17.5	21.2	23.3	26.8	28.7	35.2	41	45.6	51.1	58	56.4	47	61.7	67.9	77.7	91.2	104.7	120.2	136.1	172.7	214.2	269.7	305.8	335.5	365.7	402.1	441.9	463.4	546.6
Maharashtra	51.2	59.5	65.6	77	94.5	109.3	117.2	137.2	142	172.7	197.2	212.9	228.1	251.6	306.1	335.4	401	475.3	520.3	591.1	750.3	876.1	1034.5	1086	1150.6	1266.1	1365.9	1649.8	1880.4
Odisha	6.7	6.7	7.6	8.6	9.2	11.3	13.4	14.2	14.9	17	21.8	24.7	28.7	33	41.8	50	60.7	68.6	80	89.8	111.9	134.4	150.3	168.9	198.3	225.3	228.5	265.2	285.5
Punjab	12.9	15.4	17.6	21.5	26	26.5	27.4	30.4	32.6	39.5	49	48.2	57.1	61.5	69.5	89.9	90.2	99	111.5	120.4	168.3	188.4	225.9	240.8	255.7	266.9	277.5	354.9	425.6
Rajasthan	12.2	15.5	17.3	19.5	23.1	27.3	31.2	36.1	39.4	45.3	53	56.7	62.5	72.5	84.2	98.8	116.1	132.8	149.4	164.1	207.6	253.8	305	334.8	386.7	427.1	443.7	518.2	581
Tamil Nadu	31.2	37.3	41.6	48	58.3	71.5	79.8	86.9	96.3	109.2	122.8	130.1	143.4	159.4	193.6	233.3	277.7	296.2	336.8	365.5	477.8	595.2	712.5	737.2	786.6	804.8	859.4	912.8	999.3
Telangana	–	–	–	–	–	–	–	–	–	–	–	–	–	–	–	–	–	–	–	–	–	–	–	0	292.9	399.7	484.1	613.7	737.5
Uttar Pradesh	31.6	35	38.9	41.3	48.8	54.7	63.1	70	79.1	94	109.8	103.3	127.7	136	156.9	188.6	230	249.6	286.6	338.8	413.5	526.1	581	665.8	741.7	811.1	859.7	949.6	1227
West Bengal	21.3	24.5	26.1	29.1	37.3	41.3	42.6	45.2	47.8	51	59.2	65.1	70.5	87.7	99.2	103.9	117	131.3	144.2	169	211.3	249.4	328.1	358.3	394.1	424.9	454.7	454.8	452.3
II. Special Category																													
Arunachal Pradesh	0	0	0	0	0.1	0.1	0.1	0.1	0.1	0.1	0.2	0.3	0.4	0.4	0.5	0.6	0.8	1	1.4	1.7	2.1	3.2	3.2	4.3	4.6	5.4	7.1	7.5	9.3
Assam	4.2	5.1	5.2	6.1	6.3	7	7.7	8.8	9.8	12.3	14.1	15.7	19.4	20.7	27.1	32.3	34.8	33.6	41.5	49.9	59.3	76.4	82.5	89.9	94.5	101.1	120.8	97.7	116.4
Himachal Pradesh	1.6	1.9	2.2	2.6	3	3.4	4.1	4.8	5.7	6.2	7.3	9.2	8.9	9.8	12.5	15	16.6	19.6	22.4	25.7	36.4	41.1	46.3	51.2	59.4	67	70.4	73.8	82.5
Jammu and Kashmir	1.6	1.6	2.1	2.3	2.4	2.9	2.9	3.7	4.4	5.8	7.5	8.6	9.8	11.5	14	16.9	19	23	26.9	30.7	34.8	47.5	58.3	62.7	63.3	73.3	78.2	101.4	111.9
Manipur	0.2	0.1	0.2	0.2	0.2	0.3	0.1	0.4	0.3	0.4	0.5	0.5	0.7	0.7	0.8	0.9	1.2	1.5	1.7	2	2.7	3.7	3.3	4.7	5.2	5.5	5.9	6.4	7.6
Meghalaya	0.4	0.4	0.4	0.5	0.6	0.7	0.8	0.7	0.9	1	1.2	1.4	1.5	1.8	2.1	2.5	3	3.2	3.7	4.4	5.7	7	8.5	9.5	9.4	10.6	11.9	15.6	17.2
Mizoram	0	0	0.1	0.1	0.1	0.1	0.1	0.1	0.1	0.1	0.1	0.2	0.3	0.3	0.4	0.6	0.7	0.8	0.9	1.1	1.3	1.8	2.2	2.3	2.7	3.6	4.4	4.8	4.8
Nagaland	0.2	0.2	0.2	0.2	0.2	0.2	0.3	0.3	0.4	0.4	0.6	0.5	0.6	0.7	0.8	1.1	1.2	1.3	1.6	1.8	2.3	3	3.4	3.3	3.9	4.3	5.1	5.7	6.4
Sikkim	0.1	0.1	0.1	0.1	0.1	0.2	0.2	0.3	0.3	0.3	0.7	0.8	1.1	1.1	1.2	1.5	1.7	2	1.8	2.2	2.8	2.9	4.4	5.2	5.3	5.7	6.5	7	7.7
Tripura	0.3	0.3	0.3	0.4	0.4	0.5	0.6	0.7	0.8	1	1.3	1.6	1.8	2.2	2.4	3	3.4	3.7	4.4	5.3	6.2	8.6	10	10.7	11.7	13.3	14.2	14.7	17.1
Uttarakhand	–	–	–	–	–	–	–	–	–	–	3	8.9	10.2	12.3	14.4	17.9	25.1	27.4	30.4	35.6	44.1	56.2	64.1	73.6	83.4	93.8	109	134.5	149.6
All-States	303.5	357.6	398.7	458.7	539.5	617.5	685.7	782.9	859.1	991.5	1135.8	1232	1368.2	1540.4	1820.3	2123.1	2525.5	2865.5	3219.3	3630.6	4607.1	5574	6545.5	7124.2	7792.8	8471.4	9129.1	10503.5	11988
Memo item:																													
NCT Delhi	–	–	–	5.5	17.9	21.1	25.3	29.4	30.9	34.3	44	49	53.2	58.8	71.1	89.4	101.6	117.8	121.8	134.5	164.8	199.7	234.3	259.2	266	302.3	311.4	366	420
Puducherry	–	–	–	–	–	–	–	–	–	–	–	–	–	–						8.7	15	15.9	19.2	19	19.9	22.6	24	27.2	27.5

No.	State/UT	2016–17	2017–18 (RE) (Note: Revised estimate)	Change in annual collection between 2009–10 and 2017–18 (RE) (Note: Revised estimate)
	All-states	9129.1	10503.5	▲6872.9
Non-Special Category
1	Andhra Pradesh	441.8	527.2	▲175.4
2	Bihar	237.4	320	▲239.1
3	Chhattisgarh	189.5	202	▲130.8
4	Goa	42.6	48.5	▲30.9
5	Gujarat	644.4	779.7	▲512.3
6	Haryana	340.3	446.9	▲314.7
7	Jharkhand	133	184	▲128.4
8	Karnataka	829.6	855.9	▲550.1
9	Kerala	421.8	488.2	▲311.9
10	Madhya Pradesh	441.9	463.4	▲290.7
11	Maharashtra	1365.9	1649.8	▲1058.7
12	Odisha	228.5	265.2	▲175.4
13	Punjab	277.5	354.9	▲234.5
14	Rajasthan	443.7	518.2	▲354.1
15	Tamil Nadu	859.4	912.8	▲547.3
16	Telangana	484.1	613.7	
17	Uttar Pradesh	859.7	949.6	▲610.8
18	West Bengal	454.7	454.8	▲285.8
Special Category (Note: Special category states, among other thing, get tax breaks)
19	Arunachal Pradesh	7.1	7.5	▲5.8
20	Assam	120.8	97.7	▲47.8
21	Himachal Pradesh	70.4	73.8	▲48.1
22	Jammu and Kashmir	78.2	101.4	▲70.7
23	Manipur	5.9	6.4	▲4.4
24	Meghalaya	11.9	15.6	▲11.2
25	Mizoram	4.4	4.8	▲3.7
26	Nagaland	5.1	5.7	▲3.9
27	Sikkim	6.5	7	▲4.8
28	Tripura	14.2	14.7	▲9.4
29	Uttarakhand	109	134.5	▲98.9
Non-Special Category UT
30	NCT Delhi	311.4	366	▲231.5
31	Puducherry	24	27.2	▲18.5

== State Government revenue and spending ==
Article 246 of the Indian Constitution, distributes legislative powers including taxation, between the Parliament of India and the State Legislature.

The constitution does not have provision for the central government and the States to have concurrent power of taxation. The tables below lists the thirteen taxes to be levied by the Central government and nineteen taxes by States including Gujarat.

=== Central government of India ===
SL. No.	Taxes as per Union List
82	Income tax: Taxes on income other than agricultural income.
83	Custom Duty: Duties of customs including export duties
84	Excise Duty: Duties of excise on the following goods manufactured or produced in India namely (a)Petroleum crude (b)high speed diesel (c)motor spirit (commonly known as petrol) (d)natural gas (e) aviation turbine fuel and (f)Tobacco and tobacco products
85	Corporation Tax
86	Taxes on capital value of assets, exclusive of agricultural land, of individuals and companies, taxes on capital of companies
87	Estate duty in respect of property other than agricultural land
88	Duties in respect of succession to property other than agricultural land
89	Terminal taxes on goods or passengers, carried by railway, sea or air; taxes on railway fares and freight.
90	Taxes other than stamp duties on transactions in stock exchanges and futures markets
92A	Taxes on sale or purchase of goods other than newspapers, where such sale or purchase takes place in the course of inter-State trade or commerce
92B	Taxes on the consignment of goods in the course of inter-State trade or commerce
97	All residuary types of taxes not listed in any of the three lists of Seventh Schedule of Indian Constitution

=== State governments ===
SL. No.	Taxes as per State List
45	Land revenue, including the assessment and collection of revenue, the maintenance of land records, survey for revenue purposes and records of rights, and alienation of revenues etc.
46	Taxes on agricultural income
47	Duties in respect of succession to agricultural land.
48	Estate Duty in respect of agricultural land
49	Taxes on lands and buildings.
50	Taxes on mineral rights.
51	Duties of excise for following goods manufactured or produced within the State (i) alcoholic liquors for human consumption, and (ii) opium, Indian hemp and other narcotic drugs and narcotics.
53	Electricity Duty:Taxes on the consumption or sale of electricity
54	Taxes on sale of petroleum crude, high speed diesel, motor spirit (commonly known as petrol), Natural gas aviation turbine fuel and alcohol liquor for human consumption but not including sale in the course of inter state or commerce or sale in the source of international trade or commerce such goods.
56	Taxes on goods and passengers carried by roads or on inland waterways.
57	Taxes on vehicles suitable for use on roads.
58	Taxes on animals and boats.
59	Tolls.
60	Taxes on profession, trades, callings and employments.
61	Capitation taxes.
62	Taxes on entertainment and amusements to be extent levied and collected by a panchayat or Municipality or a regional council or a district council.
63	Stamp duty

=== Goods and Services Tax ===
The tax came into effect from 1 July 2017 through the implementation of the One Hundred and First Amendment of the Constitution of India by the Indian government. The GST replaced existing multiple taxes levied by the central and state governments. It an indirect tax (or consumption tax) used on the supply of goods and services. It is a comprehensive, multistage, destination-based tax: comprehensive because it has subsumed almost all the indirect taxes except a few state taxes. Multi-staged as it is, the GST is imposed at every step in the production process, but is meant to be refunded to all parties in the various stages of production other than the final consumer and as a destination-based tax, it is collected from point of consumption and not point of origin like previous taxes.

== See also ==
- Taxation in India
- GSP of Indian states
- Demographics of India
- List of most populous cities in India
- List of most populous metropolitan areas in India
