= Mahratta =

Mahratta may refer to:

== An old spelling of ==
- Maratha caste, a ruling/warrior class of the Indian subcontinent
- Maratha Empire (1674–1820), India
- Marathi language and those who spoke that language, primarily residing in:
  - the state of Maharashtra in India

== Houses ==
- Mahratta (Wahroonga), a house in Sydney, Australia

== Media ==
- Mahratta, an English-language sister newspaper of Kesari (Marathi newspaper)

== Ships ==
- SS Mahratta (1891), lost on the Goodwin Sands in 1909
- SS Mahratta (1917), lost on the Goodwin Sands in 1939
- HMS Mahratta (G23), an M class destroyer torpedoed in 1944 with the loss of 220

== Military units of the British Indian Army ==
- 5th Mahratta Light Infantry,
- 103rd Mahratta Light Infantry
- 105th Mahratta Light Infantry
- 110th Mahratta Light Infantry
- 114th Mahrattas
- 116th Mahrattas
- 117th Mahrattas

== See also ==
- Marathi people
- Marhatta
- Satavahana Empire
- Mahratta War (disambiguation)
- Maratha (disambiguation)
