= Maharashtrian =

Maharashtrian is an adjective referring to something or someone belonging to (or living in) Maharashtra, a state of India. In particular, it may refer to:

- Maharashtrian Brahmin
- Maharashtrian cuisine
- Maharashtri Prakrit, a medieval language
- Marathi people, people native to Maharashtra

== See also ==
- Marathi (disambiguation)
- Maratha (disambiguation)
