= Maratha (disambiguation) =

Maratha are an Indo-Aryan ethnolinguistic group who are native to Maharashtra in western India.

Maratha or Marathas may also refer to:

- Maratha (Arcadia), a village of ancient Arcadia
- Maratha, Cyprus, a village
- Maratha (caste), a ruling/warrior class of the Indian subcontinent
- Maratha Empire (1674–1818), an empire that dominated a large portion of the Indian subcontinent.

== See also ==
- Marathwada, a region of Maharashtra, India
- Marhatta (region) (historical region) in india
- Maharathi, an exceptional warrior rank in Hindu mythological wars
- Maratha titles, nobility or orders of chivalry used by the Marathas of India
- Maratha clan system, the 96 Kuli (or "96 clan") designation for Marathas
- Mahratta (disambiguation)
- Mahratta War (disambiguation)
