= Labour laws in India =

Laws regulating labour in India

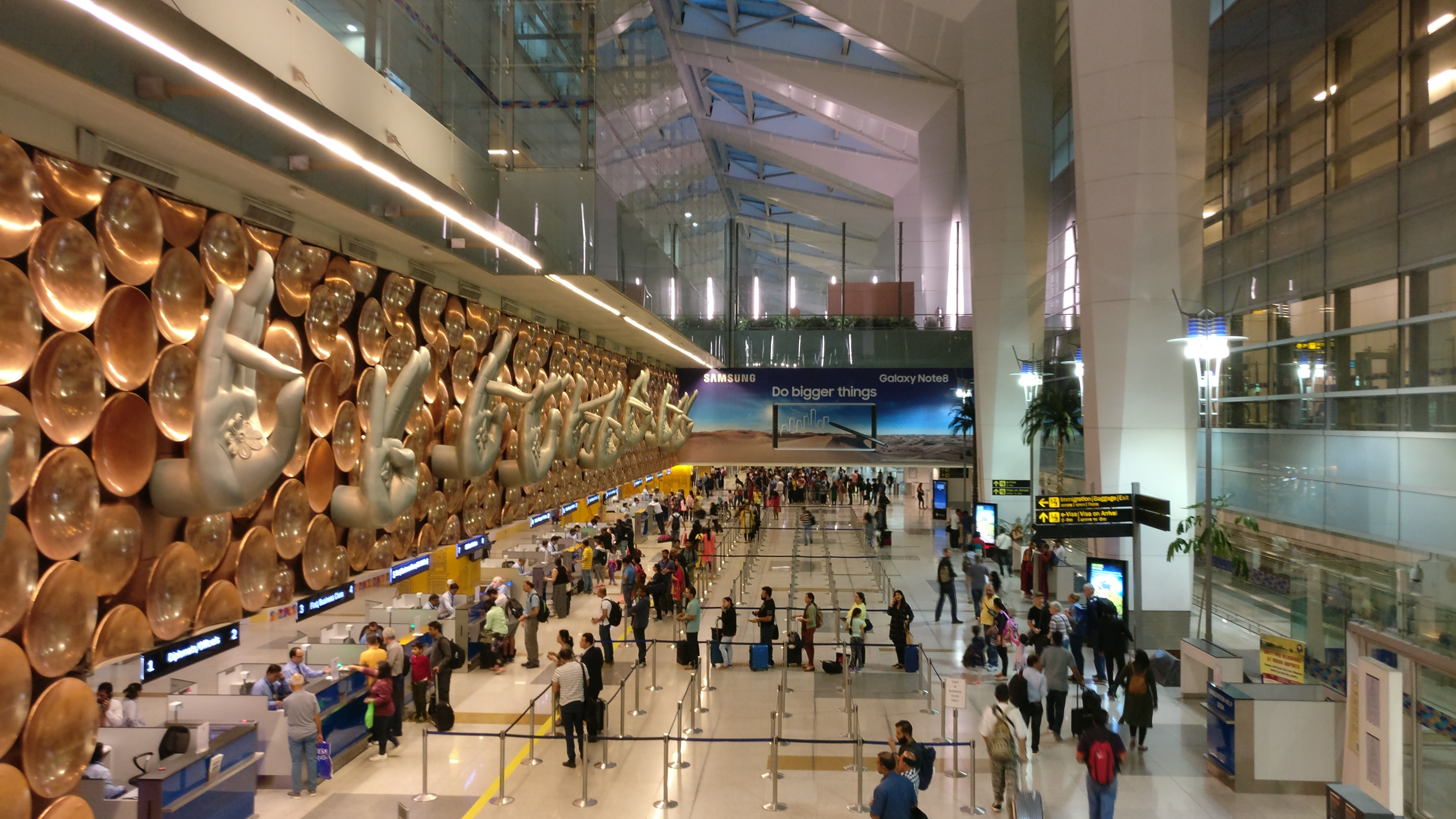
Accroding to the World Bank, India had 617.6 million total working population. the second largest after China. There was 6.1% unemployment, and 93.4% without trade union membership. The average income was $440/month, and the average working week was 40 hours.

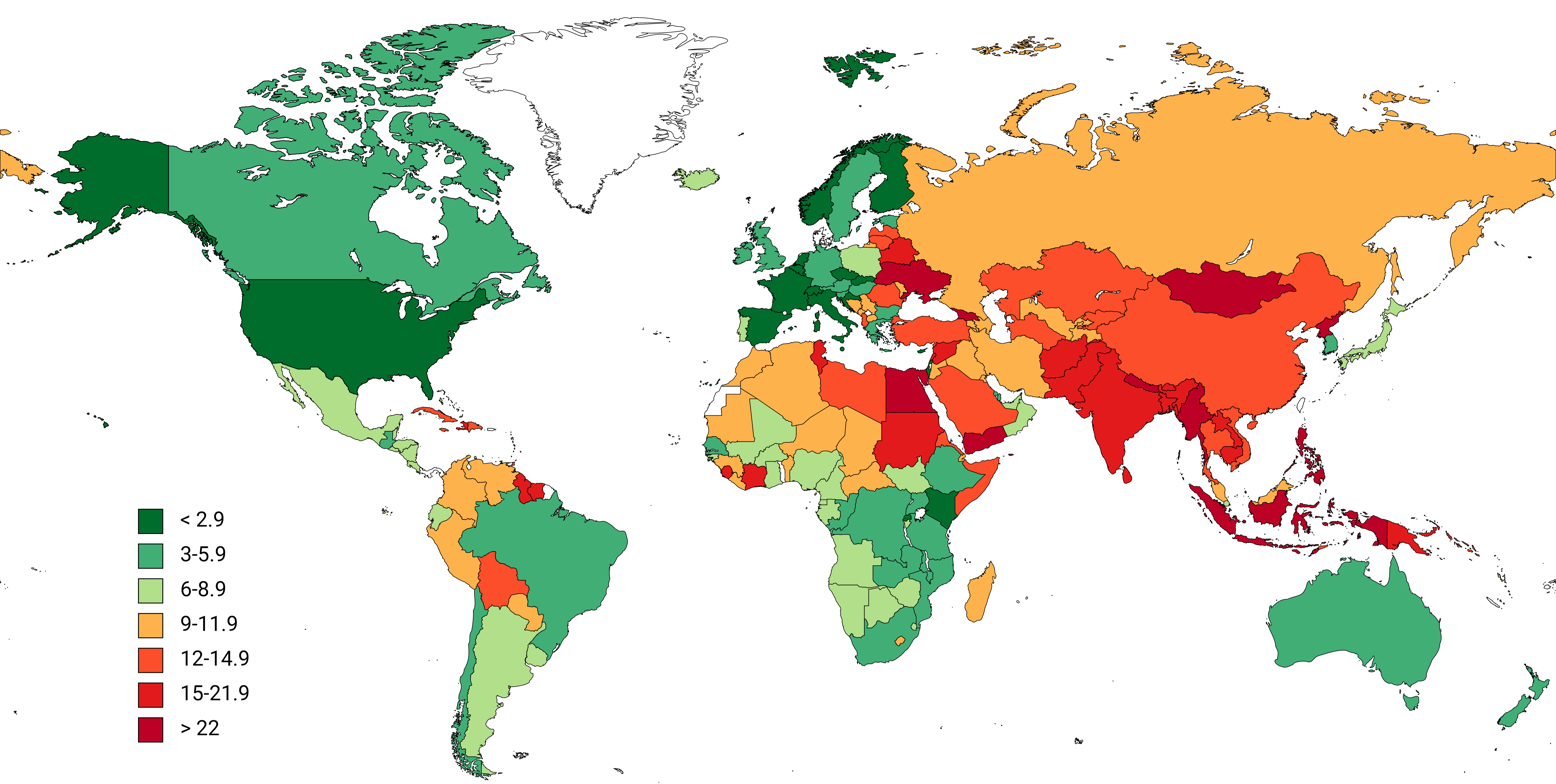
Deaths due to long working hours per 100,000 people (15+), joint study conducted by World Health Organization and International Labour Organization in 2016.

The laws related to labour and employment matters in India are broadly categorised as "industrial laws". The classification is based on the fact that many labour laws in India are limited in their application. Some apply only to factories employing 20 or more workers, some apply only to specific industries, and some grant the discretion to the Government of India or State Governments to notify the application of laws to specific industries or domains.

There are no unified, centralised labour laws in India, as the Constitution of India makes labour a Concurrent List subject, enabling both the central and state governments to make laws on labour. The specific entries are Entry 22, 23, and 24 in the Concurrent List under Schedule VII, read with Article 246 of the Constitution of India. Given the Constitutional sharing of powers on subject-matters related to labour, both the central and state government have enacted various statutes on labour and employment.

Labour laws in India are naturally interwoven with British colonialism. Pre-independence legislations were primarily intended to protect the interest of British employers. After independence, most labour laws were amended to make them more equitable. Until recently, central labour laws in India were fragmented across 40+ acts. The Parliament of India passed four labour codes in the 2019 and 2020. These four codes subsumed 29 central labour laws. The codes are: The Industrial Relations Code 2020, the Code on Social Security 2020, the Occupational Safety, Health and Working Conditions Code, 2020 and the Code on Wages 2019. The new codes came into force on 21 November 2025. The Press Information Bureau of India declared the enforcement as a historic reform (that) streamlines compliance, modernises outdated provisions, and creates a simplified, efficient framework that promotes ease of doing business while safeguarding workers’ rights and welfare.

== History ==
Indian labour law is closely connected to the Indian independence movement, and the campaigns of passive resistance leading up to independence. While India was under colonial rule during the British Raj, labour rights, trade unions, and freedom of association were all regulated by multiple acts:

- Indian Slavery Act, 1843
- Societies Registration Act, 1860
- Co-operative Societies Act, 1912
- Indian Trade Unions Act, 1926
- The Trades Disputes Act, 1929

Workers who sought better conditions, and trade unions who campaigned through strike action were frequently, and violently suppressed. After independence was won in 1947, the Constitution of India of 1950 embedded a series of fundamental labour rights in the constitution, particularly the right to join and take action in a trade union, the principle of equality at work, and the aspiration of creating a living wage with decent working conditions.

- 1921 Buckingham and Carnatic Mills Strike
- 1926 Binny Mill Strike
- 1928 South Indian Railway Strike
- Meerut Conspiracy Case (1929)
- 1974 railway strike in India
- Great Bombay Textile Strike in 1982
- Harthal in Kerala 2012

== Constitutional rights ==
In the Constitution of India from 1950, articles 14-16, 19(1)(c), 23-24, 38, and 41-43A directly concern labour rights. Article 14 states everyone should be equal before the law, article 15 specifically says the state should not discriminate against citizens, and article 16 extends a right of "equality of opportunity" for employment or appointment under the state. Article 19(1)(c) gives everyone a specific right "to form associations or unions". Article 23 prohibits all trafficking and forced labour, while article 24 prohibits child labour under 14 years old in a factory, mine or "any other hazardous employment".

Articles 38–39, and 41-43A, however, like all rights listed in Part IV of the Constitution are not enforceable by courts, rather than creating an aspirational "duty of the State to apply these principles in making laws". The original justification for leaving such principles unenforceable by the courts was that democratically accountable institutions ought to be left with discretion, given the demands they could create on the state for funding from general taxation, although such views have since become controversial. Article 38(1) says that in general the state should "strive to promote the welfare of the people" with a "social order in which justice, social, economic and political, shall inform all the institutions of national life." In article 38(2) it goes on to say the state should "minimise the inequalities in income" and based on all other statuses. Article 41 creates a "right to work", which the National Rural Employment Guarantee Act 2005 attempts to put into practice. Article 42 requires the state to "make provision for securing just and human conditions of work and for maternity relief". Article 43 says workers should have the right to a living wage and "conditions of work ensuring a decent standard of life". Article 43A, inserted by the Forty-second Amendment of the Constitution of India in 1976, creates a constitutional right to codetermination by requiring the state to legislate to "secure the participation of workers in the management of undertakings".

== Contract and rights ==
=== Scope of protection ===
Indian labour law makes a distinction between people who work in "organised" sectors and people working in "unorganised sectors". The laws list the sectors to which they apply. People who do not fall within these sectors, the ordinary law of contract applies.

India's labour laws underwent a major update in the Industrial Disputes Act of 1947. Since then, an additional 45 national laws expand or intersect with the 1948 act, and another 200 state laws control the relationships between the worker and the company. These laws mandate all aspects of employer-employee interaction, such as companies must keep 6 attendance logs, 10 different accounts for overtime wages, and file 5 types of annual returns. The scope of labour laws extend from regulating the height of urinals in workers' washrooms to how often a work space must be lime-washed. Inspectors can examine working space anytime and declare fines for violation of any labour laws and regulations.

=== Employment contracts ===
Among the employment contracts that are regulated in India, the regulation involves significant government involvement which is rare in developed countries. The Industrial Employment (Standing Orders) Act 1946 requires that employers have terms including working hours, leave, productivity goals, dismissal procedures or worker classifications, approved by a government body. The employment agreement is also governed by the suitable confidentiality, non-disclosure agreement (NDA) and non-compete clause (NCC) in agreements with employees. It has its roots in trade secret legislations under common law and intellectual property law. These may include the type of information that is likely to be disclosed, the manner in which it should be used and restrictions on disclosure post-termination.

The Contract Labour (Regulation and Abolition) Act 1970 aims at regulating employment of contract labour so as to place it at par with labour employed directly. Women are now permitted to work night shifts too (10 pm to 6 am).

The Latin phrase 'dies non' is being widely used by disciplinary authorities in government and industries for denoting the 'unauthorised absence' to the delinquent employees. According to Shri R. P. Saxena, chief engineer, Indian Railways, dies-non is a period which neither counted in service nor considered as break in service. A person can be marked dies-non, if

- absent without proper permission
- when on duty left without proper permission
- while in office but refused to perform duties

In cases of such willful and unauthorised absence from work, the leave sanctioning authority may decide and order that the days on which the work is not performed be treated as dies non-on the principle of no work no pay. This will be without prejudice to any other action that the competent authority might take against the persons resorting to such practises. The principle of "no work no pay" is widely being used in the banking industry in India. All other manufacturing industries and large service establishments like railways, posts and telecommunications are also implementing it to minimise the incidences of unauthorised absence of workers. The term 'industry' infuses a contractual relationship between the employer and the employee for sale of products and services which are produced through their cooperative endeavor.

This contract together with the need to put in efforts in producing goods and services imposes duties (including ancillary duties) and obligations on the part of the employees to render services with the tools provided and in a place and time fixed by the employer. And in return, as a quid pro quo, the employer is enjoined to pay wages for work done and or for fulfilling the contract of employment. Duties generally, including ancillary duties, additional duties, normal duties, emergency duties, which have to be done by the employees and payment of wages therefor. Where the contract of employment is not fulfilled or work is not done as prescribed, the principle of 'no work no pay' is brought into play.

In the Labour Law 2021, the government has approved an overtime payment to the employees working more than 15 minutes of scheduled shift. It is applicable from 1 April 2021.

=== Wage regulation ===
The Payment of Wages Act 1936 requires that employees receive wages, on time, and without any unauthorised deductions. Section 6 requires that people are paid in money rather than in kind. The law also provides the tax withholdings the employer must deduct and pay to the central or state government before distributing the wages.

The Minimum Wages Act 1948 sets wages for the different economic sectors that it states it will cover. It leaves a large number of workers unregulated. Central and state governments have discretion to set wages according to kind of work and location, and they range between as much as ₹ 143 to 1120 per day for work in the so-called central sphere. State governments have their own minimum wage schedules.

The Payment of Gratuity Act 1972 applies to establishments with 10 or more workers. Gratuity is payable to the employee if he or she resigns or retires. The Indian government mandates that this payment be at the rate of 15 days salary of the employee for each completed year of service subject to a maximum of ₹ 2000000.

The Payment of Bonus Act 1965, which applies only to enterprises with over 20 people, requires bonuses are paid out of profits based on productivity. The minimum bonus is currently 8.33 per cent of salary.

Weekly Holidays Act 1942

Beedi and Cigar Workers Act 1966

=== Health and safety ===
The Workmen's Compensation Act 1923 requires that compensation is paid if workers are injured in the course of employment for injuries, or benefits to dependants. The rates are low.

- Factories Act 1948, consolidated existing factory safety laws (replaced in 2020)
- Occupational Safety, Health and Working Conditions Code, 2020
- The Sexual Harassment of Women at Workplace (Prevention, Prohibition and Redressal) Act, 2013 that seeks to protect and provides a mechanism for women to report incidents of sexual harassment at their place of work.

=== Pensions and insurance ===
The Employees' Provident Fund and Miscellaneous Provisions Act 1952 (repealed in 2020) created the Employees' Provident Fund Organisation of India. This functions as a pension fund for old age security for the organised workforce sector. For those workers, it creates Provident Fund to which employees and employers contribute equally, and the minimum contributions are 10-12 per cent of wages. On retirement, employees may draw their pension.

- Indira Gandhi National Old Age Pension Scheme
- National Pension Scheme
- Public Provident Fund (India)

The Employees' State Insurance provides health and social security insurance. This was created by the Employees' State Insurance Act 1948.

The Unorganised Workers' Social Security Act 2008 (repealed in 2020) was passed to extend the coverage of life and disability benefits, health and maternity benefits, and old age protection for unorganised workers. "Unorganised" is defined as home-based workers, self-employed workers or daily-wage workers. The state government was meant to formulate the welfare system through rules produced by the National Social Security Board.

The Maternity Benefit Act 1961 (repealed in 2020), creates rights to payments of maternity benefits for any woman employee who worked in any establishment for a period of at least 80 days during the 12 months immediately preceding the date of her expected delivery. On 30 March 2017 the president of India Pranab Mukherjee approved the Maternity Benefit (Amendment) Act, 2017 which provides for 26-weeks paid maternity leave for women employees.

The Employees' Provident Funds and Miscellaneous Provisions Act, 1952 (repealed in 2020), provides for compulsory contributory fund for the future of an employee after his/her retirement or for his/her dependents in case of employee's early death. It extends to the whole of India.:

- every factory engaged in any industry specified in Schedule 1 in which 20 or more persons are employed.
- every other establishment employing 20 or more persons or class of such establishments that the Central Govt. may notify.
- any other establishment so notified by the Central Government even if employing less than 20 persons.

=== The Code On Social Security, 2020 ===
The Code on Social Security, 2020, consolidating 9 central labour enactments relating to social security.

=== India’s New Labour Laws, 2025 ===
India’s New Labour Laws, 2025 refer to the implementation of four consolidated labour codes introduced by the Government of India to simplify and modernise the country’s labour law framework. These codes subsume 29 earlier central labour enactments and regulate wages, industrial relations, social security, and occupational safety, health and working conditions. The reforms extend statutory benefits such as provident fund, insurance, and gratuity to gig and platform workers, standardise wage definitions, and mandate formal employment documentation. Aimed at improving ease of compliance and worker welfare, the new laws seek to balance labour protection with economic flexibility in a changing employment landscape.

== Workplace participation ==
=== Trade unions ===
Article 19(1)(c) of the Constitution of India gives everyone an enforceable right "to form associations or unions".

The Trade Unions Act 1926, amended in 2001, contains rules on governance and general rights of trade unions. It is repealed by the Industrial Relations Code, 2020.

=== Board representation ===
It was the view of many in the Indian Independence Movement, including Mahatma Gandhi, that workers had as much of a right to participate in management of firms as shareholders or other property owners. Article 43A of the Constitution, inserted by the Forty-second Amendment of the Constitution of India in 1976, created a right to codetermination by requiring the state to legislate to "secure the participation of workers in the management of undertakings". However, like other rights in Part IV, this article is not directly enforceable but instead creates a duty upon state organs to implement its principles through legislation (and potentially through court cases). In 1978 the Sachar Report recommended legislation for inclusion of workers on boards, however this had not yet been implemented.

The Industrial Disputes Act 1947 section 3 created a right of participation in joint work councils to "provide measures for securing amity and good relations between the employer and workmen and, to that end to comment upon matters of their common interest or concern and endeavour to compose any material difference of opinion in respect of such matters". However, trade unions had not taken up these options on a large scale. In National Textile Workers Union v Ramakrishnan the Supreme Court, Bhagwati J giving the leading judgment, held that employees had a right to be heard in a winding up petition of a company because their interests were directly affected and their standing was not excluded by the wording of the Companies Act, 1956 section 398. It is repealed by the Industrial Relations Code, 2020.

- Excel Wearv. Union of India A.I.R. 1979 S.C. 25, 36

=== Collective action ===
The Industrial Disputes Act 1947 regulates how employers may address industrial disputes such as lockouts, layoffs, retrenchment etc. It controls the lawful processes for reconciliation, adjudication of labour disputes.

According to fundamental rules (FR 17A) of the civil service of India, a period of unauthorised absence- (i) in the case of employees working in industrial establishments, during a strike which has been declared illegal under the provisions of the Industrial Disputes Act, 1947, or any other law for the time being in force; (ii) in the case of other employees as a result of action in combination or in concerted manner, such as during a strike, without any authority from, or valid reason to the satisfaction of the competent authority; shall be deemed to cause an interruption or break in the service of the employee, unless otherwise decided by the competent authority for the purpose of leave travel concession, quasi-permanency and eligibility for appearing in departmental examinations, for which a minimum period of continuous service is required.

- Provisions of the Factories Act 1948

=== Industrial Relations Code, 2020 ===
The Industrial Relations Code, 2020 consolidated and amended the laws relating to trade unions, conditions of employment in industrial establishment or undertaking, investigation and settlement of industrial disputes. The act combines and simplifies the 3 central labour laws listed above.

== Equality ==
Article 14 states everyone should be equal before the law, article 15 specifically says the state should not discriminate against citizens, and article 16 extends a right of "equality of opportunity" for employment or appointment under the state. Article 23 prohibits all trafficking and forced labour, while article 24 prohibits child labour under 14 years old in a factory, mine or "any other hazardous employment".

=== Gender discrimination ===
Article 39(d) of the Constitution provides that men and women should receive equal pay for equal work. In the Equal Remuneration Act 1976 implemented this principle in legislation.

- Randhir Singh v Union of India Supreme Court of India held that the principle of equal pay for equal work is a constitutional goal and therefore capable of enforcement through constitutional remedies under Article 32 of Constitution
- State of AP v G Sreenivasa Rao, equal pay for equal work does not mean that all the members of the same cadre must receive the same pay packet irrespective of their seniority, source of recruitment, educational qualifications and various other incidents of service.
- State of MP v Pramod Baratiya, comparisons should focus on similarity of skill, effort and responsibility when performed under similar conditions
- Mackinnon Mackenzie & Co v Adurey D'Costa, a broad approach is to be taken to decide whether duties to be performed are similar

=== Sexual Orientation and Gender Identity ===
The Transgender Persons (Protection of Rights) Act, 2019 bans discrimination on the basis of gender identity in employment. Furthermore, the following judicial writ of mandamus ban discrimination on the basis of sexual orientation in employment.

- Navtej Singh Johar v. Union of India, Sexual orientation is protected under the right to privacy and LGBT rights are protected by the Indian constitution under Article 15.
- Pramod Kumar Sharma v. State of Uttar Pradesh, prohibits discrimination and firing from employment on the grounds of sexual orientation.

=== Caste Discrimination ===
The Scheduled Caste and Scheduled Tribe (Prevention of Atrocities) Act, 1989 bans discrimination on the basis of caste including in employment and pursuance of profession or trade. The legislation has often been called the "world's most powerful anti-discrimination law".

=== Migrant workers ===
- Interstate Migrant Workmen Act 1979, It is now replaced by the Occupational Safety, Health and Working Conditions Code, 2020

=== Vulnerable groups ===
Bonded Labour System (Abolition) Act 1976, abolishes bonded labour, but estimates suggest that between 2 million and 5 million workers still remain in debt bondage in India.

- Domestic workers in India

Child labour in India is prohibited by the Constitution, article 24, in factories, mines and hazardous employment, and that under article 21 the state should provide free and compulsory education up to a child is aged 14. However, in practice, the laws are not enforced properly.

- Sumangali (child labour)
- Juvenile Justice (Care and Protection) of Children Act 2000
- Child Labour (Prohibition and Abolition) Act 1986

== Job security ==
=== Fair dismissal ===
Some of India's most controversial labour laws concern the procedures for dismissal contained in the Industrial Disputes Act 1947. A workman who has been employed for over a year can only be dismissed if permission is sought from and granted by the appropriate government office. Additionally, before dismissal, valid reasons must be given, and there is a wait of at least two months for government permission, before a lawful termination can take effect.

A permanent worker can be terminated only for proven misconduct or for habitual absence. The Industrial Disputes Act (1947) requires companies employing more than 100 workers to seek government approval before they can fire employees or close down. In practice, permissions for firing employees are seldom granted. Indian laws require a company to get permission for dismissing workers with plant closing, even if it is necessary for economic reasons. The government may grant or deny permission for closing, even if the company is losing money on the operation.

The dismissed worker has a right to appeal, even if the government has granted the dismissal application. Indian labour regulations provide for a number of appeal and adjudicating authorities – conciliation officers, conciliation boards, courts of inquiry, labour courts, industrial tribunals and the national industrial tribunal – under the Industrial Disputes Act. These involve complex procedures. Beyond these labour appeal and adjudicating procedures, the case can proceed to respective State High Court or finally the Supreme Court of India.

- Bharat Forge Co Ltd v Uttam Manohar Nakate [2005] INSC 45, a worker found sleeping for the fourth time in 1983. Bharat Forge initiated disciplinary proceedings under the Industrial Employment Act (1946). After five months of proceedings, the worker was found guilty and dismissed. The worker appealed to the labour court, pleading that his dismissal was unfair under Indian Labour laws. The labour court sided with the worker, directed he be reinstated, with 50% back wages. The case went through several rounds of appeal and up through India's court system. After 22 years, the Supreme Court of India upheld his dismissal in 2005.

=== Redundancy ===
Redundancy pay must be given, set at 15 days' average pay for each complete year of continuous service. An employee who has worked for 4 years in addition to various notices and due process, must be paid a minimum of the employee's wage equivalent to 60 days before retrenchment, if the government grants the employer a permission to lay off.

=== Full employment ===
- National Rural Employment Guarantee Act 2005

The Industries (Regulation and Development) Act 1951 declared that manufacturing industries under its First Schedule were under common central government regulations in addition to whatever laws state government enact. It reserved over 600 products that can only be manufactured in small-scale enterprises, thereby regulating who can enter in these businesses, and above all placing a limit on the number of employees per company for the listed products. The list included all key technology and industrial products in the early 1950s, including products ranging from certain iron and steel products, fuel derivatives, motors, certain machinery, machine tools, to ceramics and scientific equipment.

== State laws ==
Each state in India may have special labour regulations in certain circumstances. Every state in India makes its own regulations for the Central Act. The regulations may vastly differ from state to state. The forms and procedures used will be different in each state. The Central Government is in the process on simplifying these multiple state laws into 4 Labour Codes. They are Code on 1. Wages, 2. Social Security and Welfare, 3. Industrial Relations, 4. Occupational Safety and Health and Working Conditions.

=== Gujarat ===
In 2004, the Gujarat government amended the Industrial Disputes Act to allow greater labour market flexibility in the Special Export Zones of Gujarat. The law allows companies within SEZs to lay off redundant workers, without seeking the permission of the government, by giving a formal notice and severance pay.

=== West Bengal ===
The West Bengal government revised its labour laws making it virtually impossible to shut down a loss-making factory. The West Bengal law applies to all companies within the state that employ 70 or more employees.

== International comparison ==
The table below contrasts the labour laws in India to those in China and United States, as of 2022.

Relative regulations and rigidity in labour laws
Practice required by law	India	China	United States
Minimum wage (US$/month)	₹12,500 (US$130) /month	182.5	1242.6
Standard work day	8 hours	8 hours	8 hours
Minimum rest while at work	one hour per 6-hour	None	None
Maximum overtime limit	125 hours per year	432 hours per year	None
Premium pay for overtime	100%	50%	None
Dismissal due to redundancy or closure of the factory	Yes, if approved by local labor department	Yes, without approval of government	Yes, without approval of government
Government approval required for 1 person dismissal	Yes	No	No
Government approval required for 9 person dismissal	Yes	No	No
Government approval for redundancy dismissal granted	Yes	Not applicable	Not applicable
Dismissal rules regulated	Yes	Yes	No

Many observers have argued that India's labour laws should be reformed. The laws have constrained the growth of the formal manufacturing sector. According to a World Bank report in 2008, heavy reform would be desirable. The executive summary stated,

India's labour regulations - among the most restrictive and complex in the world - have constrained the growth of the formal manufacturing sector where these laws have their widest application. Better designed labour regulations can attract more labour- intensive investment and create jobs for India's unemployed millions and those trapped in poor quality jobs. Given the country's momentum of growth, the window of opportunity must not be lost for improving the job prospects for the 80 million new entrants who are expected to join the work force over the next decade.

Ex-Prime Minister Manmohan Singh in 2005 had said that new labour laws are needed, however no reforms were made to effect.

In Uttam Nakate case, the Bombay High Court held that dismissing an employee for repeated sleeping on the factory floor was illegal - a decision which was overturned by the Supreme Court of India. However, it took two decades to complete the legal process. In 2008, the World Bank criticised the complexity, lack of modernisation and flexibility in Indian regulations.

== See also ==
- Labour law
- List of countries by unemployment rate
- United Kingdom labour law
- United States labor law
- European labour law
- German labour law
- International labour law
- Occupational safety and health
- International Society for Labor Law and Social Security
- Pensions in India
- Social security in India
- Shram suvidha
- Technological unemployment
- Trade unions in India
- Unemployment benefits
- Criticism of capitalism
- Exploitation of labour
- Forced labour
- Work–life balance
