= Factories Act, 1948 (India) =

Act for occupational safety and health in factories and docks in India

Constituent Assembly of India
- Long title: An Act to consolidate and amend the law regulating labour in factories.
- Citation: Act No. 63 of 1948
- Territorial extent: India
- Enacted by: Dominion Legislature of India
- Enacted: 23 September 1948
- Assented to by: Governor-General C. Rajagopalachari
- Assented to: 23 September 1948
- Commenced: 1 April 1949

Repealed by
- Occupational Safety, Health and Working Conditions Code, 2020
- Status: Repealed

The Factories Act, 1948 (Act No. 63 of 1948), as amended by the Factories (Amendment) Act, 1987 (Act 20 of 1987), served to assist in formulating national policies in India with respect to occupational safety and health in factories and docks in India. It deals with various problems concerning safety, health, efficiency and well-being of the persons at workplaces. It was replaced by the Occupational Safety, Health and Working Conditions Code, 2020.

The amended Act is administered by the Ministry of Labour and Employment in India through its Directorate General Factory Advice Service & Labour Institutes (DGFASLI) and by the State Governments through their factory inspectorates. DGFASLI advises the Central and State Governments on administration of the Factories Act and coordinating the factory inspection services in the States.

The Act is applicable to any factory using electricity and employing 10 or more workers and if not using power, employing 20 or more workers on any day of the preceding twelve months, and in any part of which a manufacturing process is being carried on with the aid of power, or is ordinarily so carried on, or whereon twenty or more workers are working, or were working on any day of the preceding twelve months, and in any part of which a manufacturing process is being carried on without any power.

== Major contents ==
Various provisions are described in following chapters:

- CHAPTER I.- Preliminary
- CHAPTER II.- The Inspecting Staff
- CHAPTER III.- Health
- CHAPTER IV.- Safety's
- CHAPTER IVA.- Provisions relating to Hazardous processes
- CHAPTER V.- Welfare & Grievance
- CHAPTER VI.- Working hours of adults
- CHAPTER VII.- Employment of young persons
- CHAPTER VIII.- Annual leave with wages
- CHAPTER IX.- Special provisions
- CHAPTER X.- Penalties and procedure
- CHAPTER XI.- Supplemental

== Repeals ==
1	1934	XXV	The Factories Act, 1934
2	1944	XIV	The Factories (Amendment) Act, 1944
3	1945	III	The Factories (Amendment) Act, 1945
4	1946	X	The Factories (Amendment) Act, 1946
5	1947	V	The Factories (Amendment) Act, 1947

== List of amending acts and adaptation order ==
1.	The Repealing and Amending Act, 1949 (40 of 1949).
2.	The Adaptation of Laws Order, 1950.
3.	The Repealing and Amending Act, 1950 (35 of 1950).
4.	The Part B States (Laws) Act, 1951 (3 of 1951).
5.	The Factories (Amendment) Act, 1954 (25 of 1954).
6.	The Central Labour Laws (Extension to Jammu and Kashmir) Act, 1970 (51 of 1970).
7.	The Factories (Amendment) Act, 1976 (94 of 1976).
8.	The Factories (Amendment) Act, 1987 (20 of 1987).

== Compliance ==
The Factories Act, 1948 governs the health, safety, welfare, working hours, and employment conditions of workers in factories. Compliance under this Act ensures that factories operate in a safe and regulated environment. Here are the key compliance requirements to be maintained:

- Factory License along with Approved Plans
- Register of Compensatory Holidays
- Abstract of the Act and Rules
- Report of examination or test of pressure vessel or plant.
- Report of Examination of Water-sealed gasholder
- Overtime register
- Notice of period of work
- Register of adult workers
- Register of Leave with wages
- Leave with wages card.
- Health Register
- Report of accident including, dangerous occurrence
- Notice of Poisoning or Disease
- Annual Return
- Muster Roll
- Inspection book
- Identity Card

== See also ==
- Factories 1961
- Industrial Disputes Act, 1947
