= Unorganised sector (India) =

Unincorporated private enterprise

The term unorganised sector when used in the Indian contexts defined by the National Commission for Enterprises in the Unorganised Sector, in their Report on Conditions of Work and Promotion of Livelihoods in the Unorganised Sector as "... consisting of all unincorporated private enterprises owned by individuals or households engaged in the sale or production of goods and services operated on a proprietary or partnership basis and with less than ten total workers."

Amongst the characteristic features of this sector are ease of entry, smaller scale of operation, local ownership, uncertain legal status, labour-intensive and operating using lower technology based methods, flexible pricing, less sophisticated packing, absence of a brand name, unavailability of good storage facilities and an effective distribution network, inadequate access to government schemes, finance and government aid, lower entry barriers for employees, a higher proportion of migrants with a lower rate of compensation. Employees of enterprises belonging to the unorganised sector have lower job security and poorer chances of growth, and no leave or paid holidays, they have lower protection against employers indulging in unfair or illegal practices.

A NCEUS report estimates that in 2005 out of the 458 million persons employed in India, 95 percent or 435 million worked in the unorganised sector, generating 50.6 percent of the country's gross domestic product.

== See also ==
- Unorganised Workers' Identification Numberin secured loan
