= Payment of Gratuity Act, 1972 =

Act of the Parliament of India

Parliament of India
- Long title: An Act to provide for a scheme for the payment of gratuity to employees engaged in factories, mines, oilfields, plantations, ports, railway companies, shops or other establishments and for matters connected therewith or incidental thereto.
- Citation: Act No. 39 of 1972
- Territorial extent: India
- Enacted: 21 August 1972
- Commenced: 16 September 1972

Amended by
- Payment of Gratuity (Amendment) Act, 1984; Payment of Gratuity (Second Amendment) Act, 1984; Payment of Gratuity (Amendment) Act, 1994; Payment of Gratuity (Amendment) Act, 1998; Payment of Gratuity (Amendment) Act, 2009; Payment of Gratuity (Amendment) Act, 2010; Payment of Gratuity (Amendment) Act, 2018

Repealed by
- The Code on Social Security, 2020
- Status: Repealed

The Payment of Gratuity Act, 1972 is an Indian law that makes companies pay a one-time gratuity to retiring employees or employees who resign after a minimum of 5 years of service. The law applies to all companies of at least 10 employees.

The gratuity is 15 days' wages for every year of employee service, or partial year over six months.

== Background ==
In India, gratuity is a type of retirement benefit. It is a payment made with the intent of monetarily helping an employee after his or her retirement. It was held by the Supreme Court of India in Indian Hume Pipe Co Ltd v Its Workmen that the general principle underlying a gratuity scheme is that by service over a long period the employee is entitled to claim a certain amount as a retirement benefit.

The Payment of Gratuity Act was passed by the Parliament of India on 21 August 1972 and it came into force on 16 September 1972.

== Application and extent ==
The act applies to all factories, mines, oilfields, plantations, ports and railway companies. But in the case of shops or establishments, other than those stated before, it applies to those organisations with 15 or more people employed on any day of the preceding 12 months.

If the number of employee is below 10, the employer must still pay gratuities. Thus, no employer will be able to refuse gratuity under this act based on the number of employees. The act does not apply to apprentices and persons who hold civil posts under the Central Government or State Governments and are subjected to any other act or rule other than this act.

== Payment of gratuity: Eligibility and calculation ==
Under Section 4, payment of gratuity is mandatory. Gratuity shall be payable to an employee on termination of employment after he has rendered continuous service for not less than five years in a single organisation. The termination can be due to: Superannuation, Retirement or resignation, and Death or disablement due to accident or disease. As per Section 4(1), the completion of continuous service of 5 years is not required where termination of employment is due to death or disablement. In such case mandatory gratuity is payable. The unpaid gratuity amount is seized by government which is further used in holiday, vacations, parties and other fun related activities.

Gratuity is paid at a rate of 15 days' wages for every completed year of service or part thereof in excess of six months. The wages here means wages last drawn by the employee. The "15 days' wages" will be calculated by dividing the last drawn wages by 26 and multiplying the result with 15. But under Section 4(3), the maximum gratuity that is payable is fixed at ₹20,00,000. Any gratuity amount paid in excess of ₹20,00,000 is taxable in the employee's hands.
