= Inter-State Migrant Workmen (Regulation of Employment and Conditions of Service) Act, 1979 =

Parliament of India
- Long title: An Act to regulate the employment of inter-State migrant workmen and to provide for their conditions of service and for matters connected therewith.
- Citation: Act No. 30 of 1979
- Enacted by: Parliament of India
- Assented to: 11 June 1979
- Commenced: 1 June 1987

Repealed by
- Occupational Safety, Health and Working Conditions Code, 2020
- Status: Repealed

The Inter-State Migrant Workmen (Regulation of Employment and Conditions of Service) Act, 1979 was an Act of the Parliament of India enacted to regulate the condition of service of inter-state labourers in Indian labour law. The Act's purpose was to protect workers whose services are requisitioned outside their native states in India. Whenever an employer faces shortage of skills among the locally available workers, the act created provisions to employ better skilled workers available outside the state. The act was replaced by the Occupational Safety, Health and Working Conditions Code, 2020

== Background ==
The employment system of interstate migrant labour was an exploitative system prevalent more or less all over India. It was rampantly institutionalized in Orissa and in some other states. In Orissa the migrant labour (called dadan labour locally) through contractors or agents (called Sardars / Khatedars) are sent for work outside the state in large construction projects. This system lends itself to various abuses. Sardar promising at the time of recruitment that wages would be calculated on piece rate basis would not be settled every month as promised. Once the worker came under clutches of the contractor he took him to a far off place on payment of railways fare only. No working hours were fixed for interstate migrant workers and they had to work on all the days in a week under extremely bad working conditions.

Twenty eighth State Labour Ministers conference held on 21-10-1976 recommended for setting up of a small compact committee to examine all issues and suggest measures for eliminating the abuses prevalent in the interstate workers deployment. The compact committee which was constituted in February 1977, recommended the enactment of a separate central legislation to regulate the employment of interstate migrant workers as it was felt the provisions of the Contract Labour (Regulation and Abolition) Act 1970, even after necessary amendments would not adequately take care of the variety of malpractices indulged in by the principal employers/contractors/Sardars/Khatedars etc. and the required facilities to be provided to these workmen in view of the peculiar circumstances in which they are working.

The recommendations of compact committee had been examined in consultation with the state governments and the relevant central ministries, Interstate Migrant Workmen (Regulation of Employment and Conditions of Service) Act, 1979 was passed by both houses of Parliament and President of India gave his assent on 11-06-1979.

This Act makes provision for availing with the onsite services of interstate workers by the contractors / establishments to overcome only the temporary shortage of required skilled workers in a state. The purpose of this act is not to encourage interstate migration of workers against the interests of local workers as the principal employers would have to incur more cost in deploying interstate workers.

== Contents ==
=== Rights of interstate workers ===
In addition to the general labour laws applicable to all workers, the interstate workers are entitled with

- equal or better wages for the similar nature & duration of work applicable for the local workmen or stipulated minimum wages under the Minimum Wages Act, 1948 whichever is more,
- displacement allowance (Section 14),
- home journey allowance (Section 15) including payment of wages during the period of journey,
- suitable residential accommodation and medical facilities free of charge on mandatory basis.
- Termination of employment after the contract period without any liability.
- Right to lodge compliant with the authorities within three months of any incident, accident, etc.

=== Role of contractors ===
Registration of all contractors who employs or employed five or more Interstate Migrant Workmen on any day of the preceding 12 months.

- Furnish the details of workmen periodically in such forms as prescribed by state government.
- Maintain the registers indicating the details of interstate workers and make available for scrutiny by the statutory authorities.
- Issue of passbook affixed with a passport-sized photograph of the workman indicating the name and the place of the establishment where the worker is employed, the period of employment, rates of wages, etc. to every inter-state migrant workman.
- Reporting by the contractor the incidence of fatal accident or serious injury of such workman to the specified authorities of both the States and also the next of kin of the workman.
- Liable for the prescribed punishments for violations committed under this Act.

=== Role of principal employers ===
- Registration of all principal employers who employs or employed directly or indirectly five or more Interstate Migrant Workmen on any day of the preceding 12 months.
- Maintain the registers indicating the details of interstate workers and make available for scrutiny by the statutory authorities.
- Every principal employer shall nominate a representative duly authorized by him to be present at the time of disbursement of wages by the contractor and it shall be the duty of such representative to certify the amounts paid as wages in such manner and may be prescribed.
- Principal employer shall be liable to bear the wages and other benefits to interstate workers in case of failure by the contractor to effect the same.
- Liable for the prescribed punishments for violations committed under this Act.

=== Role of state governments ===
- Appointment of inspectors to oversee implementation of this act.
- Appointment of registration officers to grant and revoke registration of contractors / principal employers / establishments.
- Appointment of licensing officers to grant, suspend and revoke licenses to contractors / principal employers / establishments
- Making rules for carrying out the purposes of this Act subject to the condition of previous publication
- Entertaining appeals from the aggrieved parties and disposal of the same as per this Act

== Actual implementation ==
As per the census of the year 1991, nearly 20 million people migrated to other states seeking livelihood. Within a decade, the number of interstate migrants doubled to 41,166,265 persons as per the census figures of 2001. It is estimated that there are at present around 80 million migrants of which, 40 million are in the construction industry, 20 million are domestic workers, 12 million working in illegal mines otherwise called “small scale quarries”, etc. Since the stipulations of this act are not implemented in true spirit by the state governments, more and more interstate workers are deployed in miserable working conditions at wages far below the prevailing local wages. The vested interest of labour departments in collusion with the principal employers /contractors is the main stumbling block to implement this act which is hurting the interests of the local workmen and the improvement in their living standards.

== Proposed amendment ==
The Interstate Migrant Workers (Regulation of Employment and Conditions of Service) Amendment Bill, 2011 is proposed to make this Act gender neutral by amending its title and replacing the word ‘workman and workmen’ by the words ‘worker and workers’ respectively. However, the lawmakers have not thought of bringing additional provisions to implement this Act strictly with more accountability and punishments for violations.

=== Possible improvements ===
- All interstate workers should be registered in gram panchayat or municipality or corporation compulsory.
- All interstate workers shall be provided with the benefits of Public Distribution System (PDS) Cards to avoid buying food grains and kerosene at higher prices. Adhar identity card shall be made compulsory for the interstate workers.
- The remuneration to interstate workers shall be deposited in their bank accounts and not by cash by the contractors
- Every state government shall mandatorily operate an internet portal indicating the registered principal employers, contractors, establishments and interstate workmen details including Adhar card data for general public information and verification. The details of interstate workmen shall be uploaded by the principal employers and contractors promptly. Non compliance by the principal employers or contractors is treated as violation of the Act and liable for punishment.
- No contractor shall deploy the workers outside the state without getting registered in that state. All the details of the interstate workers deployment outside the state shall be made available to the state authorities promptly.
- The state government authorities shall conduct mandatory yearly audit of all employers / contractors in a state regarding deployment of interstate workers and submit yearly compliance status or implementation report to the state assembly for their scrutiny.
- The ongoing finance commission shall give weight age in devolution of central government funds to the states which are giving more employment to interstate workers as they are ahead in demographic transition. Demographic transition of a state is a real index & status of all round human and economical development.

== Social problems ==
More and more interstate workers deployment is bringing social and cultural tensions in the states which are created on linguistic basis. Interstate workers being under the hold of their employers are scared of associating with local workers in ameliorating their living standards and working conditions. Many times interstate workers are reluctant to learn speaking in local majority language and to understand the local customs. Some times in the guise of interstate workers, interstate thieves / robbers / dacoits commit theft, murders, etc. creating law and order problems.

== See also ==
- Indian labour law
- UK labour law
- Constitution of India
- List of Indian federal legislation
- Illegal immigration in India
- Illegal Migrants (Determination by Tribunal) Act (IMDT)
