= National Commission for Enterprises in the Unorganised Sector =

Agency overview
- Agency executive: Chairman; Deputy Chairman
- Parent agency: Ministry of Micro, Small and Medium Enterprises
- Website: NCEUS

The National Commission for Enterprises in the Unorganised Sector (NCEUS) is a national body commissioned by the Indian government to address the issues faced by enterprises in relation to the unorganised sector

== Background ==
The Commission was established in 2004 under the chairmanship of Dr. Arjun Sengupta to act as an advisory board for matters regarding the informal employment sector. In India, the informal sector of the economy represents 80.8% of the total workforce (according to PFLS 2017-18 report).

In 2006 to solve the problem of unorganized sector, Labour Ministry of India has found a commission which is known as Arjun Sengupta Commission and making its recommendation as a basis a National Commission for Enterprise Unorganized Sector was constituted.
