= Unorganised Workers' Identification Number =

Proposed identification in India

Unorganised Workers' Identification Number or UWIN is a proposed unique number to be issued as identity proof to unorganised workers in India.

The unorganised workers’ Identification Number is a number provided to the large section of unorganised sector workers by issuing a unique ID and allotting an Aadhaar seeded identification number without issuing any smart cards. In 2014 the Union Ministry of Labour and Employment had decided to design and develop the unorganised workers’ Identification Number (UWIN) – platform under the unorganised workers’ Social Security Act 2008 and had mandated every unorganised sector worker to get themselves registered under the UWIN – platform. The Ministry of Labour and Employment has allocated a sum of ₹402.7 crores for the implementation of the project in two phases.

The Indian labour force is divided into Formal and an Informal sector which consists of 47.41 crore people of which 82.7% of the labour force lie under the unorganised sector and 17.3% lie under the organized sector as per the NSSO survey 2011–12. Therefore, to provide the social security benefits the Government of India had enacted the unorganised workers’ Social Security Act in 2008, to create a right-based legal framework for providing the social security framework to the least benefited unorganised sector workers. Under this act the provision of UWIN is made to provide these workers with all the social security benefits. At present there is no centralized database that shows the number of unorganised workers in India. UWIN will help to build the national unorganised worker's database.

According to the expectation of the Ministry of Labour and Employment, the national database of unorganised workers shall cover 675 districts in 29 states and 7 union territories and will be useful for other ministries to provide benefits to the workers under the social security schemes.

== Objectives ==
- Creation of a single unified sanitized database for unorganised workers to act as a platform to enable social security services to be provided to unorganised workers.
- Identification of unorganised workers after they are duly registered, assigning a unique UWIN (unorganised Workers Identification Number) to every registered worker.
- The card will include family details through concept of nuclear family and linked family, and associated linkages to facilitate delivery of family-based benefits through the scheme.
- This Platform will assist in identifying and enabling skill development requirement, employer-worker mapping and outcome-based policy formulation and decision making.
- Expand the social security schemes’ benefits to approximately 15 Crore Families (40 Crore Unorganised Workers).

== Stakeholders ==
- State governments: The primary usage of the UWIN platform would be in the hands of the state government where they will be responsible for the operational and implementation management of UWIN. Activities of the registration, identification, beneficiary management would be undertaken under the jurisdiction of the state governments.
- Unorganised workers and their families (UWIN beneficiaries): Under the UWIN platform approximately 15 crore household and 40 crore unorganised sector workers will be benefited who according to MoLE form the bottom level of the pyramid which will provide them with the pension plans, accidental insurance, maternity benefits, education to their children and all the other benefits that come under the social security schemes. As anticipated the workers and their families would be enrolled under the UWIN system where they will also get a chance to file grievances on a central toll-free number along with which the beneficiaries will be able to avail all the welfare benefits while migrating also.
- Workers facilitation center and field operations: The State government provides the option of choosing the mode/channel to register for the UWIN platform which includes door-to-door surveys and through the workers facilitation centers existing touchpoints such as CSC Village Level Entrepreneurs (VLE), Post Offices, NGO's etc. may be registered as WFCs or the State Government may choose to set up new agencies under the Department of Labour. Different field operators will be allotted for the door-to-door surveys who will help the workers to get registered under the UWIN Platform and also advice the workers on their eligibility regarding the schemes offered by the government. Also, through this UWIN platform the relevant documentation can be built, Aadhaar enrollment can be done, Aadhaar Virtual IDs can be created, and bank accounts can be opened.

== UWIN Architecture ==
- There are certain layers on which the UWIN platform stands.
  - Users: The Beneficiaries that are the unorganised sector workers and their families, the worker's facilitation centres or the field operators and the government departments of both the centre and the state will be the major users of the UWIN platform. Along with the other information that will be taken by the worker their bank account details will also be taken so that they are given the benefit of direct money transfers, the benefit given by the government through different social security schemes. These workers will be registered through the camps organized by the district administration, through workers facilitation centres by a web portal or a mobile app.
  - Locations: The UWIN application modules will be available to access through different locations like the work field, Workers facilitation centres, the offices of the Ministry of Labour and State departments across all the state users and different Ministries also.
  - Partners: Partners would be exposing open API for exchange of data such as authentication information (Aadhaar Information, NPCI, etc.). UWIN platform will also be exposing API's to be consumed by different platforms such as NCS, Employees state insurance ESIC, National security directives (NSDM), Employees' Provident Fund Organisation (EPFO), etc.
  - Data: This layer will have the database that is needed to drive the application and business services. It will be largely stored using the data management principles, and would utilize various technologies such as data security, data availability and data partitioning, which will ensure that data is secured and available to the right people and at the right time.
  - Infrastructure: This layer will be made of the operating systems, hypervisors, etc. to form the platform on which the upper layers would run. The infrastructure would be hosted on the cloud platform and will be procured by MoLE separately.
  - Business Services: These are abstract services offered to the beneficiaries using IT Applications and IT Application service/Open API layer.
  - Application Layer: The application layer is made of application services that will be used to offer business services. The application services are exposed by the presentation layer on the channels to offer the business services. The key applications exposed as application services/open API's are Beneficiary registration and validation module, BI/MIS Dashboards, User Management and Document Management System Module.
  - Communication Channels: The registered mobile numbers that were taken while collecting the information will be used to communicate regarding successful UWIN registrations and various other events. Also, the web portal will be used to communicate in the areas where there are proper connectivity issues and mobile applications will be used in the areas of the connectivity problems. All the collected data will be pushed to the UWIN cloud that is created especially for this platform. It is envisioned to have backend Aadhaar linkage to the UWIN number for the purpose of having an authenticated database. Individuals that have enrolled for Aadhaar but do not have Aadhaar number generated by UIDAI can provisionally enrol themselves with Aadhaar Enrolment ID (EID) and link the Aadhaar with their dataset at a later stage post which they will be assigned a UWIN number. IVR services can be used by the unorganised sector workers for the assistance required in the registration process.

== Scope of the work ==
- For the UWIN Platform, Socio Economic and Caste Census 2011 (SECC) shall be used as a base database. SECC-2011 is a study of socio-economic status of rural and urban households and allows ranking of households based on predefined parameters. SECC data is a compilation of 24 lakhs enumeration blocks where each enumeration block has roughly 125 households. These are the same enumeration blocks that were formed during census. SECC database captures Individual & Household Information ranging from Demographic details, Income, Employment and Ownership Profiles along with family linkages. The UWIN Database will use fields from the SECC database along with additional information provided by the unorganised worker during the registration and validation phase. Following data fields from SECC will be part of UWIN: 1. State Code 2. District Code 3. Sub District Code 4. Name of the person 5. Permanent Address 6. Gender 7. Date of Birth 8. Marital Status 9. Name of Father 10. Name of Mother 11. Occupation / Activity 12. Main Source of Income 13. Disability

== Overview of the UWIN platform ==
- The primary tenure of the UWIN contract is classified under three phases for creation and scaling, which the MSP (Managed Service Provider) for the UWIN platform shall require to manage various activities.
  - Immediate Requirement: Creation of UWIN Platform In Phase I, UWIN platform shall have the capability to register an unorganised worker, capture individual level and family details and generate a unique number UWIN. This shall lead to the creation of a national database of unorganised workers that has been Aadhaar seeded to avoid duplication. Phase I deliverables will primarily involve design and development of UWIN Portal and Application, help-desk setup and operations, support and maintenance of the UWIN Platform for Ministry of Labour and Employment.
  - Capabilities to be built-in for the future: Integration with other Databases Phase II of the project entails using the platform as an avenue for Scheme related services such as beneficiary enrollment, application processing, fund disbursement and policy level planning activities using the UWIN database created in Phase I. This phase shall also involve activities such as integration of UWIN databases with several other databases such as Scheme Databases, State Databases and so on.
  - Integration with NCS (National Career Service) and other portals Phase III of the project takes the Database integration one step further to integrate it with portals such as National Career Service Portal or Skill Development initiatives in order to facilitate skill mapping and targeted skill development initiatives. It shall also provide the opportunity to get inputs from the employers regarding skills in demand or information about employment opportunities.

== Defining the road map to move from various states and central systems to a single UWIN platform ==
- The MSP (Managed Service Provider) has prepared the road-map which comprises all the detailed activities with timelines involved in moving a single UWIN platform. This includes providing functionalities within UWIN to carry out three main tasks
  1. Registration of workers and generating a Unique UWIN ID linked to Aadhar and bank account numbers to be issued by States in 2015–16.
  2. Providing access of welfare schemes to registered worker through UWIN platform.
  3. Connecting potential employers to unorganised workers based on their skills and availability (Provision of functionality). The MSP (Managed Service Provider) teams are to be regularly involved in identifying opportunities and executing incremental steps aimed at improving performance, while reducing duplication of benefits and improved reliability of available data.
