= Shram Suvidha =

Shram Suvidha is a Web Portal to provide a single platform for all labour compliances.The Unified Shram Suvidha Portal is developed to facilitate reporting of Inspections, and submission of Returns. The Unified Shram Suvidha Portal has been envisaged as a single point of contact between employer and enforcement agencies bringing in transparency in their day-to-day interactions. For integration of data among various enforcement agencies, each inspectable unit under any Labour Law has been assigned one Labour Identification Number (LIN).

India has more than 40 labour laws regulated by the Ministry of Labour and Employment, the Government of India and State Government. Compliance with these laws is tedious and time-consuming. As a result, employers often do not comply. The scale of noncompliance exceeds the ability of enforcement agencies to regulate. Amidst the confusion, employees do not always receive what they are entitled to under these laws.

== Objectives ==
The primary objectives of Shram Suvidha are:

- A unified portal for all compliance pertaining to Chief Labour Commissioner of India, Director General Mines and Safety, Employee State Insurance Corporation, and Employee Provident Fund Organization. There are 16 laws that are covered here like Payment of Wages Act, Minimum Wages Act, Contract Labour (Abolition and Regulation) Act.
- Creation of a unique number known as the Labour Identification Number or LIN to supplement all other registration numbers such as PF Establishment Code, ESIC Registration Number, Contract Labour Registration Number, etc.
- Online servicing of notices from the labour department and online submission of answers with document.
- Employee grievances can now be received online and employer has to clear them and submit proof of clearance.

== Process ==
Shram Suvidha allows an organization to know what labour laws apply to it.

- The Act applies to all establishments where a specified number of employees are engaged in hazardous activities or manual labor.
- It covers a wide range of workers, including factory workers, construction workers, mill workers, domestic workers, and more.

Compliances are reportable in a single form that makes it simple for those filing such forms. Performance is monitored using key indicators thus making the evaluation process objective. It promotes the use of a common Labour Identification Number (LIN) by all Implementing agencies.
