= Industrial Relations Code, 2020 =

Act of Indian Parliament

Parliament of India
- Long title: An Act to consolidate and amend the laws relating to Trade Unions, conditions of employment in industrial establishment or undertaking, investigation and settlement of industrial disputes
- Citation: Act No. 35 of 2020 (PDF), archived from the original (PDF) on 29 September 2020
- Territorial extent: India
- Considered by: Parliament of India
- Enacted by: Lok Sabha
- Enacted: 22 September 2020
- Enacted by: Rajya Sabha
- Enacted: 23 September 2020
- Assented to: 28 September 2020
- Effective: 21 November 2025

Legislative history

Initiating chamber: Lok Sabha
- Introduced by: Santosh Gangwar; Minister of State (IC) Labour and Employment
- Introduced: 19 September 2020
- First reading: 22 September 2020
- Second reading: 23 September 2020
- Committee report: Report of Second National Commission on Labour

Repeals
- Trade Unions Act, 1926; Industrial Disputes Act, 1947; Industrial Employment (Standing Orders) Act, 1946
- Status: In force

The Industrial Relations Code, 2020 consolidates and amends the laws in India relating to trade unions, conditions of employment in industrial establishment or undertaking, investigation and settlement of industrial disputes. The code combines and simplifies three Central labour laws.

Industrial Relations Code, 2020 introduced more conditions for workers to strike, alongside an increase in the threshold relating to layoffs and retrenchment in industrial establishments having 300 workers from 100 workers to provide more flexibility to employers for hiring and firing workers without government permission.

The proposed legislation provides for a broader framework to protect the rights of workers to form unions, to minimise the friction between the employers and workers and to provide provisions for investigation and settlement of industrial disputes.

Industrial Relations Code amends the definition of "strike" to "mass casual leave". If over 50 per cent of a company's workers take concerted casual leave, it will be treated as a strike. However, workers cannot go on strike without a 14 days (not exceeding 60 days) notice.

The Lok Sabha passed the bill on 22 September 2020 and the Rajya Sabha passed it on 23 September 2020. It was assented by the President on 28 September 2020, and notified on 21 November 2025.

== Background ==
The bill was formulated according to the Report and Recommendations of the Second National Commission on Labour.

The Industrial Relations Code Bill, 2020 proposed for amalgamating, simplifying and rationalising the relevant provisions of three Acts.

- Trade Unions Act, 1926
- Industrial Employment (Standing Orders) Act, 1946
- Industrial Disputes Act, 1947

== See also ==
- Code on Wages, 2019
- Code on Social Security, 2020
- Occupational Safety, Health and Working Conditions Code, 2020
