= Bharat Forge Co. Ltd. v. Uttam Manohar Nakate =

Indian labour law

Bharat Forge Co Ltd v. Nakate
- Court: Supreme Court
- Citation: [2005] INSC 45

Keywords
- Labour, dismissal

Bharat Forge Co Ltd v. Uttam Manohar Nakate [2005] INSC 45 is an Indian labour law judicial decision concerning the dismissal of a worker who was found to be asleep in 1983. After 22 years, the Supreme Court of India upheld the dismissal of the employee in question.

== Facts ==
Uttam was a helper in Bharat Forge. He was found lying fast asleep on an iron plate in the corner of the department at 11:40 a.m. on 26 August 1983. This was the fourth time this had happened. After five months of disciplinary hearings, the company fired him in January 1984. Uttam went to court, which found the company guilty of "unfair labour practice" and forced the factory to take Uttam back and pay him 50 percent of his lost wages. The company appealed the decision before the Bombay High Court and eventually to the Supreme Court of India, reported as AIR 2005 SC 947.

== Judgment ==
In 2005 the Supreme Court came to the conclusion that the company had the right to fire him.

If the punishment is harsh, albeit a lesser punishment may be imposed, but such an order cannot be passed on an irrational or extraneous factor and certainly not on a compassionate ground. In Regional Manager, Rajasthan State Road Transport Corporation v Sohan Lal (2004) 8 SCC 218, it has been held that it is not the normal jurisdiction of the superior courts to interfere with the quantum of sentence unless it is wholly disproportionate to the misconduct proved. Such is not the case herein. In the facts and circumstances of the case and having regard to the past conduct of the Respondent as also his conduct during the domestic enquiry proceeding, we cannot say that the quantum of punishment imposed upon the Respondent was wholly disproportionate to his act of misconduct or otherwise arbitrary.

== Significance ==
Nakate's case is often used as an example of the problems with Indian labour law system of requiring government approval before dismissals can take effect.

Aside from highlighting the problem of India's lethargic legal system, Uttam's case dramatizes how the country's labor laws actually reduce employment, by making employers afraid to hire workers in the first place. The rules protect existing unionized workers -- sometimes referred to as the "labor aristocracy" -- at the expense of everyone else. At this point, the labor aristocracy comprises only 10 percent of the Indian work force.

— Gurcharan Das on the Foreign Affairs magazine.

The fact that we finally got a sound judgement shows we do have a system of checks and balances for those with the stamina to travel the course. But the more important point is why did our judges take 22 years to decide the set of appeals? How long, then, will our court system take to handle more complex issues? One reason investors hesitate to put their money into India is the problem of getting any dispute adjudicated and enforced in a reasonable time. Uttam's case shows those fears are very real. Worse, what does it say about our system's ability to deliver simple and swift justice to the average Indian?

— The Financial Express

== See also ==
- Indian labour law
- UK labour law
- Unfair dismissal
