= Unorganised Workers' Social Security Act, 2008 =

Unorganised Workers’ Social Security Act, 2008

Parliament of India
- Long title: An Act to provide for the social security and welfare of unorganised workers and for other matters connected therewith or incidental thereto.
- Citation: Act No. 33 of 2008
- Territorial extent: India
- Passed by: Rajya Sabha
- Passed: 23 October 2008
- Passed by: Lok Sabha
- Passed: 17 December 2008
- Assented to by: President
- Assented to: 30 December 2008
- Commenced: 16 May 2009
- Repealed: 3 May 2021

Legislative history

Initiating chamber: Rajya Sabha
- Bill title: Unorganised Sector Workers' Social Security Bill, 2007
- Bill citation: Bill No. LXVII of 2007
- Introduced by: Oscar Fernandes, Minister for Labour and Employment
- Introduced: 10 September 2007
- Committee responsible: Standing Committee
- Considered by the Standing Committee Committee: 20 September 2007
- Passed: 23 October 2008

Revising chamber: Lok Sabha
- Passed: 17 December 2008

Repealed by
- The Code on Social Security, 2020
- Status: Repealed

The Unorganised Workers' Social Security Act, 2008 was an Act of the Parliament of India enacted to provide for the social security and welfare of the unorganised workers (meaning home-based workers, self-employed workers or daily-wage workers). This act received the assent of the President of India on 30 December 2008. It is replaced by The Code on Social Security, 2020.

== Contents ==
The now-replaced act provided for the constitution of National Social Security Board at the Central level which shall recommend formulation of social security schemes viz life and disability cover, health and maternity benefits, old age protection and any other benefit as may be determined by the Government for unorganised workers. As a follow-up to the implementation of the Act, the National Social Security Board was set up on 18 August 2009.

== See also ==
- Indian labour law
- UK labour law
- US labor law
- German labour law
- European labour law
- Unorganised Workers' Identification Number
