= Maternity Benefit (Amendment) Act, 2017 =

Act of the Parliament of India

Parliament of India
- Long title: An Act further to amend the Maternity Benefit Act, 1961.
- Citation: Act No. 6 of 2017
- Passed by: Rajya Sabha
- Passed: 11 August 2016
- Passed by: Lok Sabha
- Passed: 9 March 2017
- Assented to: 27 March 2017
- Commenced: 1 April 2017

Legislative history

Initiating chamber: Rajya Sabha
- Bill title: The Maternity Benefit (Amendment) Bill, 2016
- Bill citation: Bill No. XLIII of 2016
- Introduced by: Bandaru Dattatreya, MoS(I/C) of the Ministry of Labour and Employment
- Introduced: 11 August 2016
- Passed: 11 August 2016

Revising chamber: Lok Sabha
- Passed with amendments: 9 March 2017

Final stages
- Lok Sabha amendments considered by the Rajya Sabha: 20 March 2017
- Finally passed both chambers: 20 March 2017

Amends
- Maternity Benefit Act, 1961 (53 of 1961)

Repealed by
- Repealing and Amending Act, 2025 (37 of 2025)
- Status: Repealed

The Maternity Benefit (Amendment) Act, 2017, an amendment to the Maternity Benefit Act, 1961, was passed in India's Rajya Sabha on 11 August 2016, in Lok Sabha on 9 March 2017, and received President's assent on 27 March 2017. The Maternity Benefit Act, 1961 protects the employment of the woman worker during the time of her maternity and entitles her of a 'maternity benefit' – i.e. full paid absence from work – to take care for her child. The Act is applicable to all establishments employing 10 or more persons in factories, mines, plantation, shops & establishments and other entities. Establishments employing 50 or more employees are also required to provide crèche facilities, either separately or along with common facilities within a prescribed distance.

The provisions of this act are effective from 1 April 2017. However, provision on creche facility (Section 11A) shall be effective from 1 July 2017. The Code on Social Security, 2020 consolidated the provisions of this and several other acts, repealing the acts in the process.

== Applicability ==
The Act was applicable to all establishments which include factories, mines, plantations, Government establishments, shops and establishments under the relevant applicable legislation, or any other establishment as may be notified by the Central Government.

== Eligibility ==
As per the Act, to be eligible for maternity benefit, a woman must have been working as an employee in an establishment for a period of at least 80 days within the past 12 months. Payment during the leave period is based on the average daily wage for the period of actual absence.

== Key amendments ==
- Increased Paid Maternity Leave:

The Maternity Benefit Amendment Act has increased the duration of paid maternity leave available for women employees from the existing 12 weeks to 26 weeks. Under the Maternity Benefit Amendment Act, this benefit could be availed by women for a period extending up to a maximum of eight weeks before the expected delivery date and the remaining time can be availed after childbirth. For women who are having two or more surviving children, the duration of paid maternity leave shall be 12 weeks (i.e. six weeks before and six weeks after expected date of delivery).

- Maternity leave for adoptive and commissioning mothers:

Maternity leave of 12 weeks to be available to mothers adopting a child below the age of three months from the date of adoption as well as to the "commissioning mothers". The commissioning mother has been defined as biological mother who uses her egg to create an embryo planted in any other woman.

- Work from Home option:

The Maternity Benefit Amendment Act has also introduced an enabling provision relating to "work from home" for women, which may be exercised after the expiry of the 26-week leave period. Depending upon the nature of work, women employees may be able to avail this benefit on terms that are mutually agreed with the employer.

- Creche facility:

The Maternity Benefit Amendment Act makes creche facility mandatory for every establishment employing 50 or more employees. Women employees would be permitted to visit the crèche four times during the day (including rest intervals) and where creche facilities are not available to women employees there should be two one-half hour rest periods.

The Maternity Benefit Amendment Act makes it mandatory for employers to educate women about the maternity benefits available to them at the time of their appointment.

== Criticism ==
- Gender discrimination against women having childbearing age:

Policy design is important and making such leave an employer mandate, as in India, ensures employers will discriminate against women of childbearing age. Additional requirements like creche facilities require more capital and operating expenditure. Some companies in India might shy away from hiring young women. When they do, the women might face a reduction in compensation as firms compensate for greater lifetime costs.

- Types of burden on the employer:

Employers have to bear the entire cost of providing leave to employees—in terms of both continued pay while on leave, as well as the indirect cost of having to get the work done by employing other workers to finish the work of the absent employee. Also, it increases the cost of temporary training provided to the employee which is employed on behalf of the absent employee.

- Women will lose their jobs:

Regarding how the bulk of employment is in the informal sector, Team-lease estimates, that 11-18 Lakh jobs for women will be lost because of the implementation of the Act, over the first four years.

- Financial burden only on employer:

In most countries, the cost of maternity leave is shared by the government, employer, insurance agency and other social security programs. In Singapore, for example, the employer bears the cost for eight weeks and public funds for eight weeks. In Australia and Canada, public funds bear the full cost. A social insurance scheme bears the cost in France. In Brazil, it shared by the employer, employee and the government.

An impact study done by Team-lease after 3 years, 5 out of 10 sectors that were expected to show more participation of women in workforce, rather indicated a drop in share of women in workforce.
