= Employees' Provident Fund Organisation =

Organisation of the Government of India

Employees Provident Fund Organisation

Organisation overview
- Formed: 4 March 1952
- Jurisdiction: India
- Headquarters: Plate A Ground Floor, Office Block-II, East Kidwai Nagar, New Delhi
- Organisation executive: Ramesh Krishnamurthi, CPFC
- Parent department: Ministry of Labour and Employment, Government of India
- Parent Organisation: Central Board of Trustees (CBT)
- Website: epfo.gov.in

The Employees' Provident Fund Organisation (EPFO) is one of the two main social security agencies under the Government of India's Ministry of Labour and Employment. The EPFO is responsible for regulation and management of provident funds in India, the other being Employees' State Insurance Corporation. The EPFO administers the retirement plan for employees in India, which comprises the mandatory provident fund for persons earning a wage below a pre-defined floor—the current ceiling for it is ₹25000 (~USD 263). For employees earning wages above the ceiling, it is optional to opt-in the scheme. However, the option can be exercised only once. If a person has opted-in to make contributions under the scheme, it is not possible to opt-out later. The employer has to contribute the same amount as the employee in case of a voluntary opt-in, with a cap of 12% of basic wage. The employees remain free to contribute more if they wish. Both the employer and employee must contribute to the EPF if the employee has opted-in. All firms employing 20 or more employees are mandated to be registered with the Fund.

EPFO also runs the basic pension scheme, along with insurance scheme for disability and death. It also manages social security agreements with other countries. International workers are covered under EPFO plans in countries where bilateral agreements have been signed. As of May 2021, 19 such agreements are in place. The EPFO's top decision-making body is the Central Board of Trustees (CBT), a statutory body established by the Employees' Provident Fund and Miscellaneous Provisions (EPF&MP) Act, 1952. The EPF&MP Act has now been replaced by the Code on Social Security, 2020. As of 2021, more than ₹15.6 lakh crore (US$209 billion) are under EPFO management. On 1 October 2014, the Government of India launched a Universal Account Number (UAN) for employees covered by EPFO to enable Provident Fund portability from one employer to another. With UAN, employees retain the same account while switching from one job to another, avoiding the duplicity of accounts that had been common before the reform.

== Origins ==
The Employees' Provident Fund Organisation (EPFO) is part of India's social security system, ensuring the financial security of employees. Operating under the jurisdiction of the Government of India's Ministry of Labour and Employment, the EPFO is entrusted with the regulation and oversight of provident funds in the nation, in conjunction with the Employees' State Insurance. It was established in 1951 through the enactment of the Employees' Provident Fund and Miscellaneous Provisions (EPF&MP) Act. The EPFO's responsibilities encompass the management of mandatory provident funds, fundamental pension schemes, disability and death insurance, as well as the facilitation of social security agreements with various international partners.

The first Provident Fund Act, passed in 1925 for regulating the provident funds of some private concerns, was limited in scope. In 1929, the Royal Commission on Labour stressed the need for creating provident funds for industrial workers. In the Indian Labour Conference held in 1948, it was generally agreed that the introduction of a statutory provident fund for industrial workers should be undertaken. The Coal Mines Provident Fund Scheme was launched in 1948. The success of this fund led to demand for its expansion to other industries.

The Constitution of India enacted in 1950 a non-justiciable directive that the State shall, within the limits of its economic capacity, make effective provisions for securing the right to work, to education and to public assistance in cases of unemployment, old-age, sickness & disablement and undeserved want. Accordingly, the last months of 1951 witnessed the promulgation of the Employees' Provident Funds Ordinance, which came into effect on 15 November 1951. It was later replaced by the Employees' Provident Funds Act. The Employees' Provident Funds Scheme, framed under Section 5 of the Act, was introduced in stages and came into force in its entirety by 1 November 1952. The cement, cigarette, electric, mechanical and general engineering products, iron, steel, paper, and textile industries were affected by the Act. The Acts and Schemes framed under it are administered by the Central Board of Trustees, which consists of representatives of Central and State governments, employers, and employees. The Board administers a contributory provident fund, pension scheme and an insurance scheme for the workforce engaged in the organised sector in India. The board is chaired by the Union Labour Minister of India.

The following three schemes are in operation under the Act:

1. Employees' Provident Fund Scheme, 1952
2. Employees' Deposit Linked Insurance Scheme, 1976
3. Employees' Pension Scheme, 1995 (replacing the Employees' Family Pension Scheme, 1971)

== Recent developments ==
In March 2022, the EPFO lowered the interest rate of 8.10% for the fiscal year of 2021-22.

On 30 August 2022, EPFO proposed to remove the restrictions on the wage ceiling and headcount to allow all formal workers and self-employed to enrol in its retirement saving schemes.

== Structure ==
The EPFO has the role of being the Law enforcement agency to oversee the implementation of the EPF&MP Act or the Social Security Code and also as a service provider for the covered beneficiaries throughout the country. The Act is administered by the Central Board of Trustees (informally, the CBT), which consists of a Chairman, a Vice-Chairman, 5 Central Government representatives, 15 State Government representatives, 10 Employees' representatives, 10 Employers' representatives with Central PF Commissioner and the Member Secretary to the Board. The CBT's Executive Committee is chosen from CBT members to assist the Central Board in the discharge of its functions related to administrative matters.

== Powers ==
The officers of the organisation in the Cadre of Commissioners are appointed by the Central Board under Section 5D for the efficient administration of the Act and Schemes. To this end, the commissioners of the organisation are vested with vast powers under the statute conferring quasi-judicial authority for the assessment of financial liability on the employer, search and seizure of records, levy of damages, admission of Oath, attachment and auction of a defaulter's property, prosecution and Arrest and Detention (confinement) of defaulters in civil prison etc, such measures are taken due to the fact that the collective savings money of employees may not be misappropriated by the employers or any other body which shall be considered a grave offence in the moral conscience of the nation.

== Hierarchy & Administration ==
Administratively, the organisation is divided into zones that are headed by an Additional Central Provident Fund Commissioner. Each zone has 4 or more Regional Offices which are headed by either Regional Provident Fund Commissioners (RPFC) (RPFC-I) or Regional Provident Fund Commissioners (RPFC-II). To assist them are Assistant Provident Fund Commissioners (APFCs) looking after the enforcement of the Act and Schemes. Many district offices have an APFC to implement the scheme and attend to grievances. At present, EPFO has 20 zonal offices, 149 regional offices, 113 district offices, 5 special state offices and 4 service centres across India.

The total manpower of the EPFO is at present more than 20,000 including all levels. The 1031 Commissioners are recruited directly and competitively through the Union Public Service Commission of India in Group 'A' cadre as well as through promotion from EO/AO. Enforcement Officers/Accounts Officers are also recruited directly by Union Public Service Commission (UPSC) in addition to promotion from the staff cadre of social security assistants which are hired by the Staff Selection Commission.

=== Pay Structure & Hierarchy ===
	Pay Grade in the Government of India	Designations	Sanctioned Strength
1	Pay Level 8	Enforcement Officer (EO) (Inspector)/Accounts Officer (AO)/Section Officer (SO) (Group-B)	NO DATA
2	Pay Level 10	Assistant Provident Fund Commissioner (APFC)/Assistant Director (AD)	455
3	Pay Level 11	Regional Provident Fund Commissioner-II (RPFC-II)/Deputy Director (DD)	302
4	Pay Level 12	Regional Provident Fund Commissioner-I (RPFC-I)/Director	240
5	Pay Level 13	Regional Provident Fund Commissioner-I (NFSG) (RPFC-I NFSG)	30% of Senior Duty Posts (Pay Level 11 & above)
6	Pay Level 13A	Additional Central Provident Fund Commissioner (Addl. CPFC)	32
7	Pay Level 14	Additional Central Provident Fund Commissioner Headquarters (Addl. CPFC HQ)/ Financial Advisor & Chief Accounts Officer (FA&CAO)/Chief Vigilance Officer (CVO)/ Director PDNASS	13
8	Pay Level 15	Central Provident Fund Commissioner (CPFC)	1

=== Universal Account Number ===
The Universal Account Number (UAN) is a 12-digit number allotted to employees who contribute to an EPF. A UAN is generated for each PF member by the EPFO. The UAN acts as an umbrella for the multiple Member IDs allotted to an individual by different establishments and remains the same throughout the lifetime of an employee. It does not change between jobs. The idea is to link multiple Member Identification Numbers (Member IDs) allotted to a single member under a single UAN. This will help the member to view details of all the Member Identification Numbers (Member ID) linked to it.

The major benefit of the UAN is convenience when tagging multiple Member IDs of a single employee. The UAN helps with transfer and withdrawals of PF claims, online or offline. Along with these services like the Online Pass-Book, SMS services on each deposit of contribution and online KYC updates can be provided based on the UAN, which enables transfer of the balance from one EPF to another.

A new (2018) UAN portal allows members to check EPF balances and UAN status, download a UAN EPF passbook, view a provident fund claim, etc.

Members who are unable to withdraw PF for any reason can withdraw without the consent of the employer. They can submit FORM 19 for EPF (Employees' Provident Fund) and FORM 10C for EPS (Employees' Pension Scheme) to the EPFO office in which their EPF account is maintained.

A UAN provided by EPFO is mainly used to track PF balance and PF claim status.

== Employees' Pension Scheme ==
The Employees' Pension Scheme (EPS) has been controlled by the EPFO since 1995. The main advantage of this scheme is to provide social security to PF members. Under this scheme, employees working in the organised sector can gain pension benefit after reaching age 58. This EPS applies to new and existing members.

The Scheme has been framed by the Central Government in accordance with the powers conferred by section 6A of the Employees’ Provident Funds and Miscellaneous Provisions (EPF and MP) Act, 1952. The EPS-95 came into force on 19.11.1995. Review and revision of schemes is an ongoing process. The provisions of the EPS-95 are reviewed from time to time based on the recommendations of the Expert Committee and the High Empowered Monitoring Committee as well as taking into account the actuarial evaluation of the Employees' Pension Fund. Some of the important amendments made in EPS-95 are:

- Increase in wage ceiling from ₹6,500 to ₹15,000 per month from 01 Sept 2014.
- Proposed increase in the statutory wage ceiling from ₹15,000 to ₹25,000 per month.
- Provision of a minimum pension of ₹1000 per month to the pensioners under EPS, 1995 from 01.09.2014 by providing additional budgetary support wherever the pension was falling short of ₹1000 as per pre-defined formula for calculation of pension.
- Restoration of normal pension after completion of fifteen years from the date of such commutation, in respect of those members who availed the benefit of commutation of pension under the erstwhile paragraph 12A of the EPS, 1995, on or before 25.09.2008 vide notification G.S.R.132(E) dated 20.02.2020.

== EPFO Death Relief Fund ==
The Employees’ Provident Fund Organisation (EPFO) has increased the ex-gratia amount under the Death Relief Fund for Central Board employees. From April 1, 2025, the amount will rise from ₹8.8 lakh to ₹15 lakh. This money will be given to the nominee or legal heirs of employees who pass away while in service, and it will be paid from the Staff Welfare Fund.

== Exemption for foreign workers ==
International workers are exempted if the worker holds a passport from a country with which India has signed a social security agreement and/or the member is contributing to a Social Security Program of the country with whom India has signed a Social Security Agreement.

Currently, India has entered into social security agreements with following countries:

Belgium	Germany	Switzerland	Brazil
Grand Duchy of Luxembourg	France	Denmark	Quebec
Republic of Korea	Netherlands	Hungary	
Finland	Sweden	Czech Republic	
Norway	Austria	Canada	
Australia	Japan	Portugal	

=== EPF wage components on international workers ===
As per the circular dated 25 May 2012 issued by the department, the wage components for the purpose of provident fund contributions in respect of international workers shall be determined in accordance with Paragraph 29 of the Employees’ Provident Fund Scheme, 1952. Under this provision, the applicable wages include basic wages, dearness allowance, retaining allowance, and the cash value of any food concession, while excluding house rent allowance and other specified allowances.

It is clarified that provident fund contributions are to be calculated only on these specified components and not on the gross wages of the employee. Even in instances where the employee’s monthly pay exceeds ₹15,000, the contribution remains payable without any upper ceiling, but strictly on the defined wage elements as per Paragraph 29, excluding all other components of gross pay.

== EPF calculation ==
Provident Fund is calculated 12% on the basic allowance plus the allowances received by all the employees across the board. The cap on the calculation of basic allowance is Rs. 15000. Further, the basic plus the allowances received by all employees across the board should be considered for calculation of EPF wages, not the gross wages for the calculation of EPF dues.

=== Principles laid down for allowances to be excluded ===
1. Allowances which are variable in nature;
2. Allowances which are linked to any incentive for production resulting in greater output by an employee; # Allowances which are not paid across the board to all employees in a particular category;
3. Allowance which are paid especially to those who avail the opportunity.

=== Percentage breakdown ===
EPFOF dues has two contributions. One is the employee’s contribution which is deducted from employee’s salary / wages and another is employer’s contribution which is to be paid by the employer every month. The employee’s contribution is 12% of the basic wage as per sec.2(b) of the act and employer’s share of contribution is also 12% of the basic wage as per sec.2(b) of the act. This is made up of 8.33% transfer to EPS (Employee Pension Scheme) and 3.67% transfer to EPF (Employee Provident Fund). Additionally the employer has to bear 0.50% as administrative charges on EPF and 0.50% as EDLI (employer’s Deposit linked Insurance) Charges. So the employer has to pay a total of 13% of the basic wage.

== Landmark judgements ==
=== APFC v/s M/s G4S Security Services (India) ===
Supreme Court of India vide Civil Appeal 9284 Of 2013 stated that the Basic Wage under EPF and MP Act, 1952 can not be equated with Minimum Wage under the Minimum Wages Act, 1948. Thus, the Minimum Wage can be bifurcated into Basic and House Rent Allowance; and EPF can only be paid on Basic only.

=== The Director, Centre for DNA Fingerprinting And Diagnostics, Uppal, Hyderabad v/s The Asst. Provident Fund Commissioner-II Compliance, Hyderabad & others ===
Telangana High Court vide WP 31702 of 2022 Delivered a Comprehensive Judgement over conducting proceedings under Section 7A of EPF & MP Act. Briefly, Hon'ble HC stated that every Commissioner must strictly comply with the instructions and guidelines stated in Circular by the department dated 14-02-2020, 01-10-2020 and 19-01-2021.

=== The Regional Provident Fund Commissioner (II) West Bengal vs Vivekananda Vidamandir And Others ===
Supreme Court of India vide above mentioned case stated that any of the allowances universally, necessarily and ordinarily paid to all across the board, such emoluments are basic wages and the employer should consider the same while deducting and remitting the EPF Dues. Hence, any allowance which is paid to every employee categorically will be covered under the purview of EPF.

=== Civicon Engineering Contracting India Pvt. Ltd. vs Central Board of Trustees & Ors ===
Delhi High Court stated that Central Provident Fund Commissioner (‘CPFC’) shall pass immediate practice directions in respect of uploading of all orders which are passed by the Regional Provident Fund Commissioners (RPFCs), Assistant Provident Fund Commissioners (APFC), Central Government Industrial Tribunal (CGIT) and any other officials/authorities who adjudicate disputes.

Hence, all orders must be made available under section 7A, 7B, 7Q and 14B on the Provident Fund's Website by the Department.

== See also ==
- 401(k)
- Roth IRA
- Retirement plans in the United States
- Individual retirement account
- Pensions in the United Kingdom
