= Industrial Disputes Act, 1947 =

Indian labour law

Central Legislative Assembly
- Long title: An Act to make provision for the investigation and settlement of industrial disputes, and for certain other purposes.
- Citation: Act No. 14 of 1947
- Enacted by: Central Legislative Assembly
- Enacted: 11 March 1947
- Assented to: 11 March 1947
- Commenced: 1 April 1947

Repealed by
- Industrial Relations Code, 2020
- Status: Repealed

The Industrial Disputes Act, 1947 (Act 14 of 1947) extended to the whole of India and regulated Indian labour law concerning trade unions as well as Individual workman employed in any industry within the territory of Indian mainland. Enacted on 11 March 1947, it came into force 1 April 1947. It was replaced by the Industrial Relations Code, 2020.

== Objectives ==
An act to make provision for the investigation and settlement of industrial disputes, and for certain other purposes. The objective of the Industrial Disputes Act is to secure industrial peace and harmony by providing mechanism and procedure for the investigation and settlement of industrial disputes by conciliation, arbitration and adjudication which is provided under the statute. The main and ultimate objective of this act is "Maintenance of Peaceful work culture in the Industry in India" which is clearly provided under the Statement of Objects & Reasons of the statute.

The laws apply only to the organised sector. Chapter V talks about the most important and often in news topic of 'Strikes and Lockouts'. It talks about the Regulation of strikes and lockouts and the proper procedure which is to be followed to make it a Legal instrument of 'Economic Coercion' either by the Employer or by the Workmen. Chapter V-B, introduced by an amendment in 1976, requires firms employing 300 or more workers to obtain government permission for layoffs, retrenchments and closures. A further amendment in 1982 (which took effect in 1984) expanded its ambit by reducing the threshold to 100 workers.

The Act also lays down:

1. The provision for payment of compensation to the workman on account of closure or lay off or retrenchment.
2. The procedure for prior permission of appropriate Government for laying off or retrenching the workers or closing down industrial establishments
3. Unfair labour practices on part of an employer or a trade union or workers.

== Applicability ==
The Industrial Disputes Act extends to whole of India and applies to every Industry and its various industrial establishment carrying on any business, trade, manufacture or distribution of goods and services irrespective of the number of workmen employed there in.

Every person employed in an establishment for hire or reward including contract labour, apprentices and part-time employees to do any manual, clerical, skilled, unskilled, technical, operational or supervisory work, is covered by the Act.

This Act though does not apply to persons mainly in managerial or administrative capacity, persons engaged in a supervisory capacity and drawing > 10,000 p.m or executing managerial functions and persons subject to Army Act, Air Force and Navy Act or those in police service or officer or employee of a prison.

=== Applicability to Parent Act ===
- Trades Dispute Act

=== Related Sections Of The Act ===
- Section 1 : Short title, and commencement

=== Important Definitions ===
- Section 2A : Appropriate Government

Any industry carried on by or under the authority of the Central Govt, or by a railway company or a Dock Labour Board, or the Industrial Finance Corporation of India Ltd, or the ESIC, or the board of trustees of the Coal Mines PF, or FCI, or LIC or in relation to any other industrial dispute, the state Government.

- Section 2J : Industry

The definition of Industry under the Act is taken from the Supreme Court's judgment in Bangalore water Supply and Sewerage Board v. A. Rajappa.

Triple Test formulae The organization is Prima Facie an industry if it is

1. A systematic activity

2. Organized by co-operation between an employer and an employee

3. for the production of goods and services calculated to satisfy human wants and wishes. (not spiritual or pious in nature but inclusive of material things or services geared to seek celestial bliss)

- Section 2BB: Banking company
- Section 2G : Employer
- Section 2J : Industry
- Section 2K : Industrial dispute
- Section 2A : Industrial dispute between individual and employer
- Section 2KA: Industrial establishment or undertaking
- Section 2KK: Insurance company
- Section 2LA: Major port
- Section 2LB: Mine
- Section 2N : Public utility service
- Section 2O : Railway Company
- Section 2RR: Wages
- Section 2S : Workmen (Including an Apprentice)industrial act

=== Related Schedules ===
- Schedule II - S7 : Matters Within The Jurisdiction Of Labour Courts
- Schedule III - S7A : Matters Within The Jurisdiction Of Industrial Tribunal
- Schedule IV - NOTICE OF CHANGE
- Schedule V - UNFAIR LABOUR PRACTICE

== See also ==
- Indian labour law
- UK labour law
- US labor law
- German labour law
- European labour law
