= Occupational Safety, Health and Working Conditions Code, 2020 =

Act of Indian Parliament

Occupational Safety, Health And Working Conditions Code, 2020

Parliament of India
- Long title: An Act to consolidate and amend the laws regulating the occupational safety, health and working conditions of the persons employed in an establishment.
- Citation: Act No. 37 of 2020 (PDF), archived from the original (PDF) on 29 September 2020
- Territorial extent: India
- Considered by: Parliament of India
- Enacted by: Lok Sabha
- Enacted: September 22, 2020
- Enacted by: Rajya Sabha
- Enacted: September 23, 2020
- Assented to: September 28, 2020
- Signed by: Ram Nath Kovind
- Effective: November 21, 2025

Legislative history

Initiating chamber: Lok Sabha
- Bill citation: No. 122 of 2020
- Introduced by: Santosh Gangwar; Minister of State (IC) Labour and Employment
- Introduced: September 19, 2020
- First reading: September 22, 2020
- Second reading: September 23, 2020
- Committee report: Report of Second National Commission on Labour

Repeals
- Factories Act, 1948; Plantations Labour Act, 1951; Mines Act, 1952; Working Journalists and other Newspaper Employees (Conditions of Service) and Miscellaneous Provisions Act, 1955; Working Journalists (Fixation of Rates of Wages) Act, 1958; Motor Transport Workers Act, 1961; Beedi and Cigar Workers (Conditions of Employment) Act, 1966; Contract Labour (Regulation and Abolition) Act, 1970; Sales Promotion Employees (Conditions of Service) Act, 1976; Inter-State Migrant Workmen (Regulation of Employment and Conditions of Service) Act, 1979; Cine-Workers and Cinema Theatre Workers (Regulation of Employment) Act, 1981; Dock Workers (Safety, Health and Welfare) Act, 1986; Building and Other Construction Workers (Regulation of Employment and Conditions of Service) Act, 1996
- Status: In force

The Occupational Safety, Health and Working Conditions Code, 2020 is a code to consolidate and amend the laws in India regulating the Occupational safety and health and working conditions of the persons employed in an establishment. The Act replaces 13 old central labour laws.

The bill was passed by the Lok Sabha on 22 September 2020, and the Rajya Sabha on 23 September 2020. The bill received the presidential assent on 28 September 2020, enforced on 21 November 2025.

== Background ==
The bill was formulated according to the Report and Recommendations of the Second National Commission on Labour.

It amalgamated The Factories Act, 1948, The Plantations Labour Act, 1951, The Mines Act, 1952, The Working Journalists and other Newspaper Employees (Conditions of Service and Miscellaneous Provisions) Act, 1955, The Working Journalists (Fixation of Rates of Wages) Act, 1958, The Motor Transport Workers Act, 1961, The Beedi and Cigar Workers (Conditions of Employment) Act, 1966, The Contract Labour (Regulation and Abolition) Act, 1970, The Sales Promotion Employees (Condition of Service) Act, 1976, The Inter-State Migrant workmen (Regulation of Employment and Conditions of Service) Act, 1979, The Cine Workers and Cinema Theatre Workers Act, 1981, The Dock Workers (Safety, Health and Welfare) Act, 1986 and The Building and Other Construction Workers (Regulation of Employment and Conditions of Service) Act, 1996.

== See also ==
- Code on Wages, 2019
- The Code on Social Security, 2020
- Industrial Relations Code, 2020
