= Code on Social Security, 2020 =

Act of Indian Parliament

Parliament of India
- Long title: An Act to amend and consolidate the laws relating to social security with the goal to extend social security to all employees and workers either in the organised or unorganised or any other sectors
- Citation: Act No. 36 of 2020
- Territorial extent: India
- Considered by: Parliament of India
- Enacted by: Lok Sabha
- Enacted: 22 September 2020
- Enacted by: Rajya Sabha
- Enacted: 23 September 2020
- Assented to: 28 September 2020
- Signed by: Ram Nath Kovind
- Commenced: 3 May 2021; 21 November 2025; Various sections came into force on different dates

Legislative history

Initiating chamber: Lok Sabha
- Bill citation: Bill No. 121 of 2020
- Introduced by: Santosh Gangwar; Minister of State (IC) Labour and Employment
- Introduced: 19 September 2020
- First reading: 22 September 2020
- Second reading: 23 September 2020
- Committee report: Report of Second National Commission on Labour

Repeals
- 1. Employees’ Compensation Act, 1923; 2. Employees’ State Insurance Act, 1948; 3. Employees’ Provident Funds and Miscellaneous Provisions Act, 1952; 4. Employment Exchanges (Compulsory Notification of Vacancies) Act, 1959; 5. Maternity Benefit Act, 1961; 6. Payment of Gratuity Act, 1972; 7. Cine Workers Welfare Fund Act, 1981; 8. Building and Other Construction Workers Welfare Cess Act, 1996; 9. Unorganised Workers' Social Security Act 2008
- Status: In force

The Code on Social Security, 2020 is a code in India to amend and consolidate the laws relating to social security with the goal to extend social security to all employees and workers either in the organised or unorganised or any other sectors.

The Social Security Code, 2020 brings unorganised sector, gig workers and platform workers under the ambit of social security schemes, including life insurance and disability insurance, health and maternity benefits, provident insurance, pension and skill upgradation, etc. The act amalgamates nine central labour enactments relating to social security.

== Background ==
The bill was introduced by the Labour Minister Santosh Gangwar. The bill was passed by the Lok Sabha 22 September 2020 and the Rajya Sabha on 23 September 2020. The bill was formulated according to the Report and Recommendations of the Second National Commission on Labour.

It consolidated The Employees’ Compensation Act, 1923, The Employees’ State Insurance Act, 1948, The Employees’ Provident Funds and Miscellaneous Provisions Act, 1952, The Employment Exchanges (Compulsory Notification of Vacancies) Act, 1959, The Maternity Benefit Act, 1961, The Payment of Gratuity Act, 1972, The Cine Workers Welfare Fund Act, 1981, The Building and Other Construction Workers Welfare Cess Act, 1996, Unorganised Workers' Social Security Act 2008.

The bill received the presidential assent on 28 September 2020, and section 142 of the Act has come into force on 3 May 2021. As per notification dated 3 May 2023 issued by Ministry of Labour and Employment, Government of India several sections of the code pertaining to Employees Pension Scheme and Employees Provident Fund Scheme came into force

== See also ==
- Code on Wages, 2019
- Industrial Relations Code, 2020
- Occupational Safety, Health and Working Conditions Code, 2020
