= Code on Wages, 2019 =

Act of the Parliament of India

Parliament of India
- Long title: An Act to amend and consolidate the laws relating to wages and bonus and matters connected therewith or incidental thereto.
- Citation: Act No. 29 of 2019
- Territorial extent: India
- Passed by: Lok Sabha
- Passed: 30 July 2019
- Passed by: Rajya Sabha
- Passed: 2 August 2019
- Assented to: 8 August 2019
- Commenced: 18 December 2020

Legislative history

Initiating chamber: Lok Sabha
- Bill title: The Code on Wages Bill, 2019
- Bill citation: Bill No. 184 of 2019
- Introduced by: Santosh Gangwar
- Introduced: 23 July 2019
- Committee report: Report of the Parliamentary Standing Committee

Final stages
- Reported from conference committee: 18 December 2018

Repeals
- Payment of Wages Act, 1936; Minimum Wages Act, 1948; Payment of Bonus Act, 1965; Equal Remuneration Act, 1976
- Status: In force

The Code on Wages, 2019, also known as the Wage Code, is an Act of the Parliament of India that consolidates the provisions of four labour laws concerning wage and bonus payments and makes universal the provisions for minimum wages and timely payment of wages for all workers in India. The Code repeals and replaces the Payment of Wages Act, 1936, the Minimum Wages Act, 1948, the Payment of Bonus Act, 1965, and the Equal Remuneration Act, 1976.

== Background ==
The Narendra Modi administration began considering a plan in 2015 to consolidate India's 44 labour laws into four codes in order to rationalize labour laws and improve the ease of doing business. Finance Minister Nirmala Sitharaman stated in her 2019 Union Budget speech, "This will ensure that [the] process of registration and filing of returns will get standardised and streamlined. With various labour-related definitions being standardised, it is expected that disputes will reduce." The Code on Wages is the first of the proposed codes. The other three are the Occupational Safety, Health and Working Conditions Code, the Industrial Relations Code, and the Code on Social Security, which have been passed in 2020 but not yet come into force because the date of coming into force is yet to be notified in the official gazette. It also extends the provisions of minimum wages and timely payment of wages to employees in both organised and unorganised sectors.

== Legislative history ==
The Code on Wages Bill was introduced in the Lok Sabha on 10 August 2017 by the Minister of State for Labour and Employment (Independent Charge), Santosh Gangwar. The bill was referred to a Parliamentary Standing Committee on 21 August 2017. The Committee submitted its report on 18 December 2018. The committee made 24 recommendations, of which 17 were incorporated into the bill. The bill lapsed following the dissolution of the 16th Lok Sabha ahead of the 2019 general elections. The Code on Wages Bill, 2019 was re-introduced in the House on 23 July 2019.

Moving the bill for consideration, Gangwar stated that the government had held consultations with trade unions, employers and State governments, and held tripartite consultations on 10 March 2015 and 13 April 2015. He also stated that a draft of the bill was made available on the Ministry of Labour and Employment's website and suggestions from the general public were taken into account. Gangwar added that existing labour laws only governed payment of wages for about 40% of the labour force and the Code on Wages would extend coverage to the entire labour force irrespective of sector or wage ceiling. He noted that provisions on timely payment of wages would bring relief to workers in the unorganized sector of the economy. The bill was passed by the Lok Sabha on 30 July 2019.

The bill was passed by the Rajya Sabha on 2 August 2019. The bill received assent from President Ram Nath Kovind on 8 August, and was notified in The Gazette of India on the same date.

The Union Ministry of Labour issued draft rules under section 67 of the Act on 7 July 2020 in the Gazette. The draft rules remained open for public feedback for 45 days and are expected to come into force soon. Some provisions of the Act have come into force on 18 December 2020. The bill has received the presidential assent on 8 August 2019 and notified on 21 November 2025.

== See also ==
- Code on Social Security, 2020
- Industrial Relations Code, 2020
- Occupational Safety, Health and Working Conditions Code, 2020
