= Minimum Wages Act, 1948 =

Act of Parliament about Indian labour law

Parliament of India
- Long title: An Act to provide for fixing minimum rates of wages in certain employments.
- Citation: Act No. 11 of 1948
- Enacted by: Parliament of India
- Commenced: 15 March 1948

Repealed by
- Code on Wages, 2019
- Status: Repealed

The Minimum Wages Act, 1948 was an act of parliament concerning Indian labour law that sets the minimum wages that must be paid to skilled and unskilled workers. It has been repealed and replaced by The Code on Wages, 2019.

The Indian Constitution has defined a 'living wage' that is the level of income for a worker which will ensure a basic standard of living including good health, dignity, comfort, education and provide for any contingency. However, to keep in mind an industry's capacity to pay the Constitution has defined a 'fair wage'. Fair wage is that level of wage that not just maintains a level of employment, but seeks to increase it, keeping in perspective the industry's capacity to pay. Due to an unjust attention towards the decades-old law it is now exploited by major businesses to underpay their employees, In public opinion government must set a yearly wage change just like countries internationally do.

To achieve this in its first session during November 1948, the Central Advisory Council appointed a Tripartite Committee of Fair Wage. This committee came up with the concept of a minimum wage, which not only guarantees bare subsistence and preserves efficiency but also provides for education, medical requirements and some level of comfort.

India introduced the Minimum Wages Act in 1948, giving both the Central government and State government jurisdiction in fixing wages. The act is legally non-binding, but statutory. Payment of wages below the minimum wage rate amounts to forced labour. Wage boards are set up to review the industry's capacity to pay and fix minimum wages such that they at least cover a family of four's requirements of calories, shelter, clothing, education, medical assistance, and entertainment. Under the law, wage rates in scheduled employments differ across states, sectors, skills, regions and occupations owing to difference in costs of living, regional industries' capacity to pay, consumption patterns, etc. Hence, there is no single uniform minimum wage rate across the country and the structure has become overly complex. The highest minimum wage rate as updated in 2012 was Rs. 322/day in Andaman and Nicobar and the lowest was Rs. 38/day in Tripura. In Mumbai, as of 2017, the minimum wage was Rs. 348/day for a safai karmachari (sewage cleaner and sweeper), but this was rarely paid.

== History ==
1920: K.G.R. Choudhary recommended setting up boards for determining minimum wages for each industry.

1928: International Labour Conference implemented system to fix wages for different trades. However, the practice was not put into legislation in India.

1943: Standing Labour Committee, a Labour Investigation Committee was appointed on the recommendation of Indian Labour Conference (ILC), 1943 to look into conditions of labour in terms of their wages, housing, social conditions, and employment.

1945: The first bill on minimum wages was drafted in ILC.

1946: A bill on minimum wages was introduced in Central Legislative assembly on the recommendations of 8th Standing Labour Committee. The 8th meeting of the Standing Labour Committee, 1946 also recommended that a separate legislation that specified working hours, minimum wages and paid holidays of unorganised sector be enacted.

1947: Post-independence representatives of labour, employers, and government attended a government-organised conference. They defined minimum wages to be such that they should not only provide for subsistence but should also be enough for education, medical requirements and other amenities and should sustain efficiency.

1948: The Minimum Wages Act was eventually passed and was effective from 15 March. Under the act a tripartite committee "The Tripartite Committee of Fair Wage" was appointed that set definitions and guidelines for formulating a wage structure in India. The Committee of fair wage definition of minimum wage as: "The minimum wages must be provided not merely for the bare subsistence of life but also for the preservation of efficiency of the workers by providing for some measures of education, medical requirement and amenities". Recommendations of this committee have now set the foundations of wage fixation.

1957: The 15th Labor conference added some norms in the fixation of minimum wages such that revision and fixation of wage rates are need-based. The recommendations were:

- The cost of three consumption units- husband, wife and two children for one earner. Income from women and children should be ignored
- Satisfy the minimum food requirement of 2700 calories per person
- Clothing requirement of 72 yards for a family annually
- Rent of the minimum area as specified by Government's Industrial Housing Scheme
- 20% of minimum wage should be the cost of fuel and miscellaneous items of expenditure

1987: Parliamentary sub-committee on unorganised labour concluded that minimum wages fail to ensure a livelihood above the government defined poverty line for the unorganised sector. It also revealed some flaws in implementation of the act. The committee noted that wages are not fixed or revised regularly in some states. The committee recommended that factors such as nutrition requirements, poverty line, shelter, clothing, fuel, light, medical and educational expenses should be taken into account while fixing and revising minimum wages.

1988: Labour Minister's Conference recommend the necessity of an allowance that safeguards wages against inflation, called Variable Dearness Allowance (VDA).

1991: Hon’ble Supreme court's judgment in the case of Reptakas & Co. specified that 25% of the minimum wages should also account for Children's education, required medical expenses, recreation in festivals/ceremonies and provision for old age and marriage. National Commission on Rural Labour (NCRL) recommended the government to introduce a national minimum wage floor level for uniformity.

VDA became effective. It is revised twice in a year, on 1 April and 1 October.

1992: Thirtieth session of ILC observed the ineffectiveness of states' implementation machinery and labour administration. It urged the civil society especially NGOs and workers' organisations to inspect and ensure payment of minimum wages. The thirtieth session also discussed that officials should be wary of fixing minimum wage rates to impracticable high levels.

1994: The 9th Centre of Indian Trade Unions conference along with insisting a minimum wage floor of Rs. 78.50, raised the following demands

- The family should be taken as five units instead of three.
- The Minimum Wages Act should cover all employments.
- There should be full neutralisation of cost of living with automatic linkage with the consumer prices index and revision after every six months or 50-point rise in the CPI, whichever is earlier.

1996: Government fixed the national minimum wage floor at INR 35/day as per the recommendations of NCRL. Since 2009 it stands at INR 100/day.

2007: The Tamil Nadu state government announced that it has fixed minimum wages for 90% of all occupations.

The Indian National Trade Union Congress appeals for a "national decent minimum wage" for all industries that would be based on workers' needs.

2008: Working Women in Houses Union marched in Salem demanding statutory fixation of minimum wages for house maids and servants.

2009: The Central government de-linked MGNREGA's wage rates from minimum wages through notification under Section 6(1). Wage rates that were initially aligned with respective states' minimum wages were now fixed at a uniform wage rate of Rs. 100/- under the scheme.

On 12 August, the Andhra Pradesh wrote to the Ministry of Rural Development that workers under the MGNREGA scheme are being paid less than the Minimum wage rate and this could attract "contempt of court". There was no response to this.

On 10 July, the Labour Department responded to the notification of wage rate in MGNREGA scheme as against the minimum wage rate: "Minimum Wages Act, 1948 guarantees minimum wages to workers and there cannot be a wage rate less than the minimum wage rate in any circumstances."

2010: Andhra Pradesh's government says that any payment including that under the MGNREGA scheme, below minimum wage rate is unconstitutional.

2011: As per Karnataka High Court's interim order MGNREGA's wage rates are to be aligned with the Minimum Wage rates of the state.

National Human Right Commission convened a zonal workshop on fixation, revision and enforcement of minimum wage is Brick kiln industry.

2012: Mazdoor Kisan Shakti Sangathan urges the Supreme Court to withdraw the SLP to the PM to rediscuss Karnataka High Court and Andhra Pradesh high Court's judgments

Supreme Court asks the Central Government to consider respective states' minimum wages to bring parity between them.

The Labour Department decides to make revisions in minimum wage rates mandatory within three years.

2015: From 1 July 2015 the National Floor Level of Minimum Wage was raised to Rs 160 per day.

2015: On 1 September 2015 labours in unorganised sector extended their support to one-day nationwide general strike called by central trade unions (CTUs). Later than Shri Bandaru Dattatreya, the Minister of State(IC) for Labour and Employment, elaborated on the initiatives and continuing efforts of the Government to address the issues and concerns of the Trade Unions for the welfare of workers. If the norms are implemented then the minimum wage would be not less than Rs 273 per day which is currently Rs 160 per day.

2019: The Parliament of India passed the Code on Wages, 2019, which was notified on August 8, 2019. This new code is designed to amalgamate, simplify, and rationalize four central labour enactments: the Minimum Wages Act, 1948, the Payment of Wages Act, 1936, the Payment of Bonus Act, 1965, and the Equal Remuneration Act, 1976. A key feature of the new code is the introduction of a national floor wage to be set by the central government. State governments cannot fix minimum wages below this national benchmark, which aims to create more uniformity and reduce regional disparities in wages.

== Contents ==
The Act provides for fixing wage rate (time, piece, guaranteed time, overtime) for any industry .

1) While fixing hours for a normal working day as per the act should make sure of the following:

- The number of hours that are to be fixed for a normal working day should have one or more intervals/breaks included.
- At least one day off from an entire week should be given to the employee for rest.
- Payment for the day decided to be given for rest should be paid at a rate not less than the overtime rate.

2) If an employee is involved in work that categorises his service in two or more scheduled employments, the employee's wage will include respective wage rate of all work for the number of hours dedicated at each task.

3) It is mandatory for the employer to maintain records of all employee's work, wages and receipts .

4) Appropriate governments will define and assign the task of inspection and appoint inspectors for the same.

=== Fixation and revision of minimum wages ===
The Minimum Wages Act 1948 generally specifies minimum wage rates on a per day basis, and extends to the entire country and is revised within a period of not less than five years, however there is a provision to increase dearness allowance every two years. The norms in fixing and revision of minimum wages were first recommended by ILC, 1957.

Revision of minimum wage rates is based on a 'cost of living index' and wages can be fixed for an entire state, part of the state, class or classes and employments pertaining to these categories. The fixation of wages is based on the norms mentioned and a wage board (different for different industry).

Under the Minimum Wages Act, State and Central Governments have the power to fix and revise minimum wages. The act specifies that the "appropriate" government should fix the wages i.e. if the wages to be fixed are in relation to any authority of Central government or Railway administration then the Central government fixes it. However, if the wage rate is to be fixed or revised for a scheduled employment, the respective state governments fix it. The Centre fixes the National floor level Minimum Wage that is lower than most states' respective minimum wages. The ambiguity and overlap in the jurisdiction of both these tiers of government have caused debates and controversies. One of such debates revolves around fixing wage rates of MGNREGA scheme, an employment guarantee initiative by the Central Government

As per Section 5 of the Minimum Wages Act, 1948, there are two ways of fixing and/or revising minimum wages • Committee Method: Committees and Sub-committees are set up to make recommendations or create inquiries. • Notification Method: The government publishes proposals and an official date in the Official Gazette. All advice and recommendations form various committees and sub-committees as well as representations are collected before the specified official date and the government then proceeds to fix/revise minimum wages.

=== Exclusions ===
- Workers: Wages to disabled people and those payable to a dependent family member of the employer
- Industries: Un-scheduled industries are generally excluded. For every revision of minimum wages, a state can add a minimum wage for an occupation or specify it for a sector.

=== Enforcement ===
The Central Government is the proper authority for enforcement of the act. Schedule employment is carried under the railway administration, mines, oilfield, major port and corporation established by Central Act. Chief Labour Commissioner is charged under central level, and at state level officers in industrial relations are charged for enforcement act and other labour laws.

=== Offences and penalties ===
Violation of the act in regards to minimum wages, working hours and other comes under Central Act as offences, and there is a penalties of 6months imprisonment and fine of Rs. 500/- (under section act 22). Any agreement whereby an employee reduces his right under this act shall be null and void.

=== Process of complaints ===
To process complaints the appropriate government can appoint a labour commissioner, Commissioner for Workmen's Compensation, or officer with experience as a judge of Stipendiary Magistrate or an officer that is at least above the rank of Labour Commissioner. If an individual feels that he/she is being paid less than the minimum wages specified for his region/sector/occupation, or is not paid for a duration of work, a complaint can be made to the appointed authority.

== Minimum wage rates ==
The table below summarizes minimum wages across states. All states specify different minimum wages for different occupations and skill levels within those occupations. The table below briefly shows if the states account for Variable Dearness Allowance (VDA) that are linked and fixed according to average Consumer Price Index for Industrial Workers, the range of minimum wages, and when these wages were last updated/revised. The period within which minimum wages are revised is different for different states. Some states revise their respective minimum wage rates every six months while some do so in five years.

- Variable Dearness Allowance and Basic Rates for the employees employed in Agriculture w.e.f. 01.10.2020
  - Rates of V.D.A.

Category of worker	Rates of V.D.A. Area wise per day (in Rupees)		
	'A'	'B'	'C'
Unskilled	74	68	68
Semi-Skilled / Unskilled Supervisor	81	74	68
Skilled Clerical	88	81	74
Highly Skilled	97	90	81

The minimum rates of wages including the basic rates and Variable Dearness Allowance payable w.e.f. 01.10.2020 to the employees working in Agriculture shall be as under

- Variable Dearness Allowance and Basic Rates for Industrial Workers w.e.f. 01.10.2020 for employees employed in employments in Gypsum Mines, Barytes Mines, Bauxite Mines, Manganese Mines, China Clay Mines, Kyanite Mines, Copper Mines, Clay Mines, Magnesite Mines, White Clay Mines, Stone Mines, 8teatite Minee (including the mines producing Soap Stores and TalcJ, Ochre Mines, Asbestos Mines, Pire Clay Mines, Chromite Mines, Quartzite Mines, Quartz Mines, Silica Mines, Graphite Mines, Felspar Mines, Laterite Mines, Dolomite Mines, Red Oxide Mines, Wolfram Mines Iron Ore Mines, Granite Mines Rock Phosphate Mines, Hematite Mines, marble and Calcite Mines, Uranium Mines, Mica Mines, Lignite Mines, Gravel Mines, Slate Mines and Magnetite Mines.
  - Rates of V.D.A.

Category of worker	Rates of V.D.A. (in Rupees) Per Day
	For work above ground	For work below ground
Unskilled	77	97
Semi-Skilled / Unskilled Supervisor	97	116
Skilled Clerical	116	135
Highly Skilled	135	149

- The minimum rates of wages showing the basic rates and Variable Dearness Allowance Payable w.e.f. 01.10.2020 will be as under:-

Category of worker	Rates of wages including V.D.A. (in Rupees) Per Day	
	For work above ground	For work below ground
Unskilled	350+77=427	437+97= 534
Semi-Skilled / Unskilled Supervisor	437+97=534	523+ 116=639
Skilled Clerical	523+ 116=639	610+ 135=745
Highly Skilled	610+ 135=745	683+ 149=832

- Variable Dearness Allowance and Basic Rates for Industrial Workers w.e.f. 01.10.2020 for employees employed in construction or maintenance of roads or runways or in building operations including laying down underground electric, wireless, radio, television, telephone, telegraph and overseas communication cables and similar other underground cabling work, electric lines, water supply lines and sewerage pipe lines
  - Rates of V.D.A.

Category of worker	Rates of wages including V.D.A. Area wise per day (in Rupees)		
	'A'	'B'	'C'
Unskilled	116	97	77
Semi-Skilled / Unskilled Supervisor	128	109	90
Skilled Clerical	140	128	109
Highly Skilled	152	140	128

- The minimum rates of wages showing the Basic Rates and Variable Dearness Allowance Payable w.e.f. 01.10.2020 will be as under:-

Category of worker	Rates of wages including V.D.A. Area wise per day (in Rupees)		
	'A'	'B'	'C'
Unskilled	523+116=639	437+97=534	350+77=427
Semi-Skilled / Unskilled Supervisor	579+128=707	494+109=603	410+90=500
Skilled Clerical	637+140=777	579+128=707	494+109=603
Highly Skilled	693+152=845	637+140=777	579+128=707

- Variable Dearness Allowance and Basic Rates for Industrial Workers w.e.f. 01.10.2020 for employees employed in loading and unloading in (i) goods sheds, parcel offices of railways, (ii) other goods-sheds, godowns, warehouses and other similar employments; (iii) docks and ports; and (iv) passengers goods and cargo carried out at airports (both international and domestic).
  - Rates of V.D.A.

AREA	RATES OF V.D.A. PER DAY (IN RS.)
'A'	116
'B'	97
'C'	77

- The minimum rates of wages showing the basic rates and Variable Dearness Allowance payable w.e.f. 01.10.2020 shall be as under:-

AREA	RATES OF wages plus V.D.A. PER DAY (IN RS.)
'A'	523+116=639
'B'	437+97=534
'C'	350+77=427

- Variable Dearness Allowance and Basic Rates for Industrial Workers w.e.f. 01.10.2020 for employees employed In "employment of sweeping and cleaning excluding activities prohibited under the employment of manual scavengers and construction of dry latrines (prohibition) act, 1993".
  - Rates of V.D.A.

AREA	RATES OF V.D.A. PER DAY (IN RS.)
'A'	116
'B'	97
'C'	77

- The minimum rates of wages showing the Basic Rates and variable Dearness Allowance payable w.e.f. 01.10.2020 shall be as under:-

AREA	RATES OF wages plus V.D.A. PER DAY (IN RS.)
'A'	523+116=639
'B'	437+97=534
'C'	350+77=427

- The minimum rates of wages showing the Basic Rates and Variable Dearness Allowance for Industrial Workers payable w.e.f. 01.10.2020 to employees employed in WATCH AND WARD (without arms) shall be as under:-

AREA	RATES OF wages plus V.D.A. PER DAY (IN RS.)
'A'	637+140=777
'B'	579+128=707
'C'	494+109=603

- The minimum rates of wages showing the Basic Rates and Variable Dearness Allowance for Industrial Workers payable w.e.f. 01.10.2020 to employees employed in WATCH AND WARD (with arms) shall be as under:-

AREA	RATES OF wages plus V.D.A. PER DAY (IN RS.)
'A'	693+152=845
'B'	637+140=777
'C'	579+128=707

- The minimum piece rate wages showing the Basic and Variable Dearness Allowance for Industrial Workers payable w.e.f. 01.10.2020 to the employees employed in Store Mines shall be as under:-

Category	Basic wages plus V.D.A (IN RS.)
Excavation & removal of over burden with 50 meters Lead / 1.5 Meters lift. *: 1. Soft Soil; 2. Soft Soil with Rock; 3. Rock	351+80=431 531+117=648 703+155=858
Removal and stacking of rejected stones with 50 meters lead/1.5 meters lift. *	283+63=346
Stone Breaking or Stone Crushing for Stone Size of Category**: 1. 1.0 inch to 1.5 inches; 2. Above 1.5 inches to 3.0 inches; 3. Above 3.0 inches to 5.0 inches; 4. Above 5.0 inches	2171+471=2642 1857+403=2260 1088+238=1326 893+196=1089

The workers employed on minimum guaranteed time rate of wages per day shall be entitled to time rate of minimum wages plus special allowance, if any, for unskilled category of above ground workers revised from time to time by the Central Government in respect of scheduled employment in stone mines.

* Per 2.831 cube meters (100 cubic feet)

** Per truck load of 5.662 cubic meters (200 cubic feet)

- CLASSIFICATION OF AREA

AREA – "A"
Ahmedabad	(UA)	Hyderabad	(UA)	Faridabad complex			
Bangaluru	(UA)	Kanpur	(UA)	Ghaziabad			
Kolkata	(UA)	Lucknow	(UA)	Gurgaon			
Delhi	(UA)	Chennai	(UA)	Noida			
Greater Mumbai	(UA)	Nagpur	(UA)	Secunderabad			
Navi Mumbai		Pune	(UA)				
AREA – "B"
Agra	(UA)	Gwalior	(UA)	Port Blair	(UA)		
Ajmer	(UA)	Hubli-Dharwad	(M. Corpn)	Puducherry	(UA)		
Aligarh	(UA)	Indore	(UA)	Raipur	(UA)		
Allahabad	(UA)	Jabalpur	(UA)	Raurkela	(UA)		
Amravati	(M.Corpn)	Jaipur	(M.Corpn)	Rajkot	(UA)		
Amritsar	(UA)	Jalandhar	(UA)	Ranchi	(UA)		
Asansol	(UA)	Jalandhar-Cantt.	(UA)	Saharanpur	(M.Corpn)		
Aurangabad	(UA)	Jammu	(UA)	Salem	(UA)		
Bareilly	(UA)	Jamnagar	(UA)	Sangli	(UA)		
Belgaum	(UA)	Jamshedpur	(UA)	Shillong			
Bhavnagar	(UA)	Jhansi	(UA)	Siliguri	(UA)		
Bhiwandi	(UA)	Jodhpur	(UA)	Solapur	(M.Corpn)		
Bhopal	(UA)	Kannur	(UA)	Srikakulam	(UA)	Srinagar	(UA)
Bhubaneshwar	(UA)	Kochi	(UA)	Surat	(UA)		
Bikaner	(M.Corpn)	Kolhapur	(UA)	Thiruvananthapuram	(UA)		
Bokaro Steel City	(UA)	Kollam	(UA)	Thrissur	(UA)		
Chandigarh	(UA)	Kota	(M.Corpn)	Tiruchirappalli	(UA)		
Coimbatore	(UA)	Kozhikode	(UA)	Tiruppur	(UA)		
Cuttack	(UA)	Ludhiana	(M.Corpn)	Ujjain	(M.Corpn)		
Darbhanga	(UA)	Dehradun	(UA)	Madurai	(UA)	Vadodara	(UA)
Dhanbad	(UA)	Malappuram	(UA)	Varanasi	(UA)		
Durgapur	(UA)	Malegaon	(UA)	Vasai- Virar City	(M.Corpn)		
Durg-Bhilai Nagar	(UA)	Mangalore	(UA)	Vijayawada	(UA)		
Erode	(UA)	Meerut	(UA)	Vishakhapatnam	(M.Corpn)		
Firozabad		Moradabad	(M. Corpn)	Warangal	(UA)		
Goa		Mysore	(UA)	Gorakhpur	(UA)		
NandedWaghala	(M. Corpn)	GreaterVisakhapatnam	(M.Corpn)	Nasik	(UA)		
Gulbarga	(UA)	Nellore	(UA)	Guntur	(UA)		
Panchkula	(UA)	Guwahati	(UA)	Patna	(UA)		
Area 'C' will comprise all areas not mentioned in this list. NB: U.A. stands for Urban Agglomeration.

== Issues ==
42% of all wage earners in India receive wages below the national minimum wage floor rate. The data used for these statistics includes half of casual labourers and 1/4th of those salaried. Female workers and those in rural areas are more likely to be paid below a minimum wage. Those who are illiterate or have no mid-level education are most likely to be paid below a minimum wage. For Salaried workers, if they are employed in agriculture, it is more likely that they are paid higher than the minimum wage. Whereas casual workers in construction and unorganised workers in production and manufacturing are likely to receive wages at the minimum wage rate. In sum, the implementation and enforcement of minimum wages is dismal and marginalised groups and communities suffer the most. The government has announced that many amendments are underway to improve enforcement such as penal action against violations and mandatory revision of minimum wages every 5 years.

- Large unemployment: Ensuring a payment at the minimum wage rate does not ensure employability to a willing worker. Many workers out of desperation then accept a wage below the minimum wage. Workers are too weak and vulnerable to demand their rights and after liberalisation, collective rights to have grown weaker with decreasing power of trade unions. These two factors combined give the employer the capacity to offer employment at wages below the minimum wage rate. There have also been cases where workers are paid wages below the minimum wage floor in government funded road and construction projects.
- Less protection against inflation: Real minimum wage rates may decline in the face of accelerating inflation for three main reasons. Firstly, wages are not revised as frequently as prescribed in the norms i.e. not more than five years. In fact it is believed that revision every three years and even alternate years not only to help workers from increasing costs of living but also to improve supervision of the act. Secondly, many states do not provide for dearness allowance, a safeguard against inflation and finally minimum wages are not linked to a cost of living index.
- Exemptions from payment of minimum wages: Government projects have been known to resort to various channels for paying wages below the minimum wage rate. They use methods such as special notifications and exemption clause (26-2) of the Minimum Wages Act. The parliamentary sub-committee, 1987 noted that wages of government programs such as NREP and RLEGP were below the prescribed minimum wage rate. Many professions and industries do not fall under the coverage of the act, for the simple reason that no minimum wage has yet been prescribed, hence employers pay wages on their own discretion.
- Lack of awareness: Many citizens are not aware of the existence of a statutory provision that ensures a minimum wage rate. "80% of workers earn less than INR 20/day or less than half of government stipulated minimum wage rate (rural INR 49 and urban INR 67)”. On certain instances of doubt among workers on existence of a minimum wage rate, officials have denied claims of any statutory act or legislation.
- Delays and inaction: There are delays in appointment of committees for fixation, revision and implementation. A lot of industries and industries do not fall under the purview of the act as their specific minimum wage rates are yet to be fixed. Permanent Labour Inspectors have not been posted in many districts and those posted are known to not visit their districts regularly. For instance in 2008, inspections in Arunachal Pradesh were as low as 7 while Maharashtra reported to have 71651 inspections.
- Terminology: The government and its committees have defined three types of wages: 'living wage', 'minimum wage' and 'fair wage'. These concepts are vague in definition and correspond to a utopia where the government and industry could afford them.

== Conflict of MGNREGA wage rates and the Minimum Wages Act ==
The Mahatma Gandhi National Rural Employment Guarantee Act is an employment guarantee scheme that guarantees employment for 100 days at a wage rate of INR120 per day (as fixed in 2009). These benefits can be secured by any household regardless of whether they fall below or above national poverty line. The central government delinked MGNREGA wage rates from State specific Minimum wage rates in January 2009 when states like Uttar Pradesh, Rajasthan and Maharashtra revised and increased their minimum wage rates. This had direct implications on Central Government's budget set aside for MGNREGA scheme. The move of freezing MGNREGA scheme created an upheaval of discontent in various parts and sections of India as the move was considered to breach Minimum Wages Act, 1948. MGNREGA wage rates were less than the minimum wage rates of respective states and in five states they were even below the National Floor level of minimum wage. Protests broke out throughout India coupled with controversies over corruption, under-payment of workers, poor quality of infrastructure, ambiguous source of funds and unintended negative effect on poverty. Recommendations made by National Advisory Council and Centre Employment Guarantee Council chaired by Jean Drèze that MGNREGA's wage rates should be synced with Minimum Wages Act were rejected by the Central Government. The Central Government stuck to its decision of freezing MGNREGA wages even after an order from Supreme Court. Eventually, the Prime Minister agreed to accept recommendations and indexed MGNREGA wages to Minimum wage rates until an expert committee chaired by Pranab Mukherjee made a satisfactory index. He however maintained a clear distinction between MGNREGA wage rates and Minimum wage rates to avoid inflating budget on revision of state-wise minimum wages.

== Debate ==
From the very inception of the idea of minimum wages, the aim of policy makers was to set up a uniform wage rate across the entire country. However, such a policy would not be connected to reality due to regional differences over consumption patterns, paying capabilities of employers, requirements of employees, etc. Hence the modified aim was to achieve floor level minimum wage for regions and then further it to a national floor minimum wage. However, not everyone supported this view. In 1955, during the Tripartite Labour Conference, labour representatives demanded immediate fixation of a minimum wage at national level, at least in agriculture. The most recent development in this debate involves the Labour Ministry and the Commerce and Industry Ministry at loggerheads over the introduction of a National floor level minimum wage rate. The Commerce and Industry Ministry argues that a national rate would further burden the industry that is anyway incurring heavy costs. On the other hand, the Labour Ministry has given a proposal to the centre to impose a national floor to wage rates and most state governments have approved for it. After a two-day strike ending on 21 February 2013, PM Manmohan Singh announced that all unskilled workers would be paid the national floor level minimum wage. This would be included in one of the many amendments of the Minimum Wages Act, 1948 to be introduced this year. Currently the floor level of minimum wages is 115, though Gujarat, Maharashtra, Andhra Pradesh and Kerala have set lower floors.

== See also ==
- Indian labour law
- United Kingdom labour law
- United States labor law
- German labour law
- European labour law
- Interstate Migrant Workmen Act 1979
