= National Commission on Labour =

Indian statutory body

National Commission on Labour is an Indian statutory body to recommend the changes in the labour laws.

== History ==
The first National Commission on Labour was set up on 24 December 1966 under the Chairmanship of Justice P. B. Gajendragadkar. The Commission submitted its report in August, 1969 after detailed examination of all aspects of labour problems, both in the organised and unorganised sectors.

The second National Commission on Labour (NCL) was set up on 15 October 1999 under the chairmanship of Ravindra Varma which submitted its report to the then Prime Minister Atal Bihari Vajpayee on 29 June 2002. The first National Commission on Labour recommended that works committee be set up in any unit which has a recognized union.

The second such commission was in favour of setting up wages boards for fixing wage rates for workers in any industry.
