= List of acts of the Parliament of India =

This is a chronological and complete list of acts passed before 1861, by the Imperial Legislative Council between 1861 and 1947, the Constituent Assembly of India between 1947 and 1949, the Provisional Parliament between 1949 and 1952, and the Parliament of India since 1952. Apart from Finance Act, 863 Central Acts which are still in force as on date (including 849 Acts and 14 Spent Acts). Several of these Acts have been amended from time to time. Apart from this, various Acts have been passed by Parliament but have not been enforced as on date. List of Acts which are in force is tabulated below. These are available on Ministry of Law and Justice (Legislative Department) website as well as on India Code website which is Digital repository providing comprehensive access to Indian legislations, acts, rules and regulations.

== List of acts ==
Name of the acts	Year	Act Number
Bengal Indigo Contracts Act	1836	10
Bengal Bonded Warehouse Association Act	1838	5
Madras Rent and Revenue Sale Act	1839	7
Revenue Bombay Act	1842	13
Revenue Commissioners, Bombay Act	1842	17
Boundary-marks, Bombay Act	1846	3
Bengal Land holders' Attendance Act	1848	20
Madras Revenue Commissioner Act	1849	10
Forfeited Deposits Act	1850	25
Improvements in Town Act	1850	26
Indian Tolls Act	1851	8
Madras City Land Revenue Act	1851	12
Bombay Rent-free Estates Act	1852	11
Extending Certain Act	1852	14
Rent Recovery Act	1853	6
Shore Nuisances (Bombay and Kolaba) Act	1853	11
Bengal Bonded Warehouse Association Act	1854	5
Police Agra	1854	16
Legal Representatives' Suits Act	1855	12
Fatal Accidents Act	1855	13
Bengal Embankment Act	1855	32
Calcutta Land-revenue Act	1856	18
Tobacco Duty (Town of Bombay) Act	1857	4
Bengal Ghatwali Lands Act	1859	5
Bengal Land-revenue Sales Act	1859	11
Madras District Police Act	1859	24
Societies Registration Act	1860	21
Police Act	1861	5
Stage-Carriages Act	1861	16
Partition of Revenue-paying Estates Act	1863	19
Religious Endowments Act	1863	20
Waste-Lands (Claims) Act	1863	23
Indian Tolls Act	1864	15
Public Gambling Act	1867	3
Sarais Act	1867	22
Oudh Estates Act	1869	1
Divorce Act	1869	4
Bombay Civil Courts Act	1869	14
Court Fees Act	1870	7
Oudh Taluqdars’ Relief Act	1870	24
Cattle-Trespass Act	1871	1
Dehra Dun	1871	21
Pensions Act	1871	23
Punjab Laws Act	1872	4
Indian Contract Act	1872	9
Indian Christian Marriage Act	1872	15
Madras Civil Courts Act	1873	3
Government Savings Banks Act	1873	5
Northern India Canal and Drainage Act	1873	8
Married Women's Property Act	1874	3
Laws Local Extent Act	1874	15
Majority Act	1875	9
Chota Nagpur Encumbered Estates Act	1876	6
Bombay Revenue Jurisdiction Act	1876	10
Oudh Laws Act	1876	18
Broach and Kaira Incumbered Estates Act	1877	14
Indian Treasure Trove Act	1878	6
Northern India Ferries Act	1878	17
Dekkhan Agriculturists’ Relief Act	1879	17
Legal Practitioners Act	1879	18
Religious Societies Act	1880	1
Kazis Act	1880	12
Central Provinces Land-revenue Act	1881	18
Negotiable Instruments Act	1881	26
Indian Trusts Act	1882	2
Transfer of Property Act	1882	4
Indian Easements Act	1882	5
Powers-of-Attorney Act	1882	7
Presidency Small Cause Courts Act	1882	15
Land Improvement Loans Act	1883	19
Punjab District Boards Act	1883	20
Explosives Act	1884	4
Agriculturists' Loans Act	1884	12
Indian Telegraph Act	1885	13
Births, Deaths and Marriages Registration Act	1886	6
Deo Estate	1886	9
Suits Valuation Act	1887	7
Provincial Small Cause Courts Act	1887	9
Bengal, Agra and Assam Civil Courts Act	1887	12
Punjab Tenancy Act	1887	16
Punjab Land-revenue Act	1887	17
King of Oudh's Estate Act	1887	19
Indian Reserve Forces Act	1888	4
City of Bombay Municipal (Supplementary) Act	1888	12
King of Oudh's Estate Act	1888	14
Revenue Recovery Act	1890	1
Charitable Endowments Act	1890	6
Guardians and Wards Act	1890	8
North-Western Provinces and Oudh Act	1890	20
Easements (Extending Act V of 1882)	1891	8
Moorshedabad Act	1891	15
Bengal Military Police Act	1892	5
Madras City Civil Court Act	1892	7
Partition Act	1893	4
Sir Dinshaw Maneckjee Petit Act	1893	6
Prisons Act	1894	9
Epidemic Disease Act	1897	3
General Clauses Act	1897	10
Live-stock Importation Act	1898	9
Central Provinces Tenancy Act	1898	11
Indian Stamp Act	1899	2
Government Buildings Act	1899	4
Central Provinces Court of Wards Act	1899	24
Prisoners Act	1900	3
Indian Tolls (Army and Air Force) Act	1901	2
Works of Defence Act	1903	7
Victoria Memorial Act	1903	10
Ancient Monuments Preservation Act	1904	7
Code of Civil Procedures	1908	5
Explosive Substances Act	1908	6
Central Provinces Financial Commissioner’s Act	1908	13
Registration Act	1908	16
Presidency Towns Insolvency Act	1909	3
Anand Marriage Act	1909	7
Indian Museum Act	1910	10
Co-operative Societies Act	1912	2
Official Trusteers Act	1913	2
White Phosphorus Matches Prohibition Act	1913	5
Destructive Insects and Pests Act	1914	2
Local Authorities Loans Act	1914	9
Sir Jamsetjee Jejeebhoy Baronetcy Act	1915	10
Banaras Hindu University Act	1915	16
Hindu Disposition of Property Act	1916	15
Destruction of Records Act	1917	5
King of Oudh's Estate Validation Act	1917	12
Post Office Cash Certificates Act	1917	18
Usurious Loans Act	1918	10
Poisons Act	1919	12
Calcutta High Court (Jurisdictional Limits) Act	1919	15
Provisional Insolvency Act	1920	5
Charitable and Religious Trusts Act	1920	14
Indian Red Cross Society Act	1920	15
Aligarh Muslim University Act	1920	40
Maintenance Orders Enforcement Act	1921	18
Delhi University Act	1922	8
Indian Naval Armament Act	1923	7
Official Secrets Act	1923	19
Indian Soldiers (Litigation) Act	1925	4
Provident Funds Act	1925	19
Sikh Gurudwaras (Supplementary) Act	1925	24
Madras, Bengal and Bombay Children (Supplementary) Act	1925	35
Indian Succession Act	1925	39
Indian Forest Act	1927	16
Sale of Goods Act	1930	3
Hindu Gains of Learning Act	1930	30
Indian Partnership Act	1932	9
Indian Wireless Telegraphy Act	1933	17
Murshidabad Estate Administration Act	1933	23
Reserve Bank of India Act	1934	2
Petroleum Act	1934	30
Parsi Marriage and Divorce Act	1936	3
Agricultural Produce (Grading and Marking) Act	1937	1
Arya Marriage Validation Act	1937	19
Muslim Personal Law (Shariat) Application Act	1937	26
Insurance Act	1938	4
Manoeuvres, Field Firing and Artillery Practice Act	1938	5
Cutchi Memons Act	1938	10
Dissolution of Muslim Marriages Act	1939	8
Commercial Documents Evidence Act	1939	30
Drugs and Cosmetics Act	1940	23
Coffee Act	1942	7
Reciprocity Act	1943	9
Central Excise Act	1944	1
Public Debt Act	1944	18
International Monetary Fund and Bank Act	1945	47
Delhi Special Police Establishment Act	1946	25
Armed Forces (Emergency Duties) Act	1947	15
Rubber Act	1947	24
United Nations (Security Council) Act	1947	43
United Nations (Privileges and Immunities) Act	1947	46
Indian Nursing Council Act	1947	48
Pharmacy Act	1948	8
Dock Workers (Regulation of Employment) Act	1948	9
Rehabilitation Finance Administration Act	1948	12
Damodar Valley Corporation Act	1948	14
National Cadet Corps Act	1948	31
Calcutta Port (Pilotage) Act	1948	33
Census Act	1948	37
Diplomatic and Consular Officers (Oaths and Fees) Act	1948	41
Coal Mines Provident Fund and Miscellaneous Provisions Act	1948	46
Oil Fields (Regulation and Development) Act	1948	53
Territorial Army Act	1948	56
Central Silk Board Act	1948	61
Reserve Bank (Transfer of Public Ownership) Act	1948	62
Delhi and Ajmer-Merwara Land Development Act	1948	66
Mangrol and Manavadar (Administration of Property)	1949	2
Scheduled Securities (Hyderabad) Act	1949	7
Seaward Artillery Practice Act	1949	8
Banking Regulation Act	1949	10
West Godavari District (Assimilation of Laws on Federal Subjects) Act	1949	20
Chartered Accountants Act	1949	38
Industrial Disputes (Banking and Insurance Companies) Act	1949	54
Police Act	1949	64
Central Reserve Police Force Act	1949	66
High Courts (Seals) Act	1950	7
Immigrants (Expulsion from Assam) Act	1950	10
Emblems and Names (Prevention of Improper Use) Act	1950	12
Special Criminal Courts (Jurisdiction) Act	1950	18
Transfer of Prisoners Act	1950	29
Union Territories (Laws) Act	1950	30
Army and Air Force (Disposal of Private Property) Act	1950	40
Ajmer Tenancy and Land Records Act	1950	42
Representation of the People Act	1950	43
Air Force Act	1950	45
Army Act	1950	46
Contingency Fund of India Act	1950	49
Road Transport Corporations Act	1950	64
Khaddar (Protection of Name) Act	1950	78
Jallianwala Bagh National Memorial Act	1951	25
Visva-Bharati Act	1951	29
President's Emoluments and Pension Act	1951	30
Finance Commission (Miscellaneous Provisions) Act	1951	33
Scheduled Areas (Assimilation of Laws) Act	1951	37
Marking of Heavy Packages Act	1951	39
Rajghat Samadhi Act	1951	41
Representation of the People Act	1951	43
Assam (Alteration of Boundaries) Act	1951	47
Companies (Donations to National Funds) Act	1951	54
All India Services Act	1951	61
State Financial Corporations Act	1951	63
Industries (Development and Regulation) Act	1951	65
Inflammable Substances Act	1952	20
Requisitioning and Acquisition of Immovable Property Act	1952	30
Presidential and Vice-Presidential Elections Act	1952	31
Cinematograph Act	1952	37
Notaries Act	1952	53
Salaries and Allowances of Ministers Act	1952	58
Commissions of Inquiry Act	1952	60
Reserve and Auxiliary Air Forces Act	1952	62
State Armed Police Forces (Extension of Laws) Act	1952	63
Forward Contracts (Regulation) Act	1952	74
Scheduled Areas (Assimilation of Laws) Act	1953	16
Salaries and Allowances of Officers of Parliament Act	1953	20
Tea Act	1953	29
Andhra State Act	1953	30
Calcutta High Court (Extension of Jurisdiction) Act	1953	41
Coir Industry Act	1953	45
Lushai Hills District (Change of Name) Act	1954	18
Drugs and Magic Remedies (Objectionable Advertisements) Act	1954	21
Delivery of Books and Newspapers (Public Libraries) Act	1954	27
High Court Judges (Salaries and Conditions of Service) Act	1954	28
Salary, Allowances and Pension of Members of Parliament Act	1954	30
Shillong (Rifle Range and Umlong) Cantonments Assimilation of Laws Act	1954	31
Himachal Pradesh and Bilaspur (New State) Act	1954	32
Special Marriage Act	1954	43
Essential Commodities Act	1955	10
Protection of Civil Rights Act	1955	22
State Bank of India Act	1955	23
Hindu Marriage Act	1955	25
Prisoners (Attendance in Courts) Act	1955	32
Durgah Khawaja Saheb Act	1955	36
Prize Competitions Act	1955	42
Manipur (Courts) Act	1955	56
Citizenship Act	1955	57
University Grants Commission Act	1956	3
All-India Institute of Medical Sciences Act	1956	25
Hindu Succession Act	1956	30
Life Insurance Corporation Act	1956	31
Hindu Minority and Guardianship Act	1956	32
Interstate River Water Disputes Act	1956	33
States Reorganisation Act	1956	37
Bihar and West Bengal (Transfer of Territories) Act	1956	40
Securities Contracts (Regulation) Act	1956	42
National Highways Act	1956	48
River Boards Act	1956	49
Lok Sahayak Sena Act	1956	53
Supreme Court (Number of Judges) Act	1956	55
Khadi and Village Industries Commission Act	1956	61
Jammu and Kashmir (Extension of Laws) Act	1956	62
Central Sales Tax Act	1956	74
Hindu Adoptions and Maintenance Act	1956	78
Manipur (Village Authorities in Hill Areas) Act	1956	80
Faridabad Development Corporation Act	1956	90
Slum Areas (Improvement and Clearance) Act	1956	96
Immoral Traffic (Prevention) Act	1956	104
Women's and Children's Institutions (Licensing) Act	1956	105
Copyright Act	1957	14
Coal Bearing Areas (Acquisition and Development) Act	1957	20
Railway Protection Force Act	1957	23
Wealth-Tax Act	1957	27
Inter-State Corporation Act	1957	38
Naga Hills-Tuensang Area Act	1957	42
Public Employment (Requirement as to Residence) Act	1957	44
Cantonments (Extension of Rent Control Laws) Act	1957	46
Delhi Development Act	1957	61
Navy Act	1957	62
Delhi Municipal Corporation Act	1957	66
Mines and Minerals (Development and Regulation) Act	1957	67
Gift-tax Act	1958	18
Probation of Offenders Act	1958	20
Ancient Monuments and Archaeological Sites and Remains Act	1958	24
Armed Forces (Special Powers) Act	1958	28
Sugar Export Promotion Act	1958	30
Supreme Court Judges (Salaries and Conditions of Service) Act	1958	41
International Finance Corporation (Status, Immunities and Privileges) Act	1958	42
Orissa Weights and Measures (Delhi Repeal) Act	1958	57
Delhi Rent Control Act	1958	59
Parliament (Prevention of Disqualification) Act	1959	10
Cost Accountants Act	1959	23
Rajasthan and Madhya Pradesh (Transfer of Territories) Act	1959	47
Arms Act	1959	54
Andhra Pradesh and Madras (Alteration of Boundaries) Act	1959	56
Indian Statistical Institute Act	1959	57
Geneva Conventions Act	1960	6
Orphanages and Other Charitable Homes (Supervision and Control) Act	1960	10
Bombay Reorganisation Act	1960	11
Delhi Land Holdings (Ceiling) Act	1960	24
International Development Association (Status, Immunities and Privileges) Act	1960	32
Manipur Land Revenue and Land Reforms Act	1960	33
Delhi Primary Education Act	1960	39
Tripura Land Revenue and Land Reforms Act	1960	43
Prevention of Cruelty to Animals Act	1960	59
Preference Shares (Regulation of Dividend) Act	1960	63
Acquired Territories (Merger) Act	1960	64
Advocates Act	1961	25
Salar Jung Museum Act	1961	26
Dowry Prohibition Act	1961	28
Delhi (Urban Areas) Tenants' Relief Act	1961	30
Union Territories (Stamp and Court-fees Laws) Act	1961	33
Dadra and Nagar Haveli Act	1961	35
Voluntary Surrender of Salaries (Exemption from Taxation) Act	1961	46
Deposit Insurance and Credit Guarantee Corporation Act	1961	47
Apprentices Act	1961	52
Institutes of Technology Act	1961	59
Goa, Daman and Diu (Administration) Act	1962	1
Hindi Sahitya Sammelan Act	1962	13
National Co-operative Development Corporation Act	1962	26
State of Nagaland Act	1962	27
Atomic Energy Act	1962	33
Extradition Act	1962	34
Foreigners Law (Application and Amendment) Act	1962	42
Pondicherry (Administration) Act	1962	49
Petroleum and Minerals Pipelines (Acquisition of Right of User in Land) Act	1962	50
Customs Act	1962	52
Manipur (Sales of Motor Spirit and Lubricants) Taxation Act	1962	55
State Associated Banks (Miscellaneous Provisions) Act	1962	56
Delhi Motor Vehicles Taxation Act	1962	57
Warehousing Corporations Act	1962	58
Marine Insurance Act	1963	11
Official Languages Act	1963	19
Government of Union Territories Act	1963	20
Export (Quality Control and Inspection) Act	1963	22
Limitation Act (Section 5 of the Indian Limitation Act)	1963	36
Textiles Committee Act	1963	41
Administrators-General Act	1963	45
Specific Relief Act	1963	47
Central Boards of Revenue Act	1963	54
Companies (Profits) Surtax Act	1964	7
Taxation Laws (Continuation and Validation of Recovery Proceedings) Act	1964	11
Dakshina Bharat Hindi Prachar Sabha Act	1964	14
Legal Tender (Inscribed Notes) Act	1964	28
Food Corporation of India Act	1964	37
Warehousing Corporations (Supplementary) Act	1965	20
Goa, Daman and Diu (Extension of the Code of Civil Procedure and the Arbitration Act) Act	1965	30
Railways Employment of Members of the Armed Forces Act	1965	40
Cardamom Act	1965	42
Union Territories (Direct Election to the House of the People) Act	1965	49
Seamen's Provident Fund Act	1966	4
Asian Development Bank Act	1966	18
Delhi High Court Act	1966	26
Railway Property (Unlawful Possession) Act	1966	29
Punjab Reorganisation Act	1966	31
Police Forces (Restriction of Rights) Act	1966	33
Post-Graduate Institute of Medical Education and Research, Chandigarh, Act	1966	51
Jawaharlal Nehru University Act	1966	53
Seeds Act	1966	54
Land Acquisition (Amendment and Validation) Act	1967	13
Passports Act	1967	15
Unlawful Activities (Prevention) Act	1967	37
Jammu and Kashmir Representation of the People (Supplementary) Act	1968	3
Bihar and Uttar Pradesh (Alteration of Boundaries) Act	1968	24
Central Laws (Extension to Jammu and Kashmir) Act	1968	25
Pondicherry (Extension of Laws) Act	1968	26
Civil Defence Act	1968	27
Enemy Property Act	1968	34
Andhra Pradesh and Mysore (Transfer of Territory) Act	1968	36
Insecticides Act	1968	46
Border Security Force Act	1968	47
Central Industrial Security Force Act	1968	50
Judges (Inquiry) Act	1968	51
Legislative Assembly of Nagaland (Change in Representation) Act	1968	61
President (Discharge of Functions) Act	1969	16
Registration of Births and Deaths Act	1969	18
Union Territories (Separation of Judicial and Executive Functions) Act	1969	19
Foreign Marriage Act	1969	33
Bihar Land Reforms Laws (Regulating Mines and Minerals) Validation Act	1969	42
Khuda Bakhsh Oriental Public Library Act	1969	43
Oaths Act	1969	44
Assam Reorganisation (Meghalaya) Act	1969	55
Banking Companies (Acquisition and Transfer of Undertakings) Act	1970	5
Haryana and Punjab Agricultural Universities Act	1970	16
Supreme Court (Enlargement of Criminal Appellate Jurisdiction) Act	1970	28
Patents Act	1970	39
State of Himachal Pradesh Act	1970	53
Medical Termination of Pregnancy Act	1971	34
Public Premises (Eviction of Unauthorised Occupants) Act	1971	40
Comptroller and Auditor General's (Duties, Powers and Conditions of Service) Act	1971	56
Naval and Aircraft Prize Act	1971	59
Prevention of Insults to National Honour Act	1971	69
Contempt of Courts Act	1971	70
Manipur (Hill Areas District Council) Act	1971	76
North-Eastern Area (Reorganisation) Act	1971	81
Delhi Sikh Gurdwaras Act	1971	82
North-Eastern Council Act	1971	84
Marine Products Export Development Authority Act	1972	13
Departmental Inquiries (Enforcement of Attendance of Witnesses and Production of Documents) Act	1972	18
Architects Act	1972	20
Taxation Laws (Extension to Jammu and Kashmir) Act	1972	25
National Service Act	1972	28
Delhi Lands (Restriction on Transfer) Act	1972	30
Diplomatic Relations (Vienna Convention) Act	1972	43
Antiquities and Art Treasures Act	1972	52
Wild Life (Protection) Act	1972	53
General Insurance Business (Nationalisation) Act	1972	57
Former Secretary of State Service Officers (Conditions of Service) Act	1972	59
Carriage by Air Act	1972	69
Richardson and Cruddas Limited (Acquisition and Transfer of Undertakings) Act	1972	78
Diplomatic and Consular Officers (Oaths and Fees) (Extension to Jammu and Kashmir) Act	1973	2
Delhi School Education Act	1973	18
North-Eastern Hill University Act	1973	24
Authoritative Texts (Central Laws) Act	1973	50
Delhi Urban Art Commission Act	1974	1
Water (Prevention and Control of Pollution) Act	1974	6
Economic Offences (Inapplicability of Limitation) Act	1974	12
University of Hyderabad Act	1974	39
Interest-tax Act	1974	45
Oil Industry (Development) Act	1974	47
Conservation of Foreign Exchange and Prevention of Smuggling Activities Act	1974	52
East-Punjab Urban Rent Restriction (Extension to Chandigarh) Act	1974	54
Sick Textile Undertakings (Nationalisation) Act	1974	57
Tobacco Board Act	1975	4
Tokyo Convention Act	1975	20
Rampur Raza Library Act	1975	22
Delhi Sales Tax Act	1975	43
Customs Tariff Act	1975	51
Election Laws (Extension to Sikkim) Act	1976	10
Smugglers and Foreign Exchange Manipulators (Forfeiture of Property) Act	1976	13
Bonded Labour System (Abolition) Act	1976	19
Regional Rural Banks Act	1976	21
High Court at Patna (Establishment of a Permanent Bench at Ranchi) Act	1976	57
Departmentalisation of Union Accounts (Transfer of Personnel) Act	1976	59
Betwa River Board Act	1976	63
Life Insurance Corporation (Modification of Settlement) Act	1976	72
Disturbed Areas (Special Courts) Act	1976	77
Territorial Waters, Continental Shelf, Exclusive Economic Zone and other Maritime Zones Act	1976	80
Parliamentary Proceedings (Protection of Publication) Act	1977	15
Salary and Allowances of Leaders of Opposition in Parliament Act	1977	33
Lady Hardinge Medical College and Hospital (Acquisition and Miscellaneous Provisions) Act	1977	34
Interest Act	1978	14
Public Sector Iron and Steel Companies (Restructuring) and Miscellaneous Provisions Act	1978	16
Coast Guard Act	1978	30
Metro Railways (Construction of Works) Act	1978	33
Delhi Police Act	1978	34
Press Council Act	1978	37
Prize Chits and Money Circulation Scheme (Banning) Act	1978	43
Coconut Development Board Act	1979	5
Union Duties of Excise (Distribution) Act	1979	24
Haryana and Uttar Pradesh (Alteration of Boundaries) Act	1979	31
Prevention of Blackmarketing and Maintenance of Supplies of Essential Commodities Act	1980	7
Banking Companies (Acquisition and Transfer of Undertakings) Act	1980	40
Essential Services Maintenance (Assam) Act	1980	41
National Company (Acquisition and Transfer of Undertakings) Act	1980	42
Brahmaputra Board Act	1980	46
Sree Chitra Tirunal Institute for Medical Sciences and Technology, Trivandrum, Act	1980	52
Hotel-Receipts Tax Act	1980	54
Company Secretaries Act	1980	56
Jute Companies (Nationalisation) Act	1980	62
National Security Act	1980	65
Bird and Company Limited (Acquisition and Transfer of Undertakings and Other Properties) Act	1980	67
Van (Sanrakshan Evam Samvardhan) Act	1980	69
Hind Cycles Limited and Sen-Raleigh Limited (Nationalisation) Act	1980	70
Air (Prevention and Control of Pollution) Act	1981	14
High Court and Bombay (Extension of Jurisdiction to Goa, Daman and Diu) Act	1981	26
Export-Import Bank of India Act	1981	28
British India Corporation Limited (Acquisition of Shares) Act	1981	29
Dalmia Dadri Cement Limited (Acquisition and Transfer of Undertakings) Act	1981	31
Maritime Zones of India (Regulation of Fishing by Foreign Vessels) Act	1981	42
Anti-Apartheid (United Nations Convention) Act	1981	48
National Bank for Agriculture and Rural Development Act	1981	61
African Development Fund Act	1982	1
Sugar Development Fund Act	1982	4
Chit Funds Act	1982	40
Governors (Emoluments, Allowances and Privileges) Act	1982	43
State Bank of Sikkim (Acquisition of Shares) and Miscellaneous Provisions Act	1982	62
Suppression of Unlawful Acts against Safety of Civil Aviation Act	1982	66
African Development Bank Act	1983	13
Emigration Act	1983	31
Punjab Disturbed Areas Act	1983	32
Chandigarh Disturbed Areas Act	1983	33
Armed Forces (Punjab and Chandigarh) Special Powers Act	1983	34
Illegal Migrants (Determination by Tribunals) Act	1983	39
Public Financial Institutions (Obligation as to Fidelity and Secrecy) Act	1983	48
Prevention of Damage to Public Property Act	1984	3
Asiatic Society Act	1984	5
Inchek Tyres Limited and National Rubber Manufacturers Limited (Nationalisation) Act	1984	17
Indian Veterinary Council Act	1984	52
Terrorist Affected Areas (Special Courts) Act	1984	61
Family Courts Act	1984	66
National Capital Region Planning Board Act	1985	2
Calcutta Metro Railway (Operation and Maintenance) Temporary Provisions Act	1985	10
Administrative Tribunals Act	1985	13
Bhopal Gas Leak Disaster (Processing of Claims) Act	1985	21
Handlooms (Reservation of Articles for Production) Act	1985	22
Indira Gandhi National Open University Act	1985	50
Pondicherry University Act	1985	53
Intelligence Organisations (Restriction on Rights) Act	1985	58
Judges (Protection) Act	1985	59
Narcotic Drugs and Psychotropic Substances Act	1985	61
Inland Waterways Authority of India Act	1985	82
Agricultural and Processed Food Products Export Development Authority Act	1986	2
Spices Board Act	1986	10
Muslim Women (Protection of Rights on Divorce) Act	1986	25
Coal Mines Labour Welfare Fund (Repeal) Act	1986	27
Environment (Protection) Act	1986	29
Swadeshi Cotton Mills Company Limited (Acquisition and Transfer of Undertakings) Act	1986	30
State of Mizoram Act	1986	34
National Security Guard Act	1986	47
Delhi Apartment Ownership Act	1986	58
Indecent Representation of Women (Prohibition) Act	1986	60
Child Labour (Prohibition and Regulation) Act	1986	61
State of Arunachal Pradesh Act	1986	69
Jute Packaging Materials (Compulsory Use in Packing Commodities) Act	1987	10
Goa, Daman and Diu Mining Concessions (Abolition and Declaration as Mining Leases) Act	1987	16
Goa, Daman and Diu Reorganisation Act followed by Constitution (Fifty-sixth Amendment) Act	1987	18
Expenditure-tax Act	1987	35
National Dairy Development Board Act	1987	37
Legal Services Authorities Act	1987	39
All India Council for Technical Education Act	1987	52
National Housing Bank Act	1987	53
Railway Claims Tribunal Act	1987	54
Chandigarh (Delegation of Powers) Act	1988	2
Commission of Sati (Prevention) Act	1988	3
Special Protection Group Act	1988	34
Religious Institutions (Prevention of Misuse) Act	1988	41
Benami Transactions (Prohibition) Act	1988	45
Prevention of Illicit Traffic in Narcotic Drugs and Psychotropic Substances Act	1988	46
Prevention of Corruption Act	1988	49
Labour Laws (Exemption from Furnishing Returns and Maintaining Registers by certain Establishments) Act	1988	51
Auroville Foundation Act	1988	54
Jamia Millia Islamia Act	1988	58
Motor Vehicles Act	1988	59
National Highways Authority of India Act	1988	68
Assam University Act	1989	23
Railways Act	1989	24
Scheduled Caste and Scheduled Tribe (Prevention of Atrocities) Act	1989	33
Nagaland University Act	1989	35
Small Industries Development Bank of India Act	1989	39
National Commission for Women Act	1990	20
Armed Forces (Jammu and Kashmir) Special Powers Act	1990	21
Prasar Bharati (Broadcasting Corporation of India) Act	1990	25
Public Liability Insurance Act	1991	6
Remittances of Foreign Exchange and Investment in Foreign Exchange Bonds (Immunities and Exemptions) Act	1991	41
Places of Worship (Special Provisions) Act	1991	42
Government of National Capital Territory of Delhi Act	1992	1
Destructive Insects and Pests (Amendment and Validation) Act	1992	12
Securities and Exchange Board of India Act	1992	15
Cess and Other Taxes on Minerals (Validation) Act	1992	16
National Commission for Minorities Act	1992	19
Foreign Trade (Development and Regulation) Act	1992	22
Special Court (Trial of Offences Relating to Transactions in Securities) Act	1992	27
Rehabilitation Council of India Act	1992	34
Indo-Tibetan Border Police Force Act	1992	35
Central Agricultural University Act	1992	40
Infant Milk Substitutes, Feeding Bottles and Infant Foods (Regulation of Production, Supply and Distribution) Act	1992	41
Industrial Finance Corporation (Transfer of Undertaking and Repeal) Act	1993	23
Gold Bonds (Immunities and Exemptions) Act	1993	25
Multimodal Transportation of Goods Act	1993	28
Acquisition of Certain Area at Ayodhya Act	1993	33
SAARC Convention (Suppression of Terrorism) Act	1993	36
Central Laws (Extension to Arunachal Pradesh) Act	1993	44
Tezpur University Act	1993	45
Employment of Manual Scavengers and Construction of Dry Latrines (Prohibition) Act	1993	46
Recovery of Debts Due to Banks and Financial Institutions Act	1993	51
National Commission for Safai Karamcharis Act	1993	64
Oil and Natural Gas Commission (Transfer of Undertaking and Repeal) Act	1993	65
Public Records Act	1993	69
National Council for Teacher Education Act	1993	73
Kalakshetra Foundation Act	1994	6
Protection of Human Rights Act	1994	10
Manipur Panchayati Raj Act	1994	26
Transplantation of Human Organs Act	1994	42
Manipur Municipalities Act	1994	43
New Delhi Municipal Council Act	1994	44
Punjab Municipal Corporation Law (Extension to Chandigarh) Act	1994	45
Airports Authority of India Act	1994	55
Pre-conception and Pre-natal Diagnostic Techniques (Prohibition of Sex Selection) Act	1994	57
Babasaheb Bhimrao Ambedkar University Act	1994	58
Cable Television Networks (Regulation) Act	1995	7
Textile Undertakings (Nationalisation) Act	1995	39
Unified Waqf Management, Empowerment, Efficiency and Development Act	1995	43
Technology Development Board Act	1995	44
Depositories Act	1996	22
Arbitration and Conciliation Act	1996	26
Provisions of the Panchayats (Extension to the Scheduled Areas) Act	1996	40
Maulana Azad National Urdu University Act	1997	2
Mahatama Gandhi Antarashtriya Hindi Vishwavidyalaya Act	1997	3
Industrial Reconstruction Bank (Transfer of Undertakings and Repeal) Act	1997	7
Lalit Kala Akademi (Taking Over of Management) Act	1997	17
Telecom Regulatory Authority of India Act	1997	24
Vice-President's Pension Act	1997	30
Dock Workers (Regulation of Employment) (Inapplicability to Major Ports) Act	1997	31
National Institute of Pharmaceutical Education and Research Act	1998	13
Lotteries (Regulation) Act	1998	17
Leaders of Chief Whips of Recognised Parties and Groups in Parliament (Facilities) Act	1999	5
Urban Land (Ceiling and Regulation) Repeal Act	1999	15
Insurance Regulatory and Development Authority Act	1999	41
Foreign Exchange Management Act	1999	42
National Trust for Welfare of Persons with Autism, Cerebral Palsy, Mental Retardation and Multiple Disabilities Act	1999	44
Trade Marks Act	1999	47
Geographical Indications of Goods (Registration and Protection) Act	1999	48
Designs Act	2000	16
Information Technology Act	2000	21
Madhya Pradesh Reorganisation Act	2000	28
Uttar Pradesh Reorganisation Act	2000	29
Bihar Reorganisation Act	2000	30
Chemical Weapons Convention Act	2000	34
Semiconductor Integrated Circuits Layout-Design Act	2000	37
Coal India (Regulation of Transfer and Validation) Act	2000	45
Central Road Fund Act	2000	54
Mizoram University Act	2001	8
Indian Council of World Affairs Act	2001	29
Advocates’ Welfare Fund Act	2001	45
Energy Conservation Act	2001	52
Protection of Plant Varieties and Farmers' Rights Act	2001	53
Delimitation Act	2002	33
Haj Committee Act	2002	35
Foreign Aircraft (Exemption from Taxes and Duties on Fuel and Lubricants) Act	2002	36
Multi-State Co-operative Societies Act	2002	39
Securitisation and Reconstruction of Financial Assets and Enforcement of Security Interest Act	2002	54
Unit Trust of India (Transfer of Undertaking and Repeal) Act	2002	58
Metro Railway (Operation and Maintenance) Act	2002	60
Suppression of Unlawful Acts against Safety of Maritime Navigation and Fixed Platforms on Continental Shelf Act	2002	69
Competition Act	2003	12
Control of National Highways (Land and Traffic) Act	2003	13
Prevention of Money Laundering Act	2003	15
Offshore Areas Mineral (Development and Regulation) Act	2003	17
Biological Diversity Act	2003	18
Cigarettes and Other Tobacco Products (Prohibition of Advertisement and Regulation of Trade and Commerce, Production, Supply and Distribution) Act	2003	34
Electricity Act	2003	36
Fiscal Responsibility and Budget Management Act	2003	39
Central Vigilance Commission Act	2003	45
Repatriation of Prisoners Act	2003	49
Industrial Development Bank (Transfer of Undertaking and Repeal) Act	2003	53
Sick Industrial Companies (Special Provisions) Repeal Act	2004	1
Prevention of Terrorism (Repeal) Act	2004	26
National Commission for Minority Educational Institutes Act	2005	2
Parel Investments and Trading Private Limited and Domestic Gas Private Limited (Taking over of Management) Repeal Act	2005	14
Weapons of Mass Destruction and Their Delivery Systems (Prohibition of Unlawful Activities) Act	2005	21
Right to Information Act	2005	22
Coastal Aquaculture Authority Act	2005	24
University of Allahabad Act	2005	26
Bihar Value Added Tax Act	2005	27
Special Economic Zones Act	2005	28
Private Security Agencies (Regulation) Act	2005	29
Credit Information Companies (Regulation) Act	2005	30
Protection of Women from Domestic Violence Act	2005	43
National Tax Tribunal Act	2005	49
State Emblem of India (Prohibition of Improper Use) Act	2005	50
Disaster Management Act	2005	53
Manipur University Act	2005	54
Andhra Pradesh Legislative Council Act	2006	1
Commissions for Protection of Child Rights Act	2006	4
Petroleum and Natural Gas Regulatory Board Act	2006	19
Micro, Small and Medium Enterprises Development Act	2006	27
National Institute of Fashion Technology Act	2006	28
Food Safety and Standards Act	2006	34
Actuaries Act	2006	35
Government Securities Act	2006	38
Cantonments Act	2006	41
Pondicherry (Alteration of Name) Act	2006	44
Assam Rifles Act	2006	47
Uttaranchal (Alteration Of Name) Act	2006	52
Scheduled Tribes and Other Traditional Forest Dwellers (Recognition of Forest Rights) Act	2007	2
Central Educational Institutions (Reservation in Admission) Act	2007	5
Prohibition of Child Marriage Act	2007	6
English and Foreign Languages University Act	2007	7
Rajiv Gandhi University Act	2007	8
Tripura University Act	2007	9
Sikkim University Act	2007	10
Sports Broadcasting Signals (Mandatory Sharing With Prasar Bharati) Act	2007	11
national Rural Employment Guarantee(Extension to Jammu And Kashmir) Act	2007	23
National Institutes of Technology Act	2007	29
Warehousing (Development and Regulation) Act	2007	37
Carriage by Road Act	2007	41
Tyre Corporation of India Limited (Disinvestment Of Ownership) Act	2007	50
Payment and Settlement Systems Act	2007	51
Indira Gandhi National Tribal University Act	2007	52
Sashastra Seema Bal Act	2007	53
Rajiv Gandhi Institute of Petroleum Technology Act	2007	54
Armed Forces Tribunal Act	2007	55
Maintenance And Welfare of Parents and Senior Citizens Act	2007	56
Jawaharlal Institute of Postgraduate Medical Education and Research, Puducherry Act	2008	19
Indian Maritime University Act	2008	22
Airports Economic Regulatory Authority Of India Act	2008	27
National Investigation Agency Act	2008	34
Gram Nyayalayas Act	2009	4
Limited Liability Partnership Act	2009	6
Collection of Statistics Act	2009	7
South Asian University Act	2009	8
National Jute Board Act	2009	12
Central Universities Act	2009	25
Prevention and Control Of Infectious And Contagious Diseases In Animals Act	2009	27
Right of Children to Free and Compulsory Education Act	2009	35
Legal Metrology Act	2010	1
Tamil Nadu Legislative Council Act	2010	16
National Green Tribunal Act	2010	19
Clinical Establishments (Registration and Regulation) Act	2010	23
Land Ports Authority of India Act	2010	31
Civil Liability for Nuclear Damage Act	2010	38
Nalanda University Act	2010	39
Foreign Contribution (Regulation) Act	2010	42
Coinage Act	2011	11
Orissa (Alteration of Name) Act	2011	15
National Capital Territory of Delhi Laws (Special provisions) Second Act	2011	20
Factoring Regulation Act	2012	12
Academy of Scientific and Innovative Research Act	2012	13
Protection of Children from Sexual Offences Act	2012	32
Rajiv Gandhi National Institute of Youth Development Act	2012	35
National Institute of Mental Health and Neurosciences, Bangalore Act	2012	38
Sexual Harassment of Women at Workplace (Prevention, Prohibition and Redressal) Act	2013	14
Companies Act	2013	18
National Food Security Act	2013	20
Pension Fund Regulatory and Development Authority Act	2013	23
Prohibition of Employment as Manual Scavengers and their Rehabilitation Act	2013	25
Rajiv Gandhi National Aviation University Act	2013	26
Right to Fair Compensation and Transparency in Land Acquisition, Rehabilitation and Resettlement Act	2013	30
Lokpal and Lokayuktas Act	2014	1
Andhra Pradesh Reorganisation Act	2014	6
Street Vendors Act	2014	7
National institute of Design Act	2014	18
National institute of Information Technology Act	2014	30
School of Planning and Architecture Act	2014	37
National Judicial Appointments Commission Act	2014	40
Juvenile Justice (Care and Protection of Children) Act	2015	2
Coal Mines (Special Provisions) Act	2015	11
Repealing and Amending Act	2015	17
Repealing and Amending (Second) Act	2015	19
Black Money (Undisclosed Foreign Income and Assets) and Imposition of Tax Act	2015	22
Commercial Courts Act	2016	4
Bureau of Indian Standards Act	2016	11
Real Estate (Regulation and Development) Act	2016	16
National Waterways Act	2016	17
Aadhar (Targeted Delivery of Financial and Other Subsidies, Benefits and Services) Act	2016	18
Repealing and Amending Act	2016	23
Anti-Hijacking Act	2016	30
Insolvency and Bankruptcy Code	2016	31
Dr. Rajendra Prasad Central Agricultural University Act	2016	32
Regional centre for Biotechnology Act	2016	36
Compensatory Afforestation Fund Act	2016	38
Rights of Persons with Disabilities Act	2016	49
Specified Bank Notes (Cessation of Liabilities)	2017	2
Mental Health Care Act	2017	10
Central Goods and Services Tax Act	2017	12
Integrated Goods and Services Tax Act	2017	13
Union Territory Goods and Services Tax Act	2017	14
Goods and Services Tax (Compensation to States) Act	2017	15
Human Immunodeficiency Virus and Acquired Immune Deficiency Syndrome (Prevention and Control) Act	2017	16
Footwear Design and Development Institute Act	2017	20
Admiralty (Jurisdiction and Settlement of Maritime Claims) Act	2017	22
Indian Institutes of Information Technology (Public-Private Partnership) Act	2017	23
Central Goods and Services Tax (Extension to Jammu and Kashmir) Act	2017	26
Integrated Goods and Services Tax (Extension to Jammu and Kashmir) Act	2017	27
Indian Institute of Management Act	2017	33
Repealing and Amending Act	2018	2
Indian Institute of Petroleum and Energy Act	2018	3
Repealing and Amending (Second) Act	2018	4
Fugitive Economic Offenders Act	2018	17
National commission for Backward Classes (Repeal) Act	2018	24
National Sports University Act	2018	25
Central Education Institutes (Reservation in Teachers' Cadre) Act	2019	10
India International Arbitration Centre Act	2019	17
Muslim Women (Protection of Rights on Marriage) Act	2019	20
Banning of Unregulated Deposit Schemes Act	2019	21
Codes on Wages Act	2019	29
National Medical Commission Act	2019	30
Repealing and Amending Act	2019	31
Jammu and Kashmir Reorganisation Act	2019	34
Consumer Protection Act	2019	35
Transgender Persons (Protection of Rights) Act	2019	40
Prohibition of Electronic Cigarettes (Production, Manufacture, Import, Export Transport, Sale, Distribution, Storage and Advertisement) Act	2019	42
Dadra and Nagar Haveli And Daman and Diu (Merger of Union Territories) Act	2019	44
National Capital Territory of Delhi (Recognition of Property Rights of Residents in Unauthorised Colonies) Act	2019	45
Recycling of Ships Act	2019	49
International Financial Services Centers Authority Act	2019	50
Direct Tax Vivad se Vishwas Act	2020	3
Central Sanskrit Universities Act	2020	5
National Commission for Indian System of Medicine Act	2020	14
Goods and Services (Compensation to States) Act	2020	15
Institute of Teaching and Research In Ayurveda Act	2020	16
Jammu and Kashmir Official Languages Act	2020	23
Bilateral Netting Qualified Financial Contracts Act	2020	30
Rashtriya Raksha University Act	2020	31
National Forensic Sciences University Act	2020	32
Industrial Relation Code	2020	35
Code on Social Security	2020	36
Occupational Safety, Health and Working Conditions Code	2020	37
Major Port Authorities Act	2021	1
National Commission For Allied And Health care Professions Act	2021	14
National Bank For Financing Infrastructure And Development Act	2021	17
National Institutes Of food Technology, Entrepreneurship And Management Act	2021	19
The Marine Aids to Navigation Act	2021	20
Inland Vessel Act	2021	24
Commission For Air Quality Management National Capital Region and Adjoining Areas Act	2021	29
Farm Laws Repeal Act	2021	40
Dam Safety Act	2021	41
Assisted Reproductive Technology (Regulation) Act	2021	42
Surrogacy (Regulation) Act	2021	47
Criminal Procedure (Identification) Act	2022	11
Indian Antarctic Act	2022	13
National Anti-Doping Act	2022	15
Maritime Anti-Piracy Act	2023	3
National Dental Commission Act	2023	21
Digital Personal Data Protection Act	2023	22
Anusandhan National Research Foundation Act	2023	25
National Nursing and Midwifery Commission Act	2023	26
Inter-Services Organisations (Command, Control and Discipline) Act	2023	28
Mediation Act	2023	32
Repealing and Amending Act	2023	37
Post Office Act	2023	43
Telecommunications Act	2023	44
Bharatiya Nyaya Sanhita	2023	45
Bharatiya Sakshya Adhiniyam	2023	46
Bharatiya Nagarik Suraksha Sanhita	2023	47
Chief Election Commissioner and Other Election Commissioners (Appointment, Conditions of Service and Term of Office) Act	2023	49
Provision for Collection of Taxes Act	2023	50
Press and Registration of Periodicals Act	2023	51
Public Examination (Prevention of Unfair Means) Act	2024	1
Bharatiya Vayuyan Adhiniyam	2024	16
‘‘Tribhuvan” Sahkari University Act	2025	11
Boilers Act	2025	12
Immigration And Foreigner Act	2025	13
Mussalman Waqf (Repeal) Act	2025	15
Protection of Interests In Aircraft Objects Act	2025	17
Bills of Lading Act	2025	18
Carriage of Goods By Sea Act	2025	19
Coastal Shipping Act	2025	20
Readjustment of Representation of Scheduled Tribes in Assembly Constituencies of the State of Goa Act	2025	21
Merchant Shipping Act	2025	24
National Sports Governance Act	2025	25
Indian Ports Act	2025	27
Income Tax Act	2025	30
Promotion and Regulation of Online Gaming Act	2025	32
Health Security Se National Security Cess Act	2025	35
Viksit Bharat–Guarantee for Rozgar and Ajeevika Mission (Gramin) Act	2025	36
Repealing and Amending Act	2025	37
Central Armed Police Forces (General Administration) Act	2026	9
Bankers’ Books Evidence Act	2026	15
Tribunal Reforms Act	2026	17
Kerala (Alteration of Name) Act	2026	18

== List of Spent Acts ==
Name of the act	Year	Act Number
Inheritance Act	1839	30
Defence of India Act	1962	51
Essential Service Maintenance Act	1968	59
Defence and Internal Security of India Act	1971	42
Emergency Risks (Goods) Insurance Act	1971	50
Emergency Risks (Under-Takings) Insurance Act	1971	51
Newspapers (Price Control) Act	1972	15
Essential Service (Maintenance) Act	1981	42
Delhi Laws (Special Provisions) Act	2006	22
National Capital Territory of Delhi Laws (Special Provisions) Act	2007	43
National Capital Territory of Delhi Laws (Special Provisions) Act	2009	24
National Capital Territory of Delhi Laws (Special Provisions) Second Act	2009	40
National Capital Territory of Delhi Laws (Special provisions) Act	2011	5
Essential Defence Services Act	2021	25

== List of Acts not enforced ==
Name of the act	Year	Act Number
Delhi Rent Act	1955	33
Whistle Blowers Protection Act	2014	17
Sustainable Harnessing and Advancement of Nuclear for Transforming India	2025	39

== See also ==
- Constitution of India
- Lawmaking procedure in India
- List of amendments of the Constitution of India
