= Section 5 =

Section 5 may refer to:

- Section 5 of the Indian Limitation Act
- Section 5 of the Public Order Act 1986, in England and Wales
- Section 5 of the Canadian Charter of Rights and Freedoms
- Section 5 of the Constitution of Australia
- Section 5 of the Voting Rights Act, in the United States
- Section 5 of the Immigration Act 2010, in Belize
- Section 5 of the Indian Penal Code, exemption clause for certain laws
- Section 5, a football hooligan firm

== See also ==
- Military Intelligence, Section 5 or MI5, British domestic intelligence agency
