= Jwaalamukhi =

1985 Kannada film by Singeetham Srinivasarao

- Poster
- Directed by: Singeetham Srinivasa Rao
- Screenplay by: Chi. Udaya Shankar; Singeetham Srinivasa Rao
- Story by: Vijay Sasanur
- Produced by: S. A. Chinne Gowda; S. A. Srinivas
- Starring: Rajkumar; Gayathri
- Cinematography: B. C. Gowrishankar
- Edited by: P. Bhaktavatsalam
- Music by: M. Ranga Rao
- Production company: Kathyayini Cine Art Combines
- Release date: 1985
- Running time: 150 minutes
- Country: India
- Language: Kannada

Jwaalamukhi ( transl. Volcano) is a 1985 Indian Kannada-language film directed by Singeetham Srinivasa Rao. The film featured Rajkumar, Gayathri, Thoogudeepa Srinivas, K. S. Ashwath and Mukhyamantri Chandru. The movie is based on a novel of same name by Vijay Sasanur.

Initially, it was planned to adapt the novel Shivatandava by the same writer into a movie. Eventually, the plan was dropped and Jwaalamukhi was selected. The movie is also remembered to have the Official Secrets Act and the Antiquities Act as narrative devices in its plot.

== Plot ==
The story revolves around the heroics of Jayasimha, played by Rajkumar. The story starts with an introductory scene where Jayasimha explains his resignation as a professor. Well educated, rich in values and honesty will be Jayasimha's attributes. He exposes the forgery done by mischief in the college and the favorable probe trial of that case makes him resign from the college. The mischief maker happens to be the son of the influential builder in the town, Gunasekara, played by Mukhyamantri Chandru.

Soon after leaving the professor job, he starts working as a journalist for a press led by Rudraiah, played by K. S. Ashwath. He becomes successful in changing the mindset of matka mafia gang leader Ratanlal, played by Thoogudeepa Srinivas. In the meanwhile, Jayasimha falls in love with Gayathri, who plays the role of Tejaswini. The second half of the story unfolds the battle between truth/fact-finding versus influence and power of Gunasekara.

The movie marks the splendid performance of Rajkumar in the role of a fighter against injustice.

== Cast ==
- Rajkumar as Jayasimha
- Gayathri as Thejaswini, Jayasimha's wife
- Mukhyamantri Chandru as Gunashekhara
- Thoogudeepa Srinivas as Ratanlal, Jayasimha's friend and former Matka king
- K. S. Ashwath as Rudraiah
- Leelavathi as Dr. S. Sarojini, Thejaswini's mother
- Advani Lakshmi Devi as Jayasimha's mother
- Shivaram as Public Prosecutor
- Sadashiva Brahmavar as Ranganna
- Mysore Lokesh as Gunashekhara's lawyer
- Honnavalli Krishna as junior lawyer
- Shani Mahadevappa as judge
- Hanumanthachar as Subbanarsimhaiah
- Aditya Chikkanna as Constable Paandu
- Agro Chikkanna as Police Officer Raveendra
- Thimmayya as Thejaswini's lawyer

== Soundtrack ==
The music was composed by M. Ranga Rao with lyrics written by Chi. Udayashankar. The song Baale Prema Geethe was loosely inspired by the song Tere Mere Sapne from the 1965 Hindi movie Guide.

Jwalamukhi

Soundtrack album by M. Ranga Rao
- Label: Sangeetha Music

Track #	Song	Singer(s)	Lyrics
1	"Eko Eno Ee Nanna Manavu"	Dr. Rajkumar, Bangalore Latha	Chi. Udayashankar
2	"Heluvudu Ondu Maaduvudu Innondu"	Dr. Rajkumar, Bangalore Latha	Chi. Udayashankar
3	"Nodi Nodi Ella Nodi"	Dr. Rajkumar, S. Janaki	Chi. Udayashankar
4	"Baale Prema Geethe"	Dr. Rajkumar	Chi. Udayashankar
