= MSTC =

MSTC may refer to:

- MSTC Limited
- Maharashtra State Textile Corporation
- Manchester Suburban Tramways Company, a company established in 1877 to provide horse-drawn tram services throughout Manchester and Salford, England
- Mansfield State Teachers College, a former name of Mansfield University of Pennsylvania
- Math, Science, and Technology Center of Paul Laurence Dunbar High School, Lexington, Kentucky
- MacNaughton Science & Technology Center, a former name of Bernice MacNaughton High School in Moncton, New Brunswick, Canada
- Mid-State Technical College, central Wisconsin, United States
