= Samba spy scandal =

Scandal by Indian Army

The Samba Military Spy Scandal was a Cold War military intelligence program which eventually emerged as a scandal in 1979. According to the Indian Army, the military program was run by the MI of Pakistan to seek information on the Indian Army's deposition in Western India. The Indian Army and associated intelligence agencies led the arrest of 50 active duty Army officers and personnel on suspicion of working for the Military Intelligence of the Pakistan Army from Samba in the former state of Jammu and Kashmir. Samba, Jammu is a sleepy town in the Jammu region bordering Pakistan. The revelation of scandal led to a serious breach in foreign relations of India and Pakistan.

Between 24 August 1978 and 23 January 1979, 50-odd persons who had worked in the 168 Infantry Brigade and its subordinate units at Samba, 40 km from Jammu on the international border, were arrested on charges of spying for Pakistan at the instance of the Directorate of Military Intelligence (MI). Its investigations involved practically the whole officer cadre of the brigade. Those arrested included a brigadier, three lieutenant colonels, and a number of majors, captains, junior commissioned officers (JCOs), non-commissioned officers (NCOs), and personnel of other ranks, plus 11 civilians who had worked in the Samba sector. They were all taken into custody at the instance of two self-confessed Pakistani spies who worked as gunners in the Indian Army - Sarwan Dass and Aya Singh.

== Guilty or not guilty ==
The whole story, written by A. G. Noorani, was published in Frontline. The book The Price of Loyalty, written by Captain Ranbir Singh Rathaur, is a first hand account of the brutal and inhuman torture inflicted on the officers and men who were falsely implicated in the Samba Spy Case. In 2018, Major Nirmal Ramchand Ajwani, Major A K Rana, Captain Diwan, Captain R S Rathore, and Captain J S Yadav, claimed that they were framed under manipulated documentation and military intelligence power abuse, and demanded an independent probe.

== Court proceeding ==
The Delhi High Court gave judgement in favour of the accused but the Supreme Court overturned the Delhi High Court's judgement. The accused lost their case in the Supreme Court of India on 6 March 2014. But they kept moving to courts for justice. In 2019, over 40 years of the alleged scandal, the Delhi High Court, sought a response from the Government of India following a petition filed by former Captains, Ashok Kumar Rana and Ranbir Singh Rathaur.

== Controversies ==
The Samba spy scandal still remains a controversial issue. In December 1994, Sarwan Das swore an affidavit and appeared at a press conference to admit that he had falsely implicated the men. In December 1990, Aya Singh was killed while crossing the India-Pakistan border. The falsely implicated victims received justice only in December 2000, and not full either.

According to Major Navdeep Singh, the entire case is a debacle as the case was based on Aya Singh's statement where Singh claimed Captain Nagial was the initiator of the scam but a Court Martial acquitted Captain Nagial. Major Singh also brought some major issues of the case; including: Aya Singh, who was killed while trying to cross Indo-Pak border, can not be a reliable witness; Havildar Ram Swarup's confessional statement also built the case while Ram Swarup died of torture after interrogation; Swaran Dass made an under oath statement in 1994 in which Dass was forced to implicate innocent army personnel. Major Singh also raised a statement, "When the foundation itself was faulty, there was no reason for proceeding in the matter."
