= Murder of Aishwarya =

2024 murder in India

- Date: January 2 to 3 of 2024
- Type: Murder, Honor killing
- Cause: Inter-caste marriage
- Deaths: Aishwarya
- Suspects: Aishwarya's parents, Perumal and Roja and her relatives

The killing of Aishwarya occurred between January 2 to 3 of 2024.

A Kallar Hindu, Aishwarya, 19 years old, married Naveen, a Dalit on December 31, 2023, following an 18-month relationship. The couple met in school and worked at a knitting unit in Tiruppur. Following the wedding, the couple moved to Veerapandi, Theni. A missing persons report was filed by Aishwarya's parents, Perumal and Roja, which led to Aishwarya being returned to her parents despite her being of the age of majority.

On January 3, 2024, Naveen learned about the death and cremation of Aishwarya, filing a police report on January 7 under the suspicion Aishwarya was murdered by her parents.

Perumal and Roja were later arrested for the torturing and hanging of their daughter who was later cremated and police officer Murugaiyan suspended for enforcing the return of Aishwarya to her parents. Several other members of Aishwarya's family were detained in relation to the incident.
