= Swadeshi Cotton Mills =

Defunct Indian cotton textile company

- Type: State-owned
- Industry: Textiles
- Founded: 1921
- Founder: Horseman family
- Defunct: 1986 (nationalised)
- Fate: Nationalised by Act of Parliament; mills subsequently closed
- Successor: National Textile Corporation
- Headquarters: Kanpur, India
- Area served: India
- Products: Cotton yarn and cloth

Swadeshi Cotton Mills was an Indian cotton textile company with its headquarters in Kanpur, Uttar Pradesh. Incorporated in 1921, it was one of the largest composite textile groups in northern India, with mills in Kanpur and five other towns. In 1978 the Government of India took over management of the company's textile units, and in 1986 Parliament passed a law nationalising them and transferring them to the National Textile Corporation. The 1978 takeover was the subject of a widely cited 1981 Supreme Court of India ruling on administrative law. The mills subsequently ceased production, along with most other government-run textile mills in Kanpur.

== History ==
=== Establishment and expansion ===
The company was incorporated in Kanpur in 1921 as a private company by the Horseman family, which converted an existing partnership business into a joint-stock company. Its original mill was known as "The Swadeshi Cotton Mills, Kanpur". Between 1956 and 1973 the company set up or acquired five further textile units, in Puducherry, Naini, Udaipur, Maunath Bhanjan and Rae Bareilly, each separately registered under the Industries (Development and Regulation) Act, 1951. The company also held a 97 per cent stake in a subsidiary, Swadeshi Mining and Manufacturing Company Ltd, which operated two sugar mills. Between 1957 and 1974, the company's reserves and surplus rose from ₹2.3 crore to ₹4.3 crore, and its fixed assets grew from ₹5.8 crore to ₹19 crore. By the time of a later legal dispute over company property, Raja Ram Jaipuria was the company's managing director.

=== Labour unrest ===
Kanpur's textile mills had a long history of labour disputes dating back to the early twentieth century.

In 1977, twelve people were killed when police opened fire on workers protesting outside Swadeshi Cotton Mills over delayed wages.

=== Government takeover ===
On 13 April 1978, the Government of India, invoking section 18AA(1)(a) of the Industries (Development and Regulation) Act, 1951, ordered the takeover of the management of Swadeshi Cotton Mills' six textile undertakings, stating that the company had created encumbrances on the assets of the undertakings that had affected production. The National Textile Corporation was authorised to administer the undertakings. The company and its managing director challenged the takeover order in court, arguing that they had not been given a hearing before the order was passed.

=== Swadeshi Cotton Mills v. Union of India ===
The dispute reached the Supreme Court of India as Swadeshi Cotton Mills v. Union of India, decided on 13 January 1981. A five-judge bench considered whether the principle of audi alteram partem (the right to be heard) applied to a takeover order under section 18AA, even though the statute did not expressly require a prior hearing. The Court held that natural justice required at least a post-decisional hearing before such an order could take effect, a ruling frequently cited in Indian administrative law.

=== Nationalisation ===
Parliament subsequently enacted the Swadeshi Cotton Mills Company Limited (Acquisition and Transfer of Undertakings) Act, 1986, nationalising the company's six textile undertakings and vesting them in the National Textile Corporation, with compensation payable to the company. Sections 27 and 28 of the Act came into force on enactment, while the remaining provisions were deemed to have taken effect from 1 April 1985. Some non-textile assets of the company, including a Kanpur property known as "the Shrubbery", were held to fall outside the scope of the acquisition and remained the subject of separate litigation between the company and the National Textile Corporation.

=== Closure ===
Following nationalisation, the Kanpur mill operated as one of the National Textile Corporation's units in the city. By the mid-2010s, of the nine composite mills once run in Kanpur by the National Textile Corporation and the British India Corporation, only two remained even partly functional, and Swadeshi Cotton Mills was not among them.

== See also ==
- British India Corporation
- National Textile Corporation
- Kanpur
