= Tata Textiles =

Indian textile manufacturer

- Founded: 1874; 152 years ago
- Defunct: 1997; 29 years ago
- Headquarters: Bombay, India
- Parent: Tata Group

Tata Textile Mills was a textile mills business of Tata Group, with its head office in Bombay. It consisted of four textile mills; namely, Central India Mills also popularly known as Empress Mills in Nagpur, the Svadeshi Mills in Bombay, the Tata Mills in Bombay, and the Advance Mills in Ahmedabad. For several decades the four mills produced and sold fabrics under the much-reputed brand name of Tata Textiles.

Tata made its first entry into manufacturing and industry in 1874, when it founder, Jamsetji Tata, started The Central India Spinning, Weaving and Manufacturing Company in Victoria Mills, later renamed Empress Mill when Queen Victoria was proclaimed Empress of India on 1 January 1877. In 1887, Jamsetji purchased the failing Dharamsi Mills located at Kurla, renamed it Svadeshi Mill, and made it a success, with its produced cloth extensively exported to China, Korea, Japan, and the Levant. The Ahmadabad Advance Mills began its operation in 1903.

Jointly, Tata mills were one of the big producers of cotton textiles in India until the 1980s. The four mills of Tata Textiles produced about 150 million metres of cotton and other cloth annually in 1972, having 325,000 spindles and 6,845 looms. Tatas gradually exited from textile business, from the 1980s, selling Nagpur-based Empress Mills in 1986, which was taken over by Maharashtra State Textile Corporation, which closed the mill, in 2002. In 1990 they exited from 87 year old New Ahmadabad Advance Mills, which was sold to Phulchand Exports. The Tata Mill at Parel was taken over by National Textile Corporation. Tata Housing Development Company was reported to be gaining possession of a large area of land in the heart of Mumbai, which had been in possession of the defunct National Textiles Corporation-run Tata Mills at Parel. While Svadeshi Mill wound up after it went to BIFR, in 1997, and the Shapoorji Pallonji Group has since waged a legal battle, as its chief creditor. By 1997, Tata Textile Mills wound up all its business.
