= Benami Transactions (Prohibition) Act, 1988 =

Act of the Parliament of India

Parliament of India
- Long title: An Act to prohibit benami transactions and the right to recover property held benami and for matters connected therewith or incidental thereto.
- Citation: THE BENAMI TRANSACTIONS (PROHIBITION) ACT, 1988; THE BENAMI TRANSACTIONS (PROHIBITION) AMENDMENT ACT, 2016
- Enacted by: Parliament of India
- Commenced: 19 May 1988
- Status: In force

Benami Transactions (Prohibition) Act, 1988 (name changed to Prohibition of Benami Property Transactions Act, 1988 by section 3 of the 2016 amendment) is an Act of the Parliament of India that prohibits certain types of financial transactions. The act defines a 'benami' transaction as any transaction in which property is transferred to one person for consideration paid by another person. Such transactions were a feature of the Indian economy, usually relating to the purchase of property (real estate), and were thought to contribute to the Indian black money problem. The act bans all benami transactions and gives the government the right to recover property held benami without paying any compensation.

The act came into force on 5 September 1988. Although benami transactions are now illegal, the act had limited success in curbing them. Updated versions were therefore passed in 2011 and 2016, seeking to more comprehensively enforce the prohibition.

== Etymology ==
Benami is a word in various North Indian languages that means "without name" or "nameless". In this Act, the word is used to define a transaction in which the real beneficiary is not the one in whose name a property is purchased. As a result, the person in whose name the property is purchased or held is just a mask of the real beneficiary.

== Background ==
In 1973, the Law Commission of India after studying various Acts and the prevailing benami system, recommended formulating an Act to tackle the issue. Accordingly, the Benami Transactions (Prohibition) Act, 1988 was enacted by the Parliament which came into force on 19 May 1988.

However, due to various deficiencies in the Act, the rules required for operationalising the Act were not framed. To address these deficiencies, the Govt of India introduced Benami Transactions (Prohibition) Bill, 2011.

== Amendments ==
In an attempt to curb black money, in July 2016, the Modi government decided to amend the original act which was subsequently passed by the Parliament of India as "The Benami Transactions (Prohibition) Amendment Act, 2016". Thereafter, the Government notified the provisions of the act to come into force from 1 November 2016. Mint newspaper reported that the Benami Act along with the Black Money (Undisclosed Foreign Income and Assets) and Imposition of Tax Act, 2015, would help the Government in its fight against black money both within and outside the country. The 2016 Act also has safeguard mechanisms such as the adjudicating authority and the appellate mechanism.

The act "prohibits illegal benami transactions, and provides imprisonment up to seven years and fine for violation of the Act which may extend to 25% of the fair market value of the benami property."

== Enforcement ==
=== Authorities ===
The Act establishes four authorities to conduct inquiries regarding benami transactions:

| Sl. No. | Name of Authority | Post of Authority | Responsibility |
|---|---|---|---|
| 1 | Initiating Officer | Assistant Commissioner of Income-Tax (ACIT) or a Deputy Commissioner of Income-Tax (DCIT) | Notice and attachment of property |
| 2 | Approving Authority | Additional Commissioner of Income-Tax (AdlCIT) or a Joint Commissioner of Income-Tax(JCIT) | Notice to furnish evidence |
| 3 | Administrator | Income Tax Officer (ITO) | Possession and management of properties confiscated |
| 4 | Adjudicating Authority | Officers Drawn from ITD | Confiscation and vesting of property |

=== Results ===
On 26 July 2017, the Modi government told the Rajya Sabha that after coming into force from 1 November 2016, properties worth over ₹800 crore (US$122.85 million) were under attachment in more than 400 proxy transaction cases identified so far. Furthermore, the government has set up 24 Benami Prohibition Units (BPUs) across India for taking action under the Benami Act.

== See also ==
- List of acts of the Parliament of India
