= Navdeep Singh (lawyer) =

Major Navdeep Singh is an author, lawyer and a former reservist-volunteer of the Indian Territorial Army.

== Career ==
Major Navdeep Singh is a lawyer and former officer in the Indian Territorial Army, a volunteer force in which gainfully employed and self-employed professionals receive military training for a few days in a year so that in the event of a war or a national emergency they can bear arms for the defence of the nation. Singh is also the youngest person connected with the Territorial Army to have been the recipient of eleven commendations from the defence services, including tri-services institutions. Singh was decorated even after his release from the Territorial Army

== Profession ==
Navdeep Singh is a lawyer by profession and is based at the High Court of the States of Punjab & Haryana in Chandigarh, India. He is an invited member of the advisory committee on military justice of the Commonwealth Secretariat from India and also an International Fellow of the National Institute of Military Justice. He was formerly a part of a High Level Committee constituted by the Government of India to reduce litigation. The Committee was constituted on the directions of Narendra Modi directly under Manohar Parrikar.

He is credited with the execution of implementation of the Indian Tolls (Army & Air Force) Act, 1901 all over India. This Act which was passed in 1901 provides for toll tax exemption to private vehicles of defence personnel irrespective of whether they are on duty or not. There was a controversy over implementation of the Act on private toll operators and private toll roads and bridges but the controversy was settled in 2003 when on a case taken up by him, the Indian Ministry of Road Transport & Highways clarified that the Act was valid even for the present times and toll exemption was to be granted to both 'on duty' and 'off duty' defence personnel.

Toll tax exemption to defence personnel was later challenged in the Punjab & Haryana High Court by way of a Public Interest Litigation (PIL) but the petition was dismissed by the Court which upheld the exemption. The Indian Tolls (Army & Air Force) Act, 1901 was then challenged in the Supreme Court of India but the petition was dismissed by the Supreme Court too, thus upholding the provisions of the Act which provides a very special privilege to the military community.

He is also credited with effective implementation of entertainment tax exemption to serving defence personnel in cinemas and theatres. Most of the Indian states offer entertainment tax exemption to men in uniform but the rule was seldom followed or recognised by cinema halls.

He has also been the proponent of wide ranging progressive changes in the military judicial system and the Armed Forces Tribunal.

He was also elected the first President of the Armed Forces Tribunal Bar association as reported in the media.

Perhaps his biggest contribution, as reported in the media, is his support for the functional improvement of quasi-judicial bodies such as Tribunals, especially the Armed Forces Tribunal, in which he has succeeded to a great extent with the support of the Government.

He was also a votary of a National Tribunal Commission for administering tribunals in India, a concept that was directed to be instituted by the Supreme Court of India in November 2020 with the active endorsement of the Attorney General for India.

== Other work ==
He has also worked for the benefit of World War-II veterans and authored several books. Soldiers Know Your Rights was released by General J J Singh, India's Chief of the Army Staff and Pension in the defence services was released by Western Army Commander of India, General T K Sapru.

Another lesser known book called Fauj Hai Mauj (Military is fun) was also written by him.

Singh was a part of a Committee of Experts constituted by the Modi Government to render recommendations for decreasing litigation by the Ministry of Defence and to review all anomalies of service and pension matters and also to strengthen the system of redressal of grievances in the Armed Forces. The 509-page report was submitted in November 2015 in record time and was stated to have submitted practical, workable, reformatory and gradual solutions as per the official Government press release

As reported in the media, he was also a part of the historic “Yale Draft” attended by judges, jurists and representatives of the United Nations to improve upon the ‘UN Draft Principles governing the Administration of Justice through Military Tribunals’ at the Yale University.

He has been associated with other efforts initiated in the Yale Law School for global reform in military justice and military law.

He was on the Drafting Committee for the Stellenbosch Draft (Commonwealth Military Justice Principles), 2023 along with another Indian lawyer, Aishwarya Bhati, currently Additional Solicitor General of India.

=== Bibliography ===
- Fauj Hai Mauj; 2000
- Soldiers, Know Your Rights; 2005
- Pension in the Defence Services; 2009
- Military Pensions: Commentary, Case Law & Provisions; 2020
- March to Justice: Global Military Law Landmarks; 2021
- In Her Defence - Ten Landmark Judgements on Women in the Armed Forces; 2024
- Ability - Landmark Judgements on Disability Jurisprudence in India; 2025
