= Registration of Births and Deaths Act, 1969 =

Act of the Parliament of India

Parliament of India
- Long title: An Act to provide for the regulation of registration of births and deaths and for matters connected therewith.
- Citation: Act No. 18 of 1969
- Territorial extent: India
- Enacted: 31 May 1969
- Assented to by: President

Amended by
- Delegated Legislation Provisions (Amendment) Act, 1985 (4 of 1985); Registration of Birth and Deaths (Amendment) Act, 2023 (20 of 2023)

Related legislation
- Births, Deaths and Marriages Registration Act, 1886
- Status: In force (amended)

The Registration of Births and Deaths Act, 1969 (Act No. 18 of 1969) is an Act of the Parliament of India. It was enacted to promote uniformity and comparability in the registration of Births and Deaths across the country and compilation of vital statistics.

== Amendments ==
The Registration of Births and Deaths (Amendment) Act, 2023 has made amendments to this act that the Registrar General of India will maintain a national database of registered births and deaths. And the Chief Registrars (of states) and Registrars (appointed by states for local area jurisdiction) are obligated to share data of registered births and deaths to the national database.

This amendment was introduced in Lok Sabha on 26 July 2023 and passed on 1 August 2023. And by Rajya Sabha on 7 August 2023.
