= Carriage of Goods by Sea Act, 2025 =

Legislation in India

Parliament of India
- Long title: An Act to provide for the responsibilities, liabilities, rights and immunities attached to carriers with respect to the carriage of goods by sea and for matters connected therewith or related thereto.
- Citation: Act No. 19 of 2025
- Territorial extent: India
- Passed by: Lok Sabha
- Passed: 28 March 2025
- Passed by: Rajya Sabha
- Passed: 6 August 2025
- Assented to by: President
- Assented to: 8 August 2025
- Commenced: 10 September 2025

Legislative history

Initiating chamber: Lok Sabha
- Bill title: Carriage of Goods by Sea Bill, 2024
- Bill citation: Bill No. 112C of 2024
- Introduced by: Sarbananda Sonowal, Minister of Ports, Shipping and Waterways
- Introduced: 9 August 2024
- Passed: 28 March 2025

Revising chamber: Rajya Sabha
- Passed: 6 August 2025

Repeals
- Indian Carriage of Goods by Sea Act, 1925
- Status: In force

The Carriage of Goods by Sea Act, 2025 is an Act of the Parliament of India that replaces the Carriage of Goods by Sea Act, 1925. It modernises the legal framework governing bills of lading, the rights and responsibilities of carriers, shippers, and consignees, and incorporates provisions from international conventions on maritime cargo transport.

== Background and timeline ==
=== Background ===
The Carriage of Goods by Sea Act, 1925 was based on the Hague Rules and had not kept pace with developments in global shipping. The 2025 Act updates Indian law to reflect the Hague–Visby Rules and certain provisions from the Hamburg Rules, ensuring consistency with international maritime transport standards and addressing multimodal transport realities.

=== Timeline ===
- 28 March 2025: The Carriage of Goods by Sea Act, 2025 was passed by Lok Sabha.
- 6 August 2025: The Carriage of Goods by Sea Act, 2025 was passed by Rajya Sabha.

== Provisions ==
=== Scope and Application ===
The Act applies to contracts for the carriage of goods by sea under bills of lading or similar documents of title, covering both import and export shipments from Indian ports.

=== Carrier Responsibilities ===
Carriers must exercise due diligence to make the ship seaworthy, properly manned, equipped, and supplied; and to carefully handle, load, stow, carry, keep, care for, and discharge the goods carried.

=== Shipper Responsibilities ===
Shippers must ensure the accuracy of cargo descriptions, markings, and quantities, and indemnify carriers for losses arising from misdeclaration.

=== Liability and Limitation ===
The Act updates liability limits in line with the Hague–Visby Rules, prescribes timelines for notice of loss or damage, and defines exceptions to liability.

=== Jurisdiction and Dispute Resolution ===
The Act provides that disputes may be resolved through Indian courts or arbitration as per contractual agreements, with jurisdiction clauses subject to Indian law.

=== Electronic Documentation ===
Recognises electronic bills of lading and related digital transport documents, facilitating paperless trade.

== See also ==
- Merchant Shipping Act, 2025
- Indian Ports Act, 2025
- Hague–Visby Rules
