= Press and Registration of Periodicals Act, 2023 =

Law for registration of the print and publishing industry in India

Parliament of India
- Long title: An Act to provide for press, registration of periodicals and for matters connected therewith or incidental thereto.
- Citation: No. 51 of 2023
- Territorial extent: whole of India
- Passed by: Rajya Sabha
- Passed: 3 August 2023
- Considered by: Lok Sabha
- Passed: 21 December 2023
- Assented to by: President Droupadi Murmu
- Assented to: 28 December 2023
- Commenced: 1 March 2024

Legislative history

Initiating chamber: Rajya Sabha
- Bill title: Press and Registration of Periodicals Bill, 2023
- Bill citation: Bill No. LIII of 2023
- Introduced by: Anurag Singh Thakur, Minister of Information & Broadcasting and Youth Affairs & Sports
- Introduced: 1 August 2023
- Passed: 3 August 2023

Revising chamber: Lok Sabha
- Passed: 21 December 2023

Repeals
- Press and Registration of Books Act, 1867 (25 of 1867)
- Status: In force

The Press and Registration of Periodicals Act, 2023 is an Act of the parliament of india. The bill for this act was introduced in the Rajya Sabha by Minister of Information and Broadcasting, Anurag Thakur on 1 August 2023. The act seeks to replace the existing 156-year-old Press and Registration of Books Act, 1867 legislation from the colonial era.

The proposed legislation was scheduled to be deliberated upon in the Lok Sabha during the Parliament Special Session, 2023.

== Proposals ==
The Bill stipulates the requirement for the registration of newspapers, periodicals, and books, as well as the cataloguing of books. The proposed legislation aims to streamline the digital procedures involved in verifying and registering periodical titles by the Press Registrar General of the Registrar of Newspapers for India (RNI). The bill also stipulates that a declaration identifying the printer/publisher must be submitted to the District Magistrate (DM). The DM is responsible for forwarding the declaration to the Press Registrar, who subsequently issues a certificate of registration. It is imperative that the aforementioned declaration and authentication by the DM are completed prior to the publication of the newspaper. The proposed Bill permits the publisher of a periodical to obtain a registration certificate by submitting an online application to the Press Registrar General and the designated local authority. Individuals who have been convicted of a terrorist act or unlawful activity, or have acted against the security of the State, are prohibited from publishing a periodical.

The Bill that the central government is authorized to designate a Press Registrar, whose responsibility is to uphold a record of newspapers. Additionally, the proposed legislation outlines the creation of the Press Registrar General of India, who will be responsible for issuing registration certificates for all periodicals.

The Bill confers upon the Press Registrar General the authority to suspend the registration of a periodical for a minimum duration of 30 days, with the possibility of extension up to 180 days. The grounds for suspension include instances where registration was obtained through the provision of false information, failure to maintain continuous publication of periodicals, and the provision of false particulars in annual statements.

== Reactions ==
The Editors Guild of India has formally requested the Lok Sabha Speaker to refer the bill in question to a parliamentary select committee, with the aim of facilitating a comprehensive and in-depth discussion on the critical issues pertaining to press freedom. They highlighted apprehension regarding the "draconian provisions" of the proposed bill in a letter addressed to Prime Minister Narendra Modi, Lok Sabha Speaker Om Birla, Rajya Sabha Chairman Jagdeep Dhankhar, various political party leaders including the Minister of Information and Broadcasting, Anurag Singh Thakur.
