= Prorogation =

Parliamentary term

Prorogation in the Westminster system of government is the action of proroguing, or interrupting, a parliament, or the discontinuance of meetings for a given period of time, without a dissolution of parliament. The term is also used for the period of such a discontinuance between two legislative sessions of a legislative body.

== Ancient Rome ==
In the constitution of ancient Rome, prorogatio was the extension of a commander's imperium beyond the one-year term of his magistracy, usually that of consul or praetor. Prorogatio developed as a legal procedure in response to Roman expansionism and militarization.

This usage is unrelated to the modern parliamentary term.

== Australia ==
In Australia, prorogation is a power of the governor-general and is the ending of a session in the Australian Parliament pursuant to section 5 of the Constitution of Australia. It is constitutionally distinct from dissolution, another power of the governor-general, which removes all serving MPs from office pending the election of new ones. A prorogation conventionally occurs at the same time as a dissolution, for the purpose of bringing all business in Parliament to an end prior to an election.

The prime minister of Australia may request that the governor-general prorogue parliament. Although prorogation before the end of a parliamentary term is not unconstitutional, it is usually rejected by the governor-general.

== Canada ==
Prorogation is the end of a session in the Parliament of Canada.

== India ==
Prorogation implies the end of the sitting as well as the session and not the dissolution of the House in the Indian Parliament. The Rajya Sabha is not dissolved as it is a permanent House, only the Lok Sabha is dissolved. The president can prorogue the House while in session also.

== New Zealand ==
Prorogation is the end of a session in the New Zealand Parliament pursuant to the Constitution Act 1986. The ability of the speaker to recall parliament during an adjournment has rendered prorogation almost obsolete, and the procedure was last used in 1991.

== Northern Ireland ==
Prorogation in Northern Ireland was the end of a session in the Parliament of Northern Ireland (1921–1972).

== Pakistan ==
According to clause (1) of Article 54 of the Constitution of Pakistan, the president of Pakistan can from time to time prorogue the sessions of Parliament, both the National Assembly of Pakistan and the Senate of Pakistan.

== United Kingdom ==
Prorogation is the formal ending of a Parliamentary session in the UK Parliament.

== United States ==
Under Article II, Section 3 of the U.S. Constitution the president of the United States technically has the authority to adjourn the United States Congress "to such Time as he shall think proper" when it is unable to agree on a time of adjournment. However, this is a procedural ability that has so far never been used. The members of the Constitutional Convention agreed to limit executive authority in order to prevent autocracy. In Federalist No. 69, Alexander Hamilton differentiated the president's authority to prorogue Congress from the King of Great Britain's ability to dissolve Parliament.

On April 15, 2020, while Congress was in recess due to the COVID-19 pandemic but still holding pro forma sessions, President Donald Trump threatened to use the presidential prorogative powers to adjourn both the House of Representatives and the Senate in order to make recess appointments for positions such as the director of national intelligence and the Federal Reserve Board of Governors, citing what he argued was obstructionism and extreme partisanship from the Democratic Party. However, constitutional law experts and politicians have argued that President Trump did not have the constitutional authority to do so under those conditions, as both houses had agreed on a date of adjournment, and President Trump's argument that the president can force Congress to adjourn was widely condemned by both Republicans and Democrats. In order to prorogue Congress, the Senate would have to set a different date of adjournment than the House of Representatives. Although President Trump called on the Senate to set a new adjournment date, Senate majority leader Mitch McConnell indicated that he would not alter the planned adjournment date of January 3, 2021, and any motion to alter the date would require the approval of Senate Minority Leader Chuck Schumer and the Democratic members of the Senate through the Senate Standing Rules.

== See also ==
- The dictionary definition of prorogation at Wiktionary
- The dictionary definition of prorogue at Wiktionary
- Royal prerogative
