= Ancient Monuments and Archaeological Sites and Remains Act, 1958 =

Act of Government of India

Parliament of India
- Enacted by: Parliament of India
- Status: In force

The Ancient Monuments and Archaeological Sites and Remains Act, 1958 (abbreviated as: AMASR Act) is an act of the Parliament of India that provides for the preservation of ancient and historical monuments and archaeological sites and remains of national importance, for the regulation of archaeological excavations and for the protection of sculptures, carvings and other similar objects. It was passed in 1958. The Archaeological Survey of India (ASI) and National Monuments Authority (NMA) functions under the provisions of this act.

== Provisions ==
The act's rules stipulate that the area within 100 metres of a monument is a prohibited area. In addition, the area within 200 meters of the monument is a regulated area. Any repair or modifications of buildings in this area requires prior permission.

In 2023 the culture minister of India suggested that amendments to the act could soon be expected.

== National Monuments Authority ==
The National Monuments Authority (NMA) is a statutory body under Government of India's Ministry of Culture, established in 2011 to protect centrally protected monuments. It regulates construction, repairs, and development in prohibited and regulated areas around these sites to prevent encroaching urbanization, ensuring the preservation of India's heritage.

=== Key Functions and Responsibilities ===
Regulatory Control-

Manages development within 100 meters (prohibited) and 300 meters (regulated) of centrally protected monuments.

Heritage Management-

Frames monuments-specific heritage bye-laws and categorizes monuments based on historical/architectural value.

Approvals-

Processes applications for construction/reconstruction near protected sites via a dedicated online portal.

Legal Basis-

Established under The Ancient Monuments and Archaeological Sites and Remains (Amendment and Validation) Act, 2010.

Authority Structure-

The NMA consists of a chairperson and several members appointed by the Government of India, tasked with making recommendations to the central government regarding monument protection.

== See also ==
- Archaeology of India
- Ministry of Culture (India)
- Archaeological Survey of India
- List of acts of the Parliament of India
- Places of Worship (Special Provisions) Act, 1991
- Ancient Monuments Preservation Act 1904
- List of acts of the Parliament of India
