= Maharashtra State Textile Corporation =

Maharashtra State Textile Corporation (MSTC) is a limited company owned by Maharashtra State. It was established on 6 September 1966, having its head office at Mumbai. Their stated purpose was to take over ailing privately owned textile mills, which were being closed down, and make those mills more productive, and also to start new mills in industrially undeveloped parts of the state.

MSCT took over 26 ailing textile mills, 19 of which were later turned over to National Textile Corporation. It presently holds Pratap Mills, Amalner, Vijay Mills, Badnera, Shree Shahu Chhatrapati Mills, Kolhapur, Narsinggirji Mills, Solapur, Pulgaon Cotton Mills, Pulgaon, Western India Mills at Mumbai and the Empress Mill, Nagpur.

They started two mills namely Devagiri Textile Mills at Aurangabad in 1980 and Kalameshwar Textile Mills at Kalameshwar in 1984.

The state government closed down all the mills under MSTC in 2001, due to running in losses over the years, and presently there are no functioning textile mills under the corporation, however, the company holds the lands of these mills.
