= Science and Engineering Research Board =

Statutory body of the government of India

- Abbreviation: SERB
- Successor: Anusandhan National Research Foundation (ANRF)
- Formation: 2009
- Dissolved: 2023
- Headquarters: New Delhi
- Affiliations: Department of Science & Technology
- Website: www.serb.gov.in

Science and Engineering Research Board is a statutory body under the Department of Science and Technology, Government of India, established by an Act of the Parliament of India in 2009 (SERB ACT, 2008). The Board was chaired by the Secretary to the Government of India in the Department of Science and Technology. The Board was set up for promoting basic research in science and engineering and to provide financial assistance to scientists, academic institutions, R&D laboratories, industrial concerns and other agencies for such research. Thereafter, it was succeeded by an act called Anusandhan National Research Foundation Act 2023 which formed Anusandhan National Research Foundation in the year 2023.

== Schemes and programmes ==
The Board has schemes for funding extramural research, for providing grants for start-up research and for using the scientific expertise of retired scientists. The board has programmes for intensifying research in high priority areas, for supporting international travel of scientists, for giving assistance to professional bodies for conducting seminars and symposia, and for awarding fellowships. Promoting opportunities for women in exploratory research.

It is a scheme to mitigate gender disparity in science and engineering research funding in various S&T programs in Indian academic institutions and R&D laboratories.

== List of members of the Board ==
(May 2022- 2025) the members of the Board(oversight- committee).

1. Koppillil Radhakrishnan, Former Secretary, Department of Space, Chairperson
2. Secretary, Department of Science and Technology
3. President, Indian National Science Academy
4. President, Indian Academy of Science
5. President, Indian National Academy of Engineering
6. Professor. Devang Vipin Khakhar, Former Director, IIT Bombay
7. Dr.(Ms)Tessy Thomas, Distinguished Scientist and former Director General Aeronautical Systems(AS),DRDO
8. Professor.Talat Ahmad,Former Chairman of Governing body of Wadia Institute of Himalayan Geology, Former Vice Chancellor of Kashmir University & Jamia Millia Islamia University
9. Secretary, Science and Engineering Research Board

== Research ==
RTI reply on research

In an RTI reply about any study by SERB on hazards from mobile towers, it said that no independent research has been done by it till date but a joint research with DOT was done in 2013.
