= Sick Textile Undertakings (Nationalization) Act, 1974 =

The Sick Textile Undertakings (Nationalization) Act, 1974 is the law enacted by parliament of India in December 1974 to acquire sick textile units, reorganise and rehabilitate them to "subserve the interests of the general public by the augmentation of the production and distribution, at fair prices, of different varieties of cloth and yarn".

Under the Act, 103 sick textile mills were nationalised and transferred to the National Textile Corporation (NTC). The mill owners were paid Rs. 34.75 crore as total compensation.

The Act was amended in 1995 to allow the NTC to transfer, mortgage or dispose of the nationalized textile units' land, plant, machinery or other assets "for the better management, modernisation, restructuring and revival of sick undertakings". After this amendment NTPC, sold land to develop commercial and residential buildings in Lower Parel and other areas in Mumbai.
