= Shore Nuisances (Bombay and Kolaba) Act, 1853 =

Act of the Council of the Governor General of India

Council of the Governor General of India
- Long title: An Act to facilitate the removal of nuisances and eneroachments below high water mark in the Islands of Bombay and Kolaba.
- Citation: Act No. XI of 1853
- Enacted by: Council of the Governor General of India
- Enacted: 15 July 1853

Repealed by
- Repealed in part, By: Ports and Ports-dues Act, 1855 (Act 22 of 1855); Repealing Act, 1870 (Act 14 of 1870)
- Status: Amended

The Shore Nuisances (Bombay and Kolaba) Act, 1853 (Act XI of 1853) is a law which was enacted for large sea-shore in the islands with a view to the safe navigation of the harbour, and to facilitate the removal of nuisances, obstructions and encroachments below high-water mark in harbour, or upon or about the shores of islands in Bombay and Kolaba (now Colaba) in former British India.

The law was enacted by the Council of the Governor General of India, which was the legislative body before the establishment of the Imperial Legislative Council in 1861.

== See also ==
- Seven Islands of Bombay
- History of Bombay under British rule
