= Government Securities Act, 2006 =

Parliament of India
- Long title: An Act to consolidate and amend the law relating to Government securities and its management by the Reserve Bank of India and for matters connected therewith or incidental thereto.
- Citation: Act No. 38 of 2006
- Territorial extent: Whole of India
- Enacted: 30 August 2006
- Commenced: 1 December 2007

Repeals
- Indian Securities Act, 1920

Related legislation
- Public Debt Act, 1944; Government Securities Regulations, 2007
- Status: In force

The Government Securities Act, 2006 is a legislation of the Parliament of India, which aims to introduce various improvements in the government securities market and the management of government securities by the Reserve Bank of India (RBI).

== History ==
The Public Debt Act, 1944 was an act which provided a legal framework for the issuance and servicing of government securities in India. It was considered outdated, and the Government Securities Act, 2006 was introduced to replace it. The Act oversees government securities and their management by the RBI. The second clause of Section 2 defines government securities as securities issued by the central or a state government for the purpose of raising a public loan.

== See also ==
- Banking in India
- Public debt
- Banking Regulation Act, 1949
