= Gift-tax Act, 1958 =

Parliament of India
- Long title: An Act to provide for the levy of gift-tax.
- Citation: Act No. 18 of 1958
- Territorial extent: whole of India
- Enacted by: Parliament of India
- Enacted: 15th May 1958
- Effective: 1 April 1958
- Abrogated: 1 October 1998
- Status: Abrogated

The Gift-tax Act, 1958 was an Act of the Parliament of India which was enacted to impose tax on the act of giving or receiving gifts under certain circumstances as specified by the Act.

== Charges of Gift Tax ==
As per the Gift Tax Act, the gifts that exchanged hands post 1 April 1958 were subject to taxes as mention in Schedule I. Post 1 April 1987, this was amended to the rate of 30% (Thirty percent) and included gifts that were made in that particular Assessment Year. On 1 October 1998 however, the applicability of Gift Tax ceased to exist.

As per the Gift Tax Act 1958, gift (in the form of cash, draft, check or others) is an excess of Rs. 50,000/- received from one who doesn’t have any blood relations with the donee, were taxable. However, from 1 October 1998, Gift Tax got demolished and all the gifts made on or after that date were Tax-free. But in 2004, the Gift Tax Act was again renewed partially, and a new provision was inaugurated in the Income Tax Act 1961 under Section 56 (2). According to Gift Tax Act, 1961 the gifts received by any individual or HUF more than ₹50,000 (US$590) in a year would be taxable.

== Exemptions ==
There were certain exemptions that were allowed under the Gift Tax. In case of the exchange of gifts between blood relatives, irrespective of the value of the gift, Gift Tax was not applicable. Gift Tax was also not applicable in case of the transfers of immovable property that were situated outside the country. Gifts that were received from relatives for marriage, including gifts to the daughter in law from the bridegroom’s parents, and gifts to the son in law from the bride’s parents were also exempt from tax. Gifts received through a will or through inheritance as well as gifts to parents from their NRI sons and daughters through their NRE account were also under the Gift Tax exempt list.

== Today's law and regulations ==
As of now, gifts under the value of 50,000 are exempted from taxes. If value of a gift is above 50,000, the value would be added to your income and tax would have to be paid as per the slab of your income. If value of gift is above 50,000 , entire value would be added to your income; in simple terms, a gift of Rs. 49000 would not be taxable, while one of 75000 would be taxable to its full amount (and not merely 25000).

However, gifts forwarded to blood relatives are exempted from taxes, such as father, mother, sister or brother.

Gifts received from multiple sources are summed up. If you receive 43000 from A and 25000 from B, the value of gift received is 68000. Though each of the two gifts specifically are not taxable, but finally, the sum of 68000 would have to be shown as taxable income.
