= Black Money (Undisclosed Foreign Income and Assets) and Imposition of Tax Act, 2015 =

Act of the Parliament of India

Parliament of India
- Long title: An Act to make provisions to deal with the problem of the Black money that is undisclosed foreign income and assets, the procedure for dealing with such income and assets and to provide for imposition of tax on any undisclosed foreign income and asset held outside India and for matters connected therewith or incidental thereto.
- Citation: Act No 22 of 2015
- Territorial extent: Whole of India
- Passed by: Lok Sabha
- Passed: 11 May 2015
- Passed by: Rajya Sabha
- Passed: 13 May 2015
- Assented to by: President
- Assented to: 26 May 2015
- Commenced: 1 April 2016

Legislative history

Initiating chamber: Lok Sabha
- Bill title: Undisclosed Foreign Income and Assets (Imposition of Tax) Bill, 2015
- Bill citation: Bill No. 84 of 2015
- Introduced by: Finance Minister Arun Jaitley
- Introduced: 20 March 2015
- Passed: 11 May 2015

Revising chamber: Rajya Sabha
- Bill title: Black Money (Undisclosed Foreign Income and Assets) and Imposition of Tax Bill, 2015
- Bill citation: Bill No. 84-C of 2015
- Passed: 13 May 2015
- Status: In force

The Black Money (Undisclosed Foreign Income and Assets) and Imposition of Tax Act, 2015 (Act 22 of 2015) is an Act of the Parliament of India. It aims to curb black money, or undisclosed foreign assets and income and imposes tax and penalty on such income. The Act was passed by both Houses of the Parliament and received the presidential assent on 26 May 2015. It came into effect from 1 July 2015.

== Disclosure Opportunity ==
The goal of this law is to bring back the income and assets held abroad back to the country. As a result, only an Indian resident gets the opportunity to declare undisclosed assets. However, an amendment was made in 2019 in the Act retrospectively, to cover even persons who are non-residents but were resident when the asset was acquired or income was earned outside India.

The government gives a time frame when someone can disclose assets. If the resident holding undisclosed assets declare the assets in the given time frame they are not subject to prosecution.

The resident may want to disclose assets when they have not submitted a return on time, or if they filled and submitted a return they chose not to include certain assets or even when the taxpayer did not provide all the facts and thus the return could not be evaluated.

There are instances when a taxpayer does not get the opportunity to disclose the income and assets. Information received on or before June 30, 2015, is not considered valid because of the date of the act. A resident with unsettled legal offense under the Indian law cannot disclose money. Disclosure opportunity is not available when the tax audit is still under surveillance with accordance to Indian tax laws.

== Valuation ==
The valuation of undisclosed assets is done as per Rule 3 of Black Money (Undisclosed Foreign Income and Assets) and Imposition of Tax Rules, 2015.

== Computation ==
Under normal income tax act, taxpayers are subject to deduction but while computing for such undisclosed foreign assets and income no such deductions will be applicable. While computing, if the assets/income are movable then value computed will be used to calculate the tax but if it is taxed prior then that value would be subtracted from the undisclosed income/asset. In case of immovable object, computation keeps in mind the value at the first day of financial year.

== Penalty ==
=== Related to undisclosed foreign income and assets ===
The taxpayer holding undisclosed foreign income and assets is liable to pay a penalty which is three times the tax computed under section 10 of the article.

=== Related to default in payment of tax arrear ===
If the taxpayer is in default, he/she is liable to pay a penalty which equals amount of tax arrears.

=== Related to other defaults ===
If the taxpayer does not comply with the rules and officers and is subject to defaults then he/she is liable to pay a sum ranging from ₹ 50,000-₹ 2,00,000.

=== Related to failure in filing return ===
If a person fails to file return before the end of that assessment year then he/she is subject to ₹ 10,00,000 penalty. There will be no penalty if the aggregate balance in one or more foreign bank account is less than ₹ 5,00,000.

=== Related to failure to provide information or provide inaccurate particulars while filing ===
If a person provides inaccurate information or does not provide information in general is subject to penalty of ₹ 10,00,000. There will be no penalty if the aggregate balance in one or more foreign bank account is less than ₹ 5,00,000.

== See also ==
- List of acts of the Parliament of India
