= Clinical Establishments (Registration and Regulation) Act, 2010 =

Act of the Parliament of India

Parliament of India
- Long title: An Act to provide for the registration and regulation of clinical establishments in the country and for matters connected therewith or incidental hereto.
- Enacted by: Parliament of India
- Assented to: 18-August-2010
- Commenced: 01-March-2012
- Bill citation: No. 23 of 2010
- Status: In force

The Clinical Establishments (Registration and Regulation) Act, 2010 is an Act of the Parliament of India. It seeks to regulate all clinical establishments in India. On 15 April 2010, the Clinical Establishments (Registration and Regulation) Bill, 2010 was introduced in the Lok Sabha, the lower house of Indian parliament, for the first time. The Act requires all clinical establishments to register themselves and provides a set of standard treatment guidelines for common diseases and conditions.

The state governments must adopt the law by passing a resolution in the legislative assemblies. As of March 2018, the following states have adopted it: Arunachal Pradesh, Himachal Pradesh, Mizoram, Sikkim, Bihar, Rajasthan, Uttar Pradesh, Uttarakhand, Jharkhand, Assam, Haryana. However, not all of these states have made any clear provisions to implement the Act.

== Overview ==
The Act cannot be directly applied to all states of India. The states have the choice of passing a resolution to adopt the bill or passing a similar bill. The Act however directly applies to the states of Arunachal Pradesh, Himachal Pradesh, Mizoram, and Sikkim, as they had passed resolutions allowing such laws in their states.

The aim of the Act is to register all clinical establishments in India to make it easier to regulate them and implement standard practices. With the exception of the establishments under the military forces, all public and private establishments, including AYUSH establishments, are required to register. According to Chapter I Clause 2 (c), a clinical establishment may be a hospital, maternity home, nursing home, dispensary, clinic, sanatorium or any other institution that offer services for diagnosis, care or treatment of patients.

The Chapter II details the formation of a National Council. The Chapter III details the formation of State and Union Territory Councils. It also requires formation of district registering authorities. The Chapter IV details the registration procedure. A provisional registration shall be valid for 1 year and must be renewed. An establishment may apply for a permanent registration. The registration certificate must be prominently displayed. The Chapter V details the creation of state and national level Register of Medical Establishment in digital form.

The Chapter VI details various offences and penalties. For example, running an unregistered establishment carries a fine up to ₹50,000 on the first offence. A person knowingly working in an unregistered establishment will be fined up to ₹25,000. There is also a fine of up to ₹500,000 for obstructing investigations, withholding information or giving false information. In case of violation by a corporate body, the management shall be held responsible.

== See also ==
- Health in India
- Drug policy of India

== News Topics ==
- Amendments to KPME Act: Good, bad or ugly? - Part 1
- KPME Act Amendments Part 2: The road to disaster is paved with good intentions
