= Indian Ports Act, 2025 =

Legislation in India

Parliament of India
- Long title: An Act to consolidate the law relating to ports, promote integrated port development, facilitate ease of doing business and ensure the optimum utilisation of India’s coastline; establish and empower State Maritime Boards for effective management of ports other than major ports; establish the Maritime State Development Council for fostering structured growth and development of the port sector; provide for the management of pollution, disaster, emergencies, security, safety, navigation, and data at ports; ensure compliance with India’s obligations under international instruments to which it is a party; take measures for the conservation of ports; provide for adjudicatory mechanisms for the redressal of port-related disputes; and address matters connected therewith or incidental thereto.
- Citation: No. 27 of 2025
- Passed by: Lok Sabha
- Passed: 12 August 2025
- Considered by: Rajya Sabha
- Passed: 18 August 2025
- Assented to by: President Droupadi Murmu
- Assented to: 21 August 2025

Legislative history

Initiating chamber: Lok Sabha
- Bill title: Indian Ports Bill, 2025
- Bill citation: Bill No. 65 of 2025
- Introduced by: Sarbananda Sonowal, Minister of Ports, Shipping and Waterways
- Introduced: 28 March 2025
- Passed: 12 August 2025

Revising chamber: Rajya Sabha
- Passed: 18 August 2025

Repeals
- Indian Ports Act, 1908 (15 of 1908)
- Status: In force

The Indian Ports Act, 2025 is an Act of the Parliament of India that replaced the colonial-era Indian Ports Act, 1908. It provides a modern legal framework for port governance in India, promoting integrated development, environmental protection, and cooperative federalism between the Centre and States.

== Background and Timeline ==
=== Background ===
The Act overhauls port sector regulation by repealing the Indian Ports Act, 1908, which governed both major and non-major ports for over a century. It forms part of a broader maritime legislative reform in 2025, alongside the Merchant Shipping Act, 2025 and the Carriage of Goods by Sea Act, 2025.

The Act creates a statutory framework for coordination between the Centre and coastal States, addresses environmental obligations under international conventions such as MARPOL, and introduces uniform tariff and safety standards across ports.

=== Timeline ===
- 28 March 2025: The Indian Ports Bill, 2025 was introduced in the Lok Sabha by the Ministry of Ports, Shipping and Waterways.
- 12 August 2025: The Indian Ports Bill, 2025 was passed by Lok Sabha.
- 1 April 2026: The Indian Ports Act, 2026 came into force.
- 21 July 2026: The government of India has notified Indian Ports Rules, 2026 on 21 July 2026.

== Provisions ==
=== Maritime State Development Council ===
The Act establishes the Maritime State Development Council chaired by the Union Minister for Ports, Shipping and Waterways, with membership including state ministers in charge of ports, naval and coast guard representatives, and senior officials. It advises on national port development plans, tariff transparency, and inter-state coordination.

=== State Maritime Boards ===
Each coastal State must establish a State Maritime Board to manage non-major ports. These boards have statutory powers for development planning, licensing, supervision of port works, tariff-setting, and ensuring compliance with environmental and safety norms.

=== Dispute Resolution ===
The Act mandates the constitution of Dispute Resolution Committees in each State to adjudicate port-related disputes involving non-major ports, concessionaires, service providers, and users, with appeals lying to the relevant High Court.

=== Safety, Environment and Compliance ===
Ports must establish waste reception facilities, comply with the MARPOL Convention and the Ballast Water Management Convention, prepare pollution control plans, and be subject to central audits. The Act prescribes penalties for safety violations, obstruction of navigation, and environmental damage.

=== Tariff Regulation ===
Port tariffs for major ports are set by their respective Boards of Major Port Authorities or boards of directors (if corporatised), while State Maritime Boards or authorised concessionaires set tariffs for non-major ports. All tariffs must be published electronically.

== See also ==
- Carriage of Goods by Sea Act, 2025
- Merchant Shipping Act, 2025
- Ministry of Ports, Shipping and Waterways
