= Anusandhan National Research Foundation Act, 2023 =

Act of the Parliament of India

Parliament of India
- Long title: An Act to provide for the registration and regulation of a financially research ecosystem, and open scientific research activities for the private sector in the India in accordance with the National Education Policy guideline.
- Enacted by: Parliament of India
- Assented to: 15 August 2023
- Commenced: 1 December 2023
- Bill citation: No. 25 2023
- Status: In force

The Anusandhan National Research Foundation Act, 2023 (ANRF) is an Act of the Parliament of India. It seeks to regulate all research and development in the fields of natural sciences, technology, agriculture, and health tech in India.

On 14 August 2023, the National Research Foundation (Registration and Regulation) Bill, 2023 was introduced in the Lok Sabha for the first time. The Act requires a financially research ecosystem, and open scientific research activities for the private sector in the India in accordance with the National Education Policy guideline. The ANRF replaces the Science and Engineering Research Board, established in 2008. Indian Prime Minister Narendra Modi chaired the first meeting of the Governing Board of Anusandhan National Research Foundation (ANRF), in New Delhi on 10 September, 2024.

== Definition ==
The legislate Act of Parliament defines The Anusandhan National Research Foundation Act, 2023 as follows:

An Act to establish the Anusandhan National Research Foundation to provide high level strategic direction for research, innovation and entrepreneurship in the fields of natural sciences including mathematical sciences, engineering and technology, environmental and earth sciences, health and agriculture, and scientific and technological interfaces of humanities and social sciences, to promote, monitor and provide support as required for such research and for matters connected therewith or incidental thereto.
