= Factoring Regulation Act, 2011 =

Act of the Parliament of India

The Factoring Regulation Act, 2011 is an Act of the Parliament of India to regulate factoring. The passage of the law had reportedly "almost gone unnoticed on account of other important Bills pending".
