= Metro Railway (Operations and Maintenance) Act, 2002 =

Parliament of India
- Long title: An Act to provide for the operation and maintenance and to regulate the working of the metro railway in the National Capital Region, metropolitan city and metropolitan area and for matters connected therewith and incidental thereto.
- Citation: Act No. 60 of 2002
- Territorial extent: India (except Kolkata)
- Passed by: Lok Sabha
- Passed: 25 November 2002
- Passed by: Rajya Sabha
- Passed: 12 December 2002
- Assented to: 17 December 2002
- Commenced: 29 October 2002

Legislative history

Initiating chamber: Lok Sabha
- Bill title: Delhi Metro Railway (Operation and Maintenance) Bill, 2002
- Introduced by: Ananth Kumar
- Introduced: 21 November 2002

Amended by
- The Metro Railways (Amendment) Act, 2009

Related legislation
- The Metro Railways (Construction of Works) Act, 1978; Delhi Metro Railway (Operation and Maintenance) Ordinance, 2002
- Status: Amended

The Metro Railway (Operations and Maintenance) Act, 2002, formerly the Delhi Metro Railway (Operation and Maintenance) Act, 2002, is an Act of the Parliament of India that governs the operations of metro rail systems in India. The law was first promulgated as an Ordinance on 29 October 2002. When it was first enacted in 2002, the Act applied only to the National Capital Territory of Delhi. It was amended in 2009 to permit the Central Government to extend the Act to any metropolitan city or area, after consultation with the concerned State Government. However, the amendment specifically prohibits the centre from extending the Act to the metropolitan city of Kolkata.

== Proposal and enactment ==
The Metro Railway (Operation and Maintenance) Act, 2002 was promulgated as an Ordinance titled the Delhi Metro Railway (Operation and Maintenance) Ordinance, 2002 by then President A. P. J. Abdul Kalam on 29 October 2002. The Delhi Metro Railway (Operation and Maintenance) Bill, 2002 (Bill No. 73 of 2002) was introduced in the Lok Sabha on 21 November 2002 by then Urban Development Minister Ananth Kumar, and was passed by that House on 25 November.

The bill was moved in the Rajya Sabha by Ananth Kumar on 2 December 2002. The bill was passed by a voice vote in the Rajya Sabha on 12 December. The bill received assent from then President A. P. J. Abdul Kalam on 17 December, and was notified in The Gazette of India on 18 December. It retroactively came into effect from 29 October 2002.

== Sections ==
The Act grants the Metro Railway Administrator (MRA) four main powers:

- to acquire, hold and dispose of all kinds of properties owned by it, both movable and immovable
- to improve, develop or alter any property or asset held by it
- to develop any Metro railway land for commercial use
- to execute any lease or grant any licence in respect of the property held by it

The Act requires the MRA to seek approval from the Railway Board whenever it rolls out services using a completely newly made train on the track. For example, the rolling stock on the Mumbai Metro required approval from the Railway Board before operations could begin. If the trains used on the metro system had at least the same dimensions as another operational metro in India, the approval would not have been required.

Section 6 of the Act gives the Metro Railway Administrator (MRA) vast powers to ensure immediate safety of the metro rail system. The MRA has the power to "acquire, hold and dispose of all kinds of properties owned by it, both movable and immovable". It includes the right to enter any land adjoining the metro railway alignment to remove obstructions which may obstruct the movement of the trains or obstruct the view of the signals. It also includes the right to erect hoardings as well as to use the metro property extensively for garnering advertising revenue.

Section 27 prohibits any person with a contagious disease or infection from travelling on the metro. The administrator has the right to remove such a person from its premises. Section 59 allows the MRA to act against people accused of drunken behaviour, nuisance, vandalism, or using abusive and obscene language. The section provides for a fine of ₹500 and expulsion of the offender from the metro service. Section 34 of the Act grants the power to fix the first set of fares without the interference of any outside body with the MRA. However, the subsequent revision of fares, will be decided by a three-member Fare Fixation Committee headed by a retired or sitting High Court judge. Section 60 prohibits passengers from carrying offensive material on the metro. Violation of this section is punishable by a fine of ₹500. The offender will also be held responsible for any injury or loss of life so caused by it.

Section 62 authorizes the MRA to, if it chooses, to remove any person from the metro if he is caught demonstrating against the metro within the metro premises. The passenger can be removed even if he has a ticket/pass. Pasting posters inside coaches etc. can attract a fine of ₹1,000 and/or 6 months imprisonment. Section 63 deals with rooftop travel. Any passenger doing so can be removed from the premises and also punished with a fine of ₹50 and/or one month imprisonment. Section 64 forbids the unlawful entry of persons into the metro premises or walking on the tracks illegally. Violation of the section is punishable by a fine of ₹500 and/or 6 months imprisonment. Section 67 allows for imprisonment of up to 4 years and a fine of ₹5,000 for any passenger obstructing the running of a train by squatting or picketing. Section 68 prescribes one year imprisonment and/or ₹1,000 fine for any passenger obstructing metro railway staff from discharging their duties.

Section 73 forbids the sale of any kind of articles inside the Metro coach or premises, without permission from the MRA. Violation of this section is punishable by a ₹500 fine and a jail term of 6 months. Section 74 pertains to sabotage. It permits authorities to imprison a person for anything between 3 years and life. In case the sabotage results in death and severe destruction, the death penalty can be invoked as well. Section 82 grants any MRA official or a policeman of head constable's rank or any other person authorised by the MRA, such the Maharashtra State Security Corporation personnel deployed for station security, the power to arrest, even without warrant. Section 86 of the Act maintains that the central government from time to time can issue directions on "issues of policy" which would be binding on the MRA. Section 90 of the Act declares all employees of the MRA as public servants as defined by Section 21 of the Indian Penal Code (IPC).

== 2009 amendment ==
The Act was amended in 2009. The amendment bill titled The Metro Railways (Amendment) Bill, 2009 Bill No. 64-C of 2009.

== Metro Rail Policy 2017 ==
Metro Rail Policy 2017 lays down norms and guidelines for development of Metro Rail projects and conditions for approvals and aids to be provided by Union government for these projects. Metro rail projects will be approved and aided by Union government only if there is private participation and the projects ensures last-mile connectivity for commuters.

== See also ==
- Rapid transit in India
- Metro Railways Act, 1978
