= Interest-tax Act, 1974 =

Parliament of India
- Long title: An Act to impose a special tax on interest in certain cases.
- Citation: Act No. 45 of 1974
- Territorial extent: whole of India
- Enacted by: Parliament of India
- Enacted: 23 September 1974
- Abrogated: 31 March 2000
- Status: Abrogated

The Interest-tax Act, 1974 was an Act that imposed a special tax on interest accrued in specified cases. The Act applied to the whole of India, including all the States and Union Territories with no exceptions. The Act is no longer applicable with regard to chargeable interest accruing after 31 March 2000.

== Interest Tax Act ==
The Interest Tax Act of 1974 governs the tax process associated with the imposition and collection of Interest Tax in situations specified under its various sections.

The Act applies to all Scheduled Banks that are required to pay tax on the chargeable interest amounts they have on their deposits.

This Interest Tax is required to be charged at the rate of 7% (Seven per cent) of the amount of chargeable interest. This was modified to 3.5% (Three and a half per cent) for Interest accrued since 31 March 1983, 3% (Three per cent) subject to certain conditions since 31 March 1992, 2% (Two per cent) since 31 March 1997, and no Interest Tax accruing or arising after 31 March 2000.all over India in govt tax 15.5% total act of 1974 adhiniyam to in India

== Chargeable Interest ==
As per the Interest Tax Act, the chargeable interest that applied to a credit institution was the total amount of interest apart from interest charged on loans and advances made to different credit institutions.

The Interest Tax Act also does not apply to any Cooperative Society engaged in the banking business.

== Penalty for concealment of chargeable interest ==
The Interest Tax Act has specified a penalty for concealment of the details regarding chargeable interest or the furnishing of incorrect details regarding the amount of chargeable interest.

In such circumstances, the Assessing Officer or the Commissioner of Appeals may impose, in addition to payment of the interest tax payable, a penalty up to three times of the total Interest Tax that has been either concealed or furnished incorrectly.
