= Metro Railways (Construction of Works) Act, 1978 =

Parliament of India
- Long title: An Act to provide for the construction of works relating to metro railways in the metropolitan cities and for matter connected therewith.
- Citation: Act No. 33 of 1978
- Territorial extent: India
- Passed by: Lok Sabha
- Passed: 26 July 1978
- Passed by: Rajya Sabha
- Passed: 3 August 1978
- Assented to: 21 August 1978
- Commenced: 1 February 1979

Legislative history

Initiating chamber: Lok Sabha
- Bill title: The Metro Railways (Construction of Works) Bill, 1978
- Introduced: 12 May 1978

Amended by
- The Metro Railways (Construction of Works) Amendment Act, 1982; The Metro Railways (Amendment) Act, 2009

Related legislation
- Metro Railway (Operation and Maintenance) Act, 2002
- Status: Amended

The Metro Railways (Construction of Works) Act, 1978 is an act of the Parliament of India that governs the construction of works relating to metro railways in the metropolitan cities in the country. When it was enacted in 1978, the Act applied in the first instance to the metropolitan city of Calcutta (now Kolkata). The Act also empowered the Central Government to, by notification in The Gazette of India, extend the Act to any other metropolitan city. This provision has been utilized in subsequent years to extend the Act to other metro railway systems in the country.

== Proposal and enactment ==
The Metro Railways (Construction of Works) Bill, 1978 (Bill No. 87 of 1978) was introduced in the Lok Sabha on 12 May 1978, and passed by that House on 26 July. The Bill was passed by the Rajya Sabha on 3 August 1978. The bill received assent from then President Neelam Sanjiva Reddy on 21 August 1978. The Act came into force on 1 February 1979.

== Amendments ==
=== 1982 ===
The Metro Railways Act was amended in 1982. The amendment act is named The Metro Railways (Construction of Works) Amendment Act, 1982 (Act No. 41 of 1982). The Metro Railways (Construction of Works) Amendment, Bill, 1981 (Bill No. 165 of 1981) was introduced in the Lok Sabha on 22 December 1981, and passed by that House on the same day. It was passed by the Rajya Sabha on 7 August 1982. The Bill received assent from then President Zail Singh on 21 August 1982. It was notified in The Gazette of India on 6 May 1983, and came into force on 15 May 1983.

=== 2009 ===
The Act was amended for a second time in 2009. The amendment bill titled The Metro Railways (Amendment) Bill, 2009 (Bill No. 64-C of 2009) was passed by the Lok Sabha on 6 August 2009.

== See also ==
- Metro Railway (Operations and Maintenance) Act, 2002
- Rapid transit in India
