= Arya Marriage Validation Act, 1937 =

Imperial Legislative Council
- Long title: An Act to recognise and remove doubts as to the validity of inter-marriages current among Arya Samajists.
- Citation: Act No. 19 of 1937
- Territorial extent: India
- Enacted by: Imperial Legislative Council
- Enacted: 14 April 1937
- Status: In force

The Arya Marriage Validation Act, 1937 (Act No. 19 of 1937) is a legislation enacted by the British government in India during the pre-independence era to recognise inter marriages among Arya Samajis.

== Background ==
Arya Samajis, who formed an appreciable number of Hindu Indians, believed that the Hindu caste system prevailing in British-ruled India was not in consonance with Hinduism's sacred scriptures. British never tried to interfere with the customary marriage laws prevailing among different sects of the society. However, people from various sects, who opposed the caste system adopted concept of Arya Samaj and became Arya Samajis. Marriages took place between the Arya Samajis irrespective of the fact that prior to the marriage both the bride and bridegroom belonged to different castes or sub-castes or religion other than Hindu. As such they feared that these marriages could be declared invalid solely on the point that the parties before the marriage belonged to different castes between whom marriage was not permissible as per the custom prevailing at that time.

In order to address such an issue the select committee proposed a legislation which was enacted in order to validate all such marriages and recognise the marriage between two Arya Samajis as valid.

== Text of sec.2 of the act ==
Section 2 of the act was meant to validate all such marriages between Arya Samajis and this is the only substantial provision of the act:

Marriage between Arya Samajis not to be invalid: Notwithstanding any provision of Hindu Law, usage or custom to the contrary no marriage contracted whether before or after the commencement of this Act between two persons being at the time of marriage Arya Samajis shall be invalid or shall be deemed ever to have been invalid by reason only of the fact that the parties at any time belonged to different castes or different sub-castes of Hindus or that either or both of the parties at any time before the marriage belonged to a religion other than Hinduism.
