= Expenditure-tax Act, 1987 =

Indian legislation

Parliament of India
- Long title: An Act to provide for the levy of a tax on expenditure incurred in certain hotels or restaurants and for matters connected therewith or incidental thereto.
- Citation: Act No. 35 of 1987
- Territorial extent: whole of India
- Enacted by: Parliament of India
- Assented to by: President
- Assented to: 14 September 1987
- Commenced: 1 November 1987

Amends
- Central Boards of Revenue Act, 1963 (54 of 1963); Economic Offences (Inapplicability of Limitation) Act,1974 (12 of 1974)

Amended by
- List: Finance Act, 1988 (Act 26 of 1988); Finance (No. 2) Act, 1991 (Act 49 of 1991); Finance Act, 1992 (Act 18 of 1992); Finance Act, 1994 (Act 32 of 1994); Finance Act, 1997 (Act 26 of 1997); Finance (No. 2) Act, 1998 (Act 21 of 1998); Finance Act, 1999 (Act 27 of 1999); Repealing and Amending Act, 2001 (Act 30 of 2001); Finance Act, 2002 (Act 20 of 2002); Finance Act, 2003 (Act 32 of 2003); Taxation Laws (Amendment) Act, 2003 (Act 54 of 2003); National Tax Tribunal Act, 2005 (Act 49 of 2005)
- Status: In force

The Expenditure-tax Act, 1987 is an Act of the Parliament of India. It applies to any charges incurred by an individual and in the event that these charges are implied to be chargeable expenditure. The Act is applicable to all the States and Union Territories in India.

== History ==
The expenditure tax was first introduced by T. T. Krishnamachari (then Finance Minister) in 1957. After being abolished in 1962 by Morarji Desai, it was brought again in 1964. It was finally abolished in 1966 after which Chaudhary Charan Singh tried to bring it again in 1979 but failed.

== Expenditure Tax Act ==
The Expenditure-tax Act, 1987 governs the taxation process associated with the chargeable expenditure incurred by an individual in a certain hotel or restaurant.

The Act applies to chargeable expenditure provided the following criteria are fulfilled

1. If the charges are incurred in a hotel where the room charges for an accommodation is INR 3000 per day or in excess of this amount
2. The charges are incurred in a restaurant

In case of the rooms charges the Assessing Officer of the Income Tax Department has the freedom to decide whether the charges are mentioned in the right manner along with other respective charges such as food, drinks, and other services. In the event that a discrepancy is found in the breakup of charges the Assessing Officer is given the right to decide on the amount required to be charged as room charges.

== Value of Expenditure Tax applicable ==
The Expenditure Tax taxable under this Act is charged at

- 10% (Ten percent) of the charges incurred at a hotel as long as the hotel is as per Clause (1) of Section 3 of the Income Tax Act of 1961
- 15% (Fifteen percent) on charges incurred in a restaurant as long as the restaurant is as per Clause (2) of Section 3 of the Income Tax Act of 1961.

== Collection of expenditure tax ==
In the event that a hotel provides the services mentioned in Sub Clauses (a) to (d) of Clause (1) of Section 5, the amount of Expenditure Tax is to be recovered from the person carrying on the business.

In the event that a hotel provides the services mentioned in Sub Clause (b) or Sub Clause (d) of Clause (1) of Section 5, the amount of Expenditure Tax will be recovered from the other person referred to.

In the event that a restaurant as per Clause (2) of Section 3 and the services it renders are as per Clause (2) of Section 5. And said services are provided by the restaurant or the person carrying on business in the restaurant or by the other person, the Expenditure Tax will be collected at the rate specified in Clause (b) of Section 4.
