= Emigration Act, 1983 =

Parliament of India
- Long title: An Act to consolidate and amend the law relating to emigration of citizens of India.
- Citation: Act No. 31 of 1983
- Territorial extent: whole of India
- Passed by: Lok Sabha
- Passed: 12 August 1983
- Passed by: Rajya Sabha
- Passed: 25 August 1983
- Assented to by: President
- Assented to: 10 September 1983
- Commenced: 30 December 1983

Legislative history

Initiating chamber: Lok Sabha
- Bill title: Emigration Bill, 1983
- Introduced by: Veerendra Patil, Minister of Labour and Rehabilitation
- Introduced: 10 August 1983
- Passed: 12 August 1983

Revising chamber: Rajya Sabha
- Member(s) in charge: Veerendra Patil, Minister of Labour and Rehabilitation
- Passed: 25 August 1983

Repeals
- Emigration Act, 1922
- Status: In force

The Emigration Act, 1983 is an Act passed by the Government of India to regulate emigration of people from India, with the stated goal of reducing fraud or exploitation of Indian workers recruited to work overseas. The Act imposed a requirement of obtaining emigration clearance (also called POE clearance) from the office of Protector of Emigrants (POE), Ministry of External Affairs for people emigrating from India for work. As of 2017, this requirement applies only for people going to one of 18 listed countries.

== Background ==
Indians emigrated, both temporarily and permanently, to a number of countries, including the United States, United Kingdom, Germany, Canada, Australia, and the economies of Southeast Asia. The bulk of emigration from the 1970s onward was to the Arab states of the Persian Gulf. Recruiting agents played a role in connecting workers to foreign jobs and charged the workers or the employers some share of the revenue. The Emigration Act, 1983 was passed to address concerns related to defrauding and exploitation of workers by the recruiting agents and other problems they might face upon going abroad.

== Provisions ==
=== Creation of the office of Protector of Emigrants (Chapter II) ===
Chapter II, Section 3 of the Act provided that the Central Government may appoint a Protector General of Emigrants and as many Protectors of Emigrants (POE) as it sees fit, as well as their respective areas of operation. Later Sections of Chapter II defined the duties of Protectors of Emigrants in more detail, provided for emigration check-points, and provided for other emigration officers.

=== Registration of recruiting agents (Chapter III) ===
The Act made the Protector General of Emigrants and other Protectors of Emigrants the authorities who could register recruiting agents. A person could operate as a recruiting agent for emigrants only if registered. The Act also provided details on the application, terms and conditions, renewal, and cancellation of registration.

=== Permits for recruitment by employers (Chapter IV) ===
All employers were required to recruit either through a recruiting agent with a valid registration, or obtain a permit for recruitment. The procedure for obtaining, validity period, and cancellation of permits was detailed in the law.

=== Emigration clearance (Chapter V) ===
Any citizen of India seeking to emigrate was required to have emigration clearance from the Protectorate of Emigrants (POE). The application process for emigration clearance, and potential grounds for rejection, were detailed.

As of 2017, passport holders could either have ECR status (emigration check required) in which case they need to obtain emigration clearance, or have ECNR status (emigration check not required) in which case they do not need to obtain emigration clearance. The ECR/ECNR distinction does not appear to have been stated in the original language of the Emigration Act, 1983, which seems to suggest that anybody emigrating for work is required to obtain emigration clearance. The requirements for getting to ECNR status have been progressively relaxed over time, starting from being restricted to people such as graduates and income tax payers and now applying to a much wider set of people including those who have completed matriculation (class 10 of school).

=== Other provisions ===
- Chapter VI described the appeals process
- Chapter VII provided details on offences and penalties
- Chapter VIII covered miscellaneous items
