= State of Arunachal Pradesh Act =

Indian legislation

State of Arunachal Pradesh Act, 1986

Parliament of India
- Long title: An Act to provide for the establishment of the State of Arunachal Pradesh and for matters connected therewith
- Citation: Act No. 69 of 1986
- Enacted by: Parliament of India
- Assented to by: President Zail Singh
- Assented to: 24 December 1986
- Commenced: 20 February 1987
- Status: In force

The State of Arunachal Pradesh Act, 1986 is an act of the Parliament of India that provided for the establishment of the State of Arunachal Pradesh. It was enacted as Act No. 69 of 1986 and came into force on 20 February 1987.

== Background ==
Prior to the act, Arunachal Pradesh was a Union Territory. The act was passed to grant full statehood and to meet the political and administrative aspirations of the region.

== Provisions ==
The act provided for:

- Establishment of the State of Arunachal Pradesh from the existing Union Territory.
- Representation in Parliament and creation of a Legisllative Assembly.
- Provisions relating to governance, judiciary, and distribution of assets and liabilities.

The act marked the transition of Arunachal Pradesh into a full fledged state of Indfia, strengthening federal governance and administrative development in the northeastern region.

== See also ==
- North-Eastern Areas (Reorganisation) Act, 1971
