= Banking Regulation Act, 1949 =

Banking act of India

The Banking regulation Act, 1949

Parliament of India
- Long title: An Act to consolidate and amend the law relating to banking
- Citation: Act No. 10 of 1949
- Territorial extent: Whole of India
- Enacted by: Parliament of India
- Enacted: 10 March 1949

Amended by
- Banking Regulation (Amendment) Bill, 2020
- Status: In force

The Banking Regulation Act, 1949 is a law in India that regulates all banking companies in India. Passed as the Banking Companies Act 1949, it came into force on 16 March 1949 and changed to Banking Regulation Act 1949 from 1 March 1966. It is applicable in Jammu and Kashmir from 1956. Initially, the law was applicable only to banking companies. But, in 1965 it was amended to make it applicable to cooperative banks and to introduce other changes. In 2020 it was amended to bring the cooperative banks under the supervision of the Reserve Bank of India (RBI).

== Overview ==
The Act provides a framework for the regulation of commercial banking in India. It supplements the Companies Act, 1956. Primary Agricultural Credit Society and cooperative land mortgage banks are excluded from the Act.

The Act gives the RBI the power to license banks, have regulation over shareholding and voting rights of shareholders; supervise the appointment of the boards and management; regulate the operations of banks; lay down instructions for audits; control moratorium, mergers and liquidation; issue directives in the interests of public good and on banking policy, and impose penalties.

In 1965, the Act was amended to include cooperative banks under its purview by adding the Section 56. Cooperative banks, which operate only in one state, are formed and run by the state government. But, RBI controls the licensing and regulates the business operations. The Banking Act was a supplement to the previous acts related to banking.

== Amendments ==
In 2020, Finance Minister Nirmala Sitaraman introduced a bill to amend the Act. The bill sought to bring all cooperative banks under the Reserve Bank of India. It brought 1,482 urban and 58 multi-state cooperative banks under the supervision of the RBI.nstruct or merge banks without moratoriums. The bill was passed by the parliament.

== See also ==
- Banking in India
- Public Debt Act, 1944
- Reserve Bank of India Act, 1934
