= Insurance Act, 1938 =

Indian insurance law

Imperial Legislative Council
- Long title: An Act to consolidate and amend the law relating to the business of insurance.
- Citation: Act No. 4 of 1938
- Territorial extent: India
- Enacted: 26 February 1938
- Commenced: 1 July 1939

Amended by
- List: Insurance (Amendment) Act, 1939; Insurance (Second Amendment) Act, 1939; Insurance (Amendment) Act, 1940; Insurance (Amendment) Act, 1941; Insurance (Amendment) Act, 1944; Insurance (Amendment) Act, 1946; Insurance (Amendment) Act, 1948; Insurance (Amendment) Act, 1950; Insurance (Amendment) Act 1955; Insurance (Second Amendment) Act 1955; Insurance (Amendment) Act 1957; Insurance (Amendment) Act, 1961; Insurance (Amendment) Act, 1965; Insurance (Amendment) Act, 2002; Insurance Laws (Amendment) Act, 2015; Insurance (Amendment) Act, 2021
- Status: In force (amended)

The Insurance Act, 1938 is a law originally passed in 1938 in British India to regulate the insurance sector. It provides the broad legal framework within which the industry operates.

== History ==
Prior to the law, only the Marine Insurance Act, 1906 of England existed in British India but it only applied to marine insurance. For other insurance, the British common law was applied. This law passed in 1938 borrowed heavily from the British law and covered all sorts of insurance. In 1963, a new Marine Insurance Act for independent India was passed. This also borrowed heavily from the English Marine Insurance Act, 1906. The Insurance Act had resulted in the formation of Controller of Insurance, a regulatory authority. But following the nationalisation of major insurance companies in India, under Life Insurance of India Corporation Act, 1956 and General Insurance Business (Nationalisation) Act, 1972, its importance diminished. However, as India began allowing private companies again in the insurance sector, Insurance Regulatory and Development Authority of India was formed in 1999.

== Summary ==
The Insurance Act has 120 sections and 8 schedules. Under it, only an Indian company, as defined and registered under Companies Act, 1956, is allowed to operate in India. Its foreign entity-owned equity should not exceed 49% as of 2015. It must have a licence from Insurance Regulatory and Development Authority of India.

== See also ==
- Insurance in India
- Insurance Regulatory and Development Authority of India
