= Section 5 of the Constitution of Australia =

Section 5 of the Constitution of Australia empowers the Governor-General of Australia to prorogue the Australian Parliament, thereby bringing the current legislative session to an end. Prorogation clears all business pending before Parliament and allows the houses to be called back on a particular date without triggering an election. The date for the new session of Parliament may be specified either in the proroguing proclamation or when the governor-general summons the Parliament to meet again.

== Text ==
The full text of the section is:

5. Sessions of Parliament.

The Governor-General may appoint such times for holding the sessions of the Parliament as he thinks fit, and may also from time to time, by Proclamation or otherwise, prorogue the Parliament, and may in like manner dissolve the House of Representatives.

Summoning Parliament After any general election the Parliament shall be summoned to meet not later than thirty days after the day appointed for the return of the writs.

First session

The Parliament shall be summoned to meet not later than six months after the establishment of the Commonwealth.

== 20th century prorogations in Australia ==
Prior to 1977, it was common for the Commonwealth Parliament to have up to three sessions, with Parliament being prorogued at the end of each session and recalled at the beginning of the next. This was not always the case, for instance the 10th Parliament (1926-1928) went full term without prorogation. The practice of having multiple sessions in the same Parliament gradually fell into disuse, and all Parliaments from 1978 to 2013 had a single session. Between 1961 and the turn of the century, prorogations only occurred three times – in 1968 to allow a new ministry to be formed following the death of Harold Holt, and in 1974 and 1977 to allow Queen Elizabeth II to officially open a new session of Parliament.

Since 1990, it has been the practice for the Parliament to be prorogued on the same day that the House is dissolved so that the Senate will not be able to sit during the election period.

== 2016 prorogation and recall of Parliament ==
The Turnbull government relied on section 5 to reconvene the Australian Senate a week early on 3 May 2016, despite a majority of Senators having voted not to reconvene before 10 May 2016. This forced the Senate (in which the government lacked a majority) to reconvene and consider legislation that could serve as triggers for a double dissolution before the 2016 Australian federal election, which otherwise may not have been considered before that election.

== See also ==
- Chronology of Australian federal parliaments
- Legislative session
- Prorogation in Canada
