= North-Eastern Areas (Reorganisation) Act, 1971 =

Act of the Parliament of India

Parliament of India
- Long title: An Act to provide for the establishment of the States of Manipur and Tripura and to provide for the formation of the State of Meghalaya and of the Union territories of Mizoram and Arunachal Pradesh by reorganisation of the existing State of Assam and for matters connected therewith.
- Enacted by: Parliament of India
- Enacted: 30 December 1971
- Status: In force

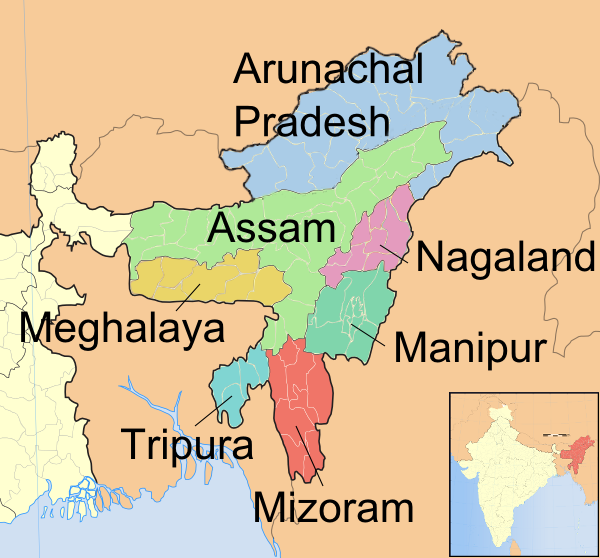
Map of Northeast India after the passage of the act

The North-Eastern Areas (Reorganisation) Act, 1971 was a major reform of the boundaries of India's North-East region into States and union territories.

== Effect of the changes ==
- Establishment of the states of Manipur and Tripura. They were union territories before.
- Establishment of the state of Meghalaya. It was an autonomous part of Assam before.
- Establishment of the union territories of Mizoram and Arunachal Pradesh.
- Reduction of the area of the state of Assam due to the above changes.
- Allocation of Lok Sabha and Rajya Sabha seats for the newly created territories.
- Allocation of seats to the Legislative Assemblies of the newly created territories.
- While the original 1971 act provided for common High Courts for Assam, Nagaland, Meghalaya, Manipur and Tripura, the 2012 amendment led to creation of separate High Courts for Meghalaya, Manipur and Tripura in March 2013.
- Creation of a new, common High Court for the rest of the modified territories

== Later Territorial changes ==
- Following the Mizoram Peace Accord in 1986, Mizoram was made an Indian state in 1987.
- Arunachal Pradesh was given full statehood by the State of Arunachal Pradesh Act, 1986.

== See also ==
- Administrative divisions of India
- Constitution of India
- Jammu and Kashmir Reorganisation Act, 2019
- Punjab Reorganisation Act, 1966
- States and union territories of India
- States Reorganisation Act, 1956
