= Section 5 of the Indian Limitation Act =

Indian law

Section 5 of the Indian Limitation Act, 1963 (Act 36 of 1963) is an enabling provision to assist the litigants who failed to do an act within the prescribed time period as originally fixed under various enactments. Whether Section 5 of the Indian Limitation Act, 1963 will be applicable to the Execution Proceedings instituted under the Code of Civil Procedure, 1908 (Act 9 of 1908).

== Introduction ==
Section 5 of the Indian Limitation Act, 1963 (Act 36 of 1963) is an enabling provision to assist the litigants who failed to do an act within the prescribed time period as originally fixed under the various enactments. For example, a litigant who failed to file an Appeal before the superior courts within the permissible time period as originally fixed then he can file it after the expiry of the prescribed time period provided he has to show “sufficient cause” for non-filing the Appeal within the time period. Likewise while running a case either before the subordinates’ courts or any superior courts; the litigants have to file necessary applications under various enactments for smooth running of the case, but if such applications has not been filed in-time then he can file it later on provided he has shown “sufficient cause” for late filing of the same. Recently the Supreme Court of India has held that Law of Limitation may harshly effect a particular party but it has to be applied with all its Rigour read more

== Non-application of Section 5 to certain cases ==
- The Section 5 of the Indian Limitation Act, 1963 is applicable only to the situation where the suit is already filed and pending for disposal. When no suit has been filed within the stipulated time, this provision is not applicable to get an extension of time period for filing the same. Appeal or applications can be filed in the pending suit.
- Likewise this provision is applicable only to the proceedings which are exclusively pending before the Courts and it is not applicable to the proceedings pending before any Tribunals because mostly the Tribunals shall be constituted only by an act of Special Laws which prescribes all mode of remedies and it never borrows any provisions from outside sources and to put it in other words such Special Laws can be called as “Self-contained Enactments”. For example, Rent Control Acts, Banking Tribunals, Income Tax Tribunals, Land Acquisition Act, etc.,
- Likewise for the enforcement of the Decrees, Orders passed by the court of law the litigants has to file an Execution Petition before the Executing Court by exercising the provisions as enshrined under the Chapter Execution in Part II (Sections 36 to 74) with the aid of Order XXI of the First Schedule of Code of Civil Procedure, 1908 (5 of 1908). For filing such an Execution Petition Section 5 of the Indian Limitation Act, 1963 is strictly not applicable because the Execution Petition should be filed within the time-period as originally fixed under the Enactments failing which the litigants/Decree-Holder in the eyes of law had exhausted his lawful remedies as such he cannot thereafter enforcing his rights as enshrined under the Decrees, Orders, etc., passed by the Courts in his favour.

== Gist of Section 5 of the Indian Limitation Act, 1963 ==
Section 5 of the Indian Limitation Act, 1963 which runs as follows:

5. Extension of prescribed period in certain cases: Any appeal or any application, other than an application under any of the provisions of Order XXI of the Code of Civil Procedure, 1908 (5 of 1908), may be admitted after the prescribed period, if the appellant or the applicant satisfies the court that he had sufficient cause for not preferring the appeal or making the application within such period.

Explanation: The fact that the appellant or the applicant was misled by any order, practice or judgment of the High Court in ascertaining or computing the prescribed period may be sufficient cause within the meaning of this section.

== Gist of Rule 105 of Order XXI of Code of Civil Procedure, 1908 ==
Rule 105: Hearing of application: (1) The Court, before which an application under any of the foregoing rules of this Order is pending, may fix a day for the hearing of the application.
(2) Where on the day fixed or on any other day to which the hearing may be adjourned the applicant does not appear when the case is called on for hearing, the Court may make an order that the application be dismissed.
(3) Where the applicant appears and the opposite party to whom the notice has been issued by the Court does not appear, the Court may hear the application exparte and pass such order as it thinks fit.

Explanation: An application referred to in sub-rule (1) includes a claim or objection made under rule 58.

Thereafter a proviso was added to sub-rule (3) by way of an Amendment made by the Madras High Court which was published by the Tamil Nadu Government Gazette dated 27-02-1972, Part V, Page 1523 which is applicable to both Tamil Nadu and Puducherry Courts and the proviso which runs as follows: “Provided that an application may be admitted after the said period of thirty days if the applicant satisfies the Court that he had sufficient cause for not making the application within such period”

== Amendments made to Code of Civil Procedure ==
A major amendment was made to the Code of Civil Procedure, 1908 (5 of 1908) by way of Amendment Act 104 of 1976, Amendment Act 46 of 1999 and Amendment Act 22 of 2002 and all those Amendment Acts in its “Repeal and Savings Clauses” clearly specifics that any amendment made or any provision inserted in the principal Act by a State Legislature or High Court shall also stand repealed, except insofar as it is consistent with the provisions of the principal Act.

So again a doubt arises that what is meant by “Principal Act” with reference to the Code of Civil Procedure, 1908 (5 of 1908) for which lot of judicial pronouncements are there which unanimously held that “Principal Act” which refers only to the "body of the Code" or the "Sections Part of the Code" and not to the First Schedule of the Code of Civil Procedure, 1908.

As such in view of Section 122 of the Code of Civil Procedure, 1908 the High Courts have the powers to annul, alter or add to all or any of the rules in the First Schedule of Code of Civil Procedure, 1908 and it implies that the High Courts have not powers to amend the "body of the Code" or the "Sections Part of the Code"....

== Collaborative discussions ==
In view of the Amendments made to the First Schedule of the Code of Civil Procedure, 1908 (5 of 1908) which discusses the Orders and Rules for implementing the Act among which a Proviso to sub-rule (3) of Rule 105 of Order XXI which paves ways to the defaulting litigants who satisfies the Court that he had “sufficient cause” for not making the application within the prescribed period.

So Section 5 of the Indian Limitation Act, 1963 which strictly prohibits from entertaining any application under this Section before the Executing Court which implies in its words that, “Any appeal or any application, other than an application under any of the provisions of Order XXI of the Code of Civil Procedure, 1908 (5 of 1908)" as such the Madras High Court has made an Amendment to the Code of Civil Procedure, 1908 thereby a new Proviso was added to sub-rule (3) to Rule 105 of Order XXI (vide Tamil Nadu Government Gazette dated 27-02-1972, Part V, Page 1523) which paves ways to the defaulting litigants who satisfies the Court that he had “sufficient cause” for not making the application within the prescribed period as held by the Hon’ble Madras High Court in its landmark decision dated 12-08-2011 in N.Rajendran Vs. Shriram Chits Tamil Nadu Private Limited, rep. by its Branch Manager which is reported in [2011 (5) Madras Law Weekly 174].

== Conclusion ==
As mandated under Section 5 of the Indian Limitation Act, 1963 (Act 36 of 1963) no application would be maintainable before the Executing Court under this provision as such it is clearly concluded that Section 5 of the Indian Limitation Act, 1963 is strictly non-applicable to Execution Proceedings and the aggrieving party who lost his rights by way of his default may seek remedy under the provisions of the Code of Civil Procedure, 1908 (5 of 1908) itself since it seems to be a “Self-contained Enactment” for every exigencies arisen thereof.
