= Indian Tolls (Army and Air Force) Act, 1901 =

Constitution of India

Imperial Legislative Council
- Long title: An Act to amend the law relating to the exemption from tolls of persons and property belonging to the Army or Air Force
- Citation: Act No. 2 of 1901
- Enacted by: Imperial Legislative Council
- Enacted: 22 February 1901
- Commenced: 1 April 1901
- Status: In force (amended)

The Indian Tolls (Army and Air Force) Act, 1901 is a Law enacted by the Imperial Legislative Council to deal with exemption of toll charges where applicable for regular armed forces including all family members of Indian Armed Forces extending from Indian Army to Central Armed Police Forces. In the wake of new legislation and policy formulation, the act was later revised by the Ministry of Road Transport and Highways to disassociate the exemptions for family members from the provision of section 3 and 4 and those only "on duty" would be entitled for the exemption and does not pertain to the retired personnel.

== Purpose ==
1. The purpose of Indian Tolls (Army and Air Force) Act, 1901, extends to the entire territories and states administered by India.
2. As stated in the revised Act, there will be exemption available when traveling in personal vehicles, even used for official purposes like discharging an armed official for duty.
3. All regular or in-service officers (except retired personnels) ranking from juniors to seniors whether they belong to Navy, Air force, or land-based branch are liable to exempt for all tolls".

== Penalty ==
Any person whether they are road and transport officials or belonging to their respective branches of Road tax, if demands toll exempted in provisions of section 3 or section 4 "shall be punishable with fine which may extend to fifty rupees".

== Compensation ==
If compensation claims are made by any owner, company, railways administration or local authority for any loss alleged to have been incurred to the operation of this Act, the claim shall be submitted to the central government.
