= Majority Act, 1875 =

Indian law determining age of majority

Indian Majority Act, 1875

Imperial Legislative Council
- Long title: An Act to amend the law respecting the age of majority.
- Enacted by: Imperial Legislative Council
- Status: In force

The Majority Act, 1875 (Indian Majority Act, 1875 earlier) As per section 3(1) of the Indian Majority Act, 1875 every person domiciled in India shall attain the age of majority on completion of 18 years and not before. Unless a particular personal law specifies otherwise, every person domiciled in India is deemed to have attained majority upon completion of 18 years of age. Section 3(2) states that in computing the age of any person, the day on which he was born is to be included as a whole day and he shall be deemed to have attained majority at the beginning of the eighteenth anniversary of that day. But if the child born is appointed a guardian or he/she is under court of wards then he/she attains majority after his completion of 21 years of age.
