= Merchant Shipping Act, 2025 =

Legislation in India

Parliament of India
- Long title: An Act to consolidate and amend the law relating to merchant shipping to ensure compliance with India’s obligation under the maritime treaties and international instruments to which India is a party and also to ensure the development of Indian shipping and efficient maintenance of Indian mercantile marine in a manner best suited to serve the national interest and for matters connected therewith or incidental thereto.
- Citation: Act No. 24 of 2025
- Territorial extent: India
- Passed by: Lok Sabha
- Passed: 6 August 2025
- Passed by: Rajya Sabha
- Passed: 11 August 2025
- Assented to by: President
- Assented to: 18 August 2025

Legislative history

Initiating chamber: Lok Sabha
- Bill title: Merchant Shipping Bill, 2024
- Bill citation: Bill No. 183C of 2024
- Introduced by: Sarbananda Sonowal, Minister of Ports, Shipping and Waterways
- Introduced: 10 December 2024
- Passed: 6 August 2025

Revising chamber: Rajya Sabha
- Passed: 11 August 2025

Amends
- Marine Aids to Navigation Act, 2021

Repeals
- Merchant Shipping Act, 1958 (except Part XIV but not including sec 411A); Coasting Vessels Act, 1838
- Status: Not yet in force

The Merchant Shipping Act, 2025 is an Act of the Parliament of India that replaced the Merchant Shipping Act, 1958. The 2025 Act modernises India's maritime legal framework, aligns domestic law with International Maritime Organization (IMO) conventions, strengthens safety and environmental protections, improves seafarer welfare provisions, and simplifies regulatory procedures to enhance ease of doing business in the shipping sector.

== Background and timeline ==
=== Background ===
The Merchant Shipping Act, 1958 had become outdated and inconsistent with contemporary international shipping practice and IMO instruments. The Merchant Shipping Act, 2025 streamlines and consolidates merchant shipping law into 16 parts and 325 clauses, incorporating modern safety standards (including SOLAS), pollution controls (including MARPOL), ballast water management, and improved mechanisms for marine casualty investigation and seafarer protections.

=== Timeline ===
- 10 December 2024: The Merchant Shipping Bill, 2024 was introduced in Lok Sabha.
- 6 August 2025: The Merchant Shipping Bill, 2024 was passed by Lok Sabha.
- 11 August 2025: The Merchant Shipping Bill, 2024 passed by the Rajya Sabha.

== Provisions ==
=== Alignment with International Conventions ===
The Act incorporates India’s obligations under conventions of the International Maritime Organization, including the International Convention for the Safety of Life at Sea (SOLAS), the International Convention for the Prevention of Pollution from Ships (MARPOL), the Ballast Water Management Convention, and the Nairobi International Convention on the Removal of Wrecks.

=== Safety and Environmental Protection ===
It mandates pollution prevention measures, waste reception facilities, ballast water treatment systems, emergency preparedness plans, and periodic safety audits. The Act prescribes penalties for non-compliance with safety and environmental requirements.

=== Seafarer Welfare ===
The Act updates the framework for training, certification, service conditions, welfare measures, and dispute resolution mechanisms for seafarers, in line with the Maritime Labour Convention (MLC) standards.

=== Ship Registration and Ownership ===
It modernises vessel registration procedures, permits ownership of Indian-flagged vessels by Indian citizens, non-resident Indians (NRIs), overseas citizens of India (OCIs), Indian companies, and statutory bodies. Early registration is allowed for vessels under bareboat charter arrangements to boost Indian tonnage.

=== Ease of Doing Business ===
The Act enables electronic registration, digital certificates and agreements, simplified documentation, electronic payments, and risk-based port state control inspections to reduce delays and enhance operational efficiency.

=== Marine Casualty Investigation ===
It strengthens investigative powers for marine accidents, wreck removal, salvage operations, and apportionment of liabilities in maritime incidents.

== See also ==
- Indian Ports Act, 2025
