= Antiquities and Art Treasures Act, 1972 =

Parliament of India
- Long title: An Act to regulate the export trade in antiquities and art treasures, to provide for the prevention of smuggling of, and fraudulent dealings in, antiquities, to provide for the compulsory acquisition of antiquities and art treasures for preservation in public places and to provide for certain other matters connected therewith or incidental or ancillary thereto.
- Citation: Act No. 52 of 1972
- Territorial extent: India
- Enacted by: Parliament of India
- Enacted: 9 September 1972
- Assented to by: V. V. Giri
- Assented to: 9 September 1972
- Commenced: 5 April 1976 (except for Sikkim); 1 June 1979 (Sikkim)

Amends
- Ancient Monuments and Archaeological Sites and Remains Act, 1958

Repeals
- Antiquities (Export Control) Act, 1947

Amended by
- Antiquities and Art Treasures (Amendment) Act, 1976

Related legislation
- Antiquities and Art Treasures Rules, 1973
- Status: In force

The Antiquities and Art Treasures Act, 1972 was created in accordance with the UNESCO 1970 Convention to regulate the internal and external dealing in antiquities in India. Its purpose is to prevent the permanent export of India's treasures so as to preserve the country's cultural wealth.

== See also ==
- Indian Treasure Trove Act, 1878
