= National Textile Corporation =

Central Public Sector Undertaking

National Textile Corporation is a central public sector undertaking under the ownership of Ministry of Textiles, Government of India. It owns 23 working textile mills which produce yarn and fabric. The company was incorporated in April 1968.

NTC had made a turnaround within a short span to emerge as a debt-free company with a highly competitive revival strategy. Apart from re-branding, NTC had developed a new marketing and corporate strategy that included revamping of all NTC stores and setting up of new stores.

The National Textile Corporation Limited (NTC) was incorporated in April 1968 for managing the affairs of sick textile undertakings, in the private sector, taken over by the Government. Starting with 16 mills in 1968, this number gradually rose to 103 by 1972–73. In the year 1974 all these units were nationalised under the Sick Textile Undertakings (Nationalization) Act 1974. The number of units increased to 119 by 1995. These 119 mills were controlled by NTC(HC) Ltd with the help of 9 subsidiary Corporations, with an authorised capital of ₹100 million (US$1.0 million) which was raised from time to time and which is now ₹50 billion (US$520 million) and the paid up share capital of the corporation is ₹30,621.6 million (US$320 million) as on 31 March 2010.

Looking to the reduced number of mills and in line with the contemporary industry's trend all 9 subsidiary companies have been merged with NTC-HC making it into a single Company w.e.f. 1 April 2006. The present CMD is Shri Nihar Ranjan Dash.

NTC has so far closed 77 mills and has transferred 2 mills in the State of Pondicherry to the State Government of Pondicherry.

NTC is to modernise/set up 24 (22+2) mills by itself through generation of funds from the sale of its surplus assets and 16 (18–2) mills are to be revived through Joint Venture route.

NTC has modernised 18 mills so far and is in the process of setting up 3 Composite Textile Units of which one is an SEZ area. NTC would be setting up 1 Technical Textile Unit and modernising 2 more units taken out from the list of Joint Venture apart from going into Ginning & Garmenting by way of forward and backward integration to have a pressure in all components of the value chain.
