= Repealing and Amending Act =

Stock short title used for Indian legislation

Repealing and Amending Act is a stock short title which is used for acts of the Parliament of India and its predecessors such as the Imperial Legislative Council, Dominion Legislature and Provisional Parliament whose purpose is to repeal enactments which are no longer of practical utility or obsolete, redundant. As India follows Westminster system it requires periodic repealing.

== List ==
=== Acts of Imperial Legislative Council ===
- The Repealing and Amending Act, 1897 (5 of 1897)
- The Repealing and Amending Act, 1914 (10 of 1914)
- The Second Repealing and Amending Act, 1914 (17 of 1914)
- The Repealing and Amending Act, 1915 (11 of 1915)
- The Repealing and Amending Act, 1917 (24 of 1917)
- The Repealing and Amending Act, 1919 (18 of 1919)
- The Repealing and Amending Act, 1920 (31 of 1920)
- The Repealing and Amending Act, 1923 (11 of 1923)
- The Repealing and Amending Act, 1924 (7 of 1924)
- The Repealing and Amending Act, 1925 (37 of 1925)
- The Repealing And Amending Act, 1927 (10 of 1927)
- The Repealing and Amending Act, 1928 (18 of 1928)
- The Repealing and Amending Act, 1930 (8 of 1930)
- The Repealing and Amending Act, 1935 (12 of 1935)
- The Repealing and Amending Act, 1939 (34 of 1939)
- The Repealing and Amending Act, 1940 (32 of 1940)
- The Repealing and Amending Act, 1942 (25 of 1942)
- The Repealing and Amending Act, 1945 (6 of 1945)

=== Acts of the Dominion Legislature of India ===
- The Repealing and Amending Act, 1948 (2 of 1948)
- The Repealing and Amending act, 1949 (40 of 1949)

=== Act of the Provisional Parliament of India ===
- The Repealing and Amending Act, 1950 (35 of 1950)

=== Acts of the Parliament of India ===
- The Repealing and Amending Act, 1952 (48 of 1952)
- The Repealing and Amending Act, 1953 (42 of 1953)
- The Repealing and Amending Act, 1957 (36 of 1957)
- The Repealing and Amending Act, 1960 (58 of 1960)
- The Repealing and Amending Act, 1964 (52 of 1964)
- The Repealing and Amending Act, 1974 (56 of 1974)
- The Repealing and Amending Act, 1978 (38 of 1978)
- The Repealing and Amending Act, 1988 (19 of 1988)
- The Repealing and Amending Act, 2001 (30 of 2001)
- The Repealing and Amending Act, 2015 (17 of 2015)
- The Repealing and Amending (Second) Act, 2015 (19 of 2015)
- The Repealing and Amending Act, 2016 (23 of 2016)
- The Repealing and Amending Act, 2017 (2 of 2018)
- The Repealing and Amending (Second) Act, 2017 (4 of 2018)
- The Repealing and Amending Act, 2019 (31 of 2019)
- The Repealing and Amending Act, 2023 (37 of 2023)
- The Repealing and Amending Act, 2025 (37 of 2025)
