= Repealing and Amending Act, 2025 =

Act of the Parliament of India

Parliament of India
- Long title: An Act to repeal certain enactments and to amend certain other enactments.
- Citation: Act No. 37 of 2025
- Territorial extent: India
- Passed by: Lok Sabha
- Passed: 16 December 2025
- Passed by: Rajya Sabha
- Passed: 17 December 2025
- Assented to by: President Droupadi Murmu
- Assented to: 20 December 2025

Legislative history

Initiating chamber: Lok Sabha
- Bill title: The Repealing and Amending Bill, 2025
- Bill citation: Bill No. 193 of 2025
- Introduced by: MoL&J (I/C) Arjun Ram Meghwal
- Introduced: 15 December 2025
- Passed: 16 December 2025

Revising chamber: Rajya Sabha
- Passed: 17 December 2025

Amends
- 4 Acts

Repeals
- 71 Acts

Related legislation
- Repealing and Amending Act, 2015; Repealing and Amending (Second) Act, 2015; Repealing and Amending Act, 2016; Repealing and Amending Act, 2017; Repealing and Amending (Second) Act, 2017; Repealing and Amending Act, 2019; Repealing and Amending Act, 2023
- Status: Spent

The Repealing and Amending Act, 2025 is an Act of the Parliament of India that repealed 71 acts. It also made amendment to 4 acts. The Act was the eighth such repealing act aimed at repealing obsolete laws tabled by the Narendra Modi administration.

== Repealed Acts ==
Year	Act No.	Short title
1886	XI	The Indian Tramways Act, 1886
1976	31	The Levy Sugar Price Equalisation Fund Act, 1976
1978	41	The Britannia Engineering Company Limited (Mokameh Unit) and the Arthur Butler and Company (Muzaffarpore) Limited (Acquisition and Transfer of Undertakings) Act, 1978
1982	36	The Chaparmukh-Silghat Railway Line and the Katakhal-Lalabazar Railway Line (Nationalisation) Act, 1982
1984	55	The Hooghly Docking and Engineering Company Limited (Acquisition and Transfer of Undertakings) Act, 1984.
1988	44	The Bharat Petroleum Corporation Limited (Determination of Conditions of Service of Employees) Act, 1988
2016	3	The Arbitration and Conciliation (Amendment) Act, 2015
2017	1	The Payment of Wages (Amendment) Act, 2017
2017	3	The Enemy Property (Amendment and Validation) Act, 2017
2017	6	The Maternity Benefit (Amendment) Act, 2017
2017	11	The Employee’s Compensation (Amendment) Act, 2017
2017	30	The Banking Regulation (Amendment) Act, 2017
2018	7	The National Bank for Agriculture and Rural Development (Amendment) Act, 2018
2018	10	The High Court and Supreme Court Judges (Salaries and Conditions of Service) Amendment Act, 2018
2018	12	The Payment of Gratuity (Amendment) Act, 2018
2018	18	The Specific Relief (Amendment) Act, 2018
2018	19	The State Banks (Repeal and Amendment) Act, 2018
2018	20	The Negotiable Instruments (Amendment) Act, 2018
2018	28	The Commercial Courts, Commercial Division and Commercial Appellate Division of High Courts (Amendment) Act, 2018
2019	15	The Central Universities (Amendment) Act, 2019
2019	19	The Protection of Human Rights (Amendment) Act, 2019
2019	27	The Airports Economic Regulatory Authority of India (Amendment) Act, 2019
2019	32	The Motor Vehicles (Amendment) Act, 2019
2019	38	The National Institute of Design (Amendment) Act, 2019
2019	41	The Chit Funds (Amendment) Act, 2019
2019	43	The Special Protection Group (Amendment) Act, 2019
2019	48	The Arms (Amendment) Act, 2019
2020	1	The Insolvency and Bankruptcy Code (Amendment) Act, 2020
2020	4	The Constitution (Scheduled Tribes) Order (Amendment) Act, 2020
2020	13	The Aircraft (Amendment) Act, 2020
2020	17	The Insolvency and Bankruptcy Code (Second Amendment) Act, 2020
2020	18	The Salaries and Allowances of Ministers (Amendment) Act, 2020
2020	24	The Homoeopathy Central Council (Amendment) Act, 2020
2020	25	The Indian Medicine Central Council (Amendment) Act, 2020
2020	39	The Banking Regulation (Amendment) Act, 2020
2021	3	The Arbitration and Conciliation (Amendment) Act, 2021
2021	6	The Insurance (Amendment) Act, 2021
2021	8	The Medical Termination of Pregnancy (Amendment) Act, 2021
2021	15	The Government of National Capital Territory of Delhi (Amendment) Act, 2021
2021	21	The Factoring Regulation (Amendment) Act, 2021
2021	22	The Coconut Development Board (Amendment) Act, 2021
2021	26	The Insolvency and Bankruptcy Code (Amendment) Act, 2021
2021	27	The Central Universities (Amendment) Act, 2021
2021	28	The Airports Economic Regulatory Authority of India (Amendment) Act, 2021
2021	30	The Deposit Insurance and Credit Guarantee Corporation (Amendment) Act, 2021
2021	32	The Constitution (Scheduled Tribes) Order (Amendment) Act, 2021
2021	37	The General Insurance Business (Nationalisation) Amendment Act, 2021
2021	38	The National Commission for Indian System of Medicine (Amendment) Act, 2021
2021	39	The National Commission for Homoeopathy (Amendment) Act, 2021
2021	43	The National Institute of Pharmaceutical Education and Research (Amendment) Act, 2021
2021	44	The High Court and Supreme Court Judges (Salaries and Conditions of Service) Amendment Act, 2021
2021	49	The Election Laws (Amendment) Act, 2021
2022	8	The Constitution (Scheduled Castes and Scheduled Tribes) Orders (Amendment) Act, 2022
2022	9	The Constitution (Scheduled Tribes) Order (Amendment)Act, 2022
2022	10	The Delhi Municipal Corporation (Amendment) Act, 2022
2022	14	The Weapons of Mass Destruction and their Delivery Systems (Prohibition of Unlawful Activities) Amendment Act, 2022
2022	19	The Energy Conservation (Amendment) Act, 2022
2022	20	The Constitution (Scheduled Castes and Scheduled Tribes) Orders (Second Amendment) Act, 2022
2022	23	The New Delhi International Arbitration Centre (Amendment) Act, 2022
2023	1	The Constitution (Scheduled Tribes) Order (Second Amendment) Act, 2022
2023	2	The Constitution (Scheduled Tribes) Order (Fourth Amendment) Act, 2022
2023	9	The Competition (Amendment) Act, 2023
2023	11	The Multi-State Co-operative Societies (Amendment) Act, 2023
2023	12	The Cinematograph (Amendment) Act, 2023
2023	13	The Constitution (Scheduled Tribes) Order (Amendment) Act, 2023
2023	14	The Constitution (Scheduled Tribes) Order (Second Amendment) Act, 2023
2023	16	The Mines and Minerals (Development and Regulation) Amendment Act, 2023
2023	17	The Offshore Areas Mineral (Development and Regulation) Amendment Act, 2023
2023	19	The Government of National Capital Territory of Delhi (Amendment) Act, 2023
2023	27	The Coastal Aquaculture Authority (Amendment) Act, 2023
2023	36	The Central Universities (Amendment) Act, 2023

== Amendments ==
No.	Year	Act No.	Short title	Amendment
1	1897	10	The General Clauses Act, 1897	In section 27, for the words “registered post”, the words “speed post with registration” shall be substituted.
2	1908	5	The Code of Civil Procedure, 1908	(i) In section 148A, in sub-section (2), for the words “registered post, acknowledgement due”, the words “speed post with registration and proof of delivery” shall be substituted; (ii) In the First Schedule,–– (a) in Order V, in rule 9,–– (I) in sub-rule (3), for the words “registered post acknowledgement due, addressed to the defendant or his agent empowered to accept the service or by speed post”, the words “speed post with registration and proof of delivery addressed to the defendant or his agent empowered to accept the service” shall be substituted; (II) in sub-rule (4), the brackets and words “(except by registered post acknowledgment due)” shall be omitted; (III) in sub-rule (5), in the proviso, for the words “registered post acknowledgement due, the declaration referred to in this sub-rule shall be made notwithstanding the fact that the acknowledgement”, the words “speed post with registration and proof of delivery, the declaration referred to in this sub-rule shall be made notwithstanding the fact that the proof of delivery” shall be substituted; (b) in Order XXI, in rule 1, in sub-rule (2), for the words “registered post, acknowledgement due”, the words “speed post with registration and proof of delivery” shall be substituted; and (c) in Order XXXIX, in rule 3, in the proviso, in clause (a), for the words “registered post”, the words “speed post with registration” shall be substituted.
3	1925	39	The Indian Succession Act, 1925	(i) In section 3, in sub-section (1), the figures “, 213” shall be omitted; (ii) section 213 shall be omitted; (iii) in section 370,–– (a) in sub-section (1), for the words and figures “or section 213 to be established by letters of administration or probate”, the words “to be established by letters of administration” shall be substituted; (b) in sub-section (2), clause (b) shall be omitted.
4	2005	53	The Disaster Management Act, 2005	In section 30, in sub-section (2), in clause (vi), for the word “prevention”, the word “preparation” shall be substituted.
