= Government of National Capital Territory of Delhi Ordinance, 2023 =

Ordinance by the Government of India in 2023

Government of National Capital Territory of Delhi (Amendment) Ordinance, 2023

Government of India
- Long title: An Ordinance further to amend the Government of National Capital Territory of Delhi Act, 1991.
- Citation: No. 1 of 2023
- Passed by: Union Cabinet
- Passed: May 2023
- Signed by: President Droupadi Murmu
- Signed: 19 May 2023
- Effective: 19 May 2023
- Repealed: 11 August 2023

Amends
- Government of National Capital Territory of Delhi Act, 1991

Repealed by
- Government of National Capital Territory of Delhi (Amendment) Act, 2023
- Status: Repealed

The Government of National Capital Territory of Delhi (Amendment) Ordinance, 2023 was an Ordinance to create a National Capital Civil Service Authority which has power related to Transfer and Posting of officers under Delhi Government. India is a federal country where each state is headed by a Chief Minister and his council of Ministers. Delhi being a Union Territory also has a legislature. This was aimed to make transfer and posting more stable and to make both Central and state government of Delhi be involved in transfer-posting of officers.

== Background ==
Supreme Court in May 2023 gave all the powers on transfer and posting of officers to Delhi's elected CM. After this Central Government declared that it is willing to pass an ordinance which is called Government of National Capital Territory of Delhi (Amendment) Ordinance, 2023.

The ordinance was aimed at creating a National Capital Civil Service Authority.

A bill to replace this ordinance got passed by Union Council of Minister on 26 July.

== National Capital Civil Service Authority ==
It is an administrative authority that will manage the Civil Services in Delhi. The authority will have 3 members- Chief Minister of Delhi, the Chief Secretary and the Principal Home Secretary. The meetings of this authority will be chaired by Chief Minister of Delhi. The decisions are taken by vote.

NCCSA gives the union government more power to take decisions regarding the tenure, salaries, allowances, powers, and duties of officers.

=== Role of CM in NCCSA ===
CM will chair the meetings of NCCSA and decide the meeting's day and date. He will be presiding over discussions in NCCSA.

=== Role of LG in NCCSA ===
LG will have final decision making authority. He can return files to NCCSA for reconsideration or can also take independent decisions for transfer and posting.

== Opposition ==
Aam Aadmi Party opposed the bill and called it undemocratic. Arvind Kejriwal urged other parties to oppose this bill in Rajya Sabha. He met various CMs of Non- BJP ruled states to get support against this bill. Delhi Government moved to Supreme Court against this ordinance. The newly elected government of the BJP has taken back all the cases in the supreme court challenging the act.
