= Inland Vessels Act, 1917 =

Inland Vessels (Amendment) Act, 2007

Parliament of India
- Long title: An Act further to amend the Inland Vessels Act, 1917.
- Citation: No. 35 of 2007
- Passed by: Rajya Sabha
- Passed: 22 August 2007
- Considered by: Lok Sabha
- Passed: 30 August 2007
- Assented to: 17 September 2007
- Commenced: 21 February 2008

Legislative history

Initiating chamber: Rajya Sabha
- Bill title: Inland Vessels (Amendment) Bill, 2005
- Bill citation: Bill No. CXXVI of 2005
- Introduced by: T. R. Baalu, Minister of Shipping, Road Transport & Highways
- Introduced: 8 December 2005
- Standing Committee on Transport, Tourism and Culture: 13 December 2005–21 March 2006
- Passed: 22 August 2007

Revising chamber: Lok Sabha
- Passed: 30 August 2007

Amends
- Inland Vessels Act, 1917 (1 of 1917)

Repealed by
- Repealing and Amending (Second) Act, 2015 (19 of 2015)
- Status: Repealed

The Inland Vessels (Amendment) Act, 2007 is an Act of the Parliament of India enacted to facilitate the extension and usage of inland waterways by vessels. It is an amendment to the original Inland Vessels Act, 1917. The Act came into force on 21 February 2008.

Inland water traffic amounts to only 0.17% of total inland traffic in India. The act addresses the extension of inland water limits, facilitating safety of vessels by dividing the inland water area into three zones based on maximum significant wave height criteria, employment of manpower from Army, Navy and Coast Guard in this sector, controlling pollution and regulating the insurance regime on par with motor vehicles.
