= Government of National Capital Territory of Delhi (Amendment) Act, 2021 =

Act of the Parliament of India

Parliament of India
- Long title: An Act further to amend the Government of National Capital Territory of Delhi Act, 1991.
- Citation: No. 15 of 2021
- Passed by: Lok Sabha
- Passed: 22 March 2021
- Passed by: Rajya Sabha
- Passed: 24 March 2021
- Assented to by: President Ram Nath Kovind
- Assented to: 28 March 2021
- Commenced: 27 April 2021
- Repealed: 20 December 2025

Legislative history

Initiating chamber: Lok Sabha
- Bill title: Government of National Capital Territory of Delhi (Amendment) Bill, 2021
- Bill citation: Bill No. 55 of 2021
- Introduced by: Home Minister Amit Shah
- Introduced: 15 March 2021
- Passed: 22 March 2021

Revising chamber: Rajya Sabha
- Passed: 24 March 2021

Amends
- Government of National Capital Territory of Delhi Act, 1991 (1 of 1992)

Repealed by
- Repealing and Amending Act, 2025 (35 of 2025)
- Status: Repealed

The Government of National Capital Territory of Delhi (Amendment) Act, 2021 (or the GNCTD Amendment Act) was enacted by the Government of India on 28 March 2021. It amends the Government of National Capital Territory of Delhi Act, 1991 to give primacy to the centrally appointed Lieutenant Governor of Delhi and make the elected Government of Delhi subsidiary. The elected government will now have to seek the opinion of the Lieutenant Governor for any executive action.

== Description ==
The GNCTD Act, 1991 provides a framework for the functioning of the Legislative Assembly and the government of the National Capital Territory (NCT) of Delhi. The Act amends certain powers and responsibilities of the Legislative Assembly and the Lieutenant Governor.

The 2021 Amendment provides that the term "government" referred to in any law made by the Legislative Assembly will imply Lieutenant Governor (LG). The Amendment allows the Legislative Assembly to make Rules to regulate the procedure and conduct of business in the Assembly. The Amendment provides that such Rules must be consistent with the Rules of Procedure and Conduct of Business in the Lok Sabha. It prohibits the Legislative Assembly from making any rule to enable itself or its Committees to: (i) consider the matters of day-to-day administration of the NCT of Delhi and (ii) conduct any inquiry in relation to administrative decisions. Further, the Amendment provides that all such rules made before its enactment will be void. The Amendment requires the LG to reserve certain Bills passed by the Legislative Assembly for the consideration of the President. These Bills are those: (i) which may diminish the powers of the High Court of Delhi, (ii) which the President may direct to be reserved, (iii) dealing with the salaries and allowances of the Speaker, Deputy Speaker, and members of the Assembly and the Ministers, or (iv) relating to official languages of the Assembly or the NCT of Delhi. The Amendment requires the LG to also reserve those Bills for the President which incidentally cover any of the matters outside the purview of the powers of the Legislative Assembly.This also specifies that all executive action by the government, whether taken on the advice of the Ministers or otherwise, must be taken in the name of the LG. The Amendment adds that on certain matters, as specified by the LG, his opinion must be obtained before taking any executive action on the decisions of the Minister/ Council of Ministers.

== Criticism ==
The Amendment was widely criticized by the Delhi's ruling Aam Aadmi Party for "demolishing the federal structure" of the government by transferring the power of an elected government to the Lieutenant Governor.

== See also ==
- Government of National Capital Territory of Delhi (Amendment) Act, 2023
