= Caste Disabilities Removal Act, 1850 =

Governor-General of India in Council
- Long title: An Act for extending the principle of section 9, Regulation VII, 1832, of the Bengal Code throughout the Territories subject to the Government of the East India Company.
- Citation: Act XXI of 1850
- Enacted: 11 April 1850
- Commenced: 11 April 1850
- Repealed: 8 January 2018

Repeals
- Repealing and Amending (Second) Act, 2017
- Status: Repealed

The Caste Disabilities Removal Act, 1850 (Act XXI of 1850), was a law passed in British India under East India Company rule, that abolished all laws affecting the rights of people converting to another religion or caste. The new act allowed Hindus who converted from Hindu religion to another religion equal rights under the new law, especially in the case of inheritance.

== Text ==
Preamble

Whereas it is enacted by section 9, Regulation VII, 1832, of the Bengal Code, that "whenever in any civil suit the parties to such suit may be of different persuasions, when one party shall be of the Hindu and the other of the Muhammadan persuasion, or where one or more of the parties to the suit shall not be either of the Muhammadan or Hindu persuasions, the laws of those religions shall not be permitted to operate to deprive such party or parties of any property to which, but for the operation of such laws, they would have been entitled; and whereas it will be beneficial to extend the principle of that enactment throughout the territories subject to the government of the East India Company. It is enacted as follows: —

1. So much of any law or usage now in force within the territories subject to the government of the East India Company as inflicts on any person forfeiture of rights or property, or may be held in any way to impair or affect any right of inheritance, by reason of his or her renouncing, or having been excluded from the communion of, any religion, or being deprived of caste, shall cease to be enforced as law in the Courts of the East India Company, and in the Courts established by Royal Charter within the said territories.
