= Repealing and Amending Act, 2019 =

Act of the Parliament of India

Parliament of India
- Long title: An Act to repeal certain enactments and to amend certain other enactments.
- Citation: Act No. 31 of 2019
- Territorial extent: India
- Passed by: Lok Sabha
- Passed: 29 July 2019
- Passed by: Rajya Sabha
- Passed: 2 August 2019
- Assented to by: President Ram Nath Kovind
- Assented to: 8 August 2019
- Commenced: 8 August 2019

Legislative history

Initiating chamber: Lok Sabha
- Bill title: The Repealing and Amending Bill, 2019
- Bill citation: Bill No. 188 of 2019
- Introduced by: Minister of Law and Justice Ravi Shankar Prasad
- Introduced: 25 July 2019

Repeals
- 58 Acts

Related legislation
- Repealing and Amending Act, 2015; Repealing and Amending (Second) Act, 2015; Repealing and Amending Act, 2016; Repealing and Amending Act, 2017; Repealing and Amending (Second) Act, 2017; Repealing and Amending Act, 2023
- Status: In force

The Repealing and Amending Act, 2019 is an Act of the Parliament of India that repealed 58 Acts. It also made minor amendments to the Income-tax Act, 1961 and the Indian Institutes of Management Act, 2017. The act was the sixth Act aimed at repealing obsolete laws tabled by the Narendra Modi administration, and the first tabled during its second term. The government had repealed 1,428 acts during its first term between 2014 and 2019.

== Background and legislative history ==
Prime Minister Narendra Modi had advocated for the repeal of old laws during his 2014 general election campaign. At the 2015 Economic Times Global Business Summit, Modi stated, "Our country suffers from an excess of old and unnecessary laws which obstruct people and businesses. We began the exercise of identifying unnecessary laws and repealing them. 1,877 Central laws have been identified for repeal."

The Repealing and Amending Bill, 2019 was introduced in the Lok Sabha on 25 July 2019 by the Minister of Law and Justice, Ravi Shankar Prasad. The bill sought to repeal 58 Acts and pass minor amendments to two Acts. The amendments were made to substitute certain words in the Income Tax Act, 1961 and The Indian Institutes of Management Act, 2017. Moving the bill for a vote in the House on 29 July, Prasad stated that the Modi administration had repealed 1,428 "old and archaic Acts" during its first term. The Minister also noted that most of the laws being repealed were enacted before independence and that only 1,929 old laws had been repealed between 1950 and 2004. Prasad also urged the House to pass the bill unanimously.

Speaker Om Birla asked the House whether the bill could be passed unanimously. Congress MP for Thiruvananthapuram, Shashi Tharoor requested the Speaker push the vote on the bill to the next day and instead permit an hour-long discussion. In response, the Speaker permitted Tharoor to speak for ten minutes and stated that the vote would be held afterwards. Tharoor sought changes to some provisions of the Indian Penal Code including those concerning sedition. Prasad replied that he disagreed with Tharoor's demand to repeal the sedition law. In the subsequent vote, the bill was passed unanimously by the Lok Sabha.

Prasad moved the bill in the Rajya Sabha on 2 August. He stated, "I would urge the House that this is the initiative in the right direction. I would urge this House and through this House the entire country and state governments that periodic review of obsolete and irrelevant laws must become a part of good governance." Bharat Rashtra Samithi MP K. Keshava Rao expressed concern over the repeal of The Andhra Pradesh Reorganisation (Amendment) Act, 2014 and The Andhra Pradesh Reorganisation (Amendment) Act, 2015. Prasad responded that the state's interest were protected as the provisions of the amendments had been incorporated into the main Act.

The Minister also responded to a suggestion to repeal The Cinematograph Act, 1952 stating that he agreed with the idea having previously served as Minister of Information and Broadcasting. However, he noted that "the film community should have one voice on this". Other members who participated in the discussion included Jaya Bachchan (SP), Prashant Nanda (BJD), Subhashish Chakraborty (AITC), Amee Yajnik (Congress), A. Navaneethakrishnana (AIADMK), Kahkashan Perween (JD-U), K. Somaprasad (CPI-M), Binay Visham (CPI), Bhupendra Yadav (BJP), Veer Singh (BJP) and Ram Kumar Verma (BJP). The bill received support from members across party lines and was passed by the Rajya Sabha through voice vote.

The bill received assent from President Ram Nath Kovind on 8 August, and was notified in The Gazette of India on the same date.

== Repealed acts ==
The 58 acts included in the act's First Schedule were completely repealed.

No.	Year	Act No.	Short title
1	1850	XII	The Public Accountants' Defaults Act, 1850
2	1881	XI	The Municipal Taxation Act, 1881
3	1892	X	The Government Management of Private Estates Act, 1892
4	1956	69	The Terminal Tax on Railway Passengers Act, 1956
5	1958	56	The Himachal Pradesh Legislative Assembly (Constitution and Proceedings) Validation Act, 1958
6	1960	22	The Cotton Transport (Amendment) Act, 1960
7	1963	1	The Hindi Sahitya Sammelan (Amendment) Act, 1963
8	1963	35	The Dramatic Performances (Delhi Repeal) Act, 1963
9	1964	10	The Public Employment (Requirement as to Residence) Amendment Act, 1964
10	1968	49	The Delhi and Ajmer Rent Control (Nasirabad Cantonment Repeal) Act, 1968
11	1973	56	The Alcock Ashdown Company Limited (Acquisition of Undertakings) Act, 1973
12	1976	55	The Iron Ore Mines, Manganese Ore Mines and Chrome Ore Mines Labour Welfare Cess Act, 1976
13	1976	61	The Iron Ore Mines, Manganese Ore Mines and Chrome Ore Mines Labour Welfare Cess Act, 1976
14	1976	62	The Beedi Workers Welfare Fund Act, 1976
15	1980	68	The Tea (Amendment) Act, 1980
16	1981	62	The Aligarh Muslim University (Amendment) Act, 1981
17	1982	63	The Road Transport Corporations (Amendment) Act, 1982
18	1983	41	The Transformers and Switchgear Limited (Acquisition and Transfer Undertakings) Act, 1983
19	1988	22	The Tamil Nadu Agricultural Service Co-operative Societies(Appointment of Special Officers) Amendment Act, 1988
20	1999	3	The High Denomination Bank Notes(Demonetisation) Amendment Act, 1998
21	2001	39	The Motor Vehicles (Amendment) Act, 2001
22	2001	48	The Registration and Other Related Laws(Amendment) Act, 2001
23	2002	16	The Institutes of Technology(Amendment) Act, 2002
24	2002	43	The Delhi University (Amendment) Act, 2002
25	2007	3	The Dalmia Dadri Cement Limited (Acquisition and Transfer of Undertakings) Amendment Act, 2006
26	2007	28	The Central Road Fund (Amendment) Act, 2007
27	2009	21	The Prevention of Money Laundering (Amendment) Act, 2009
28	2009	22	The Central Industrial Security Force (Amendment) Act, 2009
29	2009	38	The Central Universities (Amendment) Act, 2009
30	2010	3	The Civil Defence (Amendment) Act, 2009
31	2011	6	The Repatriation of Prisoners (Amendment) Act, 2011
32	2011	14	The Customs (Amendment and Validation) Act, 2011
33	2012	28	The National Institutes of Technology (Amendment) Act, 2012
34	2012	34	The Institutes of Technology (Amendment) Act, 2012
35	2014	8	The Governors (Emoluments, Allowances and Privileges) Amendment Act, 2014
36	2014	9	The National Institute of Technology, Science Education and Research (Amendment) Act, 2014
37	2014	19	The Andhra Pradesh Reorganisation (Amendment) Act, 2014
38	2014	20	The Telecom Regulatory Authority of India (Amendment) Act, 2014
39	2014	31	The Merchant Shipping (Amendment) Act, 2014
40	2014	32	The Merchant Shipping (Second Amendment) Act, 2014
41	2014	39	The National Capital Territory of Delhi Laws (Special Provisions) Second (Amendment) Act, 2014
42	2015	2	The Public Premises (Eviction of Unauthorised Occupants) Amendment Act, 2015
43	2015	3	The Motor Vehicles (Amendment) Act, 2015
44	2015	5	The Insurance Laws (Amendment) Act, 2015
45	2015	10	The Mines and Minerals (Development and Regulation) Amendment Act, 2015
46	2015	12	The Andhra Pradesh Reorganisation (Amendment) Act, 2015
47	2015	14	The Regional Rural Banks (Amendment) Act, 2015
48	2015	16	The Warehousing Corporations (Amendment) Act, 2015
49	2015	21	The Companies (Amendment) Act, 2015
50	2016	10	The Election Laws (Amendment) Act, 2016
51	2016	13	The High Court and the Supreme Court Judges (Salaries and Conditions of Service) Amendment Act, 2016
52	2016	25	The Mines and Minerals (Development and Regulation) Amendment Act, 2016
53	2016	42	The National Institute of Technology, Science Education and Research (Amendment) Act, 2016
54	2016	45	The Central Agricultural University (Amendment) Act, 2016
55	2016	48	The Taxation Laws (Second Amendment) Act, 2016
56	2017	19	The National Institute of Technology, Science Education and Research (Amendment) Act, 2017
57	2017	21	The Collection of Statistics (Amendment) Act, 2017
58	2017	25	The Indian Institutes of Information Technology (Amendment) Act, 2017
