= Repealing and Amending Act, 2017 =

Act of the Parliament of India

Parliament of India
- Long title: An Act to repeal certain enactments and to amend certain other enactments.
- Citation: Act No. 2 of 2018
- Territorial extent: India
- Passed by: Lok Sabha
- Passed: 19 December 2017
- Passed by: Rajya Sabha
- Passed: 28 December 2017
- Assented to by: President Ram Nath Kovind
- Assented to: 5 January 2018
- Commenced: 8 January 2018

Legislative history

Initiating chamber: Lok Sabha
- Bill title: The Repealing and Amending Bill, 2017
- Bill citation: Bill No. 22 of 2017
- Introduced by: Minister of Law and Justice Ravi Shankar Prasad
- Introduced: 9 February 2017

Related legislation
- Repealing and Amending Act, 2015; Repealing and Amending (Second) Act, 2015; Repealing and Amending Act, 2016; Repealing and Amending (Second) Act, 2017; Repealing and Amending Act, 2019; Repealing and Amending Act, 2023
- Status: Spent

The Repealing and Amending Act, 2017 is an Act of the Parliament of India that repealed 104 Acts, partially repealed three sections of the Taxation Laws (Amendment) Act, 2007, and made minor amendments to three other Acts to correct typographical errors. The Act was the fourth such repealing act tabled by the Narendra Modi administration aimed at repealing obsolete laws.

== Background and legislative history ==
Prime Minister Narendra Modi had advocated the repeal of old laws during his 2014 general election campaign. At the 2015 Economic Times Global Business Summit, Modi stated, "Our country suffers from an excess of old and unnecessary laws which obstruct people and businesses. We began the exercise of identifying unnecessary laws and repealing them. 1,877 Central laws have been identified for repeal."

The Repealing and Amending Bill, 2017 was introduced in the Lok Sabha on 9 February 2017 by the Minister of Law and Justice, Ravi Shankar Prasad. The bill sought to repeal 104 Acts, including over 20 Acts enacted before independence. It also sought to repeal three sections of the Taxation Laws (Amendment) Act, 2007, and make minor amendments to three other Acts to correct typographical errors.

The bill was passed by the Lok Sabha on 19 December 2017 and by the Rajya Sabha on 28 December 2017. The bill received assent from President Ram Nath Kovind on 5 January 2018, and was notified in The Gazette of India on 8 January 2018.

== Repealed Acts ==
The 104 Acts included in the bill's First Schedule were completely repealed.

No.	Year	Act No.	Short title	Extent of repeal
1	1850	XXXVII	The Public Servants (Inquiries) Act, 1850	The whole
2	1852	VIII	The Sheriffs' Fees Act, 1852	The whole
3	1866	XXI	The Converts' Marriage Dissolution Act, 1866	The whole
4	1867	I	The Ganges Tolls Act, 1867	The whole
5	1892	II	The Marriages' Validation Act, 1892	The whole
6	1897	I	The Public Servants (Inquiries) Amendment Act, 1897	The whole
7	1897	V	The Repealing and Amending Act, 1897	The whole
8	1897	XIV	The Indian Short Titles Act, 1897	The whole
9	1899	XXIII	The Church of Scotland Kirk Sessions Act, 1899	The whole
10	1901	XI	The Amending Act, 1901	The whole
11	1903	I	The Amending Act, 1903	The whole
12	1928	XII	The Hindu Inheritance (Removal of Disabilities) Act, 1928	The whole
13	1929	XXI	The Transfer of Property (Amendment) Supplementary Act, 1929	So much as is not repealed
14	1934	XXVII	The Assam Criminal Law Amendment (Supplementary) Act, 1934	The whole
15	1935	XIII	The Jubbulpore and Chhattisgarh Divisions (Divorce Proceedings Validation) Act, 1935	The whole
16	1936	V	The Decrees and Orders Validating Act, 1936	The whole
17	1936	XVI	The Bangalore Marriages Validating Act, 1936	The whole
18	1938	XI	The Hindu Women's Right to Property (Amendment) Act, 1938	The whole
19	1939	XXIX	The Indian Tariff (Fourth Amendment) Act, 1939	The whole
20	1946	XXII	The Mica Mines Labour Welfare Fund Act, 1946	The whole
21	1948	XL	The Indian Matrimonial Causes (War Marriages) Act, 1948	The whole
22	1948	LI	The Imperial Library (Change of Name) Act, 1948	The whole
23	1950	XXXIII	The Opium and Revenue Laws (Extension of Application) Act, 1950	The whole
24	1951	I	The Code of Criminal Procedure (Amendment) Act, 1951	So much as is not repealed
25	1951	II	The Code of Civil Procedure (Amendment) Act, 1951	So much as is not repealed
26	1953	11	The Administration of Evacuee Property (Amendment) Act, 1953	The whole
27	1954	3	The Ancient and Historical Monuments and Archaeological Sites and Remains (Declaration of National Importance) Amendment Act, 1953	The whole
28	1954	42	The Administration of Evacuee Property (Amendment) Act, 1954	The whole
29	1955	26	The Code of Criminal Procedure (Amendment) Act, 1955	So much as is not repealed
30	1956	7	The Sales-Tax Laws Validation Act, 1956	The whole
31	1956	27	The Representation of the People (Second Amendment) Act, 1956	The whole
32	1956	66	The Code of Civil Procedure (Amendment) Act, 1956	So much as is not repealed
33	1956	70	The Ancient and Historical Monuments and Archaeological Sites and Remains The whole. (Declaration of National Importance) Amendment Act, 1956	The whole
34	1956	91	The Administration of Evacuee Property (Amendment) Act, 1956	The whole
35	1956	93	The Young Persons (Harmful Publications) Act, 1956	The whole
36	1956	100	The Motor Vehicles (Amendment) Act, 1956	The whole
37	1959	37	The Central Excises and Salt (Amendment) Act, 1959	So much as is not repealed
38	1959	41	The Criminal Law (Amendment) Act, 1959	So much as is not repealed
39	1959	48	The Miscellaneous Personal Laws (Extension) Act, 1959	The whole
40	1959	59	The Mineral Oils (Additional Duties of Excise and Customs) Amendment Act, 1959	So much as is not repealed
41	1959	61	The Married Women's Property (Extension) Act, 1959	The whole
42	1960	2	The Displaced Persons (Compensation and Rehabilitation) Amendment Act, 1960	So much as is not repealed
43	1960	5	The Motor Vehicles (Amendment) Act, 1960	So much as is not repealed
44	1960	19	The Hindu Marriages (Validation of Proceedings) Act, 1960	The whole
45	1960	38	The Central Excises (Conversion to Metric Units) Act, 1960	So much as is not repealed
46	1960	40	The Customs Duties and Cesses (Conversion to Metric Units) Act, 1960	So much as is not repealed
47	1960	57	The British Statutes (Application to India) Repeal Act, 1960	The whole
48	1966	47	The Representation of the People (Amendment) Act, 1966	So much as is not repealed
49	1969	46	The Punjab Legislative Council (Abolition) Act, 1969	The whole
50	1971	20	The Bengal Finance (Sales Tax) (Delhi Validation of Appointments and Proceedings) Act, 1971	The whole
51	1971	54	The Coal Bearing Areas (Acquisition and Development) Amendment and Validation Act, 1971	The whole
52	1972	62	The Limestone and Dolomite Mines Labour Welfare Fund Act, 1972	The whole
53	1976	91	The Delhi Sales Tax (Amendment and Validation) Act, 1976	The whole
54	1980	63	The Code of Criminal Procedure (Amendment) Act, 1980	So much as is not repealed
55	1981	30	The Cine-workers Welfare Cess Act, 1981	The whole
56	1983	20	The Delegated Legislation Provisions (Amendment) Act, 1983	The whole
57	1984	19	The Government of Union Territories (Amendment) Act, 1984	So much as is not repealed
58	1985	37	The Tea Companies (Acquisition and Transfer of Sick Tea Units) Act, 1985	The whole
59	1985	81	The Banking Laws (Amendment) Act, 1985	So much as is not repealed
60	1986	6	The Additional Duties of Excise (Textiles and Textile Articles) Amendment Act, 1985	The whole
61	1986	7	The Additional Duties of Excise (Goods of Special Importance) Second Amendment Act, 1985	The whole
62	1986	8	The Customs Tariff (Amendment) Act, 1985	The whole
63	1986	19	The Administrative Tribunals (Amendment) Act, 1986	So much as is not repealed
64	1986	46	The Taxation Laws (Amendment and Miscellaneous Provisions) Act, 1986	The whole
65	1999	29	The Contingency Fund of India (Amendment) Act, 1999	The whole
66	1999	31	The Securities Laws (Amendment) Act, 1999	The whole
67	1999	32	The Securities Laws (Second Amendment) Act, 1999	The whole
68	1999	45	The Vice-President's Pension (Amendment) Act, 1999	The whole
69	2000	14	The President's Emoluments and Pension (Amendment) Act, 2000	The whole
70	2000	49	The Protection of Human Rights (Amendment) Act, 2000	The whole
71	2001	12	The Colonial Prisoners Removal (Repeal) Act, 2001	The whole
72	2001	19	The Industrial Disputes (Banking Companies) Decision (Repeal) Act, 2001	The whole
73	2001	22	The Judicial Administration Laws (Repeal) Act, 2001	The whole
74	2001	24	The Indian Railway Companies (Repeal) Act, 2001	The whole
75	2001	25	The Railway Companies (Substitution of Parties in Civil Proceedings) Repeal Act, 2001	The whole
76	2001	26	The Hyderabad Export Duties (Validation) Repeal Act, 2001	The whole
77	2001	50	The Code of Criminal Procedure (Amendment) Act, 2001	The whole
78	2002	21	The St. John Ambulance Association (India) Transfer of Funds (Repeal) Act, 2002	The whole
79	2002	22	The Code of Civil Procedure (Amendment) Act, 2002	The whole
80	2002	23	The Vice-President's Pension (Amendment) Act, 2002	The whole
81	2002	28	The National Institute of Pharmaceutical Education and Research (Amendment) Act, 2002	The whole
82	2002	59	The Securities and Exchange Board of India (Amendment) Act, 2002	The whole
83	2002	68	The North-Eastern Council (Amendment) Act, 2002	The whole
84	2003	25	The Customs Tariff (Amendment) Act, 2003	The whole
85	2003	31	The Prevention of Insults to National Honour (Amendment) Act, 2003	The whole
86	2004	7	The Uttar Pradesh Reorganisation (Amendment) Act, 2003	The whole
87	2004	28	The Special Tribunals (Supplementary Provisions) Repeal Act, 2004	The whole
88	2004	29	The Unlawful Activities (Prevention) Amendment Act, 2004	The whole
89	2005	1	The Securities Laws (Amendment) Act, 2004	The whole
90	2005	5	The Central Excise Tariff (Amendment) Act, 2004	The whole
91	2005	31	The Hire-purchase (Repeal) Act, 2005	The whole
92	2005	51	The Prevention of Insults to National Honour (Amendment) Act, 2005	The whole
93	2006	10	The Khadi and Village Industries Commission (Amendment) Act, 2006	The whole
94	2006	20	The Delhi Special Police Establishment (Amendment) Act, 2006	The whole
95	2006	30	The Union Duties of Excise (Electricity) Distribution Repeal Act, 2006	The whole
96	2006	43	The Protection of Human Rights (Amendment) Act, 2006	The whole
97	2006	51	The Jallianwala Bagh National Memorial (Amendment) Act, 2006	The whole
98	2007	1	The Administrative Tribunals (Amendment) Act, 2007	The whole
99	2007	16	The Taxation Laws (Amendment) Act, 2007	Sections 9 to 11
100	2007	19	The National Institute of Pharmaceutical Education and Research (Amendment) Act, 2007	The whole
101	2007	27	The Securities Contracts (Regulation) Amendment Act, 2007	The whole
102	2008	28	The President's Emoluments and Pension (Amendment) Act, 2008	The whole
103	2008	29	The Vice-President's Pension (Amendment) Act, 2008	The whole
104	2008	35	The Unlawful Activities (Prevention) Amendment Act, 2008	The whole
105	2009	1	The Governors (Emoluments, Allowances and Privileges) Amendment Act, 2008	The whole
