= Repealing and Amending Act, 2023 =

Act of the Parliament of India

Parliament of India
- Long title: An Act to repeal certain enactments and to amend an enactment
- Citation: Act No. 37 of 2023
- Territorial extent: India
- Passed by: Lok Sabha
- Passed: 27 July 2023
- Passed by: Rajya Sabha
- Passed: 13 December 2023
- Assented to by: President Droupadi Murmu
- Assented to: 17 December 2023

Legislative history

Initiating chamber: Lok Sabha
- Bill title: The Repealing and Amending Bill, 2022
- Bill citation: Bill No. 290 of 2022
- Introduced by: Minister of Law and Justice Kiren Rijiju
- Introduced: 19 December 2022

Repeals
- 76 Acts

Related legislation
- Repealing and Amending Act, 2015; Repealing and Amending (Second) Act, 2015; Repealing and Amending Act, 2016; Repealing and Amending Act, 2017; Repealing and Amending (Second) Act, 2017; Repealing and Amending Act, 2019
- Status: Spent

The Repealing and Amending Act, 2023 is an Act of the Parliament of India that repealed 76 Acts. It also made minor amendment to the Factoring Regulation Act, 2011. The Act was the seventh such repealing act aimed at repealing obsolete laws tabled by the Government of India.

== Background and legislative history ==
The Repealing and Amending Bill, 2022 was introduced in the Lok Sabha on 19 December 2022 by the Minister of Law and Justice, Kiren Rijiju. The bill sought to repeal 65 Acts. It also sought to make minor amendment to Factoring Regulation Act, 2011.

The bill was passed by the Lok Sabha on 27 July 2023 with some changes and by the Rajya Sabha on 13 December 2023. The bill received assent from President Droupadi Murmu on 17 December 2023, and was notified in The Gazette of India on 18 December 2023.

== Repealed Acts ==
No.	Year	Act No.	Short title
1	1850	18	The Judicial Officers Protection Act, 1850
2	1855	28	The Usury Laws Repeal Act, 1855
3	1857	5	The Oriental Gas Company Act, 1857
4	1867	11	The Oriental Gas Company Act, 1867
5	1871	4	The Coroners Act, 1871
6	1881	16	The Obstruction in Fairways Act, 1881
7	1885	18	The Land Acquisition (Mines) Act, 1885
8	1912	13	The Delhi Laws Act, 1912
9	1915	7	The Delhi Laws Act, 1915
10	1922	22	The Police (Incitement to Disaffection) Act, 1922
11	1923	6	The Cantonments (House Accommodation) Act, 1923
12	1934	15	The Sugar-cane Act, 1934
13	1941	12	The Delhi Restriction of Uses of Land Act, 1941
14	1950	74	The Telegraph Wires (Unlawful Possession) Act, 1950
15	1965	44	The Metal Corporation of India (Acquisition of Undertaking) Act, 1965
16	1974	28	The Coal Mines (Conservation and Development) Act, 1974
17	1976	100	The Metal Corporation (Nationalisation and Miscellaneous Provisions) Act, 1976
18	1982	71	The Andhra Scientific Company Limited (Acquisition and Transfer of Undertakings) Act, 1982
19	1983	17	The Delhi Motor Vehicles Taxation (Amendment) Act, 1983
20	1994	13	The Air Corporations (Transfer of Undertakings and Repeal) Act, 1994
21	2018	1	The Companies (Amendment) Act, 2017
22	2018	8	The Insolvency and Bankruptcy Code (Amendment) Act, 2018
23	2018	21	The Requisitioning and Acquisition of Immovable Property (Amendment) Act, 2018
24	2018	23	The Homoeopathy Central Council (Amendment) Act, 2018
25	2018	26	The Insolvency and Bankruptcy Code (Second Amendment) Act, 2018
26	2018	27	The Scheduled Castes and the Scheduled Tribes (Prevention of Atrocities) Amendment Act, 2018
27	2019	6	The Personal Laws (Amendment) Act, 2019
28	2019	8	The Special Economic Zones (Amendment) Act, 2019
29	2019	11	The Homoeopathy Central Council (Amendment) Act, 2019
30	2019	14	The Aadhaar and Other Laws (Amendment) Act, 2019
31	2019	24	The Right to Information (Amendment) Act, 2019
32	2019	26	The Insolvency and Bankruptcy Code (Amendment) Act, 2019
33	2019	36	The Public Premises (Eviction of Unauthorised Occupants) Amendment Act, 2019
34	2019	37	The Supreme Court (Number of Judges) Amendment Act, 2019
35	2020	19	The Salary, Allowances and Pension of Members of Parliament (Amendment) Act, 2020
36	2013	5	The Appropriation (Railways) Vote on Account Act, 2013
37	2013	6	The Appropriation (Railways) Act, 2013
38	2013	7	The Appropriation (Railways) No. 2 Act, 2013
39	2013	8	The Appropriation (Vote on Account) Act, 2013
40	2013	9	The Appropriation Act, 2013
41	2013	10	The Appropriation (No. 2) Act, 2013
42	2013	15	The Appropriation (Railways) No. 3 Act, 2013
43	2013	16	The Appropriation (No. 3) Act, 2013
44	2013	21	The Appropriation (No. 4) Act, 2013
45	2014	2	The Appropriation (No. 5) Act, 2013
46	2014	3	The Appropriation (Railways) No. 4 Act, 2013
47	2014	4	The Appropriation (Railways) Vote on Account Act, 2014
48	2014	5	The Appropriation (Railways) Act, 2014
49	2014	12	The Appropriation (Vote on Account) Act, 2014
50	2014	13	The Appropriation Act, 2014
51	2014	21	The Appropriation (Railways) No. 2 Act, 2014
52	2014	22	The Appropriation (Railways) No. 3 Act, 2014
53	2014	23	The Appropriation (No. 2) Act, 2014
54	2014	24	The Appropriation (No. 3) Act, 2014
55	2014	38	The Appropriation (No. 4) Act, 2014
56	2015	6	The Appropriation (Railways) Vote on Account Act, 2015
57	2015	7	The Appropriation (Railways) Act, 2015
58	2015	8	The Appropriation (Vote on Account) Act, 2015
59	2015	9	The Appropriation Act, 2015
60	2015	13	The Appropriation (Railways) No. 2 Act, 2015
61	2015	15	The Appropriation (No. 2) Act, 2015
62	2015	24	The Appropriation (Railways) No. 3 Act, 2015
63	2015	25	The Appropriation (No. 3) Act, 2015
64	2016	7	The Appropriation (No. 4) Act, 2015
65	2016	8	The Appropriation (No. 5) Act, 2015
66	2016	14	The Appropriation (Railways) Vote on Account Act, 2016
67	2016	15	The Appropriation (Railways) Act, 2016
68	2016	19	The Appropriation (Vote on Account) Act, 2016
69	2016	20	The Appropriation Act, 2016
70	2016	26	The Appropriation (Railways) No. 2 Act, 2016
71	2016	29	The Appropriation (No. 2) Act, 2016
72	2016	46	The Appropriation (No. 3) Act, 2016
73	2016	50	The Appropriation (No. 4) Act, 2016
74	2016	51	The Appropriation (No. 5) Act, 2016
75	2017	8	The Appropriation (Railways) Act, 2017
76	2017	9	The Appropriation (Railways) No. 2 Act, 2017

== Amendment ==
No.	Year	Act No.	Short title	Amendment
1	2012	12	The Factoring Regulation Act, 2011	In section 31A, in sub-section (3), for the words "that Central Government", the words "that Government" shall be substituted
