= Repealing and Amending Act, 2015 =

Parliament of India
- Long title: An Act to repeal certain enactments and to amend certain other enactments.
- Citation: Act No. 17 of 2015
- Territorial extent: India
- Passed by: Lok Sabha
- Passed: 18 March 2015
- Passed by: Rajya Sabha
- Passed: 5 May 2015
- Assented to by: President Pranab Mukherjee
- Assented to: 13 May 2015
- Commenced: 13 May 2015

Legislative history

Initiating chamber: Lok Sabha
- Bill title: The Repealing and Amending Bill, 2014
- Bill citation: Bill No. 95 of 2014
- Introduced by: Minister of Law and Justice Ravi Shankar Prasad
- Introduced: 11 August 2014
- Committee report: Standing Committee Report

Related legislation
- Repealing and Amending (Second) Act, 2015; Repealing and Amending Act, 2016; Repealing and Amending Act, 2017; Repealing and Amending (Second) Act, 2017; Repealing and Amending Act, 2019; Repealing and Amending Act, 2023
- Status: Spent

The Repealing and Amending Act, 2015 is an Act passed by the Parliament of India in May 2015 that repealed 35 obsolete Acts, and also amended the provisions of The Prohibition of Manual Scavengers Act, 2013, and the Whistle Blowers Protection Act, 2011 to correct typographical and certain patent errors. It was the first such repealing Act aimed at repealing obsolete laws tabled in Parliament by the Narendra Modi administration.

== Background and legislative history ==
Prime Minister Narendra Modi advocated the repeal of old laws during his 2014 general election campaign. At the 2015 Economic Times Global Business Summit, Modi stated, "Our country suffers from an excess of old and unnecessary laws which obstruct people and businesses. We began the exercise of identifying unnecessary laws and repealing them. 1,877 Central laws have been identified for repeal."

The Repealing and Amending Bill, 2014 was introduced in the Lok Sabha on 11 August 2014 by the Minister of Law and Justice, Ravi Shankar Prasad. The bill sought to repeal 36 Acts and pass amendments to two Acts. The bill sought to completely repeal The Indian Fisheries Act, 1897, The Foreign Jurisdiction Act, 1947, The Sugar Undertakings (Taking Over of Management) Act, 1978 and The Employment of Manual Scavengers and Construction of Dry Latrines (Prohibition) Act, 1993. The remaining 32 were all amending acts whose changes had been incorporated into the existing Acts. The bill also sought to amend provisions of The Prohibition of Manual Scavengers Act, 2013, and The Whistle Blowers Protection Act, 2011 so as to correct typographical and certain patent errors, such as the year of enactment.

The bill was referred to the Parliamentary Standing Committee on Personnel, Public Grievances, Law and Justice on 22 September. The Committee submitted its report on the bill on 19 December 2015. The report recommended that the bill be passed, however, it opposed the repeal of the Manual Scavenging and Construction of Dry Latrines (Prohibition) Act, 1993. The Committee also suggested that the government consider adding a sunset clause to amending act to ensure that they would be repealed automatically and would not remain in the statute books after their purpose was achieved.

The bill, as recommended by the Committee, was passed by the Lok Sabha on 18 March and by the Rajya Sabha on 5 May 2015. The bill received assent from President Pranab Mukherjee on 13 May 2015, and was notified in The Gazette of India on the same day.

== Repealed Acts ==
The following 35 acts, included in the bill's First Schedule, were completely repealed:

№	Year	Act No.	Short title	Extent of repeal
1	1897	4	The Indian Fisheries Act, 1897	The whole
2	1947	47	The Foreign Jurisdiction Act, 1947	The whole
3	1978	49	The Sugar Undertakings (Taking Over of Management) Act, 1978	The whole
4	1999	30	The Representation of the People (Amendment) Act, 1999	The whole
5	1999	33	The Indian Majority (Amendment) Act, 1999	The whole
6	1999	34	The Administrators-General (Amendment) Act, 1999	The whole
7	1999	36	The Notaries (Amendment) Act, 1999	The whole
8	1999	39	The Marriage Laws (Amendment) Act, 1999	The whole
9	2001	30	The Repealing and Amending Act, 2001	The whole
10	2001	49	The Mariage Laws (Amendment) Act, 2001	The whole
11	2001	51	The Indian Divorce (Amendment) Act, 2001	The whole
12	2002	26	The Indian Succession (Amendment) Act, 2002	The whole
13	2002	37	The Legal Services Authorities (Amendment) Act, 2002	The whole
14	2002	72	The Representation of the People (Third Amendment) Act, 2002	The whole
15	2003	3	The Transfer of Property (Amendment) Act, 2002	The whole
16	2003	4	The Indian Evidence (Amendment) Act, 2002	The whole
17	2003	6	The Representation of the People (Second Amendment) Act, 2002	The whole
18	2003	9	The Representation of the People (Amendment) Act, 2002	The whole
19	2003	24	The Election Laws (Amendment) Act, 2003	The whole
20	2003	40	The Representation of the People (Amendment) Act, 2003	The whole
21	2003	46	The Election and Other Related Laws (Amendment) Act, 2003	The whole
22	2003	50	The Marriage Laws (Amendment) Act, 2003	The whole
23	2004	2	The Representation of the People (Second Amendment) Act, 2003	The whole
24	2004	3	The Delimitation (Amendment) Act, 2003	The whole
25	2005	4	The Delegated Legislation Provisions (Amendment) Act, 2004	The whole
26	2005	39	The Hindu Succession (Amendment) Act, 2005	The whole
27	2006	31	The Parliament (Prevention of Disqualification) Amendment Act, 2006	The whole
28	2008	9	The Delimitation (Amendment) Act, 2008	The whole
29	2008	10	The Representation of the People (Amendment) Act, 2008	The whole
30	2009	41	The Representation of the People (Amendment) Act, 2009	The whole
31	2010	30	The Personal Laws (Amendment) Act, 2010	The whole
32	2010	36	The Representation of the People (Amendment) Act, 2010	The whole
33	2012	29	The Anand Marriage (Amendment) Act, 2012	The whole
34	2012	33	The Administrators-General (Amendment) Act, 2012	The whole
35	2013	28	The Parliament (Prevention of Disqualification) Amendment Act, 2013	The whole
