= Repealing and Amending (Second) Act, 2017 =

Act of the Parliament of India

Parliament of India
- Long title: An Act to repeal certain enactments and to amend certain other enactments.
- Citation: Act No. 4 of 2018
- Territorial extent: India
- Passed by: Lok Sabha
- Passed: 19 December 2017
- Passed by: Rajya Sabha
- Passed: 28 December 2017
- Assented to by: President Ram Nath Kovind
- Assented to: 5 January 2018
- Commenced: 8 January 2018

Legislative history

Initiating chamber: Lok Sabha
- Bill title: The Repealing and Amending (Second) Bill, 2017
- Bill citation: Bill No. 164 of 2017
- Introduced by: Minister of Law and Justice Ravi Shankar Prasad
- Introduced: 11 August 2017

Related legislation
- Repealing and Amending Act, 2015; Repealing and Amending (Second) Act, 2015; Repealing and Amending Act, 2016; Repealing and Amending Act, 2017; Repealing and Amending Act, 2019; Repealing and Amending Act, 2023
- Status: Spent

The Repealing and Amending (Second) Act, 2017 is an act of the Parliament of India that repealed 131 acts, and nine Ordinances promulgated by the Governor-General of India before independence. It also made minor amendments to the Plantations Labour Act, 1951, the Juvenile Justice (Care and Protection of Children) Act, 2015, and the Rights of Persons with Disabilities Act, 2016. The Act was the fifth such repealing act tabled by the Narendra Modi administration aimed at repealing obsolete laws.

== Background and legislative history ==
Prime Minister Narendra Modi had advocated the repeal of old laws during his 2014 general election campaign. At the 2015 Economic Times Global Business Summit, Modi stated, "Our country suffers from an excess of old and unnecessary laws which obstruct people and businesses. We began the exercise of identifying unnecessary laws and repealing them. 1,877 Central laws have been identified for repeal."

The Repealing and Amending (Second) Bill, 2017 was introduced in the Lok Sabha on 11 August 2017 by the Minister of Law and Justice, Ravi Shankar Prasad. The bill sought to repeal 131 Acts, including over 30 Acts enacted before independence, and also sought to repeal 9 Ordinances promulgated by the Governor General of India before independence. It also sought to make minor amendments to delete some provisions, and rectify drafting errors in The Plantations Labour Act, 1951, The Juvenile Justice (Care and Protection of Children) Act, 2015, and The Rights of Persons with Disabilities Act, 2016.

The bill was passed by the Lok Sabha on 19 December 2017 and by the Rajya Sabha on 28 December 2017. The bill received assent from President Ram Nath Kovind on 5 January 2018, and was notified in The Gazette of India on 8 January 2018.

== Repealed Acts ==
The 131 Acts included in the bill's First Schedule were completely repealed.

No.	Year	Act No.	Short title
1	1850	XXI	The Caste Disabilities Removal Act, 1850
2	1857	VII	The Madras Uncovenanted Officers Act, 1857
3	1857	XXI	The Howrah Offences Act, 1857
4	1859	XII	The Calcutta Pilots Act, 1859
5	1862	III	The Government Seal Act, 1862
6	1873	XVI	The North-Western Provinces Village and Road Police Act, 1873
7	1875	XX	The Central Provinces Laws Act, 1875
8	1876	XIX	The Dramatic Performances Act, 1876
9	1879	XIV	The Hackney-carriage Act, 1879
10	1879	XIX	The Raipur and Khattra Laws Act, 1879
11	1881	XIII	The Fort William Act, 1881
12	1882	XXI	The Madras Forest (Validation) Act, 1882
13	1883	X	The Bikrama Singh's Estates Act, 1883
14	1886	XXI	The Oudh Wasikas Act, 1886
15	1888	III	The Police Act, 1888
16	1888	VIII	The Indian Tolls Act, 1888
17	1893	II	The Porahat Estate Act, 1893
18	1895	XV	The Government Grants Act, 1895
19	1897	VIII	The Reformatory Schools Act, 1897
20	1911	X	The Prevention of Seditious Meetings Act, 1911
21	1912	VII	The Bengal, Bihar and Orissa and Assam Laws Act, 1912
22	1917	XXV	The Sir Currimbhoy Ebrahim Baronetcy (Amendment) Act, 1917
23	1921	XVII	The Cattle-trespass (Amendment) Act, 1921
24	1931	XX	The Sheriff of Calcutta (Powers of Custody) Act, 1931
25	1932	XI	The Public Suits Validation Act, 1932
26	1932	XXIV	The Bengal Suppression of Terrorist Outrages (Supplementary) Act, 1932
27	1938	XX	The Criminal Law Amendment Act, 1938
28	1941	IV	The Berar Laws Act, 1941
29	1942	XVIII	The Weekly Holidays Act, 1942
30	1943	XXIII	The War Injuries (Compensation Insurance) Act, 1943
31	1947	XVI	The Trading with the Enemy (Continuance of Emergency Provisions) Act, 1947
32	1948	26	The Junagadh Administration (Property) Act, 1948
33	1949	51	The Requisitioned Land (Apportionment of Compensation) Act, 1949
34	1949	61	The Professions Tax Limitation (Amendment and Validation) Act, 1949
35	1950	IV	The Preventive Detention Act, 1950
36	1950	L	The Preventive Detention (Amendment) Act, 1950
37	1950	67	The Cooch-Behar (Assimilation of Laws) Act, 1950
38	1951	3	The Part B States (Laws) Act, 1951
39	1951	IV	The Preventive Detention (Amendment) Act, 1951
40	1951	51	The Railway Companies (Emergency Provisions) Act, 1951
41	1951	66	The Part C States (Miscellaneous Laws) Repealing Act, 1951
42	1951	70	The Displaced Persons (Debts Adjustment) Act, 1951
43	1952	1	The Part B States Marriages Validating Act, 1952
44	1952	XXXIV	The Preventive Detention (Amendment) Act, 1952
45	1952	LXI	The Preventive Detention (Second Amendment) Act, 1952
46	1954	4	The Abducted Persons (Recovery and Restoration) Amendment Act, 1954
47	1954	7	The Government of Part C States (Amendment) Act, 1954
48	1954	15	The Transfer of Evacuee Deposits Act, 1954
49	1954	20	The Absorbed Areas (Laws) Act, 1954
50	1954	36	The Chandernagore (Merger) Act, 1954
51	1954	51	The Preventive Detention (Amendment) Act, 1954
52	1955	19	The Commanders-in-Chief (Change in Designation) Act, 1955
53	1955	30	The Abducted Persons (Recovery and Restoration) Continuance Act, 1955
54	1956	4	The Bar Councils (Validation of State Laws) Act, 1956
55	1956	50	The Indian Cotton Cess (Amendment) Act, 1956
56	1956	65	The Abducted Persons (Recovery and Restoration) Continuance Act, 1956
57	1956	88	The Representation of the People (Miscellaneous Provisions) Act, 1956
58	1956	97	The Delhi Tenants (Temporary Protection) Act, 1956
59	1957	32	The Forward Contracts (Regulation) Amendment Act, 1957
60	1957	37	The Legislative Councils Act, 1957
61	1957	54	The Preventive Detention (Continuance) Act, 1957
62	1959	24	The Pharmacy (Amendment) Act, 1959
63	1960	31	The Tripura Municipal Law (Repeal) Act, 1960
64	1960	47	The Bilaspur Commercial Corporation (Repeal) Act, 1960
65	1960	48	The Mahendra Pratab Singh Estates (Repeal) Act, 1960
66	1960	53	The Tripura Excise Law (Repeal) Act, 1960
67	1962	62	The Emergency Risks (Goods) Insurance Act, 1962
68	1962	63	The Emergency Risks (Factories) Insurance Act, 1962
69	1963	29	The Institutes of Technology (Amendment) Act, 1963
70	1963	56	The Delhi Development (Amendment) Act, 1963
71	1964	23	The Delhi (Delegation of Powers) Act, 1964
72	1965	50	The Goa, Daman and Diu (Absorbed Employees) Act, 1965.
73	1967	16	The Anti-Corruption Laws (Amendment) Act, 1967
74	1969	41	The International Monetary Fund and Bank (Amendment) Act, 1969
75	1971	65	The Asian Refractories Limited (Acquisition of Undertaking) Act, 1971
76	1971	68	The Uttar Pradesh Cantonments (Control of Rent and Eviction) (Repeal) Act, 1971
77	1972	36	The Coking Coal Mines (Nationalisation) Act, 1972
78	1973	26	The Coal Mines (Nationalisation) Act, 1973
79	1975	19	The All-India Services Regulations (Indemnity) Act, 1975
80	1976	22	The Assam Sillimanite Limited (Acquisition and Transfer of Refractory Plant) Act, 1976
81	1976	28	The Parliamentary Proceedings (Protection of Publication) Repeal Act, 1976
82	1976	76	The National Library of India Act, 1976
83	1976	89	The Indian Iron and Steel Company (Acquisition of Shares) Act, 1976
84	1976	96	The Braithwaite and Company (India) Limited (Acquisition and Transfer of Undertakings) Act, 1976
85	1977	16	The Disputed Elections (Prime Minister and Speaker) Act, 1977
86	1977	41	The Smith, Stainstreet and Company Limited (Acquisition and Transfer of Undertakings) Act, 1977
87	1977	42	The Gresham and Craven of India (Private) Limited (Acquisition and Transfer of Undertakings) Act, 1977
88	1978	13	The Hindustan Tractors Limited (Acquisition and Transfer of Undertakings) Act, 1978
89	1978	42	The Bolani Ores Limited (Acquisition of Shares) and Miscellaneous Provisions Act, 1978
90	1979	12	The Punjab Excise (Delhi Amendment) Act, 1979
91	1980	58	The Bengal Chemical and Pharmaceutical Works Limited (Acquisition and Transfer of Undertakings) Act, 1980
92	1983	35	The Dangerous Machines (Regulation) Act, 1983
93	1984	39	The Punjab Municipal (New Delhi Amendment) Act, 1984
94	1984	43	The Aluminium Corporation of India Limited (Acquisition and Transfer of Aluminium Undertaking) Act, 1984
95	1984	57	The Bengal Immunity Company Limited (Acquisition and Transfer of Undertakings) Act, 1984
96	1985	80	The Customs (Amendment) Act, 1985
97	1987	36	The Brentford Electric (India) Limited (Acquisition and Transfer of Undertakings) Act, 1987
98	1993	24	The National Thermal Power Corporation Limited, the National Hydroelectric Power Corporation Limited and the North-Eastern Electric Power Corporation Limited (Acquisition and Transfer of Power Transmission Systems) Act, 1993
99	1994	56	The Neyveli Lignite Corporation Limited (Acquisition and Transfer of Power Transmission System) Act, 1994
100	1999	6	The Delhi Development Authority (Validation of Disciplinary Powers) Act, 1998
101	1999	8	The Customs (Amendment) Act, 1998
102	1999	49	The Copyright (Amendment) Act, 1999
103	2000	20	The Direct-tax Laws (Miscellaneous) Repeal Act, 2000
104	2000	48	The Forfeiture (Repeal) Act, 2000
105	2001	33	The Influx from Pakistan (Control) Repealing (Repeal) Act, 2001
106	2001	36	The Indian Universities (Repeal) Act, 2001
107	2001	37	The Auroville (Emergency Provisions) Repeal Act, 2001
108	2001	41	The Central Sales Tax (Amendment) Act, 2001
109	2001	47	The Two-Member Constituencies (Abolition) and other Laws Repeal Act, 2001
110	2002	57	The Mysore State Legislature (Delegation of Powers) Repeal Act, 2002
111	2002	65	The Countess of Dufferin's Fund (Repeal) Act, 2002
112	2002	66	The Prevention of Food Adulteration (Extension to Kohima and Mokokchung Districts) Repeal Act, 2002
113	2002	70	The Refugee Relief Taxes (Abolition) Repeal Act, 2002
114	2003	2	The Cable Television Networks (Regulation) Amendment Act, 2002
115	2005	38	The Displaced Persons Claims and other Laws Repeal Act, 2005
116	2005	44	The Immigration (Carriers' Liability) Amendment Act, 2005
117	2006	3	The Central Sales Tax (Amendment) Act, 2005
118	2006	18	The National Commission for Minority Educational Institutions (Amendment) Act, 2006
119	2006	24	The Cess Laws (Repealing and Amending) Act, 2006
120	2006	29	The Taxation Laws (Amendment) Act, 2006
121	2006	32	The Spirituous Preparations (Inter-State Trade and Commerce) Control (Repeal) Act, 2006
122	2006	46	The Produce Cess Laws (Abolition) Act, 2006
123	2006	49	The Indian Rifles (Repeal) Act, 2006
124	2007	24	The Mizoram University (Amendment) Act, 2007
125	2007	39	The Competition (Amendment) Act, 2007
126	2008	25	The Central Universities Laws (Amendment) Act, 2008
127	2009	39	The Competition (Amendment) Act, 2009
128	2010	20	The National Commission for Minority Educational Institutions (Amendment) Act, 2010
129	2010	33	The Jharkhand Panchayat Raj (Amendment) Act, 2010
130	2012	27	The Copyright (Amendment) Act, 2012
131	2012	31	The Central Educational Institutions (Reservation in Admission) Amendment Act, 2012
Ordinances made by the Governor-General
1	1941	VII	The War Injuries Ordinance, 1941
2	1942	XX	The Collective Fines Ordinance, 1942
3	1942	XLI	The Armed Forces (Special Powers) Ordinance, 1942
4	1944	XXI	The Public Health (Emergency Provisions) Ordinance, 1944
5	1945	XXIV	The War Gratuities (Income-tax Exemption) Ordinance, 1945
6	1945	XXX	The Secunderabad Marriage Validating Ordinance, 1945
7	1946	II	The Bank Notes (Declaration of Holdings) Ordinance, 1946
8	1946	VI	The Criminal Law Amendment Ordinance, 1946
9	1946	X	The Termination of War (Definition) Ordinance, 1946
