= Repealing and Amending Act, 2016 =

Parliament of India
- Long title: An Act to repeal certain enactments and to amend certain other enactments.
- Citation: Act No. 23 of 2016
- Territorial extent: India
- Passed by: Lok Sabha
- Passed: 6 August 2015
- Passed by: Rajya Sabha
- Passed: 27 April 2016
- Assented to by: President Pranab Mukherjee
- Assented to: 6 May 2016
- Commenced: 9 May 2016

Legislative history

Initiating chamber: Lok Sabha
- Bill title: The Repealing and Amending (Fourth) Bill, 2015
- Bill citation: Bill No. 194-C of 2015
- Introduced by: Minister of Law and Justice Sadananda Gowda
- Introduced: 27 July 2015

Related legislation
- Repealing and Amending Act, 2015; Repealing and Amending (Second) Act, 2015; Repealing and Amending Act, 2017; Repealing and Amending (Second) Act, 2017; Repealing and Amending Act, 2019; Repealing and Amending Act, 2023
- Status: Spent

The Repealing and Amending Act, 2016 is an Act of the Parliament of India that repealed 295 Acts, and also made minor amendments to the Sexual Harassment of Women at the Work Place (Prevention, Prohibition and Redressal) Act, 2013, and the Governors (Emoluments, Allowances and Privileges) Amendment Act, 2014. The Act was the third such repealing act tabled by the Narendra Modi administration aimed at repealing obsolete laws.

== Background and legislative history ==
Prime Minister Narendra Modi had advocated the repeal of old laws during his 2014 general election campaign. At the 2015 Economic Times Global Business Summit, Modi stated, "Our country suffers from an excess of old and unnecessary laws which obstruct people and businesses. We began the exercise of identifying unnecessary laws and repealing them. 1,877 Central laws have been identified for repeal."

The Repealing and Amending (Fourth) Bill, 2015 was introduced in the Lok Sabha on 27 July 2015 by the Minister of Law and Justice, D.V. Sadananda Gowda. The bill sought to repeal 295 Acts, including over 20 Acts enacted before independence, and pass amendments to two Acts. The Bill sought to replace the term "Local Complaints Committee" with "Local Committee", and "Internal Complaints Committee" with "Internal Committee" in the Sexual Harassment of Women at the Work Place (Prevention, Prohibition and Redressal) Act, 2013.

The bill was passed by the Lok Sabha on 6 August 2015. Before being passed, the Lok Sabha officially renamed the bill as the Repealing and Amending (Third) Bill, 2015. The Bill, as passed by the Lok Sabha, was passed by the Rajya Sabha on 27 April 2016. The bill received assent from President Pranab Mukherjee on 6 May, and was notified in The Gazette of India on 9 May 2016.

== Repealed Acts ==
The 295 Acts included in the bill's First Schedule were completely repealed.

No.	Year	Act No.	Short title	Extent of Repeal
1	1863	16	The Excise (Spirits) Act, 1863	So much as is not repealed.
2	1874	4	The Foreign Recruiting Act, 1874	So much as is not repealed.
3	1875	18	The Indian Law Reports Act, 1875	So much as is not repealed.
4	1879	6	The Elephants Preservation Act, 1879	So much as is not repealed.
5	1890	13	The Excise (Malt Liquors) Act, 1890	The whole.
6	1898	3	The Lepers Act, 1898	The whole.
7	1902	4	The Indian Tramways Act, 1902	The whole.
8	1912	8	The Wild Birds and Animals Protection Act, 1912	So much as is not repealed.
9	1913	6	The MussalmanWakf Validating Act, 1913	The whole.
10	1916	7	The Indian Medical Degrees Act, 1916	The whole.
11	1919	1	The Local Authorities Pensions and Gratuities Act, 1919	The whole.
12	1930	32	The MussalmanWakf Validating Act, 1930	The whole.
13	1933	2	The Children (Pledging of Labour) Act, 1933	The whole.
14	1936	18	The Red Cross Society (Allocation of Property) Act, 1936	The whole.
15	1936	22	The Indian Companies (Amendment) Act, 1936	The whole.
16	1938	24	The Employers’ Liability Act, 1938	The whole.
17	1940	12	The Income-tax Law Amendment Act, 1940	So much as is not repealed.
18	1941	22	The Indian Merchant Shipping (Amendment) Act, 1941	The whole.
19	1941	23	The Indian Income-tax (Amendment) Act, 1941	The whole.
20	1941	24	The Excess Profits Tax (Second Amendment) Act, 1941	The whole.
21	1941	25	The Railways (Local Authorities' Taxation) Act, 1941	The whole.
22	1947	44	The Income-tax and Business Profits Tax (Amendment) Act, 1947	The whole.
23	1947	45	The Indian Trade Unions (Amendment) Act, 1947	The whole.
24	1948	38	The Continuance of Legal Proceedings Act, 1948	The whole.
25	1948	48	The Income-tax and Business Profits Tax (Amendment) Act, 1948	The whole.
26	1948	58	The Exchange of Prisoners Act, 1948	The whole.
27	1948	60	The Resettlement of Displaced Persons (Land Acquisition) Act, 1948	The whole.
28	1949	24	The Delhi Hotels (Control of Accommodation) Act, 1949	The whole.
29	1949	53	The Indian Merchant Shipping (Amendment) Act, 1949	The whole.
30	1949	59	The Merged States (Laws) Act, 1949	The whole.
31	1950	9	The Indian Tea Control (Amendment) Act, 1950	The whole.
32	1950	26	The Drugs (Control) Act, 1950	So much as is not repealed.
33	1950	52	The Essential Supplies (Temporary Powers) Amendment Act, 1950	The whole.
34	1950	71	The Indian Income-tax (Amendment) Act, 1950	The whole.
35	1950	72	The Essential Supplies (Temporary Powers) Second Amendment Act, 1950	The whole.
36	1951	42	The Indian Merchant Shipping (Amendment) Act, 1951	The whole.
37	1951	59	The Delhi Premises (Requisition and Eviction) Amendment Act, 1951	The whole.
38	1952	9	The Indian Independence Pakistan Courts (Pending Proceedings) Act, 1952	So much as is not repealed.
39	1952	49	The Indian Tea Control (Amendment) Act, 1952	The whole.
40	1952	54	The Central Tea Board (Amendment) Act, 1952	The whole.
41	1953	23	The Indian Merchant Shipping (Amendment) Act, 1953	The whole.
42	1953	25	The Indian Income-tax (Amendment) Act, 1953	The whole.
43	1953	54	The Reserve Bank of India (Amendment and Miscellaneous Provisions) Act, 1953	So much as is not repealed.
44	1954	9	The Control of Shipping (Amendment) Act, 1954	The whole.
45	1954	13	The Press (Objectionable Matter) Amendment Act, 1954	The whole.
46	1954	23	The State Acquisition of Lands for Union Purposes (Validation) Act, 1954	The whole.
47	1954	33	The Indian Income-tax (Amendment) Act, 1954	The whole.
48	1954	41	The Taxation Laws (Extension to Jammu and Kashmir) Act, 1954	The whole.
49	1954	53	The Prevention of Disqualification (Parliament and Part C States Legislatures) Second Amendment Act, 1954	The whole.
50	1955	29	The Industrial Disputes (Appellate Tribunal) Amendment Act, 1955	The whole.
51	1955	52	The Prevention of Disqualification (Parliament and Part C States Legislatures) Amendment Act, 1955	The whole.
52	1956	10	The Control of Shipping (Continuance) Act, 1956	The whole.
53	1956	26	The Indian Income-tax (Amendment) Act, 1956	The whole.
54	1956	36	The Industrial Disputes (Amendment and Miscellaneous Provisions) Act, 1956	So much as is not repealed.
55	1956	45	The Newspaper (Price and Page) Act, 1956	The whole.
56	1956	52	The Government Premises (Eviction) Amendment Act, 1956	The whole.
57	1956	63	The Scheduled Castes and Scheduled Tribes Orders (Amendment) Act, 1956	The whole.
58	1956	95	The Banking Companies (Amendment) Act, 1956	So much as is not repealed.
59	1957	17	The Life Insurance Corporation (Amendment) Act, 1957	So much as is not repealed.
60	1957	47	The Indian Telegraph (Amendment) Act, 1957	The whole.
61	1957	53	The Indian Railways (Amendment) Act, 1957	So much as is not repealed.
62	1957	64	The Prevention of Disqualification (Amendment) Act, 1957	The whole.
63	1958	9	The Control of Shipping (Continuance) Act, 1958	The whole.
64	1958	33	The Estate Duty (Amendment) Act, 1958	So much as is not repealed.
65	1958	35	The Manipur and Tripura (Repeal of Laws) Act, 1958	The whole.
66	1958	54	The Prevention of Disqualification (Amendment) Act, 1958	The whole.
67	1959	1	The Indian Income-tax (Amendment) Act, 1959	The whole.
68	1959	17	The Coal Grading Board (Repeal) Act, 1959	The whole.
69	1959	29	The Public Wakfs (Extension of Limitation) Act, 1959	The whole
70	1960	16	The Estate Duty (Amendment) Act, 1960	So much as is not repealed.
71	1960	18	The Indian Boilers (Amendment) Act, 1960	So much as is not repealed.
72	1960	28	The Taxation Laws (Amendment) Act, 1960	The whole
73	1960	45	The Indian Museum (Amendment) Act, 1960	So much as is not repealed.
74	1960	54	The Railway Passenger Fares (Amendment) Act, 1960	The whole
75	1960	65	The Companies (Amendment) Act, 1960	So much as is not repealed.
76	1961	7	The Banking Companies (Amendment) Act, 1961	So much as is not repealed.
77	1961	36	The Newspaper (Price and Page) Continuance Act, 1961	The whole
78	1961	55	The Sugar (Regulation of Production) Act, 1961	The whole
79	1962	17	The Air Corporations (Amendment) Act, 1962	So much as is not repealed.
80	1962	43	The Companies (Amendment) Act, 1962	The whole
81	1962	56	The State-Associated Banks (Miscellaneous Provisions) Act, 1962	So much as is not repealed.
82	1962	59	The Personal Injuries (Emergency Provisions) Act, 1962	The whole
83	1963	21	The Compulsory Deposit Scheme Act, 1963	The whole
84	1963	37	The Personal Injuries (Compensation Insurance) Act, 1963	The whole
85	1963	53	The Companies (Amendment) Act, 1963	The whole
86	1964	32	The Companies (Amendment) Act, 1964	The whole
87	1965	23	The Banking Laws (Application to Co-operative Societies) Act, 1965	So much as is not repealed.
88	1965	31	The Companies (Amendment) Act, 1965	The whole
89	1966	21	The Merchant Shipping (Amendment) Act, 1966	So much as is not repealed.
90	1966	30	The Electricity (Supply) Amendment Act, 1966	So much as is not repealed.
91	1966	37	The Companies (Second Amendment) Act, 1966	The whole
92	1967	14	The Essential Commodities (Amendment) Act, 1967	So much as is not repealed.
93	1967	25	The Standards of Weights and Measures (Extension to Kohima and Mokokchung Districts) Act, 1967	The whole
94	1968	60	The State Agricultural Credit Corporations Act, 1968	The whole
95	1969	17	The Companies (Amendment) Act, 1969	So much as is not repealed.
96	1969	22	The Banking Companies (Acquisition and Transfer of Undertakings) Act, 1969	The whole
97	1969	23	The Coal Bearing Areas (Acquisition and Development) Amendment Act, 1969	So much as is not repealed.
98	1969	28	The Central Sales Tax (Amendment) Act, 1969	So much as is not repealed.
99	1969	37	The Delhi High Court (Amendment) Act, 1969	So much as is not repealed.
100	1969	38	The Wakf (Amendment) Act, 1969	So much as is not repealed.
101	1970	24	The Petroleum (Amendment) Act, 1970	So much as is not repealed.
102	1970	25	The Merchant Shipping (Amendment) Act, 1970	So much as is not repealed.
103	1970	51	The Central Labour Laws (Extension to Jammu and Kashmir) Act, 1970	The whole
104	1971	63	The Jayanti Shipping Company (Acquisition of Shares) Act, 1971	The whole
105	1971	64	The Coking Coal Mines (Emergency Provisions) Act, 1971	The whole
106	1972	58	The Indian Copper Corporation (Acquisition of Undertaking) Act, 1972	So much as is not repealed.
107	1972	72	The Sick Textile Undertakings (Taking Over of Management) Act, 1972	The whole
108	1973	15	The Coal Mines (Taking Over of Management) Act, 1973	The whole
109	1973	62	The Konkan Passenger Ships (Acquisition) Act, 1973	The whole
110	1974	4	The Esso (Acquisition of Undertakings in India) Act, 1974	The whole
111	1974	37	The Additional Emoluments (Compulsory Deposit) Act, 1974	The whole
112	1976	2	The Burmah Shell (Acquisition of Undertakings in India) Act, 1976	The whole
113	1976	97	The Burn Company and Indian Standard Wagon Company (Nationalisation) Act, 1976	The whole
114	1976	98	The Laxmirattan and Atherton West Cotton Mills (Taking Over of Management) Act, 1976	The whole
115	1976	106	The Untouchability (Offences) Amendment and Miscellaneous Provision Act, 1976	So much as is not repealed.
116	1977	17	The Caltex [Acquisition of Shares of Caltex Oil Refining (India) Limited and of the Undertakings in India of Caltex (India) Limited] Act, 1977	The whole
117	1978	21	The Deposit Insurance Corporation (Amendment and Miscellaneous Provisions) Act, 1978	The whole
118	1979	28	The Kosangas Company (Acquisition of Undertaking) Act, 1979	The whole
119	1980	64	The Maruti Limited (Acquisition and Transfer of Undertakings) Act, 1980	The whole
120	1981	18	The Essential Commodities (Special Provisions) Act, 1981	The whole
121	1981	19	The Prevention of Blackmarketing and Maintenance of Supplies of Essential Commodities (Amendment) Act, 1981	So much as is not repealed.
122	1981	41	The Burmah Oil Company [Acquisition of Shares of Oil India Limited and of the Undertakings in India of Assam Oil Company Limited and the Burmah Oil Company (India Trading) Limited] Act, 1981	The whole
123	1982	26	The Prevention of Cruelty to Animals (Amendment) Act, 1982	So much as is not repealed.
124	1982	31	The Estate Duty (Amendment) Act,1982	The whole
125	1982	38	The Payment of Wages (Amendment) Act, 1982	The whole
126	1982	50	The Amritsar Oil Works (Acquisition and Transfer of Undertakings) Act, 1982	The whole
127	1982	58	The Central Excise Laws (Amendment and Validation) Act, 1982	The whole
128	1982	68	The Drugs and Cosmetics (Amendment) Act, 1982	So much as is not repealed.
129	1983	29	The National Oilseeds and Vegetable Oils Development Board Act, 1983	The whole
130	1983	40	The Textile Undertakings (Taking Over of Management) Act, 1983	The whole
131	1983	44	The Indian Railways (Amendment) Act, 1983	So much as is not repealed.
132	1983	1	The Banking Laws (Amendment) Act, 1983	The whole
133	1984	16	The Ganesh Flour Mills Company Limited (Acquisition and Transfer of Undertakings) Act, 1984	The whole
134	1984	26	The Payment of Gratuity (Second Amendment) Act, 1984	So much as is not repealed.
135	1984	33	The Mogul Line Limited (Acquisition of Shares) Act, 1984	The whole
136	1984	34	The Essential Commodities (Amendment) Act, 1984	The whole
137	1984	38	The Delhi Development (Amendment) Act, 1984	The whole
138	1984	45	The Employees’ State Insurance (Amendment) Act, 1984	So much as is not repealed.
139	1984	53	The Estate Duty (Amendment) Act, 1984	The whole
140	1984	54	The Levy Sugar Price Equalisation Fund (Amendment) Act, 1984	So much as is not repealed
141	1984	59	The University Grants Commission (Amendment) Act, 1984	So much as is not repealed
142	1984	63	The Dowry Prohibition (Amendment) Act, 1984	The whole.
143	1984	67	The Taxation Laws (Amendment) Act, 1984	The whole.
144	1985	3	The General Insurance Business (Nationalisation) Amendment Act, 1985	So much as is not repealed
145	1985	83	The Futwah-Islampur Light Railway Line (Nationalisation) Act, 1985	The whole.
146	1986	33	The Merchant Shipping (Amendment) Act, 1986	So much as is not repealed
147	1986	66	The Shipping Development Fund Committee (Abolition) Act, 1986	The whole.
148	1987	27	The National Security (Amendment) Act, 1987	The whole.
149	1987	43	The Constitution (Scheduled Tribes) Order (Amendment) Act, 1987	The whole.
150	1989	3	The Direct Tax Laws (Amendment) Act, 1989	The whole.
151	1989	29	The Employees' State Insurance (Amendment) Act, 1989	So much as is not repealed.
152	1991	2	The Taxation Laws (Amendment) Act, 1991	The whole except section 6.
153	1991	34	The Consumer Protection (Amendment) Act, 1991	So much as is not repealed.
154	1991	44	The Wildlife (Protection) Amendment Act, 1991	So much as is not repealed.
155	1991	60	The Delhi High Court (Amendment) Act, 1991	So much as is not repealed.
156	1993	49	The Betwa River Board (Amendment) Act, 1993	So much as is not repealed.
157	1994	27	The Punjab Gram Panchayat, Samitis and Zilla Parishad (Chandigarh Repeal) Act, 1994	The whole.
158	1998	2	The Cotton Ginning and Pressing Factories (Repeal) Act, 1998	The whole.
159	1998	4	The Railway Claims Tribunal (Amendment) Act, 1998	The whole.
160	1998	11	The Income-tax (Second Amendment) Act, 1998	The whole.
161	1999	17	The Patents (Amendment) Act, 1999	The whole.
162	1999	21	The Companies (Amendment) Act, 1999	The whole.
163	1999	28	The Income-tax (Amendment) Act, 1999	The whole.
164	1999	38	The Mines and Minerals (Regulation and Development) Amendment Act, 1999	The whole.
165	2000	2	The Telecom Regulatory Authority of India (Amendment) Act, 2000	The whole.
166	2000	19	The Cotton Textiles Cess (Repeal) Act, 2000	The whole
167	2000	24	The Indian Companies (Foreign Interests) and the Companies (Temporary Restrictions on Dividends) Repeal Act, 2000	The whole
168	2000	25	The Cotton Cloth (Repeal) Act, 2000	The whole
169	2000	26	The Iron and Steel (Amalgamation and Takeover Laws) Repeal Act, 2000	The whole
170	2000	27	The Motor Vehicles (Amendment) Act, 2000	The whole
171	2000	31	The Army and Air Force (Disposal of Private Property) Amendment Act, 2000	The whole
172	2000	32	The Indian Power Alcohol (Repeal) Act, 2000	The whole
173	2000	33	The All-India Institute of Medical Sciences (Amendment) Act, 2000	The whole
174	2000	36	The Cable Television Networks (Regulation) Amendment Act, 2000	The whole
175	2000	38	The Rehabilitation Council of India (Amendment) Act, 2000	The whole
176	2000	46	The Workmen's Compensation (Amendment) Act, 2000	The whole
177	2000	47	The Passport (Entry into India) Amendment Act, 2000	The whole
178	2000	51	The Aircraft (Amendment) Act, 2000	The whole
179	2000	53	The Companies (Amendment) Act, 2000	The whole
180	2001	1	The Taxation Laws (Amendment) Act, 2000	The whole except section 5
181	2001	4	The Taxation Laws (Amendment) Act, 2001	The whole except section 8
182	2001	11	The Insurance Laws (Transfer of Business and Emergency Provisions) Repeal Act, 2001	The whole
183	2001	17	The U.P. Sugarcane Cess (Validation) Repeal Act, 2001	The whole
184	2001	18	The Post-Graduate Institute of Medical Education and Research, Chandigarh (Amendment) Act, 2001	The whole
185	2001	20	The Banking Companies (Legal Practitioners' Clients' Accounts) Repeal Act, 2001	The whole
186	2001	21	The Electricity Regulatory Commissions (Amendment) Act, 2001	The whole
187	2001	28	The Live-stock Importation (Amendment) Act, 2001	The whole
188	2001	31	The Trade Unions (Amendment) Act, 2001	The whole
189	2001	32	The Pre-natal Diagnostic Techniques (Regulation and Prevention of Misuse) Amendment Act, 2001	The whole
190	2001	34	The Indian Medical Council (Amendment) Act, 2001	The whole
191	2001	35	The Sugarcane Cess (Validation) Repeal Act, 2001	The whole
192	2001	44	The Salaries and Allowances of Ministers (Amendment) Act, 2001	The whole
193	2001	55	The National Commission for Safai Karamcharis (Amendment) Act, 2001	The whole
194	2001	56	The Cine-workers Welfare Fund (Amendment) Act, 2001	The whole
195	2001	57	The Companies (Amendment) Act, 2001	The whole
196	2002	13	The Jute Manufactures Cess (Amendment) Act, 2002	The whole
197	2002	17	The Passports (Amendment) Act, 2002	The whole
198	2002	24	The All-India Institute of Medical Sciences (Amendment) Act, 2002	The whole
199	2002	25	The Constitution (Scheduled Castes) Order (Amendment) Act, 2002	The whole
200	2002	32	The Constitution (Scheduled Castes and Scheduled Tribes) Orders (Amendment) Act, 2002	The whole
201	2002	44	The Coast Guard (Amendment) Act, 2002	The whole
202	2002	45	The National Co-operative Development Corporation (Amendment) Act, 2002	The whole
203	2002	50	The Petroleum (Berar Extension) Repeal Act, 2002	The whole
204	2002	61	The Constitution (Scheduled Castes) Orders (Second Amendment) Act, 2002	The whole
205	2002	63	The Merchant Shipping (Amendment) Act, 2002	The whole
206	2002	64	The Medical Termination of Pregnancy (Amendment) Act, 2002	The whole
207	2002	1	The Companies (Amendment) Act, 2002	The whole
208	2002	14	The Pre-natal Diagnostic Techniques (Regulation and Prevention of Misuse) Amendment Act, 2002	The whole
209	2002	16	The Wildlife (Protection) (Amendment) Act, 2002	The whole
210	2003	19	The Water (Prevention and Control of Pollution) Cess (Amendment) Act, 2003	The whole
211	2003	29	The Banking Service Commission (Repeal) Act, 2003	The whole
212	2003	38	The Infant Milk Substitutes, Feeding Bottles and Infant Food (Regulation of Production, Supply and Distribution) Amendment Act, 2003	The whole
213	2003	43	The Airports Authority of India (Amendment) Act, 2003	The whole
214	2003	47	The Constitution (Scheduled Tribes) Order (Amendment) Act, 2003	The whole
215	2003	52	The Railway Protection Force (Amendment)	The whole
216	2003	54	The Taxation Laws (Amendment) Act, 2003	The whole
217	2003	56	The Railways (Amendment) Act, 2003	The whole
218	2003	57	The Electricity (Amendment) Act, 2003	The whole
219	2003	5	The Indian Council of World Affairs (Amendment) Act, 2003	The whole
220	2003	8	The Indian Telegraph (Amendment) Act, 2003	The whole
221	2004	25	The Customs and Central Excise Laws (Repeal) Act, 2004	The whole
222	2005	15	The Patents (Amendment) Act, 2005	The whole
223	2005	23	The Navy (Amendment) Act, 2005	The whole
224	2005	41	The Payment of Wages (Amendment) Act, 2005	The whole
225	2005	47	The Railways (Amendment) Act, 2005	The whole
226	2005	55	The Taxation Laws (Amendment) Act, 2005	The whole
227	2006	7	The Cost and Works Accountants (Amendment) Act, 2006	The whole
228	2006	8	The Company Secretaries (Amendment) Act, 2006	The whole
229	2006	9	The Chartered Accountants (Amendment) Act, 2006	The whole
230	2006	23	The Companies (Amendment) Act, 2006	The whole
231	2006	33	The Juvenile Justice (Care and Protection of Children) Amendment Act, 2006	The whole
232	2006	39	The Wildlife (Protection) Amendment Act, 2006	The whole
233	2006	42	The Central Silk Board (Amendment) Act, 2006	The whole
234	2006	48	The Constitution (Scheduled Tribes) Order Amendment Act, 2006	The whole
235	2006	57	The Indian Telegraph (Amendment) Act, 2006	The whole
236	2006	4	The Commissions for Protection of Child Rights (Amendment) Act, 2006	The whole
237	2007	25	The Cable Television Networks (Regulation) Amendment Act, 2007	The whole
238	2007	26	The Electricity (Amendment) Act, 2007	The whole
239	2007	31	The Constitution (Scheduled Castes) Order (Amendment) Act, 2007	The whole
240	2007	36	The Apprentices (Amendment) Act, 2007	The whole
241	2007	38	The Cigarettes and Other Tobacco Products (Prohibition of Advertisement and Regulation of Trade and Commerce, Production, Supply and Distribution) Amendment Act, 2007	The whole
242	2007	42	The All-India Institute of Medical Sciences and the Post-Graduate Institute of Medical Education and Research (Amendment) Act, 2007	The whole
243	2007	44	The Aircraft (Amendment) Act, 2007	The whole
244	2007	45	The Payment of Bonus (Amendment) Act, 2007	The whole
245	2007	49	The Indian Boilers (Amendment) Act, 2007	The whole
246	2008	11	The Railways (Amendment) Act, 2008	The whole
247	2008	12	The Prasar Bharati (Broadcasting Corporation of India) Amendment Act, 2008	The whole
248	2008	13	The Food Safety and Standards (Amendment) Act, 2008	The whole
249	2008	14	The Constitution (Scheduled Tribes) Order (Amendment) Act, 2008	The whole
250	2008	15	The Maternity Benefit (Amendment) Act, 2008	The whole
251	2008	26	The Drugs and Cosmetics (Amendment) Act, 2008	The whole
252	2008	2	The Constitution (Scheduled Tribes) (Union Territories) Order (Amendment) Act, 2008	The whole
253	2008	3	The Post-Graduate Institute of Medical Education and Research, Chandigarh (Amendment) Act, 2008	The whole
254	2008	10	The Information Technology (Amendment) Act, 2008	The whole
255	2009	28	The Carriage by Air (Amendment) Act, 2009	The whole
256	2009	34	The Metro Railways (Amendment) Act, 2009	The whole
257	2009	45	The Workmen's Compensation (Amendment) Act, 2009	The whole
258	2009	46	The National Rural Employment Guarantee (Amendment) Act, 2009	The whole
259	2009	47	The Payment of Gratuity (Amendment) Act, 2009	The whole
260	2009	2	The Salaries and Allowances of Ministers (Amendment) Act, 2009	The whole
261	2010	15	The Payment of Gratuity (Amendment) Act, 2010	The whole
262	2010	17	The Plantations Labour (Amendment) Act, 2010	The whole
263	2010	18	The Employees' State Insurance (Amendment) Act, 2010	The whole
264	2010	24	The Industrial Disputes (Amendment) Act, 2010	The whole
265	2010	25	The Foreign Trade (Development and Regulation) Amendment Act, 2010	The whole
266	2010	26	The Securities and Insurance Laws (Amendment and Validation) Act, 2010	The whole
267	2010	28	The Energy Conservation (Amendment) Act, 2010	The whole
268	2010	32	The Indian Medical Council (Amendment) Act, 2010	The whole
269	2010	34	The Mines and Minerals (Development and Regulation) Amendment Act, 2010	The whole
270	2010	35	The Essential Commodities (Amendment) Act, 2010	The whole
271	2011	10	The Jawaharlal Institute of Post-Graduate Medical Education and Research, Puducherry (Amendment)	The whole
272	2011	12	The Juvenile Justice (Care and Protection of Children) Amendment Act, 2011	The whole
273	2011	13	The Indian Medical Council (Amendment) Act, 2011	The whole
274	2011	18	The National Council for Teacher Education (Amendment) Act, 2011	The whole
275	2011	21	The Cable Television Networks (Regulation) Amendment Act, 2011	The whole
276	2011	1	The Damodar Valley Corporation (Amendment) Act, 2011	The whole
277	2011	2	The Constitution (Scheduled Tribes) Order (Amendment) Act, 2011	The whole
278	2011	3	The Chartered Accountants (Amendment) Act, 2011	The whole
279	2011	4	The Company Secretaries (Amendment) Act, 2011	The whole
280	2011	6	The Prasar Bharati (Broadcasting Corporation of India) Amendment Act, 2011	The whole
281	2011	9	The Petroleum and Minerals Pipelines (Acquisition of Right of user in Land) Amendment Act, 2011	The whole
282	2011	10	The Cost and Works Accountants (Amendment) Act, 2011	The whole
283	2012	20	The Indian Medical Council (Amendment) Act, 2012	The whole
284	2012	24	The Constitution (Scheduled Tribes) Order (Amendment) Act, 2012	The whole
285	2012	25	The Railway Property (Unlawful Possession) Amendment Act, 2012	The whole
286	2012	30	The Right of Children to Free and Compulsory Education (Amendment) Act, 2012	The whole
287	2012	37	The All-India Institute of Medical Sciences (Amendment) Act, 2012	The whole
288	2012	2	The Prevention of Money-laundering (Amendment) Act, 2012	The whole
289	2012	3	The Unlawful Activities (Prevention) Amendment Act, 2012	The whole
290	2013	13	The Criminal Law (Amendment) Act, 2013	The whole
291	2013	19	The National Highways Authority of India (Amendment) Act, 2013	The whole
292	2013	22	The Securities and Exchange Board of India (Amendment) Act, 2013	The whole
293	2013	24	The Constitution (Scheduled Tribes) Order (Amendment) Act, 2013	The whole
294	2013	29	The Representation of the People (Amendment and Validation) Act, 2013	Sections 2 and 3
