= Repealing and Amending (Second) Act, 2015 =

Parliament of India
- Long title: An Act to repeal certain enactments and to amend certain other enactments.
- Citation: Act No. 19 of 2015
- Territorial extent: India
- Passed by: Lok Sabha
- Passed: 8 December 2014
- Passed by: Rajya Sabha
- Passed: 5 May 2015
- Assented to by: President Pranab Mukherjee
- Assented to: 14 May 2015
- Commenced: 14 May 2015

Legislative history

Initiating chamber: Lok Sabha
- Bill title: The Repealing and Amending (Second) Bill, 2014
- Bill citation: Bill No. 155 of 2014
- Introduced by: Minister of Law and Justice Sadananda Gowda
- Introduced: 3 December 2014
- Committee report: Report of the Select Committee

Related legislation
- Repealing and Amending Act, 2015; Repealing and Amending Act, 2016; Repealing and Amending Act, 2017; Repealing and Amending (Second) Act, 2017; Repealing and Amending Act, 2019; Repealing and Amending Act, 2023
- Status: Spent

The Repealing and Amending (Second) Act, 2015 is an Act of the Parliament of India that repealed 90 obsolete Acts, and also amended the provisions of the Railways (Amendment) Act, 2008 and the Indian Maritime University Act, 2008 to correct typographical errors. The Act was the second such repealing act tabled by the Narendra Modi administration aimed at repealing obsolete laws.

== Background and legislative history ==
Prime Minister Narendra Modi had advocated the repeal of old laws during his 2014 general election campaign. At the 2015 Economic Times Global Business Summit, Modi stated, "Our country suffers from an excess of old and unnecessary laws which obstruct people and businesses. We began the exercise of identifying unnecessary laws and repealing them. 1,877 Central laws have been identified for repeal."

The Repealing and Amending (Second) Bill, 2014 was introduced in the Lok Sabha on 3 December 2014 by the Minister of Law and Justice, D.V. Sadananda Gowda. The bill sought to repeal 90 Acts and amend two Acts. The bill sought to completely repeal 88 Acts. The remaining two were amending acts whose changes had been incorporated into the existing Acts. The bill also sought to amend provisions of the Railways (Amendment) Act, 2008 and the Indian Maritime University Act, 2008 so as to correct typographical errors.

The bill was referred to a Select Committee on 23 December 2014. The Committee submitted its report on the bill on 24 February 2015. The report recommended that the bill be passed, and also suggested adding an "automatic repeal clause" to the Railway Appropriation and Finance Appropriation Acts, as these Acts were only required to be in effect for the duration of one year. The Committee suggested adding similar clauses in other pending Bills as well, and recommended that the Law Ministry consider amending Section 6A of the General Clauses Act, 1897 (related to the effect of repeals) to enable the inclusion of an automatic repeal clause in Bills. The Committee further noted that a review and repeal of obsolete laws should be carried out every 5 years.

The bill, as recommended by the Select Committee, was passed by the Lok Sabha on 8 December 2014 and by the Rajya Sabha on 5 May 2015. The bill received assent from President Pranab Mukherjee on 14 May, and was notified in The Gazette of India on 9 May 2015.

== Repealed Acts ==
Of the 90 acts included in the bill's First Schedule, 88 were completely repealed and two were partially repealed.

| № | Year | Act No. | Short title | Extent of repeal |
|---|---|---|---|---|
| 1 | 1999 | 1 | The Export-Import Bank of India (Amendment) Act, 1998 | The whole |
| 2 | 1999 | 7 | The High Court and Supreme Court Judges (Salaries and Conditions of Service) Amendment Act, 1998 | The whole |
| 3 | 1999 | 16 | The Salary, Allowances and Pension of Members of Parliament (Amendment) Act, 1999 | The whole |
| 4 | 2000 | 1 | The Recovery of Debts Due to Banks and Financial Institutions (Amendment) Act, 2000 | The whole |
| 5 | 2000 | 7 | The Small Industries Development Bank of India (Amendment) Act, 2000 | The whole |
| 6 | 2000 | 12 | The Food Corporations (Amendment) Act, 2000 | The whole |
| 7 | 2000 | 15 | The National Housing Bank (Amendment) Act, 2000 | The whole |
| 8 | 2000 | 17 | The Salary, Allowances and Pension of Members of Parliament (Amendment) Act, 2000 | The whole |
| 9 | 2000 | 18 | The Leaders and Chief Whips of Recognised Parties and Groups in Parliament (Facilities) Amendment Act, 2000 | The whole |
| 10 | 2000 | 22 | The Major Port Trusts (Amendment) Act, 2000 | The whole |
| 11 | 2000 | 23 | The Insecticides (Amendment) Act, 2000 | The whole |
| 12 | 2000 | 35 | The Border Security Force (Amendment) Act, 2000 | The whole |
| 13 | 2000 | 39 | The State Financial Corporations (Amendment) Act, 2000 | The whole |
| 14 | 2000 | 44 | The Multimodal Transportation of Goods (Amendment) Act, 2000 | The whole |
| 15 | 2000 | 55 | The National Bank for Agriculture and Rural Development (Amendment) Act, 2000 | The whole |
| 16 | 2001 | 10 | The Chit Funds (Amendment) Act, 2001 | The whole |
| 17 | 2001 | 23 | The Warehousing Corporations (Amendment) Act, 2001 | The whole |
| 18 | 2001 | 27 | The Warehousing Corporations (Amendment) Act, 2001 | The whole |
| 19 | 2001 | 38 | The Government of Union Territories and the Government of National Capital Territory of Delhi (Amendment) Act, 2001 | The whole |
| 20 | 2001 | 40 | The Inland Waterways Authority of India (Amendment) Act, 2001 | The whole |
| 21 | 2001 | 46 | The Salary, Allowances and Pension of Members of Parliament (Amendment) Act, 2001 | The whole |
| 22 | 2001 | 54 | The Salary, Allowances and Pension of Members of Parliament (Amendment) Act, 2001 | The whole |
| 23 | 2002 | 14 | The Inter-State Water Disputes (Amendment) Act, 2002 | The whole |
| 24 | 2002 | 29 | The Salaries and Allowances of Officers of Parliament and Leaders of Opposition in Parliament (Amendment) Act, 2002 | The whole |
| 25 | 2002 | 30 | The Sugar Development Fund (Amendment) Act, 2002 | The whole |
| 26 | 2002 | 31 | The Salaries and Allowances of Officers of Parliament (Second Amendment) Act, 2002 | The whole |
| 27 | 2002 | 34 | The Salary, Allowances and Pension of Members of Parliament (Amendment) Act, 2002 | The whole |
| 28 | 2002 | 40 | The General Insurance Business (Nationalisation) Amendment Act, 2002 | The whole |
| 29 | 2002 | 42 | The Insurance (Amendment) Act, 2002 | The whole |
| 30 | 2002 | 51 | The Homoeopathy Central Council (Amendment) Act, 2002 | The whole |
| 31 | 2002 | 52 | The Indian Medicine Central Council (Amendment) Act, 2002 | The whole |
| 32 | 2002 | 55 | The Negotiable Instruments (Amendment and Miscellaneous Provisions) Act, 2002 | The whole |
| 33 | 2002 | 56 | The Salaries and Allowances of Officers of Parliament and Leaders of Opposition in Parliament (Second Amendment) Act, 2002 | The whole |
| 34 | 2002 | 62 | The Consumer Protection (Amendment) Act, 2002 | The whole |
| 35 | 2003 | 7 | The High Court Judges (Salaries and Conditions of Service) Amendment Act, 2002 | The whole |
| 36 | 2003 | 8 | The Supreme Court Judges (Salaries and Conditions of Service) Amendment Act, 2002 | The whole |
| 37 | 2003 | 10 | The Scheduled Castes and Scheduled Tribes Orders (Amendment) Act, 2002 | The whole |
| 38 | 2003 | 11 | The Companies (Second Amendment) Act, 2002 | The whole |
| 39 | 2003 | 35 | The Delhi High Court (Amendment) Act, 2003 | The whole |
| 40 | 2003 | 37 | The Essential Commodities (Amendment) Act, 2003 | The whole |
| 41 | 2003 | 44 | The Sixth Schedule to the Constitution (Amendment) Act, 2003 | The whole |
| 42 | 2003 | 48 | The National Bank for Agriculture and Rural Development (Amendment) Act, 2003 | The whole |
| 43 | 2003 | 51 | The Railways (Second Amendment) Act, 2003 | The whole |
| 44 | 2003 | 58 | The Indian Medicine Central Council (Amendment) Act, 2003 | The whole |
| 45 | 2003 | 59 | The Merchant Shipping (Amendment) Act, 2003 | The whole |
| 46 | 2004 | 4 | The Prevention of Terrorism (Amendment) Act, 2003 | The whole |
| 47 | 2004 | 6 | The Citizenship (Amendment) Act, 2003 | The whole |
| 48 | 2004 | 9 | The Salary, Allowances and Pension of Members of Parliament (Amendment) Act, 2003 | The whole |
| 49 | 2004 | 16 | The Foreigners (Amendment) Act, 2004 | The whole |
| 50 | 2004 | 24 | The Banking Regulation (Amendment) and Miscellaneous Provisions Act, 2004 | The whole |
| 51 | 2004 | 30 | The Enforcement of Security Interest and Recovery of Debts Laws (Amendment) Act, 2004 | The whole |
| 52 | 2005 | 19 | The Government of Union Territories and the Government of National Capital Territory of Delhi (Amendment) Act, 2005 | The whole |
| 53 | 2005 | 32 | The Citizenship (Amendment) Act, 2005 | The whole |
| 54 | 2005 | 40 | The Sree ChitraTirunal Institute for Medical Sciences and Technology, Trivandrum (Amendment) Act, 2005 | The whole |
| 55 | 2005 | 45 | The Warehousing Corporations (Amendment) Act, 2005 | The whole |
| 56 | 2005 | 46 | The High Court and Supreme Court Judges (Salaries and Conditions of Service) Amendment Act, 2005 | The whole |
| 57 | 2006 | 2 | The Criminal Law (Amendment) Act, 2005 | The whole |
| 58 | 2006 | 5 | The Government of Union Territories and the Government of National Capital Territory of Delhi (Amendment) Act, 2006 | The whole |
| 59 | 2006 | 6 | The Contempt of Courts (Amendment) Act, 2006 | The whole |
| 60 | 2006 | 26 | The Reserve Bank of India (Amendment) Act, 2006 | The whole |
| 61 | 2006 | 40 | The Salary, Allowances and Pension of Members of Parliament (Amendment) Act, 2006 | The whole |
| 62 | 2006 | 45 | The Banking Companies (Acquisition and Transfer of Undertakings and Financial Institutions Laws (Amendment) Act, 2006 | The whole |
| 63 | 2006 | 54 | The Essential Commodities (Amendment) Act, 2006 | Sections 2 to 5 |
| 64 | 2007 | 17 | The Banking Regulation (Amendment) Act, 2007 | The whole |
| 65 | 2007 | 18 | The National Tax Tribunal (Amendment) Act, 2007 | The whole |
| 66 | 2007 | 30 | The State Bank of India (Subsidiary Banks Laws) Amendment Act, 2007 | The whole |
| 67 | 2007 | 32 | The State Bank of India (Amendment) Act, 2007 | The whole |
| 68 | 2007 | 35 | The Inland Vessels (Amendment) Act, 2007 | The whole |
| 69 | 2007 | 40 | The Merchant Shipping (Amendment) Act, 2007 | The whole |
| 70 | 2008 | 4 | The Sugar Development Fund (Amendment) Act, 2008 | The whole |
| 71 | 2008 | 30 | The Salaries and Allowances of Officers of Parliament (Amendment) Act, 2008 | The whole |
| 72 | 2009 | 5 | The Code of Criminal Procedure (Amendment) Act, 2008 | The whole |
| 73 | 2009 | 11 | The Supreme Court (Number of Judges) Amendment Act, 2008 | The whole |
| 74 | 2009 | 20 | The Agricultural and Processed Food Products Export Development Authority (Amendment) Act, 2009 | The whole |
| 75 | 2009 | 23 | The High Court and Supreme Court Judges (Salaries and Conditions of Service) Amendment Act, 2009 | The whole |
| 76 | 2009 | 48 | The State Bank of Saurashtra (Repeal) and the State Bank of India (Subsidiary Banks) Amendment Act, 2009 | Sections 3 to 11 |
| 77 | 2010 | 27 | The State Bank of India (Amendment) Act, 2010 | The whole |
| 78 | 2010 | 37 | The Salary, Allowances and Pension of Members of Parliament (Amendment) Act, 2010 | The whole |
| 79 | 2010 | 41 | The Code of Criminal Procedure (Amendment) Act, 2010 | The whole |
| 80 | 2010 | 43 | The Indian Medicine Central Council (Amendment) Act, 2010 | The whole |
| 81 | 2011 | 7 | The State Bank of India (Subsidiary Banks) Amendment Act, 2011 | The whole |
| 82 | 2011 | 17 | The State Bank of India (Subsidiary Banks Laws) Amendment Act, 2011 | The whole |
| 83 | 2012 | 5 | The New Delhi Municipal Council (Amendment) Act, 2011 | The whole |
| 84 | 2012 | 8 | The Life Insurance Corporation (Amendment) Act, 2011 | The whole |
| 85 | 2012 | 11 | The Export-Import Bank of India (Amendment) Act, 2011 | The whole |
| 86 | 2012 | 26 | The North-Eastern Areas (Reorganisation) and Other Related Laws (Amendment) Act, 2012 | The whole |
| 87 | 2012 | 36 | The Chemical Weapons Convention (Amendment) Act, 2012 | The whole |
| 88 | 2013 | 1 | The Enforcement of Security Interest and Recovery of Debts Laws (Amendment) Act, 2012 | The whole |
| 89 | 2013 | 4 | The Banking Laws (Amendment) Act, 2012 | The whole |
| 90 | 2013 | 27 | The Wakf (Amendment) Act, 2013 | The whole |
