= Government of National Capital Territory of Delhi (Amendment) Act, 2023 =

Law that extends the government's control of services

Parliament of India
- Long title: An Act further to amend the Government of National Capital Territory of Delhi Act, 1991.
- Citation: No. 19 of 2023
- Territorial extent: NCT of Delhi
- Passed by: Lok Sabha
- Passed: 3 August 2023
- Passed by: Rajya Sabha
- Passed: 7 August 2023
- Assented to by: President Droupadi Murmu
- Assented to: 11 August 2023
- Commenced: 19 May 2023 (Retrospectively)
- Repealed: 20 December 2025

Legislative history

Initiating chamber: Lok Sabha
- Introduced by: Union Home Minister, Amit Shah
- Introduced: 1 August 2023
- Passed: 3 August 2023
- Voting summary: (Voice Vote) Majority voted for

Revising chamber: Rajya Sabha
- Passed: 7 August 2023
- Voting summary: 131 voted for; 102 voted against; None abstained

Amends
- Government of National Capital Territory of Delhi Act, 1991

Repeals
- Government of National Capital Territory of Delhi (Amendment) Ordinance, 2023 (Ord. 1 of 2023)

Repealed by
- Repealing and Amending Act, 2025 (37 of 2025)

Supreme Court of India cases
- Government of NCT of Delhi v. Union of India

Summary
- Establishes the National Capital Civil Services Authority, and thereby giving lieutenant governor the final say in all matters related to transfer and posting of civil servants in Delhi.

Keywords
- National Capital Civil Services Authority (NCCSA), Delhi Ordinance, NCTD Act, Delhi Services Act
- Status: Repealed

The Government of National Capital Territory of Delhi (Amendment) Act, 2023 also commonly known as Delhi Services Act, was an amendment that extends the Central Government's control of services and gives powers to the Lieutenant Governor of Delhi over the capital city's elected Government.

== Sequence of Events ==
- 11 May 2023 A 5 judge Constitutional Bench of the Supreme Court ruled on the issue of who controls the bureaucracy in the national capital. The bench, headed by Chief Justice of India DY Chandrachud, held that the legislature (Elected Government) has control over bureaucrats in administration of services and control over officers' transfer and posting except in matters of public order, police and land.
- 19 May 2023 The Central Government responded by bringing an Ordinance on the issue which overturned the Supreme Court decision. The Government claimed that Delhi Government led by Arvind Kejriwal was hiding files and harassing officers related to vigilance matters.
- 3 August 2023 The Lok Sabha passed the bill by voice vote as BJP had a clear majority.
- 8 August 2023 The Rajya Sabha passed the bill by division voting, with 131 Ayes and 102 Noes.
- 11 August 2023 The Act became law (with retrospective application), when President Droupadi Murmu gave assent to the bill.

== National Capital Civil Services Authority ==
It is an administrative authority that will manage the Civil Services in Delhi. The authority will have 3 members- Chief Minister of Delhi, the Chief Secretary and the Principal Home Secretary. The meetings of this authority will be chaired by Chief Minister of Delhi. The decisions are taken by vote.

NCCSA gives the union government more power to take decisions regarding the tenure, salaries, allowances, powers, and duties of officers.

=== Role of CM in NCCSA ===
CM will chair the meetings of NCCSA and decide the meeting's day and date. He will be presiding over discussions in NCCSA.

=== Role of LG in NCCSA ===
LG will have final decision making authority. He can return files to NCCSA for reconsideration or can also take independent decisions for transfer and posting.
