= Minister of Law and Justice =

Cabinet position in the government of India

- विधि और न्याय मंत्री Vidhi Aur Nyāya Mantrī
- Emblem of the Ministry of Law and Justice

- Flag of the Republic of India

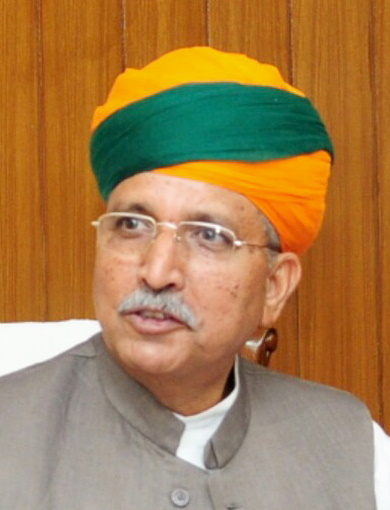
- Incumbent; Arjun Ram Meghwal, Minister of State (Independent Charge) since 18 May 2023
- Ministry of Law and Justice
- Member of: Cabinet of India
- Reports to: President of India; Prime Minister of India; Parliament of India
- Appointer: President of India on the recommendation of the Prime Minister of India
- Formation: 15 August 1947
- First holder: B. R. Ambedkar
- Deputy: Minister of State for Law and Justice

The minister of law and justice is the head of the Ministry of Law and Justice and one of the cabinet ministers of the Government of India. The first law and justice minister of independent India was B. R. Ambedkar, who served in first Nehru ministry during 1947–52. On 18 May 2023, Arjun Ram Meghwal replaced Kiren Rijiju and became the minister of state (independent charge) of Ministry of Law and Justice.

== Titles ==
Ever since the ministry's creation in 1947, the ministry had undergone several changes and adopted various name. The present form of "Ministry of Law and Justice" was adopted in July 2002 after the Department of Company Affairs of the erstwhile Ministry of Law, Justice and Company Affairs was separated and made an independent ministry which was later known as the Ministry of Corporate Affairs.

- 15 August 1947 – 18 March 1971: Minister of Law
- 18 March 1971 – 5 February 1973: Minister of Law and Justice
- 5 February 1973 – 31 October 1984: Minister of Law, Justice and Company Affairs
- 4 November 1984 – 21 June 1991: Minister of Law and Justice
- 21 June 1991 – 1 July 2002: Minister of Law, Justice and Company Affairs
- 1 July 2002 – present: Minister of Law and Justice

== Cabinet ministers ==
- Note: MoS, I/C – Minister of State (Independent Charge)

No.	Portrait	Minister (Birth-Death) Constituency	Term of office			Political party	Ministry	Prime Minister
No.	Portrait	Minister (Birth-Death) Constituency	From	To	Period	Political party	Ministry	Prime Minister
Minister of Law
1		B. R. Ambedkar (1891–1956); MP for Bombay	15 August 1947	11 October 1951	4 years, 57 days	Scheduled Castes Federation	Nehru I	Jawaharlal Nehru
2		Kailash Nath Katju (1887–1968); MP for United Provinces	5 November 1951	13 May 1952	190 days	Indian National Congress	Nehru I	Jawaharlal Nehru
3		Charu Chandra Biswas (1888–1960); Rajya Sabha MP for West Bengal	13 May 1952	17 April 1957	4 years, 339 days	Indian National Congress	Nehru II	Jawaharlal Nehru
4		Ashoke Kumar Sen (1913–1996); MP for Calcutta North West (MoS until 12 May 1958)	18 April 1957	24 January 1966	8 years, 281 days	Indian National Congress	Nehru III	Jawaharlal Nehru
4		Ashoke Kumar Sen (1913–1996); MP for Calcutta North West (MoS until 12 May 1958)	18 April 1957	24 January 1966	8 years, 281 days	Indian National Congress	Nehru IV	Jawaharlal Nehru
4		Ashoke Kumar Sen (1913–1996); MP for Calcutta North West (MoS until 12 May 1958)	18 April 1957	24 January 1966	8 years, 281 days	Indian National Congress	Nanda I	Gulzarilal Nanda
4		Ashoke Kumar Sen (1913–1996); MP for Calcutta North West (MoS until 12 May 1958)	18 April 1957	24 January 1966	8 years, 281 days	Indian National Congress	Shastri	Lal Bahadur Shastri
4		Ashoke Kumar Sen (1913–1996); MP for Calcutta North West (MoS until 12 May 1958)	18 April 1957	24 January 1966	8 years, 281 days	Indian National Congress	Nanda II	Gulzarilal Nanda
5		Gopal Swarup Pathak (1896–1982); Rajya Sabha MP for Uttar Pradesh	24 January 1966	13 March 1967	1 year, 48 days	Indian National Congress	Indira I	Indira Gandhi
6		Panampilly Govinda Menon (1906–1970); MP for Mukundapuram	13 March 1967	23 May 1970	3 years, 71 days	Indian National Congress	Indira II	Indira Gandhi
7		Kengal Hanumanthaiah (1908–1980); MP for Bangalore City	26 June 1970	18 March 1971	265 days	Indian National Congress	Indira II	Indira Gandhi
Minister of Law and Justice						Indian National Congress		
8		H. R. Gokhale (1915–1978); MP for Mumbai North West	18 March 1971	5 February 1973	1 year, 324 days	Indian National Congress (R)	Indira III	Indira Gandhi
Minister of Law, Justice and Company Affairs
(8)		H. R. Gokhale (1915–1978); MP for Mumbai North West	5 February 1973	24 March 1977	4 years, 47 days	Indian National Congress (R)	Indira III	Indira Gandhi
9		Shanti Bhushan (1925–2023); Rajya Sabha MP for Uttar Pradesh	26 March 1977	28 July 1979	2 years, 124 days	Janata Party	Desai	Morarji Desai
10		Justice (Retd.); Hans Raj Khanna (1912–2008); Unelected	30 July 1979	3 August 1979	4 days	Janata Party (Secular)	Charan	Charan Singh
11		Shyam Nath Kacker (born unknown); Unelected	3 August 1979	14 January 1980	164 days	Janata Party (Secular)	Charan	Charan Singh
12		P. Shiv Shankar (1929–2017); MP for Secunderabad	14 January 1980	15 January 1982	2 years, 1 day	Indian National Congress (I)	Indira IV	Indira Gandhi
13		Jagannath Kaushal (1915–2001); MP for Chandigarh	15 January 1982	31 October 1984	2 years, 290 days	Indian National Congress (I)	Indira IV	Indira Gandhi
Minister of Law and Justice
(13)		Jagannath Kaushal (1915–2001); MP for Chandigarh	4 November 1984	31 December 1984	57 days	Indian National Congress (I)	Rajiv I	Rajiv Gandhi
(4)		Ashoke Kumar Sen (1913–1996); MP for Calcutta North West	31 December 1984	31 March 1987	2 years, 90 days	Indian National Congress (I)	Rajiv II	Rajiv Gandhi
(12)		P. Shiv Shankar (1929–2017); Rajya Sabha MP for Gujarat	25 July 1987	14 February 1988	204 days	Indian National Congress (I)	Rajiv II	Rajiv Gandhi
14		Bindeshwari Dubey (1921–1993); Rajya Sabha MP for Bihar	14 February 1988	26 June 1988	133 days	Indian National Congress (I)	Rajiv II	Rajiv Gandhi
15		B. Shankaranand (1925–2009); MP for Chikkodi	26 June 1988	2 December 1989	1 year, 160 days	Indian National Congress (I)	Rajiv II	Rajiv Gandhi
16		Dinesh Goswami (1935–1991); Rajya Sabha MP for Assam	6 December 1989	10 November 1990	339 days	Asom Gana Parishad	Vishwanath	Vishwanath Pratap Singh
17		Subramanian Swamy (born 1939); Rajya Sabha MP for Uttar Pradesh	21 November 1990	21 June 1991	212 days	Janata Party	Chandra Shekhar	Chandra Shekhar
Minister of Law, Justice and Company Affairs
18		Kotla Vijaya Bhaskara Reddy (1920–2001); MP for Kurnool	21 June 1991	9 October 1992	1 year, 110 days	Indian National Congress (I)	Rao	P. V. Narasimha Rao
–		P. V. Narasimha Rao (1921–2004); MP for Nandyal (Prime Minister)	9 October 1992	16 May 1996	3 years, 220 days	Indian National Congress (I)	Rao	P. V. Narasimha Rao
19		Ram Jethmalani (1923–2019); Rajya Sabha MP for Maharashtra	16 May 1996	1 June 1996	16 days	Independent	Vajpayee I	Atal Bihari Vajpayee
20		P. Chidambaram (born 1945); MP for Sivaganga	1 June 1996	29 June 1996	28 days	Tamil Maanila Congress	Deve Gowda	H. D. Deve Gowda
21		Ramakant Khalap (born 1946); MP for Panaji (MoS, I/C)	29 June 1996	19 March 1998	1 year, 263 days	Maharashtrawadi Gomantak Party	Deve Gowda	H. D. Deve Gowda
21		Ramakant Khalap (born 1946); MP for Panaji (MoS, I/C)	29 June 1996	19 March 1998	1 year, 263 days	Maharashtrawadi Gomantak Party	Gujral	Inder Kumar Gujral
22		M. Thambidurai (born 1947); MP for Karur	19 March 1998	8 April 1999	1 year, 20 days.	All India Anna Dravida Munnetra Kazhagam	Vajpayee II	Atal Bihari Vajpayee
23		Rangarajan Kumaramangalam (1952–2000); MP for Tiruchirappalli	9 April 1999	8 June 1999	60 days	Bharatiya Janata Party	Vajpayee II	Atal Bihari Vajpayee
(19)		Ram Jethmalani (1923–2019); Rajya Sabha MP for Maharashtra	8 June 1999	23 July 2000	1 year, 45 days	Independent	Vajpayee II	Atal Bihari Vajpayee
(19)		Ram Jethmalani (1923–2019); Rajya Sabha MP for Maharashtra	8 June 1999	23 July 2000	1 year, 45 days	Independent	Vajpayee III	Atal Bihari Vajpayee
24		Arun Jaitley (1952–2019); Rajya Sabha MP for Uttar Pradesh (MoS, I/C until 7 November 2000)	24 July 2000	1 July 2002	1 year, 342 days	Bharatiya Janata Party	Vajpayee III	Atal Bihari Vajpayee
Minister of Law and Justice
25		Jana Krishnamurthi (1928–2007); Rajya Sabha MP for Gujarat	1 July 2002	29 January 2003	212 days	Bharatiya Janata Party	Vajpayee III	Atal Bihari Vajpayee
(24)		Arun Jaitley (1952–2019); Rajya Sabha MP for Uttar Pradesh	29 January 2003	22 May 2004	1 year, 114 days	Bharatiya Janata Party	Vajpayee III	Atal Bihari Vajpayee
26		H. R. Bhardwaj (1939–2020); Rajya Sabha MP for Madhya Pradesh, until 2006; Rajya Sabha MP for Haryana, from 2006	23 May 2004	22 May 2009	4 years, 364 days	Indian National Congress	Manmohan I	Manmohan Singh
27		Veerappa Moily (born 1940); MP for Chikballapur	28 May 2009	12 July 2011	2 years, 45 days	Indian National Congress	Manmohan II	Manmohan Singh
28		Salman Khurshid (born 1953); MP for Farrukhabad	12 July 2011	28 October 2012	1 year, 108 days	Indian National Congress	Manmohan II	Manmohan Singh
29		Ashwani Kumar (born 1952); Rajya Sabha MP for Punjab	28 October 2012	11 May 2013	348 days	Indian National Congress	Manmohan II	Manmohan Singh
30		Kapil Sibal (born 1948); MP for Chandni Chowk	11 May 2013	26 May 2014	1 year, 15 days	Indian National Congress	Manmohan II	Manmohan Singh
31		Ravi Shankar Prasad (born 1954); Rajya Sabha MP for Bihar	27 May 2014	9 November 2014	167 days	Bharatiya Janata Party	Modi I	Narendra Modi
32		D. V. Sadananda Gowda (born 1953); MP for Bangalore North	9 November 2014	5 July 2016	1 year, 239 days	Bharatiya Janata Party	Modi I	Narendra Modi
(31)		Ravi Shankar Prasad (born 1954); Rajya Sabha MP for Bihar, till 2019; MP for Patna Sahib, from 2019	5 July 2016	7 July 2021	5 years, 2 days	Bharatiya Janata Party	Modi I	Narendra Modi
(31)		Ravi Shankar Prasad (born 1954); Rajya Sabha MP for Bihar, till 2019; MP for Patna Sahib, from 2019	5 July 2016	7 July 2021	5 years, 2 days	Bharatiya Janata Party	Modi II	Narendra Modi
33		Kiren Rijiju (born 1971); MP for Arunachal West	7 July 2021	18 May 2023	1 year, 315 days	Bharatiya Janata Party	Modi II	Narendra Modi
34		Arjun Ram Meghwal (born 1953); MP for Bikaner (MoS, I/C)	18 May 2023	Incumbent	3 years, 113 days	Bharatiya Janata Party	Modi II	Narendra Modi
34		Arjun Ram Meghwal (born 1953); MP for Bikaner (MoS, I/C)	18 May 2023	Incumbent	3 years, 113 days	Bharatiya Janata Party	Modi III	Narendra Modi

== Ministers of state ==
No.	Portrait	Minister (Birth-Death) Constituency	Term of office			Political party	Ministry	Prime Minister
No.	Portrait	Minister (Birth-Death) Constituency	From	To	Period	Political party	Ministry	Prime Minister
Minister of State for Law
1		Hari Vinayak Pataskar (1892–1970); MP for Jalgaon (Minister of Legal Affairs, from 23 August 1955)	7 December 1954	16 April 1957	2 years, 130 days	Indian National Congress	Nehru II	Jawaharlal Nehru
2		Ramchandra Martand Hajarnavis (1908–1976); MP for Bhandara	29 October 1965	11 January 1966	74 days	Indian National Congress	Shastri	Lal Bahadur Shastri
3		C. R. Pattabhiraman (1906–2001); MP for Kumbakonam	24 January 1966	13 March 1967	1 year, 48 days	Indian National Congress	Indira I	Indira Gandhi
4		Kotha Raghuramaiah (1912–1979); MP for Guntur	13 March 1967	18 March 1967	5 days	Indian National Congress	Indira II	Indira Gandhi
5		Phulrenu Guha (1912–2006); Rajya Sabha MP for West Bengal	14 February 1969	26 June 1970	1 year, 132 days	Indian National Congress (R)	Indira II	Indira Gandhi
6		Jagannath Rao (1909–?); MP for Chatrapur	27 June 1970	18 March 1971	264 days	Indian National Congress (R)	Indira II	Indira Gandhi
Minister of State for Law and Justice
7		Nitiraj Singh Chaudhary (1909–1988); MP for Narmadapuram	18 March 1971	5 February 1973	1 year, 324 days	Indian National Congress (R)	Indira III	Indira Gandhi
Minister of State for Law, Justice and Company Affairs
(7)		Nitiraj Singh Chaudhary (1909–1988); MP for Narmadapuram	5 February 1973	17 October 1974	1 year, 254 days	Indian National Congress (R)	Indira III	Indira Gandhi
8		Dajisaheb Chavan (1916–1973); MP for Karad	5 February 1973	8 July 1973 (died in office)	153 days	Indian National Congress (R)	Indira III	Indira Gandhi
9		Sarojini Mahishi (1927–2015); MP for Dharwad North	10 October 1974	3 January 1976	1 year, 85 days	Indian National Congress (R)	Indira III	Indira Gandhi
10		V. A. Seyid Muhammad; Rajya Sabha MP for Kerala	25 December 1975	24 March 1977	1 year, 89 days	Indian National Congress (R)	Indira III	Indira Gandhi
11		Narsingh Yadav; MP for Chandauli	14 August 1977	11 July 1978	331 days	Janata Party	Desai	Morarji Desai
12		S. D. Patil; MP for Erandol	20 February 1979	28 July 1979	158 days	Janata Party	Desai	Morarji Desai
13		A. A. Rahim (1920–1995); MP for Chirayinkil	15 January 1982	2 September 1982	230 days	Indian National Congress (I)	Indira IV	Indira Gandhi
Minister of State for Law and Justice
14		H. R. Bhardwaj (1939–2020); Rajya Sabha MP for Madhya Pradesh	31 December 1984	2 December 1989	4 years, 336 days	Indian National Congress (I)	Rajiv II	Rajiv Gandhi
Minister of State for Law, Justice and Company Affairs
15		Rangarajan Kumaramangalam (1952–2000); MP for Salem	21 June 1991	2 September 1992	1 year, 73 days	Indian National Congress (I)	Rao	P. V. Narasimha Rao
(14)		H. R. Bhardwaj (1939–2020); Rajya Sabha MP for Madhya Pradesh	2 September 1992	16 May 1996	3 years, 257 days	Indian National Congress (I)	Rao	P. V. Narasimha Rao
16		O. Rajagopal (born 1929); Rajya Sabha MP for Madhya Pradesh	13 October 1999	24 July 2000	285 days	Bharatiya Janata Party	Vajpayee III	Atal Bihari Vajpayee
Minister of State for Law and Justice
17		Ravi Shankar Prasad (born 1954); Rajya Sabha MP for Bihar	1 July 2002	29 January 2003	212 days	Bharatiya Janata Party	Vajpayee III	Atal Bihari Vajpayee
18		P. C. Thomas (born 1950); MP for Muvattupuzha	24 May 2003	22 May 2004	364 days	Kerala Congress	Vajpayee III	Atal Bihari Vajpayee
19		K. Venkatapathy (born 1946); MP for Cuddalore	23 May 2004	22 May 2009	4 years, 364 days	Dravida Munnetra Kazhagam	Manmohan I	Manmohan Singh
20		P. P. Chaudhary (born 1953); MP for Pali	5 July 2016	30 May 2019	2 years, 329 days	Bharatiya Janata Party	Modi I	Narendra Modi
21		S. P. Singh Baghel (born 1960); MP for Agra	7 July 2021	18 May 2023	1 year, 315 days	Bharatiya Janata Party	Modi II	Narendra Modi

== Length of Tenure ==
=== Cabinet Ministers ===
#	Name of Minister	Party	Terms	Length of term	
#	Name of Minister	Party	Terms	Longest tenure	Total tenure
1	Ashoke Kumar Sen	INC	6	4 years, 357 days	11 years, 6 days
2	H. R. Gokhale	INC(R)	2	4 years, 47 days	6 years, 6 days
3	Ravi Shankar Prasad	BJP	3	2 years, 329 days	5 years, 167 days
4	H. R. Bhardwaj	INC	1	4 years, 364 days	4 years, 364 days
5	Charu Chandra Biswas	INC	1	4 years, 339 days	4 years, 339 days
6	B. R. Ambedkar	SCF	1	4 years, 57 days	4 years, 57 days
7	P. V. Narasimha Rao	INC(I)	1	3 years, 219 days	3 years, 219 days
8	Arjun Ram Meghwal	BJP	2	1 years, 324 days	3 years, 113 days
9	Arun Jaitley	BJP	2	1 years, 342 days	3 years, 90 days
10	Panampilly Govinda Menon	INC	1	3 years, 71 days	3 years, 71 days
11	Jagannath Kaushal	INC(I)	2	2 years, 289 days	2 years, 346 days
12	P. Shiv Shankar	INC(I)	2	2 years, 1 day	2 years, 205 days
13	Shanti Bhushan	JP	1	2 years, 124 days	2 years, 124 days
14	Veerappa Moily	INC	1	2 years, 45 days	2 years, 45 days
15	Kiren Rijiju	BJP	1	1 years, 315 days	1 years, 315 days
16	Ramakant Khalap	MGP	2	0 years, 332 days	1 year, 263 days
17	D. V. Sadananda Gowda	BJP	1	1 years, 238 days	1 years, 238 days
18	B. Shankaranand	INC	1	1 years, 160 days	1 years, 160 days
19	Kotla Vijaya Bhaskara Reddy	INC(I)	1	1 years, 110 days	1 years, 110 days
20	Salman Khurshid	INC	1	1 years, 108 days	1 years, 108 days
21	Ram Jethmalani	IND	3	0 years, 284 days	1 year, 62 days
22	Gopal Swarup Pathak	INC	1	1 years, 48 days	1 years, 48 days
23	M. Thambidurai	AIADMK	1	1 years, 20 days	1 years, 20 days
24	Kapil Sibal	INC	1	1 years, 15 days	1 years, 15 days
25	Dinesh Goswami	AGP	1	0 years, 339 days	0 years, 339 days
26	Kengal Hanumanthaiah	INC	1	0 years, 265 days	0 years, 265 days
27	Subramanian Swamy	JP	1	0 years, 212 days	0 years, 212 days
28	Jana Krishnamurthi	BJP	1	0 years, 212 days	0 years, 212 days
29	Ashwani Kumar	INC	1	0 years, 195 days	0 years, 195 days
30	Kailash Nath Katju	INC	1	0 years, 190 days	0 years, 190 days
31	Shyam Nath Kacker	JP(S)	1	0 years, 164 days	0 years, 164 days
32	Bindeshwari Dubey	INC(I)	1	0 years, 133 days	0 years, 133 days
33	Rangarajan Kumaramangalam	BJP	1	0 years, 60 days	0 years, 60 days
34	P. Chidambaram	TMC(M)	1	0 years, 28 days	0 years, 28 days
35	Hans Raj Khanna	JP(S)	1	0 years, 4 days	0 years, 4 days
