= List of Indian state days =

Foundation (or statehood) Day of Indian States

The Union of India is a federal union made up of 28 states and 8 union territories. India achieved independence from British Raj on 15 August 1947 and became a republic on 26 January 1950. Many states celebrate a state day to mark its formation, statehood, reorganisation or other associated events while some like Assam and Bengal celebrate it on other specific days. Some of the states and union territories have declared official holidays. State functions, parades, cultural events and award ceremonies are generally organized. Many states celebrate their state day on their formation date or statehood date.

== List ==
=== States ===
State	Day	Date	Significance	Timeline	Ref.
Andhra Pradesh	Andhra Pradesh Day	1 November	Reorganisation (1956)	1953 – State of Andhra separated from the State of Madras by Andhra State Act, 1953; 1956 – Merged with State of Hyderabad to form the State of Andhra Pradesh by States Reorganisation Act, 1956	
Arunachal Pradesh	Arunachal Pradesh Day	20 February	Statehood (1987)	1914 – Established North-East Frontier Tracts (NEFT), a division in Assam Province; 1954 – Reorganised as North-East Frontier Agency, an administration division in Undivided Assam; 1972 – Created as a union territory from Assam by North-Eastern Areas (Reorganisation) Act, 1971; 1987 – Converted to a state by State of Arunachal Pradesh Act, 1986	
Assam	Assam Day	2 December	Establishment of Ahom kingdom (1228) Technically Statehood (1950)	1874 – Divided from Bengal Presidency to form North-East Frontier Province; 1905 – Merged into Eastern Bengal and Assam; 1912 – Re-established as Province of Assam; 1950 – Achieved statehood as State of Assam	
Bihar	Bihar Day	22 March	Formation (1912)	1912 – Founded as Province of Bihar and Orissa; 1936 – Divided to form Province of Bihar by Government of India Act 1935; 1950 – Achieved statehood as State of Bihar	
Chhattisgarh	Chhattisgarh Rajyotsava	1 November	Formation (2000)	2000 – Divided from Madhya Pradesh by Madhya Pradesh Reorganisation Act, 2000	
Goa	Goa Liberation Day	19 December	Liberation (1961)	1961 – Annexed to India after Portuguese-Indian War as a part of Union Territory of Goa, Daman and Diu; 1987 – Made a State by State of Goa Act, 1986	
Goa	Goa Day	30 May	Statehood (1987)	1961 – Annexed to India after Portuguese-Indian War as a part of Union Territory of Goa, Daman and Diu; 1987 – Made a State by State of Goa Act, 1986	
Gujarat	Gujarat Day	1 May	Formation (1960)	1924 – Organised as States of Western India Agency; 1944 – Reorganised as Baroda, Western India and Gujarat States Agency; 1948 – Organized as State of Saurashtra and United State of Kathiawar; 1956 – Merged with State of Bombay per States Reorganisation Act, 1956; 1960 – State of Bombay bifurcated to form State of Gujarat	
Haryana	Haryana Day	1 November	Formation (1966)	1966 – Carved out from the State of Punjab by Punjab Reorganisation Act, 1966	
Himachal Pradesh	Himachal Pradesh Day	25 January	Formation (1971)	1948 – Organized as Chief Commissioner's Province of Himachal Pradesh; 1956 – Organized as a union territory by States Reorganisation Act, 1956; 1971 – Achieved statehood by State of Himachal Pradesh Act, 1970	
Jharkhand	Jharkhand Day	15 November	Formation (2000)	2000 – Divided from Bihar by Bihar Reorganisation Act, 2000	
Karnataka	Karnataka Rajyotsava	1 November	Reorganisation (1956)	Originally the Kingdom of Mysore in the Indian Empire; 1948 – Admitted as State of Mysore in the Indian Union; 1956 – Southern Kannada-speaking parts of Bombay State added to Mysore State per States Reorganisation Act, 1956; 1973 – Renamed as State of Karnataka	
Kerala	Kerala Day	1 November	Formation (1956)	1949 – Organized as Travancore-Cochin State from former Kingdom of Cochin and Kingdom of Travancore in the Indian Empire; 1956 – Merged with parts of Madras State to form State of Kerala by States Reorganisation Act, 1956	
Madhya Pradesh	Madhya Pradesh Day	1 November	Formation (1956)	1956 – Created by merging Madhya Bharat, Vindhya Pradesh, Central Provinces and Berar and Bhopal State by States Reorganisation Act, 1956	
Maharashtra	Maharashtra Day	1 May	Formation (1960)	1960 – Bifurcation of State of Bombay to form State of Maharashtra by Bombay Reorganisation Act, 1960	
Manipur	Manipur Day	21 January	Statehood (1972)	1949 – Manipur acceded to the Indian Union; 1950 – Became a part C state by Constitution of India; 1956 – Organized as a union territory by States Reorganisation Act, 1956; 1972 – Achieved statehood by State of Manipur Act, 1971	
Meghalaya	Meghalaya Day	21 January	Statehood (1972)	1970 – Established as an autonomous state in Assam by Assam Reorganisation (Meghalaya) Act; 1972 – Achieved statehood by North-Eastern Areas (Reorganisation) Act, 1971	
Mizoram	Mizoram Day	20 February	Statehood (1987)	1972 – Founded as a union territory by North-Eastern Areas (Reorganisation) Act, 1971; 1987 – Established as Mizoram state by State of Mizoram Act, 1986	
Nagaland	Nagaland Day	1 December	Formation (1963)	1963 – Statehood given by State of Nagaland Act, 1962	
Odisha	Odisha Day	1 April 1936	Formation (1936)	1912 – Founded as Province of Bihar and Orissa; 1936 – Divided to form Province of Orissa by Government of India Act 1935; 2011 – Renamed as Odisha by Orissa (Alteration of Name) Act, 2011	
Punjab	Punjab Day	1 November	Reorganisation (1966)	1947 – Founded as East Punjab Province from Undivided Punjab Province; 1950 – Renamed as Punjab State; 1966 – Reorganised by Punjab Reorganisation Act, 1966	
Rajasthan	Rajasthan Day	30 March	Formation (1949)	1949 – Founded as United State of Rajasthan from erstwhile Matsya and Rajasthan; 1950 – Renamed as Rajasthan; 1956 – Reorganized by States Reorganisation Act, 1956	
Sikkim	Sikkim Day	16 May	Formation (1975)	Originally the Kingdom of Sikkim in the Indian Empire; 1975 – Accession and establishment by the 35th amendment to the Constitution of India	
Tamil Nadu	Tamil Nadu Day	18 July	Renaming of Madras to Tamil Nadu (1969)	1950 – Province of Madras renamed as State of Madras; 1953 – Divided by Andhra State Act, 1953; 1956 – Reorganized by States Reorganisation Act, 1956; 1969 – Renamed as Tamil Nadu by Madras State (Alteration of name) Act, 1968	
Telangana	Telangana Day	2 June	Formation (2014)	2014 – Divided from Andhra Pradesh by Andhra Pradesh Reorganisation Act, 2014	
Tripura	Tripura Day	21 January	Statehood (1972)	1949 – Tripura acceded to the Indian Union by Tripura Merger Agreement; 1950 – Became a part C state by Constitution of India; 1956 – Organized as a union territory by States Reorganisation Act, 1956; 1972 – Achieved statehood by North-Eastern Areas (Reorganisation) Act, 1971	
Uttar Pradesh	Uttar Pradesh Day	1 November	Statehood and renaming United Provinces to Uttar Pradesh (1950)	1902 – Founded as United Provinces of Agra and Oudh from North-Western Provinces; 1936 – Renamed as United Province by Government of India Act 1935; 1950 – Reorganized as state of Uttar Pradesh with addition of parts of Delhi Territory	
Uttarakhand	Uttarakhand Day	9 November	Formation (2000)	2000 – Divided from Uttar Pradesh by Uttar Pradesh Reorganisation Act, 2000	
West Bengal	West Bengal Day	20 June	Technical Statehood Day (1947)	1947 – Province of Bengal divided to form Province of West Bengal	

=== Union territories ===
Union Territory	Day	Date	Significance	Timeline	Ref.
Andaman and Nicobar Islands	Andaman and Nicobar Day	1 November	Union Territory (1956)	1950 – A Part D state; 1956 – Established as union territory by the States Reorganisation Act, 1956	
Chandigarh	Chandigarh Day	1 November	Formation (1966)	1953 – Established as capital of East Punjab; 1966 – Reorganized as union territory Punjab Reorganisation Act, 1966	
Dadra and Nagar Haveli and Daman and Diu	Dadra and Nagar Haveli and Daman and Diu Day	26 January	Formation (2020)	1961 – Annexed to India after Indo-Portuguese War as a part of Union Territory of Goa, Daman and Diu; 1987 – Reorganized as union territories of Dadra and Nagar Haveli and Daman and Diu by State of Goa Act, 1986; 2020 – Reorganized by merging by Dadra and Nagar Haveli and Daman and Diu (Merger of Union Territories) Act, 2019	
Delhi	Delhi Day	1 November	Union Territory (1956)	1911 – Established as the Chief Commissioner's Province of Delhi and Capital of India; 1956 – Reorganized as union territory by States Reorganisation Act, 1956	
Jammu and Kashmir	Jammu and Kashmir Day	16 March	Formation (1846)	1846 – Treaty of Amritsar establishes the state, under the British Indian paramountcy; 1947 – Accession to Independent India; 2019 – Reorganized as union territory by Jammu and Kashmir Reorganisation Act, 2019	
Jammu and Kashmir	Jammu and Kashmir Accession Day	26 October	Accession (1947)	1846 – Treaty of Amritsar establishes the state, under the British Indian paramountcy; 1947 – Accession to Independent India; 2019 – Reorganized as union territory by Jammu and Kashmir Reorganisation Act, 2019	
Jammu and Kashmir	-	31 October	Union Territory (2019)	1846 – Treaty of Amritsar establishes the state, under the British Indian paramountcy; 1947 – Accession to Independent India; 2019 – Reorganized as union territory by Jammu and Kashmir Reorganisation Act, 2019	
Ladakh	Ladakh Day	31 October	Formation (2019)	*2019 – Formed as union territory by Jammu and Kashmir Reorganisation Act, 2019	
Lakshadweep	Lakshadweep Day	1 November	Formation (1956)	1956 – Split from Madras state to create union territory by States Reorganisation Act, 1956	
Puducherry	Puducherry Liberation Day	1 November	De Facto (unofficial) transfer (1954)	1954 – De facto cession of French establishments of India; 1962 – De jure transfer to India; 1963 – Organized as union territory	
Puducherry	De Jure Transfer Day	16 August	De Jure (official) transfer (1962)	1954 – De facto cession of French establishments of India; 1962 – De jure transfer to India; 1963 – Organized as union territory	

== See also ==
- List of Indian state symbols
