= Public holidays in India =

Public Holidays in India, also known as Government Holidays, consist of a variety of cultural, nationalistic, and religious holidays that are legislated in India at the union or state levels.

Being a culturally diverse country, there are many festivals celebrated in various regions across the country. There are only three national holidays declared by the Government of India: Republic Day (26 January), Independence Day (15 August) and Gandhi Jayanti (2 October). Apart from this, certain holidays which are celebrated nationally are declared centrally by the Union Government. Additionally, various state governments and union territories designate additional holidays on local festivals or days of importance as holidays as per section 25 of the Negotiable Instruments Act, 1881.

== National holidays ==
National holidays are mandatory holidays declared by the Government of India which is applicable for all states and union territories of India.

Date	Name	Type	Details
26 January	Republic Day	Fixed (Indian Constitution came into force)	Celebrates the 1950 adoption of the Constitution of India
15 August	Independence Day	Fixed (India Independence from the United Kingdom)	Celebrates the 1947 Independence from the British rule
2 October	Gandhi Jayanti	Fixed (India; birth anniversary of Mahatma Gandhi)	Honors Mahatma Gandhi, who was born on 2 October 1869

== Central holidays ==
In addition to the three fixed national holidays, the Union Government of India declares additional days as holidays which are largely followed by central government offices and affiliates. In addition to designated fixed holidays, few other days are designated optional from which select number of days can be chosen according to individual convenience.

=== Fixed ===
Date	Name	Type	Details
25 December	Christmas Day	Fixed	Christian festival that celebrates the birth of Jesus Christ, central figure of Christianity (c. 6 to 4BC–30 or 33AD) whose birth is commemorated on 25 December
12 Rabi' al-awwal	Mawlid	Fixed	Muslim festival that celebrates the birth of Muhammad. It is celebrated in Rabi' al-Awwal, the third month in the Islamic calendar.
1 Shawwal	Eid al-Fitr	Fixed	Muslim festival that celebrates of the day of breaking the fast. It is celebrated on the first day of Shawwal in the Islamic calendar.
10 Muharram	Ashura	Fixed	Muslims mourn the martydom of Husayn Ibn Ali, prophet Muhammad's family. Also marks parting of the Red Sea by Moses, salvation of the Israelites, Noah's disembarkment from the Ark.
10 Dhu al-Hijjah	Eid al-Adha	Fixed	Muslim festival that honours the willingness of Abraham to sacrifice his son, either Isaac or Ismail, as an act of obedience to God.
March–April	Mahavir Janma Kalyanak	Floating	Jain festival that celebrates the birth of Mahavira (599 BC), the twenty-fourth and last Tirthankara (supreme preacher) of present Avasarpiṇī
March–May	Good Friday	Floating	Christian festival that commemorates the crucifixion of Jesus
April–June	Buddha's Birthday	Floating	Buddhist festival that celebrates Gautama Buddha, founder of Buddhism (c. 563–483 BC). It is celebrated on the full moon day of the Vaisakha month of the Buddhist calendar.
September–October	Vijayadashami	Floating	Hindu festival that celebrates the victory of good over evil. It is celebrated on the tenth day of Ashvin, the seventh month in the Hindu Calendar Sikh festival called Dasehara.
October–November	Diwali	Floating	Hindu festival of lights. It is celebrated on the new moon day in the month of Ashvin or Kartika in the Hindu Calendar Sikh festival to celebrate Bandi Chhor Divas in remembrance of the release of Guru Hargobind from the Gwalior Fort prison by the Mughal emperor Jahangir and the day he arrived at the Golden Temple in Amritsar.
October–November	Guru Nanak's Birthday	Floating	Sikh festival that celebrates the birth of the first Sikh guru, (1469).

=== Optional ===
Date	Name	Type	Details
January	Makar Sankranti / Pongal	Floating	Hindu festival marking the transition of the sun from Sagittarius to Capricorn and dedicated to the solar deity Surya.
January–February	Vasant Panchami	Floating	Hindu festival dedicated to Goddess Saraswati, that marks the preparation for the arrival of spring and celebrated on the fifth day of Magha, the eleventh month of Hindu calendar
February–March	Maha Shivaratri	Floating	Hindu festival to celebrate the wedding of Lord Shiva with Parvati, celebrated on the fourteenth day of Krishna Paksha in the month of Phalguna or Magha in the Hindu calendar
March	Nowruz	Floating	Celebrates the beginning of the Persian New Year
March–April	Holi	Floating	Hindu festival of colors to celebrate the victory of good over evil (Specifically the death of the evil Holika, aunt of Prahlad, an ardent devotee of Vishnu) and arrival of spring, celebrated on full-moon day in the month of Phalguna in the Hindu calendar Sikh festival to celebrate with its historic texts referring to it as Hola. Guru Gobind Singh in addition to Holi created a three-day Hola Mohalla extension festival of martial arts. The extension started the day after the Holi festival in Anandpur Sahib, where Sikh soldiers would train in battles, compete in horsemanship, athletics, archery and military exercises.
March–April	Rama Navami	Floating	Hindu festival to celebrate the birth of Lord Rama celebrated on the ninth day of Shukla Paksha in the month of Chaitra in the Hindu calendar
March–April	Ugadi	Floating	Celebrates the beginning of the Telugu and Kannada New Year
March–April	Cheti Chand	Floating	Celebrates the beginning of the Sindhi New Year
April	Puthandu	Floating	Tamil festival It is the first day of the Tamil calendar and celebrates the beginning of the new year in Tamil Nadu. It is also celebrates the agrarian people and harvest on the first day of the Tamil month Chithirai.
April	Vishu	Floating	Celebrates the beginning of the Malayali New Year
April	Vaisakhi	Floating	Sikh festival celebrates the beginning of the Solar new year in North India and spring harvest on the first day of the month of Vaisakh in the Punjabi calendar
April	Bohag Bihu/Pohela Boishakh	Floating	Celebrates the beginning of the Assamese New Year and Bengali New Year
April	Gudi Padwa	Floating	Celebrates the beginning of the Marathi and Konkani New Year
June–July	Ratha Yatra	Floating	Hindu festival involving a public procession of chariots with the deities Jagannath, Balarama and Subhadra celebrated in Ashadha month of Hindu calendar
August–September	Krishna Janmashtami	Floating	Hindu festival to celebrate the birth of Lord Krishna and celebrated on eighth day of Krishna Paksha in the month of Shravana in the Hindu calendar
August–September	Ganesh Chaturthi	Floating	Hindu festival as a tribute to Lord Ganesha, celebrated on the fourth day of Krishna Paksha in the month of Bhadrapada in the Hindu calendar
August–September	Onam	Floating	Hindu harvest festival celebrated by the people of Kerala commemorating the visit of Mahabali and celebrated in Chingam, the first month of Malayalam Calendar
September–October	Navaratri	Floating	Hindu festival celebrating the first day of the Hindu Vikram Samvat calendar
October–November	Chhath	Floating	Hindu harvest festival dedicated to Sun God Surya, celebrated in North and East India on the sixth day of the month of Kartika
October–November	Karva Chauth	Floating	Hindu festival celebrated by women to pray for the longevity of their husbands, observed on the fourth day after the full moon in the month of Kartika

Each year, central and state governments release lists of gazetted and restricted holidays. Comprehensive compiled lists are available online.

== State holidays ==
In addition to the above, various state governments and union territories designate additional holidays on local festivals or days of importance as holidays as per section 25 of the Negotiable Instruments Act, 1881.

=== Harvest festivals ===
State holidays:Harvest festivals
Date	Name	Type	State/UT
13 January	Bhogi	Fixed	Andhra Pradesh, Karnataka, Maharashtra, Tamil Nadu, Telangana
13 January–14 January	Lohri	Floating	Punjab
14 January–15 January	Magh Bihu	Fixed	Assam
14 January	Maghi	Fixed	Haryana, Himachal Pradesh, Jammu, Punjab
1 March	Chapchar Kut	Fixed	Mizoram
September–October	Wangala	Floating	Assam, Meghalaya, Nagaland
October–November	Kati Bihu	Floating	Assam

=== New year ===
State holidays:New year's days
Date	Name	State/UT
13 April–14 April	Bohag Bihu	Assam
March–April	Gudi Padwa	Dadra and Nagar Haveli and Daman and Diu, Maharashtra
August	Losoong	Sikkim
February–March	Losar	Ladakh
1 January	New Year's Day	Arunachal Pradesh, Tamil Nadu, Meghalaya, Manipur, Mizoram, Nagaland, Puducherry, Rajasthan, Sikkim, Telangana
31 December	New Year's Eve	Manipur
13 April–14 April	Pana Sankranti	Odisha
20 March–21 March	Parsi New Year	Dadra and Nagar Haveli and Daman and Diu, Gujarat, Maharashtra
14 April–15 April	Pohela Boishakh	Tripura, West Bengal
13 April–14 April	Puthandu	Tamil Nadu, Puducherry
March–April	Sarhul	Jharkhand
March–April	Sajibu Nongma Panba	Manipur
March–April	Ugadi	Andhra Pradesh, Goa, Gujarat, Jharkhand, Karnataka, Rajasthan, Tamil Nadu, Telangana
13 April–14 April	Vaisakhi	Jharkhand, Punjab
14 April–15 April	Vishu	Kerala
October–November	Diwali	Gujarat, Rajasthan, Dadra and Nagar Haveli and Daman and Diu

=== State days ===
State holidays:State days
Date	Name	State/UT
1 November	Andhra Pradesh Day	Andhra Pradesh
20 February	Arunachal Pradesh Statehood Day	Arunachal Pradesh
2 December	Asom Day	Assam
22 March	Bihar Day	Bihar
1 November	Chhattisgarh Rajyotsava	Chhattisgarh
19 December	Goa Liberation Day	Goa
1 May	Gujarat Day	Gujarat
1 November	Haryana Day	Haryana
15 April	Himachal Day	Himachal Pradesh
15 April	West Bengal Day	West Bengal
26 October	Jammu and Kashmir Accession Day	Jammu and Kashmir
1 November	Kannada Rajyothsava	Karnataka
1 November	Kerala Day	Kerala
1 May	Maharashtra Day	Maharashtra
20 February	Mizoram State Day	Mizoram
1 December	Nagaland State Inauguration Day	Nagaland
1 April	Odisha Day	Odisha
16 August	Puducherry De Jure Transfer Day	Puducherry
1 November	Puducherry Liberation Day	Puducherry
16 May	Sikkim State Day	Sikkim
2 June	Telangana Formation Day	Telangana
17 September	Hyderabad-Karnataka Liberation Day	Karnataka

=== Birth and anniversary days ===
State holidays:Birth and anniversary days
Date	Name	State/UT
14 April	Ambedkar Jayanti	India
April–June	Buddha's Birthday	India
2 October	Gandhi Jayanti	India
5 April	Babu Jag Jivan Ram's Birthday	Bihar
2 January	Mannathu Padmanabha Pillai's Birthday	Kerala
23 April	Basava Jayanti	Karnataka
13 July	Bhanu Jayanti	Sikkim
19 February	Chhatrapati Shivaji Maharaj Jayanti	Maharashtra
18 December	Guru Ghasidas Jayanti	Chandigarh
February	Guru Ravidass Jayanti	Chandigarh, Haryana, Himachal Pradesh, Punjab
23 September	Heroes' Martyrdom Day	Haryana
26 September	Janmotsav	Assam
4 June	Kabir Jayanti	Chandigarh, Himachal Pradesh, Haryana, Punjab
15 November	Kanakadasa Jayanthi	Karnataka
25 May	Kazi Nazrul Islam Jayanti	Tripura
15 October	Maharaja Agrasen Jayanti	Haryana
23 September	Maharaja Hari Singh Ji's Birthday	Jammu and Kashmir
9 May	Maharana Pratap Jayanti	Rajasthan
13 July	Martyrs' Day	Jharkhand
23 January	Netaji's Birthday	Odisha, Tripura, West Bengal
12 December	Pa Togan Sangma	Meghalaya
7 May	Rabindranath Tagore's Birthday	West Bengal
26 September	Ramdev Jayanti	Rajasthan
23 March	Shaheedi Diwas	Punjab
31 October	Sardar Vallabhbhai Patel's Birthday	Gujarat
26 December	Shaheed Udham Singh Jayanti	Haryana
31 July	Shaheed Udham Singh Martyrdom day	Haryana
20 August	Sree Narayana Guru Jayanthi	Kerala
20 September	Sree Narayana Guru Samadhi	Kerala
12 January	Swami Vivekananda's Birthday	West Bengal
15 January–16 January	Thiruvalluvar Day	Tamil Nadu
18 December	U Soso Tham Death Anniversary	Meghalaya
30 December	U Kiang Nangbah	Meghalaya
17 July	U Tirot Sing Day	Meghalaya

=== Religious days ===
State holidays:Religious days
Date	Name	Type	State/UT
June–July	Akshaya Tritiya	Hindu	Maharashtra, Karnataka, Tamil Nadu, Andhra Pradesh, Kerala, Uttar Pradesh, Gujarat, Rajasthan, Punjab
October–November	Ayudha Puja	Hindu	Tamil Nadu, Karnataka, Kerala, Andhra Pradesh, Telangana, Lakshadweep
September–October	Bathukamma	Hindu	Telangana
November	Bhai Dooj	Hindu	Gujarat, Rajasthan, Uttarakhand, Uttar Pradesh
June	Bonalu	Hindu	Telangana
October–November	Chhath	Hindu	Bihar, Jharkhand, Uttar Pradesh
March	Dol Jatra	Hindu	West Bengal
October	Durga Puja	Hindu	West Bengal
August–September	Ganesh Chaturthi	Hindu	Andhra Pradesh, Daman and Diu, Dadra and Nagar Haveli, Goa, Gujarat, Karnataka, Maharashtra, Odisha, Puducherry, Telangana, Tamil Nadu
October–November	Ghatasthapana	Hindu	Rajasthan
April	Garia Puja	Hindu	Tripura
November	Govardhan Puja	Hindu	Haryana
April	Hanuman Jayanti	Hindu	Andhra Pradesh, Karnataka, Kerala, Maharashtra, Tamil Nadu, Uttar Pradesh
August–September	Hartalika Teej	Hindu	Chandigarh, Sikkim
September–October	Haryali Teej	Hindu	Haryana
March–April	Holi	Hindu	Pan India except Delhi, Karnataka, Kerala, Lakshadweep, Manipur, Puducherry, Tamil Nadu, West Bengal
March	Holika Dahan	Hindu	Rajasthan
August–September	Jhulan Purnima	Hindu	Odisha
November	Kali Puja	Hindu	West Bengal
November	Kartika Purnima	Hindu	Odisha, Tamil Nadu
July	Ker Puja	Hindu	Tripura
June	Kharchi Puja	Hindu	Tripura
August–September	Krishna Janmashtami	Hindu	Andaman and Nicobar, Andhra Pradesh, Bihar, Chandigarh, Chhattisgarh, Delhi, Gujarat, Haryana, Himachal Pradesh, Jammu and Kashmir, Jharkhand, Madhya Pradesh, Meghalaya, Nagaland, Odisha, Punjab, Rajasthan, Sikkim, Tamil Nadu, Telangana, Tripura, Uttarakhand, Uttar Pradesh
October	Lakshmi Puja	Hindu	Odisha, Tripura, West Bengal
October–November	Maha Astami	Hindu	Arunachal Pradesh, Bihar, Jharkhand, Rajasthan, Telangana, West Bengal
March–April	Maha Navami	Hindu	Andhra Pradesh, Telangana
October–November	Maha Saptami	Hindu	Odisha, Sikkim, Tripura, West Bengal
February–March	Maha Shivaratri	Hindu	Andhra Pradesh ,Arunachal Pradesh ,Assam ,Bihar ,Chhattisgarh , Goa ,Gujarat ,Haryana ,Himachal Pradesh, Jharkhand ,Karnataka ,Kerala ,Madhya Pradesh ,Maharashtra ,Manipur ,Meghalaya ,Mizoram ,Nagaland , Odisha ,Punjab ,Rajasthan ,Sikkim ,Tamil Nadu , Telangana ,Tripura ,Uttar Pradesh ,Uttarakhand ,West Bengal
October	Mahalaya	Hindu	Karnataka, Odisha, Tripura, West Bengal
October	Maharishi Valmiki Jayanti	Hindu	Chandigarh, Haryana, Karnataka, Madhya Pradesh, Punjab
April	Nag Panchami	Hindu	Maharashtra
April–May	Maharshi Parasuram Jayanti	Hindu	Gujarat, Himachal Pradesh, Haryana, Madhya Pradesh, Rajasthan
June	Raja Parba	Hindu	Odisha
August	Raksha Bandhan	Hindu	Chandigarh, Gujarat, Haryana, Madhya Pradesh, Rajasthan, Uttarakhand, Uttar Pradesh
March–April	Ram Navami	Hindu	Andaman and Nicobar Islands, Andhra Pradesh, Bihar, Chandigarh, Daman and Diu, Gujarat, Himachal Pradesh, Haryana, Karnataka, Maharashtra, Madhya Pradesh, Odisha, Punjab, Rajasthan, Sikkim, Tamil Nadu, Telangana, Uttarakhand, Uttar Pradesh
November	Rahasa Purnima	Hindu	Odisha
June–July	Rath Jatra	Hindu	Odisha
February	Ratha Saptami	Hindu	Andhra Pradesh, Goa, Karnataka, Maharashtra
September–October	Teja Dashmi	Hindu	Rajasthan
January–February	Thaipusam	Hindu	Tamil Nadu
January–February	Vasant Panchami	Hindu	Haryana, Odisha, Punjab, Tripura, West Bengal
September	Vishwakarma day	Hindu	Assam, Bihar, Karnataka, Uttar Pradesh, West Bengal
February	Dosmoche	Buddhist	Ladakh
July	Drupka Teshi	Buddhist	Ladakh
November	Lhabab Duchen	Buddhist	Sikkim
December	Pang-Lhabsol	Buddhist	Sikkim
20 Safar	Chehlum	Muslim	Bihar, Uttar Pradesh
Last Friday of Ramadan	Jumat-ul-Vida	Muslim	Jammu and Kashmir
10 Muharram	Mohm Hajarat Ali	Muslim	Bihar
The last 10 days of Ramadan	Shab-I-Qadr	Muslim	Jammu and Kashmir
December	Feast of St. Francis Xavier	Christian	Goa
April	Easter	Christian	Kerala
11 January	Missionary Day	Christian	Meghalaya
5 January	Guru Gobind Singh Ji's birthday	Sikh	Chandigarh, Haryana
19 June	Guru Hargobind Ji's birthday	Sikh	Jharkhand
28 August	Parkash Utsav Sri Guru Granth Sahib Ji	Sikh	Punjab
3 June	Sri Guru Arjun Dev Ji's Martyrdom Day	Sikh	Punjab
28 November	Sri Guru Teg Bahadur Ji's Martyrdom Day	Sikh	Punjab
August	Samvatsari	Jain	Gujarat
July	Behdienkhlam	Indigenous	Meghalaya
November	Chapchar Kut	Indigenous	Mizoram
December	Indigenous Faith Day	Indigenous	Arunachal Pradesh, Assam
January	Gaan-Ngai	Indigenous	Assam, Manipur, Nagaland
January	Imoinu Iratpa	Indigenous	Manipur
October	Indrajatra	Indigenous	Sikkim
February	Lui Ngai Ni	Indigenous	Manipur
January	Me-Dam-Me-Phi	Indigenous	Assam
November	Ningol Chakouba	Indigenous	Manipur
September	Nuakhai	Indigenous	Odisha
August	Tendong Lho Rumfaat	Indigenous	Sikkim
March	Yaosang	Indigenous	Manipur

=== Others ===
State holidays:Others
Date	Name	State/UT
1 May	May Day	Assam, Bihar, Goa, Karnataka, Kerala, Manipur, Puducherry, Telangana, Tamil Nadu, Tripura, West Bengal
6 July	MHIP day	Mizoram
13 August	Patriot's day	Manipur
24 April	Panchaytiraj Diwas	Odisha
30 June	Remna Ni	Mizoram
23 November	Seng Kut Snem	Mizoram
15 June	YMA Day	Mizoram

== Others ==
Banks have specific holidays according to the various states or union territories in addition to every second and fourth Saturdays of the month. 1st April of every year is also a national bank holiday in India for annual closing of accounts as it is the first day of financial year. Schools, colleges and other educational institutions have specific term holidays according to the state or board.

== See also ==
- Nepali Language Recognition Day
- Eighth Schedule to the Constitution of India
- Languages of India
- Sikkim
- Language movement (disambiguation)
