= UP Gaurav Samman =

Uttar Pradesh Gaurav Samman
- Awarded for: Excellence in an area of importance at the national or international level
- Sponsored by: Uttar Pradesh Government
- Date: 24 January
- Country: India
- Presented by: Uttar Pradesh Government
- Formerly called: Yash Bharti

UP Gaurav Samman or Uttar Pradesh Gaurav Samman is a civilian award presented by the Government of Uttar Pradesh, India. The recipients are awarded a citation, a state emblem made in brass and a cash prize.

== History ==
The award was announced in 2021 and entries were sought for 2022-23 year. However, no honors were given that year. Entries were sought again for the 2023-24 year with November 2023 as the deadline for the nominations. Naveen Tewari and Dr. Ritu Karidhal were honored with Gaurav Samman on Uttar Pradesh Divas, also known as the Uttar Pradesh Day, observed on the 24th January and the awards were presented by the Chief Minister of the state, Yogi Adityanath. The awardees received a citation, a state emblem made in brass and a cash prize of ₹ 11 lakhs (US$ 13,000) each.

== Award categories ==
The UP Gaurav Samman is awarded in following categories:

- Arts and culture
- Social service
- Agriculture
- Entrepreneurship
- Other fields

== Notable recipients ==
Year	Name	Image	Occupation & Designation	Description
2023-24	Naveen Tewari	Naveen Tewari receiving UP Gaurav Samman from Chief Minister Yogi Adityanath on UP Day	Entrepreneur Founder & CEO, InMobi Group	Founded India's first unicorn and founded yet another unicorn in Glance.
2023-24	Dr. Ritu Karidhal	Dr. Ritu receiving UP Gaurav Samman from Chief Minister Yogi Adityanath on UP Day	Scientist India Space Research Organization (ISRO)	For role in the Chandrayaan Mission as the Mission Director of Mission Moon.
