= Jharkhand Day =

Day of the formation of the state of Jharkhand

- Official name: Jhārkhaṇḍ Sthāpana Divasa
- Also called: Jharkhand Day, Jharkhand Sthapna Divas
- Observed by: Jharkhand, India
- Significance: Marks the formation of the state of Jharkhand from Bihar
- Celebrations: Official ceremonies, cultural programmes
- Observances: Government functions, award distribution, cultural events
- Date: 15 November
- Next time: 15 November 2026
- Frequency: Annual
- Related to: Janjatiya Gaurav Divas

Jharkhand Day is the state foundation day of Jharkhand, observed annually on 15 November. On this day in 2000, Jharkhand was carved out of southern districts of Bihar to become the 28th state of India under the Bihar Reorganisation Act, 2000.

== History ==
The demand for a separate state of Jharkhand originated in the early 20th century with organisations such as the Jharkhand Party, which sought recognition of the distinct cultural and tribal identity of the region. After decades of political movements and deliberations, the Parliament of India passed the Bihar Reorganisation Act, 2000, during the tenure of the NDA government led by Prime Minister Atal Bihari Vajpayee. The Act came into effect on 15 November 2000, and Babulal Marandi was sworn in as the first Chief Minister of the newly created state.

== Significance ==
The date coincides with the birth anniversary of Birsa Munda, a tribal freedom fighter and folk hero of the region. Since 2021, the Government of India has also observed 15 November as Janjatiya Gaurav Divas (Tribal Pride Day) in honour of Birsa Munda and the contribution of tribal communities to the freedom struggle. Jharkhand Foundation Day highlights the cultural heritage of the state and acknowledges the contribution of its tribal communities in shaping its identity.

== Observance ==
The state government organises official ceremonies in the capital city, Ranchi, including parades, cultural events, and distribution of state awards. Schools, colleges and civic organisations across Jharkhand also conduct programmes to mark the occasion.

== See also ==
- Bihar Day
- Chhattisgarh Day
- Uttar Pradesh Day
- Janjatiya Gaurav Divas
