= Saramsa Garden =

Botanical garden in Sikkim, India

- Botanical Garden
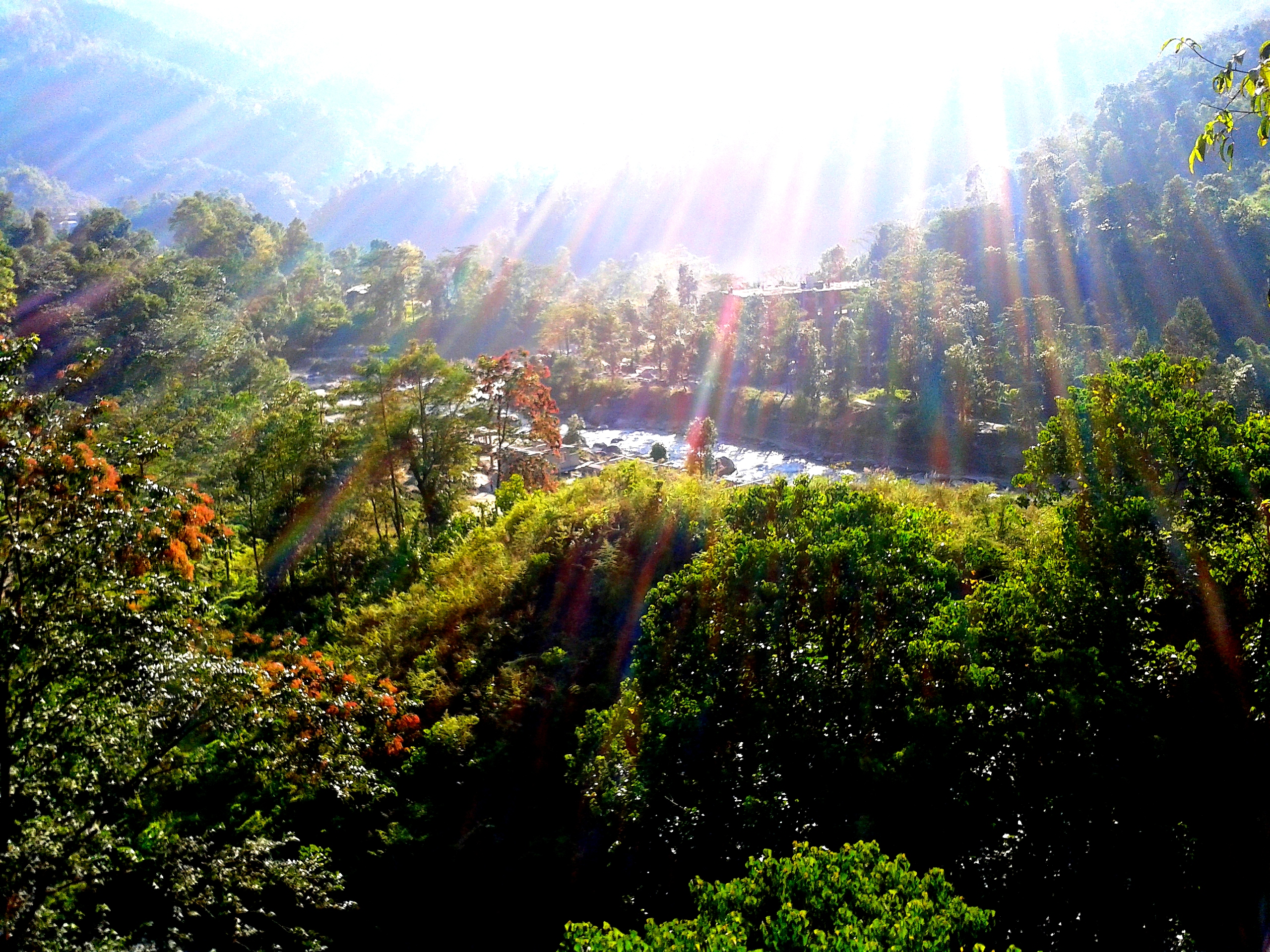
- Saramsa Garden, Gangtok, in 2013
- Nickname: Ipecac Garden
- Location in Sikkim, India
- Coordinates: 27.277°N 88.595°E
- Country: India
- State: Sikkim
- District: Pakyong District
- Established: 1922
- Founder: Forest Department, Government of Sikkim

Languages
- Time zone: UTC+5:30 (IST)

Saramsa Garden, also known as Ipecac Garden, is a public garden close to Ranipool, in Pakyong District, Sikkim, India. Established in 1922, the garden has served a variety of purposes. Initially dedicated to growing fruit for the local colonial officers, it later became known for cultivating the medicinal plant ipecacuanha. For this reason the garden is also known as Ipecac Garden. When the growing of ipecacuanha was discontinued, the garden was repurposed as an orchidarium and a recreational garden for picknickers. In 2008, the garden hosted the International Floriculture Show, attracting 50,000 visitors on each of its three days.

== Location ==
Saramsa Garden is located between the hill slopes of Gangtok and Pakyong on NH-717A. The park is situated approximately 12 kilometres (7.5 mi) from Pakyong and 14 kilometres (8.7 mi) away from the capital Gangtok.

== History ==
The garden was established in 1922 by the Sikkim Forest Department. From 1922 to 1954 the Forest Manager nurtured the garden as his pet project with intense involvement in introduction of plants. His interest in botany, floriculture and horticulture largely helped in his pursuit. Initially established with the main purpose of growing different fruits like pineapple, guava, varieties of oranges and lychee for the British Political officer and the Palace, the garden developed into a main center for introduction of fruits. The practice of growing fruits continued until 1940, after which the Forest Department introduced ipecacuanha from Zohore in Malaysia. This is used in the production of syrup of ipecac, a powerful emetic. Though cultivation of ipecacuanha was discontinued in 1970, the garden is still famous by the name Ipecac Garden. In 1975, the garden was converted into an orchidarium for growing different types of orchids. The majority of plants and trees that can be seen growing in the garden at present were introduced from 1975 until 1980. In 2008 the garden hosted the International Flori Show, an event promoted by the Government of Sikkim to promote the region as a centre of floriculture.
