= Naveen S Tewari =

Indian entrepreneur (born 1977)

Naveen S. Tewari
- Born: 1977 (age 48–49); Kanpur, Uttar Pradesh, India
- Education: IIT Kanpur (B.Tech); Harvard Business School (MBA)
- Occupation: Entrepreneur
- Known for: Founder and CEO of InMobi; founder of Glance

Naveen S. Tewari (born 1977) is an Indian entrepreneur. He is the founder and chief executive officer of InMobi, a mobile advertising and technology company, and the founder of Glance, a lock-screen content platform owned by InMobi.

Under Tewari, InMobi became India's first venture-capital-backed unicorn in 2011, reaching a valuation of more than US$1 billion after an investment from the SoftBank Group. His second venture, Glance, launched in 2019 and crossed a US$1 billion valuation in 2020. In 2021, Forbes India named him Outstanding Startup Entrepreneur at its Leadership Awards.

== Early life and education ==
Tewari was born in Kanpur, Uttar Pradesh, and grew up on the campus of the Indian Institute of Technology Kanpur, where several of his relatives worked as academics; his family had hoped he would pursue a doctorate and an academic career. He studied at IIT Kanpur, graduating with a Bachelor of Technology in 2000. He then attended Harvard Business School, where he completed a Master of Business Administration in 2005 and received the Dean's Award.

== Career ==
=== Early career ===
Tewari joined McKinsey & Company as a business analyst in 2000, working on a market-entry strategy for an Indian conglomerate moving into the telecommunications sector, and remained there until 2003. During and after his MBA he worked with the Silicon Valley venture capital firm Charles River Ventures, an experience he later described as the turning point that drew him to startups.

=== InMobi ===
In 2007, Tewari co-founded mKhoj, an SMS-based search engine, in Mumbai, together with Mohit Saxena, Amit Gupta and Abhay Singhal; the business was incorporated in Singapore to widen its investor base. After mKhoj failed to gain traction, Tewari and his co-founders refocused the company on mobile advertising and renamed it InMobi, reportedly financing the relaunch with credit-card debt and drawing investment from Kleiner Perkins and Sherpalo Ventures.

Tewari expanded InMobi internationally soon after the relaunch, entering South Africa and Europe before North America, a sequence he attributed to weaker competition and faster mobile adoption in emerging markets. In 2011, he secured a US$200 million investment from SoftBank, which made InMobi India's first venture-capital-backed unicorn. By 2015, the BBC reported that InMobi was the third-largest company in mobile advertising, behind only Google and Facebook.

In 2015, Tewari oversaw the launch of Miip, a discovery-based advertising product that did not gain adoption; he later said the product "bombed gloriously" and that the failure dented his confidence for several years. In 2016, during his tenure as CEO, InMobi settled United States Federal Trade Commission charges that it had tracked the locations of hundreds of millions of users, including children, in a manner inconsistent with its stated privacy practices and the Children's Online Privacy Protection Act; the settlement carried a civil penalty reduced to US$950,000.

In 2021, Tewari explored a United States listing for InMobi at a valuation of up to US$15 billion, but the plan was halted amid a market downturn during the COVID-19 pandemic. In 2024, he said InMobi would move its corporate base from Singapore to India in early 2025 and pursue an initial public offering in India later that year, adding that the company had been profitable for several years, with sales of about US$268 million in the financial year ended March 2023.

=== Glance ===
Tewari launched Glance in 2019 as an India-based internet platform; InMobi remains its largest shareholder. He raised US$145 million for Glance from Google and Mithril Capital in 2020, a round that valued it at more than US$1 billion, and a further US$200 million from Jio Platforms in 2022 at a valuation of about US$1.7 billion. By 2024, the company said Glance had more than 450 million users, though tech media outlets and users have criticised the pre-installed software as bloatware because of difficulties in disabling it. By late 2025, Tewari had shifted Glance toward generative AI and "agentic" commerce, investing about US$200 million in an AI commerce agent; the company became the subject of a Harvard Business School case study.

== Views ==
In February 2025, at an event hosted by the investment platform LetsVenture, Tewari said InMobi expected to automate about 80 percent of its software coding by the end of that year and that its software engineers would not have their jobs within two years, urging technology professionals to reskill. The remarks were widely reported in the Indian business press.

== Board memberships and investments ==
Tewari joined the board of Paytm (One97 Communications) in 2015 and became an independent director of Narayana Health in 2023. He is an angel investor in several startups, including Razorpay, and co-founded iSPIRT, a software-product think tank.

== Recognition ==
- Fortune India 40 Under 40 (2015)
- Outstanding Startup Entrepreneur, Forbes India Leadership Awards (2021)
