= Robin Hood Army =

Volunteer-based NGO group

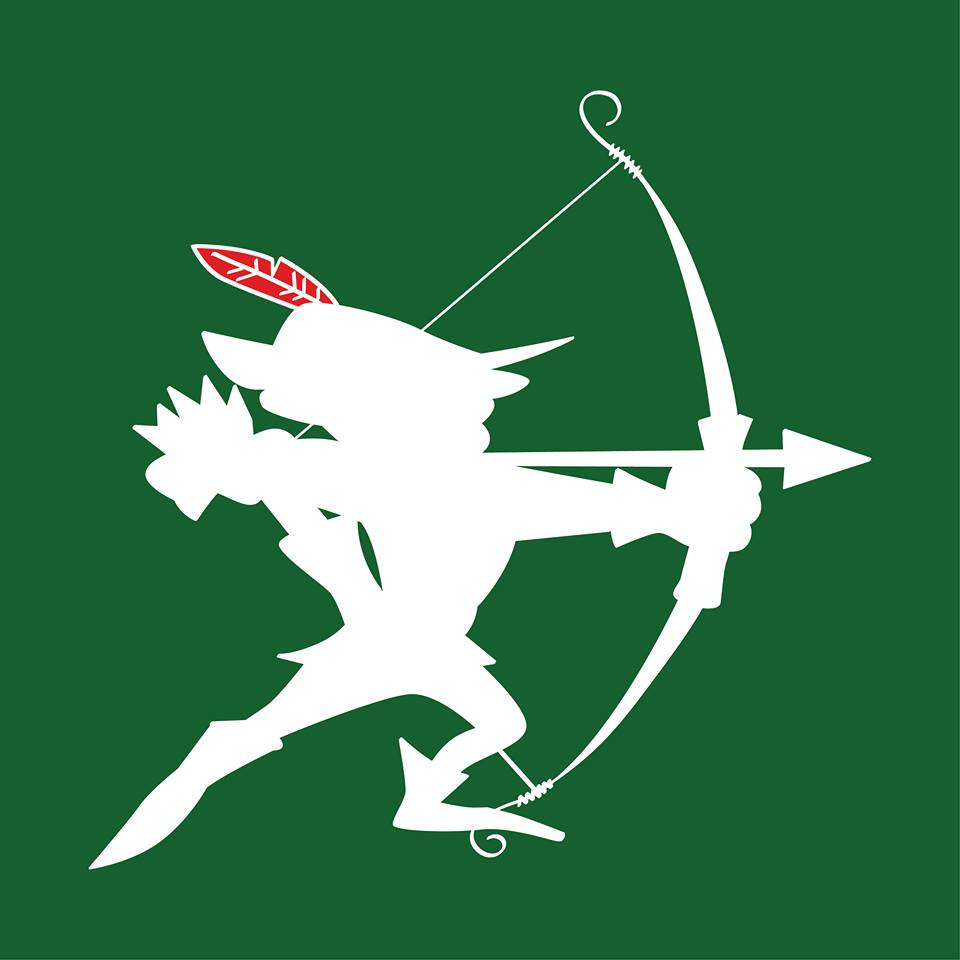
- Abbreviation: RHA
- Established: 26 August 2014
- Founders: Neel Ghose; Anand Sinha; Aarushi Batra
- Purpose: Hunger Alleviation
- Headquarters: New Delhi, India
- Location(s): Bahrain; Bangladesh; Botswana; India; Malaysia; Nepal; Nigeria; Pakistan; Sri Lanka; Uganda; Zambia
- Website: http://robinhoodarmy.com

The Robin Hood Army is a non profit volunteer-based organization that works to get surplus food from restaurants to the disadvantaged in cities across India and 13 other countries. They have served food to over 118.46 million people including individuals who are homeless and in orphanages, old-age homes, night shelters, homes for abandoned children, and public hospitals. The organization has over 218,912 volunteers in 401 cities.

== About ==
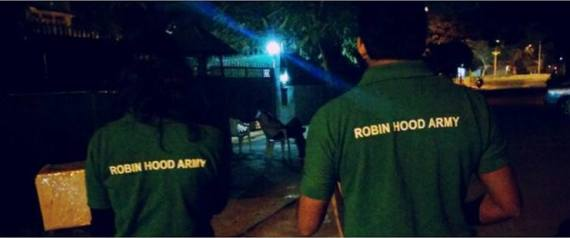
The RHA Volunteers heading out for a distribution.

The Robin Hood Army was founded by Neel Ghose, Aarushi Batra and Anand Sinha. The food distributed to the needy is sourced from restaurants, which regularly provide surplus or freshly cooked food on a goodwill basis. The Robin Hood Army is still working in its war against hunger and plans to grow its presence worldwide in the next few years.

The Robin Hood Army originated in New Delhi, India, and then eventually spread its operations to other Indian cities such as Kolkata, Mumbai, Hyderabad, Bangalore, Jaipur, Jabalpur, Panipat, Gurgaon, Pune Dehradun, Faridabad, Rajkot, Ahmedabad, Surat. On 15 February 2015, the Robin Hood Army commenced its activities in Karachi, Pakistan.

The organization functions on and propagates the basic ideology of self-sustained communities across the city i.e. each locality/community within the city will contribute towards providing food to the needy through its local volunteers and restaurants.

== Approach and mission ==
Currently the organization has tied up with multiple restaurants across the 60 cities that provide them with food. The organization does not accept monetary donations and only distributes the food or donations in kind that it receives from its restaurant partners and donors.

The Robin Hood Army, wearing green T-shirts, applies the following principles to further its cause:

1. Spread awareness of its activities through social media to promote the idea of self-sustained communities.
2. Tie-ups and associations with restaurants to provide food in large Numbers to the homeless/less fortunate communities.
3. Introduce new volunteers on a regular basis to the system, to create an impact amongst the less fortunate and in the process inspire a community to give time and help to those who need it most.

== Campaigns ==
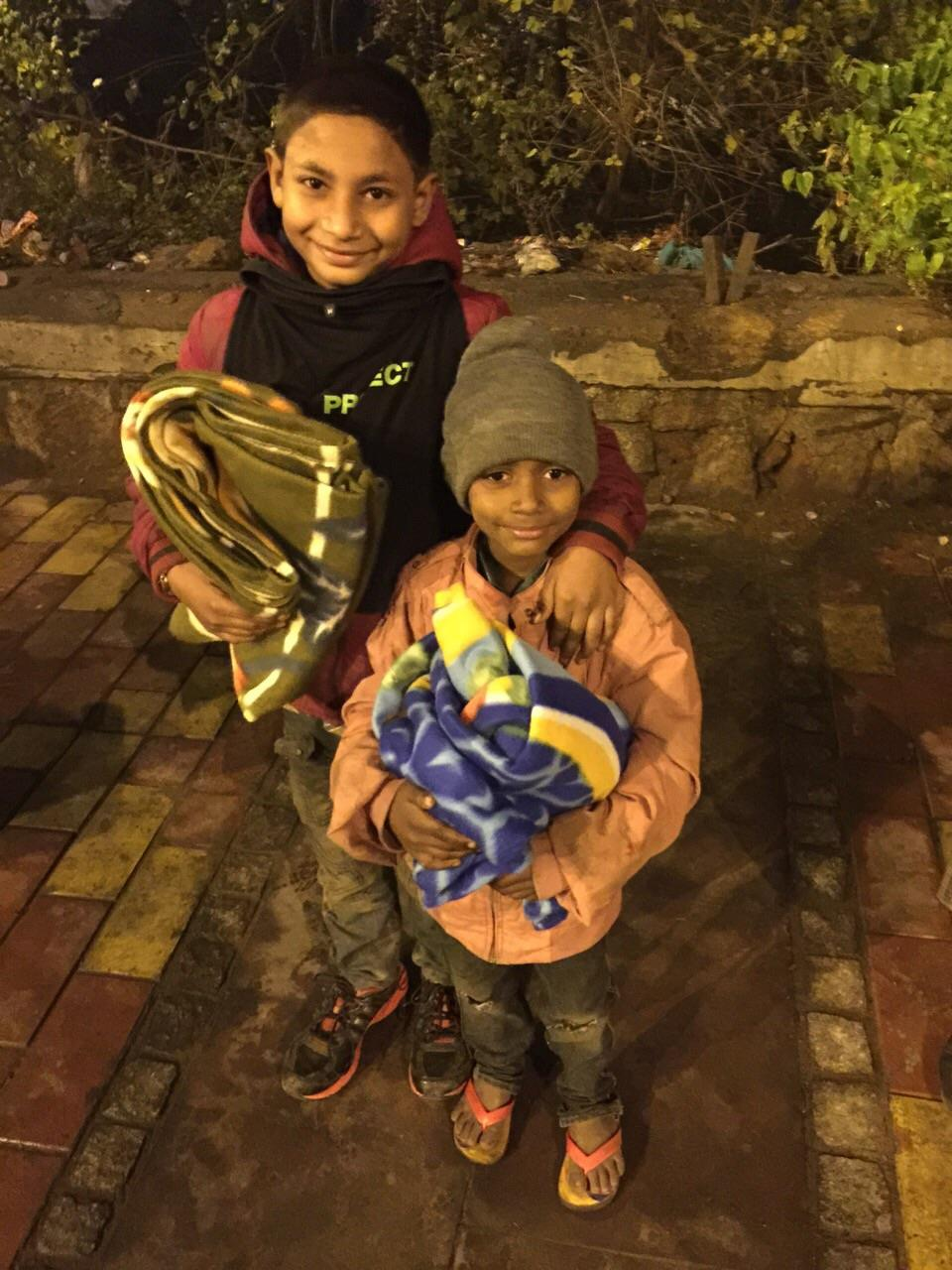
Blanket Distribution during the RHA Winter Campaign

The Robin Hood actively leverages Facebook and Twitter to generate awareness and inspire new volunteers to join. The organization routinely launches social media campaigns on special occasions or festivals.

- In October 2014, during the festival Diwali, the Robin Hood Army launched a Facebook campaign which was aimed at inspiring their social media followers to gift anything ranging from food, clothes, toys, sweets, etc. to the needy, and post a picture of the act with the hashtag #BeRobinthisDiwali. These pictures were then reshared on the Robin Hood Army Facebook page.
- Another social media campaign, the Robin Hood Army Winter Campaign, was launched in December 2014 with the hashtag #BeRobinthisChristmas. The campaign aimed at setting up collection boxes in offices across India to collect warm clothes and blankets which were then distributed by volunteers to help the homeless in winter.
- The Robin Hood Army partnered with Uber, ScoopWhoop and Zomato to launch a unique initiative on Independence Day, 2015 - #Mission100K. The initiative aimed at uniting students across the Indian subcontinent, rallying them together and serve food to 100,000 homeless people on Independence Day. #Mission100K was successfully conducted in 23 cities, including 141 colleges and offices and 2400 citizens participating in the initiative. The participants of the initiative visited 42 orphanages and served 78,559 less fortunate people. The #Mission100K campaign was widely covered by various digital, print, radio and television media.
- In August 2016, Marquee startups, Uber, Zomato, Snapdeal, Oyo, Blinkit (formerly Grofers), Inshorts, Roposo, InMobi, and Pressplay and musical artists - Farhan Akhtar, Vishal Dadlani and Uday Benegal partnered with the Robin Hood Army to unite Indians and Pakistanis across the border to serve 516,000 less fortunate people on Independence Day as part of their #mission500K campaign.
- In April 2016, Rural Maharashtra experienced its worst drought in decades, several farmers committed suicide. The Robins sprang to action and worked relentlessly day and night to help their fellow citizens. The Result: 75,000 liters of drinking water personally collected and transported via a special train to Latur.
- In October 2016, the Robin Hood Army launched its #ADiwaliToRemember campaign. It started with a simple idea - to make Diwali special for someone who needed it more than the Roins. There were games, magic shows, football matches, dance lessons, Rangoli competitions, Diya decorating, hygiene drives, Wall of Dreams, and Tae Kwon Do lessons.
- In August 2017, the Robin Hood Army undertook an unprecedented project along with media companies, the startup ecosystem and celebrities - #Mission1Million. In the largest ever war against hunger (without raising money), #Mission1Million aimed to mobilise Indians and Pakistanis together to serve food to 1 million countrymen to mark Independence Day. The agenda also included raising awareness on the national hunger problem (>200 million hungry citizens) and mobilise citizens to hit the streets and help irrespective of nationality, faith and religion. The Robins across both countries successfully managed to serve 1.34 Million meals during this event. There were old age home visits, get togethers with women who survived acid attacks, opening bank accounts for people, making public toilets using waste materials.
- On 15 August 2018, on occasion of 72nd years of Independence of India, the Robin Hood Army launched #MissionMillion2018. In a day they served 1.99 million people across 70 cities in India.

== International expansion ==
Robin Hood Army (RHA) initiated its Karachi, Pakistan operations on 15 February 2015, which coincided with the India-Pakistan cricket match of the ICC Cricket World Cup, 2015.

Between February 2015 and February 2017, the Robin Hood Army has set up chapters in 10 more countries including Bangladesh, Nepal & Sri Lanka in the Indian Sub-Continent, Malaysia, Philippines & Indonesia in South-East Asia, Egypt in Africa, Mexico in North America and Melbourne in Australia.

== Robin Hood Academy ==
In July 2016, the Robin Hood Academy was started with the purpose to bridge the gap between streets and school. As of December 2021, the Robin Hood Academy has empowered 7300+ street children with basic primary education. The Robins conduct weekly classes and excursions with a standardized curriculum.

Along with teaching the students, the Robins also support students with the procedure for enrollment into government schools and as of December 2023 they've managed to get 2084 school admissions for street children across 200 cities.
