= Ritu Karidhal =

Indian scientist and aerospace engineer

Dr. Ritu Karidhal Srivastava
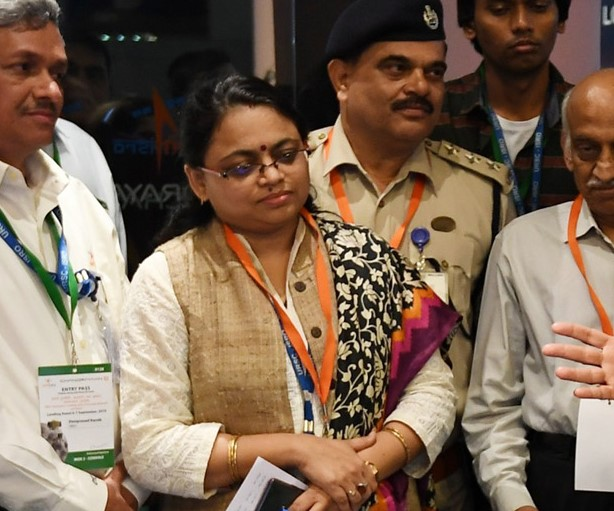
- Ritu Karidhal at ISRO after Chandrayan mission
- Born: 13 April 1975 (age 51); Lucknow, Uttar Pradesh, India
- Education: University of Lucknow; Indian Institute of Science
- Occupation: Scientist
- Years active: 1997–present
- Works: Mars Orbiter Mission, Chandrayaan-2, Chandrayaan-3
- Spouse: Avinash Srivastava
- Children: Aditya, Anisha
- Awards: ISRO Young Scientist Award

Ritu Karidhal Srivastava is an Indian scientist and aerospace engineer working in the Indian Space Research Organisation (ISRO). She was a Deputy Operations Director to India's Mars orbital mission, Mangalyaan. Giving tribute to her excellence in Mangalayaan mission, a Bollywood film Mission Mangal was created where Indian actress Vidya Balan did her role.

== Early life and family ==
Karidhal was born in Lucknow, Uttar Pradesh. She grew up in a middle-class family which placed great emphasis on education.She studied in St. Anjani's Public School in Lucknow. She has two brothers and two sisters. Lack of resources and unavailability of coaching institutions and tuitions left her to rely only on her self motivation to succeed. As a child, she knew that her interest was in the space sciences. Gazing at the night sky for hours and thinking about outer space, she wondered about the moon, as to how it changes its shape and size; studied the stars and wanted to know what lay behind the dark space. In her teens, she started collecting newspaper cuttings about any space-related activity and kept track of the activities of ISRO and NASA.

Karidhal completed her B. Sc. in Physics from University of Lucknow. She Completed her M. Sc. in Physics from University of Lucknow and got enrolled in a doctorate course in the Physics Department. She later taught in the same department. She was a research scholar at Lucknow University for six months. She joined IISc, Bangalore, to pursue masters in aerospace engineering.

She has been conferred honoris causa (an honorary doctorate) D.Sc by Lucknow University during annual convocation 2019.

== Career ==
Ritu Karidhal has worked for ISRO since 1997. She played a key role in the development of India's Mars Orbiter Mission, Mangalyaan, dealing with the detailing and the execution of the craft's onward autonomy system. She was also the Deputy Operations Director of this mission.

Mangalyan was one of the greatest achievements of ISRO. It made India the fourth country in the world to reach Mars. It was done in 18 months time and at a far lesser cost to the taxpayers - ₹450 crores only. Her job was to conceptualize and execute the craft's onward autonomy system, which operated the satellite's functions independently in space and responded appropriately to malfunctions.

She supervised the Chandrayaan 2 mission as the mission director.

When the United Kingdom assumed presidency of the G7 in 2021, Karidhal was appointed by the country's Minister for Women and Equalities Liz Truss to a newly formed Gender Equality Advisory Council (GEAC) chaired by Sarah Sands.

Again in 2023, India launched the Chandrayaan-3 mission to land on the lunar South pole and finally India became the first country to soft land on the lunar South pole. Ritu Karidhal too worked for the same mission and led India to this huge success.

== Recognition ==
Karidhal received the UP Gaurav Samman award from Uttar Pradesh Chief Minister Yogi Adityanath on UP Day, 24 January 2024.

Karidhal received the ISRO Young Scientist Award in 2007 from A. P. J. Abdul Kalam, the president of India.

Karidhal has also presented at TED and TEDx events describing the success of the Mars Orbiter Mission.

Karidhal was awarded an honorary doctorate by the Lucknow University, her alma mater. It was conferred by Governor Anandiben Patel.
