= Marathwada Liberation Day =

Observance in India

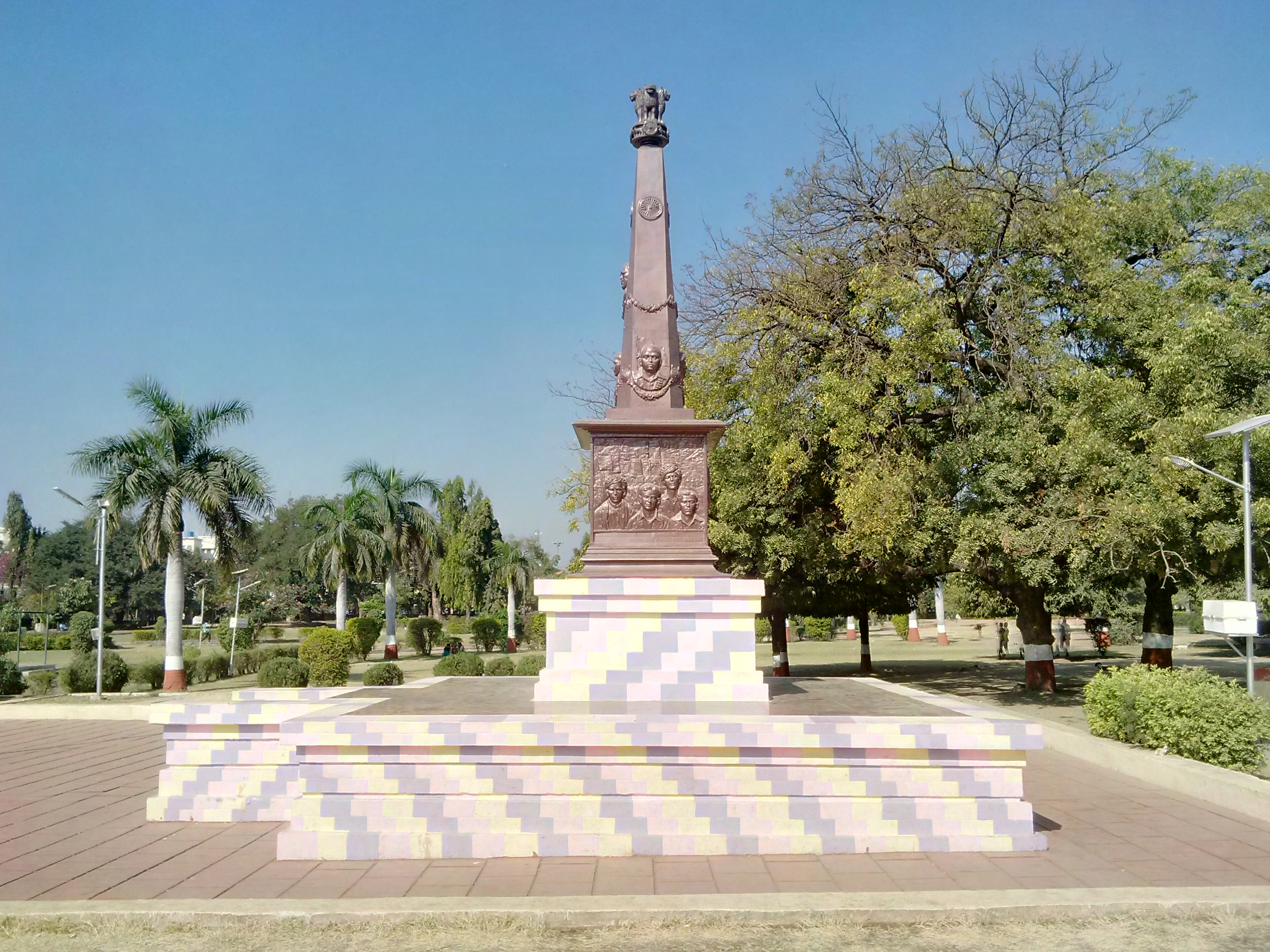
- Side View of Marathwada Martyr Monument, Parbhani
- Observed by: All districts of Sambhajinagar Division, Maharashtra, India
- Significance: Marathwada became part of India on 17 September 1948
- Celebrations: Indian National Flag is hoisted in Marathwada; Various Cultural and Social Programs related to issues of Marathwada; Various Cultural Programs Held at RajgopalChari Uddyan, Parbhani
- Date: 17 September
- Next time: 17 September 2027
- Frequency: Annual
- Related to: Marathwada

Marathwada Liberation Day, also known as Marathwada Mukti Sangram Din, is celebrated in Maharashtra on 17 September annually. It marks the anniversary of Marathwada's integration with India when the Indian military, liberated State of Hyderabad, and defeated the Nizam on 17 September 1948, 13 months after Indian independence.

== History ==
India gained independence from British on 15 August 1947. After the partition, princely states were given the option to join either India or Pakistan. The ruler of Hyderabad, Osman Ali Khan, decided to remain independent. He also appealed to the United Nations that his princely state, which included current Marathwada, Telangana, Kalyana-Karnataka region and Rajura, Korpana, Jiwati Taluka of Chandrapur dist. Vidharbha regions, be granted statehood. This sparked a rebellion in the State. During the revolt Marathwada saw major uprisings against the Razakars . The main leaders of the revolt were Swami Ramanand Tirth, Govindbhai Shroff, Vijayendra Kabra and Ramanbhai Parikh and P H Patwardhan. Bahirji Shinde was martyred at Aajegaon in the fight against Nizam.

The Indian government appeared anxious to avoid what it termed a "Balkanization" of the new country and was determined to integrate Hyderabad into the newly formed Indian Union. Amidst the unrest the Indian government launched a military operation named Operation Polo which it termed a "police action". The operation itself took five days, in which the Razakars were defeated and Hyderabad was annexed.

== Related issues ==
Marathwada, Telangana and Kalyana-Karnataka were part of the former princely Hyderabad state. Since 1948, when Hyderabad annexed, 17 September has been celebrated as "Liberation day" by Maharashtra and Karnataka. Evidence of which is observed in Pandit Sunderlal Committee Report.

== See also ==
- Hyderabad-Karnataka Liberation Day
- Tourism in Marathwada
