= Hyderabad-Karnataka Liberation Day =

Annual local holiday in Karnataka, India

Kalyana-Karnataka Liberation Day
- Official name: Kalyana-Karnataka Liberation Day
- Also called: Hyderabad-Karnataka Liberation Day
- Observed by: Bidar district; Kalaburagi district; Yadgir district; Raichur district; Ballari district; Koppal district; Vijayanagara district
- Type: Public & Government
- Significance: Kalyana-Karnataka became part of the India on 17 September 1948
- Celebrations: Indian National Flag is hoisted in seven (7) districts of Kalyana-Karnataka Region; Various Cultural and Social Programs related to issues of Kalyana-Karnataka Region
- Observances: Flag hoisting along with various Historical, Cultural and Social programs related to the region
- Begins: 17 September of every year
- Ends: one day after the start
- Date: 17 September
- Next time: 17 September 2027
- Duration: 24 hours (01 day)
- Frequency: Annual
- First time: 17 September 1948 (78 years ago)
- Related to: Marathwada Liberation Day

Hyderabad-Karnataka Liberation Day, officially known as, Kalyana-Karnataka Liberation Day (Vimochana Diwas) is an annual festival celebrated in seven districts like Bidar district, Kalaburagi district, Yadgir district, Raichur district, Ballari district & Koppal district, Vijayanagara district of Karnataka state, India. It takes place on 17 September. The festival celebrates the annexation of Hyderabad by India in 1948 following the Partition of India and rebellions in Hyderabad State.

== History ==
At the time of Partition in 1947, the princely states of India, who in principle had self-government within their own territories, were subject to subsidiary alliances with the British, giving them control of their external relations. With the Indian Independence Act 1947, the British abandoned all such alliances, leaving the states with the option of opting for full independence. However, by 1948 almost all had acceded to either India or Pakistan. One major exception was that of the wealthiest and most powerful principality, Hyderabad, where the Nizam, Mir Osman Ali Khan, Asaf Jah VII, a Muslim ruler who presided over a largely Hindu population, chose independence and hoped to maintain this with an irregular army. The Nizam was also beset by the Telangana rebellion, which he was unable to subjugate.

Fearing the establishment of a Communist state in Hyderabad by the rebels and the rise of Muslim nationalist Razakar militas, India defeated the Razakars and took the state in September 1948 following a crippling economic blockade. Subsequently, the Nizam signed an instrument of accession, joining India. The operation led to massive violence on communal lines, at times perpetrated by the Indian Army.

Since then, locals commemorate the day as a regional Independence Day. In 2022, Government of Telangana decided to celebrate this day as Telangana National Integration Day (Telangana Jathiya Samaikyatha Vajrotsavam).

== See also ==
- Marathwada Liberation Day

== Sources ==
- Chandra, Bipan; Mukherjee, Aditya; Mukherjee, Mridula (2008) [first published 1999], India Since Independence, Penguin Books India, ISBN 978-0-14-310409-4
- Noorani, A. G. (2014), The Destruction of Hyderabad, Hurst & Co, ISBN 978-1-84904-439-4
