= Janjatiya Gaurav Divas =

Indian observance

Janjatiya Gaurav Divas (translation: Tribal Pride Day) is a name given on 15 November 2021 by the Union Cabinet of the Government of India, in its meeting held on 10 November 2021, to remember the contribution of tribal freedom fighters, as part of the year-long celebration of the 75th anniversary of Indian independence. November 15 is the birthday of the great tribal warrior Birsa Munda.

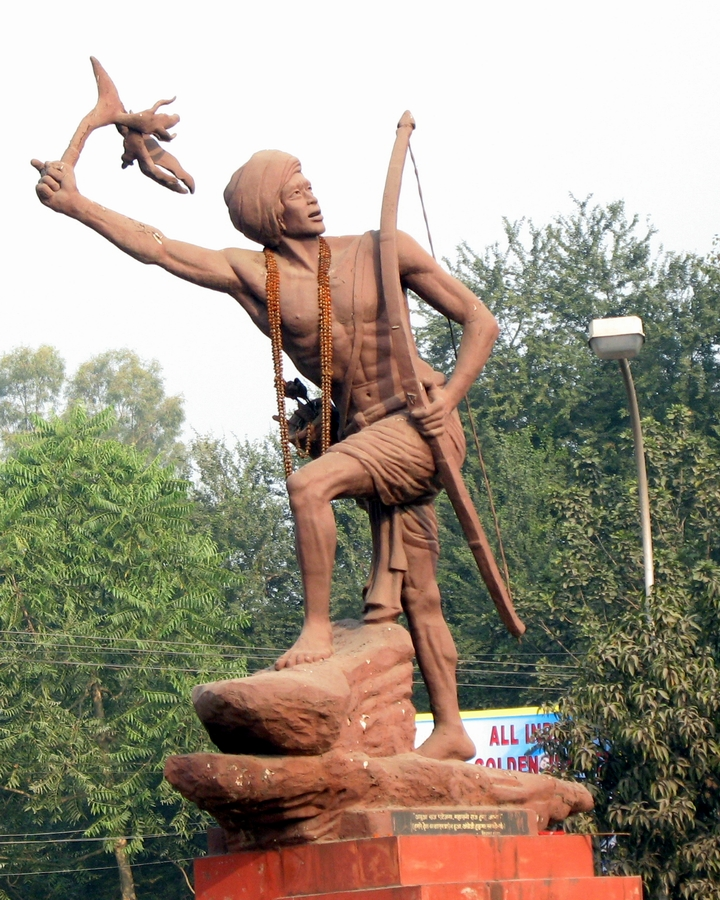
Birsa Munda statue by Nabhendu Sen at Naya More, Bokaro Steel City, Jharkhand
