= Tsuklakhang Palace =

Buddhist palatial monastery in Gangtok, Sikkim, India

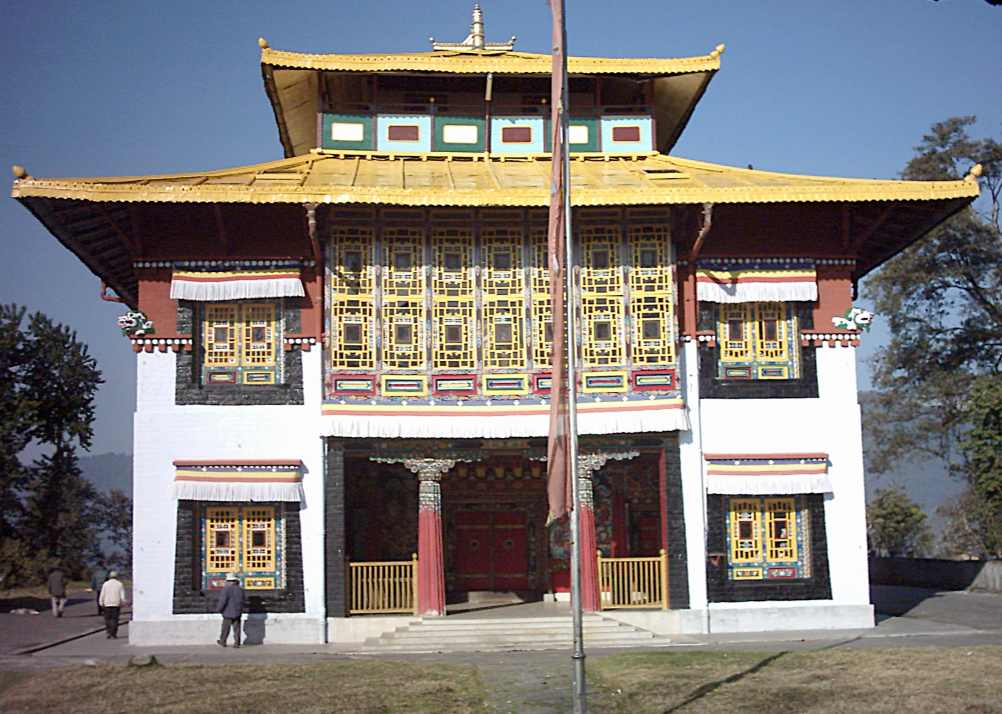
- Tsuklakhang Palace

- Location of Tsuklakhang Palace Tsuklakhang Palace (India)

Religion
- Affiliation: Tibetan Buddhism
- Festivals: Pang Lhabsol, Kagyad, Losar

Location
- Location: Gangtok, Sikkim, India
- Interactive map of Tsuklakhang Palace
- Coordinates: 27.326°N 88.615°E

Architecture
- Established: 1898; 128 years ago

Tsuklakhang Palace or Tsuklakhang Royal Chapel and Monastery (Sikkimese: གཙུག་ལག་ཁང; Wylie: gtsug-tag-khang) is a Buddhist palatial monastery in Gangtok, Sikkim, India.

The Royal Chapel of the Chogyals is the main centre for prayers with an assembly hall in the centre and large depository of Buddhist scriptures and literature and contains altars which are orated with Buddha, Bodhisattvas and Tantric deities. Tsukhalang Palace which served as a location for coronation, marriages and victory ceremonies among the Sikkimese royalty.

The palace celebrates Pang Lhabsol, held in mid September in honor of Mount Khangchendzonga, and Kagyad is celebrated in early December.

== Gallery ==
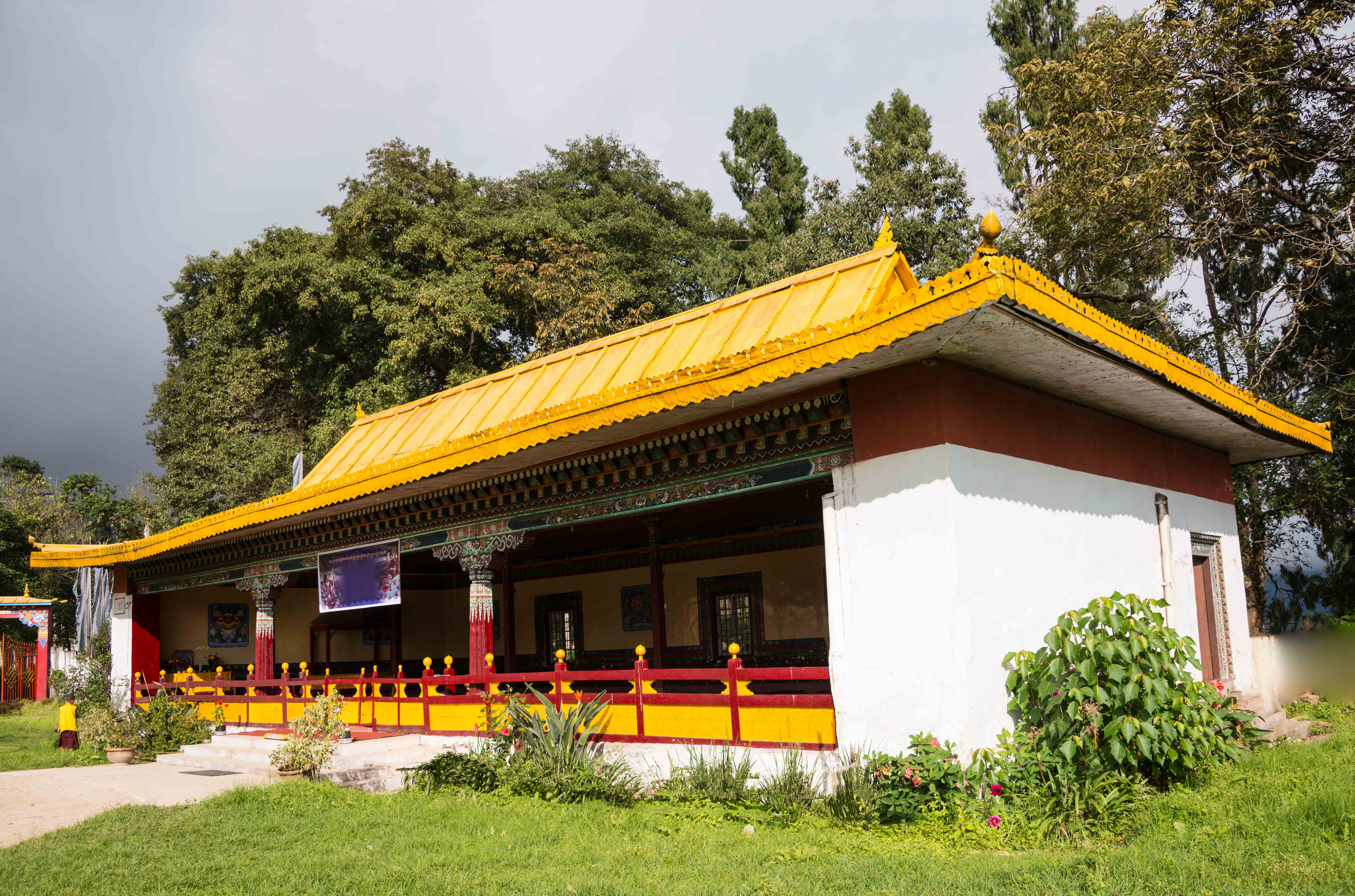
Tsuk La Khang Monastery

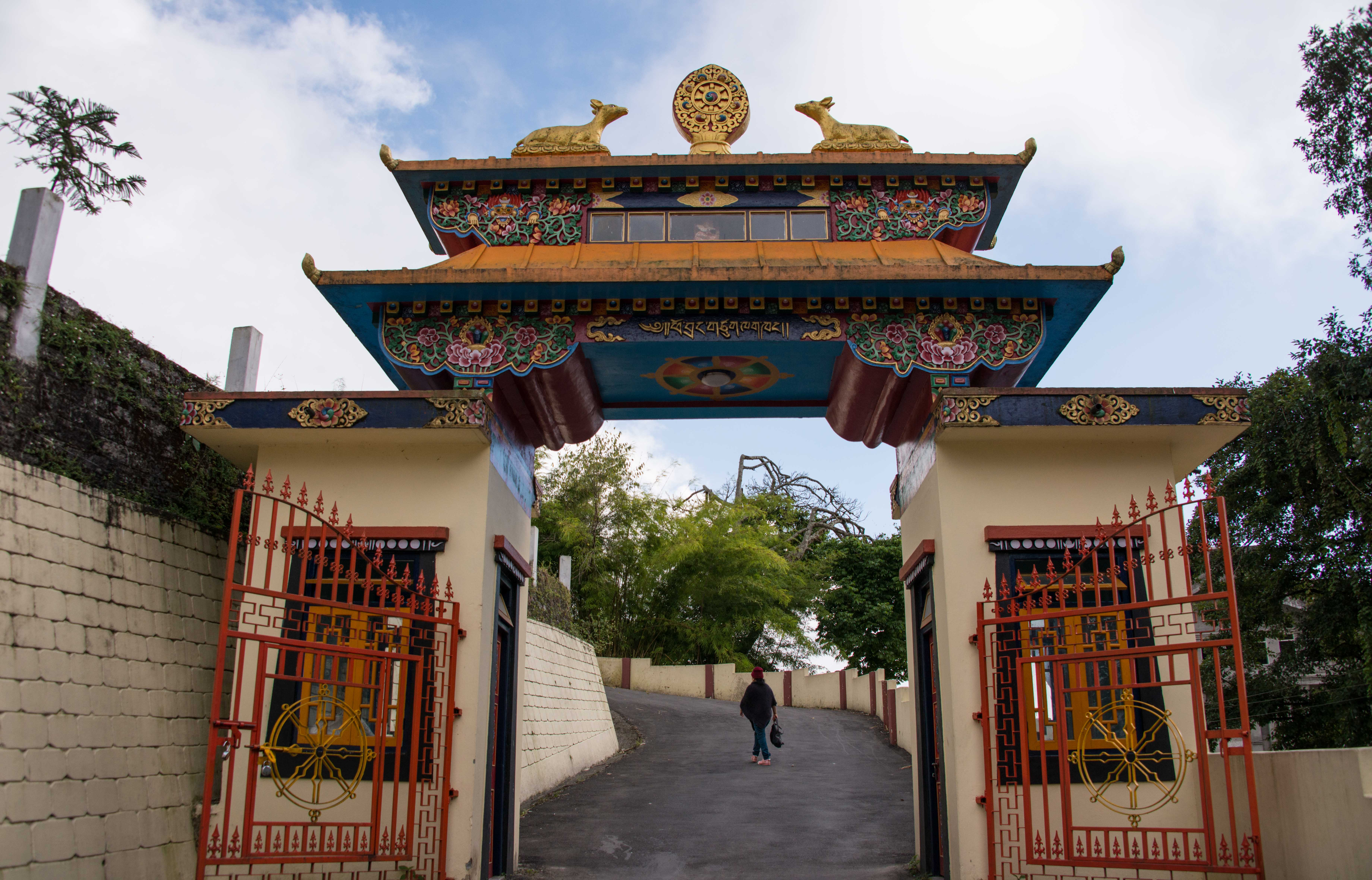
Tsuk La Khang Monastery Main entrance

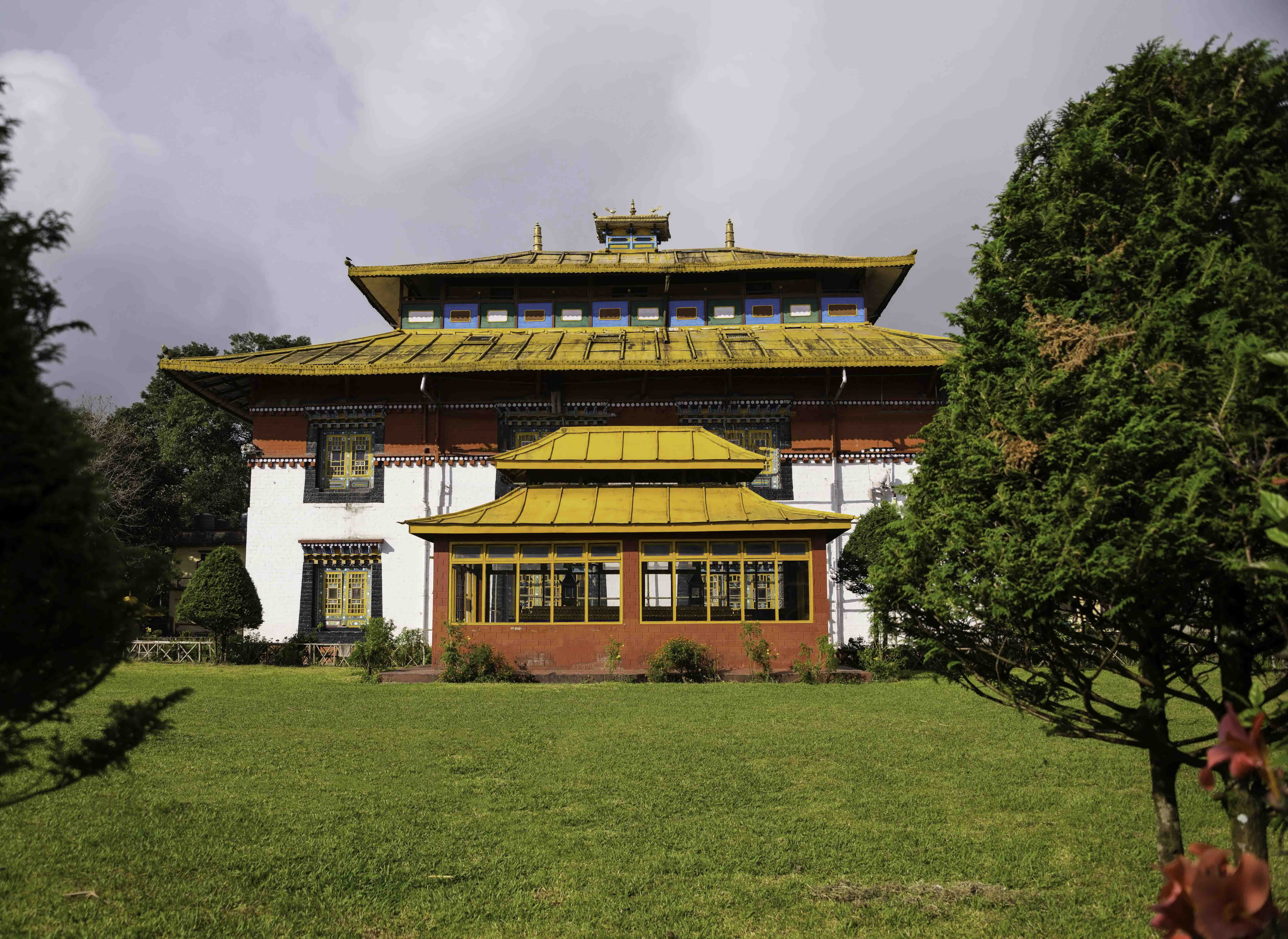
