= Kagyed =

Buddhist festival held in parts of northern India

Kagyed or Kagyad is a Buddhist festival held in parts of northern India, particularly Sikkim. The Kagyed dance is performed on the 28th and 29th day of the 10th month of the Tibetan Calendar which usually falls in early December.

Annually the festival is performed by the Pemayangtse monks at the shrine hall of Tsuklakhang Palace six days before Sikkimese new year, Loosong. The festival is associated with the Pang Lhabsol, practiced not only at Tsuklakhang Palace but at most of the monasteries in Sikkim where earlier celebrations are held in mid-September in honor of Mount Khangchendzonga, and then finalized by the Kagyed in early December.

Although the dance is very serious in nature, jesters perform in between to provide comic relief.
