= Bihar Day =

Day of the formation of the state of Bihar

- Also called: Bihar Diwas, Bihar Sthapana Diwas
- Observed by: Bihar, India
- Type: State
- Significance: Marks the separation of Bihar from the Bengal Presidency on 22 March 1912
- Date: 22 March
- Next time: 22 March 2026
- First time: 22 March 2010

Bihar Day (Bihar Diwas) is observed every year on 22 March, marking the formation of the state of Bihar. On 22 March 1912, the Bihar and Orissa divisions of the Bengal Province were separated to form the Province of Bihar and Orissa in British India. The day is a public holiday in Bihar.

Bihar Day was started and celebrated on large scale by Bihar Government in the tenure of Nitish Kumar. Apart from India, it is celebrated in countries including the United States, Germany, Britain (Scotland), Australia, Canada, Bahrain, Qatar, United Arab Emirates, Italy, Trinidad and Tobago and Mauritius.

== Observance ==
Every year the Government of Bihar issues a notification declaring the 22 March to be a public holiday to be celebrated as Bihar Day. This holiday applies to all the offices and companies under the jurisdiction of the State and central Government as well as Schools celebrate this day by organising various programmes participated by students.

== See also ==
- Jharkhand Day
- Odisha Day
- Uttar Pradesh Day
