= Madhya Pradesh Day =

State day of MP state

- Observed by: Citizens of Madhya Pradesh
- Type: State holiday
- Significance: Formation of Madhya Pradesh
- Celebrations: Ladli Laxmi Yojana, Sports, Cuisine competitions, Drama, Painting competition and Folk dance
- Date: 1 November
- Frequency: Annual
- First time: 1956; 70 years ago
- Last time: 1 November 2022

Madhya Pradesh Day is a state holiday which is celebrated in 1 November on the occasion of formation of Madhya Pradesh.

== History ==
It was started from 1 November 1956 when Central Provinces and Berar, Madhya Bharat, Vindhya Pradesh and Bhopal joined and formed Madhya Pradesh. At the time of 1st Madhya Pradesh Foundation Day, Bhopal was chosen as capital of Madhya Pradesh. In 2022, Madhya Pradesh celebrated 67th Madhya Pradesh Foundation Day at Lal Parade Ground, Bhopal. It celebrates this day with Chhattisgarh, Karnataka, Kerala, Punjab and Haryana. 2022 or 67th Madhya Pradesh Day was celebrated as Jan Utsav or festival.

== Programs and celebration ==
In Madhya Pradesh Day various programs and celebration are organized from 1 November to 7 November, including:

- Ladli Laxmi Yojana
- Sports
- Cuisine competitions
- Drama
- Painting competition
- Folk dance
