= Orissa (Alteration of Name) Act, 2011 =

Parliament of India
- Long title: An Act to alter the name of the State of Orissa.
- Citation: Act No. 15 of 2011
- Passed by: Lok Sabha
- Passed: 9 November 2010
- Passed by: Rajya Sabha
- Passed: 24 March 2011
- Assented to: 23 September 2011
- Commenced: 1 November 2011

Legislative history

Initiating chamber: Lok Sabha
- Bill title: Orissa (Alteration of Name) Bill, 2010
- Bill citation: Bill No. 27 of 2010
- Introduced by: Home Minister P. Chidambaram
- Introduced: 15 March 2010
- Passed: 9 November 2010

Revising chamber: Rajya Sabha
- Passed: 24 March 2011

Final stages
- Rajya Sabha amendments considered by the Lok Sabha: 6 September 2011
- Finally passed both chambers: 6 September 2011

Amends
- article 164, article 273, First Schedule and Fourth Schedule of the Constitution of India
- Status: In force

The Orissa (Alteration of Name) Act, 2011 is an Act of Parliament of India to alter the name of State of Orissa by substituting Orissa with Odisha.

== History ==
Following decolonization at the end of British rule, the names of several states and cities in India have been changed. Based on the demands of the civil society, the government of Odisha decided to revert some local names to their original ones. The Constitution of India and several other legal documents were drafted with the changed names for which it was necessary for a process of legal enactment. The State Cabinet approved the move in June 2008 and the government of Odisha passed a resolution in the state assembly in August 2008 for the purpose and sent it for the Center's approval. The bill having been passed in both the houses of the Parliament, the enactment of the legislation has been assented by the President of India.

== Sequence of events ==
- There has been an age long demand from various organizations as well as from civil society for change of the Name from Orissa to Odisha and Oriya to Odia
- Odisha Cabinet for the 1st time resolved a proposal in this regard in June 2008.
- The move was passed in the Odisha Assembly on 28 August 2008.
- The Home Minister P. Chidambaram presented the bill in Lok Sabha.
- On 9 November 2010 the bill was passed in Lok Sabha.
- On 24 March 2011 the bill was passed in Rajya Sabha.
- On 23 September 2011 the bill received the accent of the President of India.
- The Gazettee Notification published on 1 November 2011 specified that the act shall be effective from 1 November 2011.
- Basing on the Notification of Centre, State of Odisha Published its state Gazettee Notification on 12 March 2012.

== Important sections ==
=== Section.3 ===
Alteration of name of State of Orissa: As from the appointed day, the name of the State of Orissa shall be known as The state of Odisha.

=== Section.4 ===
Amendment of article 164: In article 164 of the constitution of India, in clause 1, in the proviso, for the word Orissa, the word Odisha shall be substituted.

== See also ==
- "The Orissa (Alteration of Name) Act, 2011"
