= Roposo =

Indian social media service

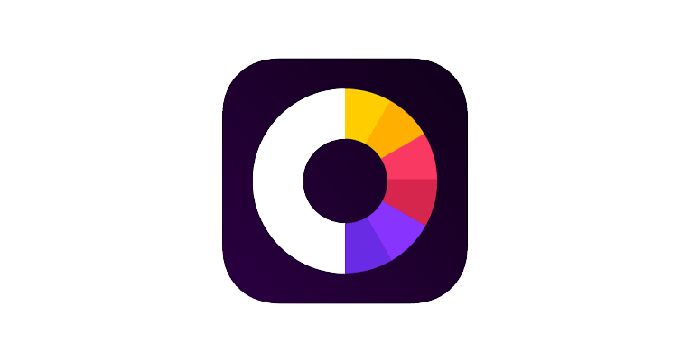
- Developer: Roposo
- Release: 19 November 2014; 11 years ago

Stable release(s)
- Android: 7.0.5.2 / 19 March 2021; 5 years ago
- iOS: 10.6.0 / 20 March 2021; 5 years ago
- Operating system: iOS; Android
- Size: 193.8 MB (iOS); 24.0 MB (Android)
- Available in: 12 languages
- List of languages English, Hindi, Tamil, Telugu, Kannada, Gujarati, Punjabi, Marathi, Bengali, Malayalam, Odia, Assamese
- Type: Social Media; Instant Messaging; Video-sharing
- Licence: Freeware
- Website: www.roposo.com

Roposo
- Company type: Private
- Founded: 2013; 13 years ago
- Headquarters: Bangalore, India
- Area served: India
- Founders: Mayank Bhangadia(CEO); Avinash Saxena; Kaushal Shubhank
- Industry: Internet; Social network
- Parent: Glance
- Commercial: Yes
- Current status: Active

Roposo is an Indian video-sharing social media service, owned by Glance, a subsidiary of InMobi. Roposo provides a space where users can share posts related to different topics like food, comedy, music, poetry, fashion and travel. It is a platform where people express visually with homemade videos and photos. The app offers a TV-like browsing experience with user-generated content on its channels. Users can also use editing tools on the platform and upload their content.

== History ==
Established in July 2014 under Relevant E-solutions Pvt. Ltd., Roposo is the brainchild of three IIT Delhi alumni – Mayank Bhangadia, Avinash Saxena, and Kaushal Shubhank. Under Bhangadia's leadership, the company pivoted from a fashion-based network into a short-form video platform with AI-powered moderation, and its journey was featured as a Harvard Business Publishing case study.

In November 2019, Roposo was acquired by InMobi's Glance Digital Experience Pvt. Ltd.(the mobile content platform and part of the InMobi Group). When the Chinese-owned video-sharing app TikTok was banned on 30 June 2020, the app saw a huge spike in users with several TikTok users registering on Roposo.

== Technology ==
The open platform has some features such as a TV-like browsing, different channels, a chat feature that lets buyers and sellers converse directly through the platform, and creation tools such as an option to add voice-over, music and GIF stickers for videos and photos.
