= Zohore =

Zohore is an Ivorian surname. Notable people with the surname include:

- Jonas Zohore (born 1991), Danish basketball player
- Kenneth Zohore (born 1994), Danish footballer
- Nathan Zohoré (born 2000), French footballer
