= Andhra State Act, 1953 =

Indian Act of Parliament

Parliament of India
- Long title: An Act to provide for the formation of the State of Andhra, the increasing of the area of the State of Mysore and the diminishing of the area of the State of Madras, and for matters connected therewith.
- Citation: Act No. 30 of 1953
- Assented to by: President Rajendra Prasad
- Assented to: 14 September 1953
- Commenced: 1 October 1953

The Andhra State Act, 1953 is an Act of Indian Parliament that formed State of Andhra by splitting the State of Madras and transferring parts of Madras to the State of Mysore. It formed Andhra on the basis of language. It had an impact on the State Reorganisation Act, 1956 which was result of rising demand for states on the basis of languages.

The Act provided elaborate provisions for the creation of Andhra, such as reallocation of parliamentary and legislative representation, division of assets and liabilities, judiciary adjustments (such as creating a separate High Court for Andhra), and service provisions for civil servants.

It provided amendments to the First and Fourth Schedules of the Constitution to adjust the new state boundaries and representation. The Act also facilitated continuity in administration, law, and finances at the time of transition, and made provisions for shared projects like the Tungabhadra Project. Further, it instituted mechanisms to adjudicate disputes and granted the President power to handle any problems in implementation.

== Territories ==
The districts of Madras number 1 to 11 were carved as Andhra and number 12 was partitioned between Andhra and Mysore.

Andhra was formed as Part A State by carving out Srikakulam, Visakhapatnam, East Godavari, West Godavari, Krishna, Guntur, Nellore, Kurnool, Anantapur, Cuddapah and Chittoor districts and Alur, Adoni and Rayadrug taluks of Bellary district in the State of Madras. Taluks of Alur and Adoni were included in, and became part of, Kurnool district, and the taluk of Rayadrug was included in, and became part of, Anantapur district.

Taluks of Bellary district other than Alur, Adoni and Rayadrug in the State of Madras was transferred to State of Mysore. These territories continued as Bellary district.

== Representation ==
The number of members representing Madras in Council of States was reduced to 18 from 27. And the 9 members were assigned to Andhra and an additional 3 members were allotted. So, the total number of seats went up to 148 from 145 for Part A states.

The number of members representing Madras in House of People was reduced to 75 from 46. 28 members were assigned to Andhra, and one seat was transferred to Mysore, raising its number to 12 from 11.

The number of members in Madras Legislative Assembly was reduced from 375 to 320. The total number of seats in Andhra Legislative Assembly were 140. The number of seats in Mysore Legislative Assembly were raised to 104 from 99.

The number of members in Madras Legislative Council was reduced from 72 to 51. In the Constitution article 171 clause (3) sub-clauses (a)1/3rd – local authorities (b)1/12th – graduates (c)1/12th – teaches (d)1/3rd – elected by members of legislative assembly (e)remaining members nominated by governor.

Seats in Madras Legislative Council
Sub-clause	Members elected by	Before Andhra formation	After Andhra formation	After 21 April 1954
(a)	1/3rd – local authorities	24	14	14
(b)	1/12th – graduates	6	4	6
(c)	1/12th – teaches	6	4	4
(d)	1/3rd – by members of legislative assembly	24	18	18
(e)	1/6th – nominated by governor	12	11	9
Total		72	51	

In Mysore Legislative Council, after this act the Chitaldrug (Local Authorities) constituency was made into Chitaldrug-cum-Bellary (Local Authorities) constituency. And member from the Mysore (Graduates) constituency or the Mysore (Teachers) constituency was to represent inclusive of Bellary.

== High Courts ==
A separate high court was established for Andhra under the name of the High Court of Andhra. The judges of the High Court of Madras determined by the President ceased to be judges there and became judges at the Andhra High Court. The jurisdiction over the Andhra was transferred to Andhra High Court from Madras.

The territories transferred to Mysore came under the jurisdiction of the High Court of Mysore.

Initially Andhra was under the jurisdiction of Madras High Court, with provisions in this act to establish a High Court for this state. Under section 28 of this act the president up on receiving a resolution from the state Legislative Assembly to form a separate high court was to do so by official notification before 1 January 1956. The high court was established on 5 July 1954. It was located at Guntur till the state was merged and formed Andhra Pradesh.
