= Uttar Pradesh Reorganisation Act, 2000 =

Indian law creating the state of Uttarakhand (2000)

Parliament of India
- Enacted by: Parliament of India
- Status: In force

The Uttar Pradesh Reorganisation Act, 2000 was an Act of the Parliament of India, that provided for the reorganisation of Uttar Pradesh and the creation of the new state of Uttaranchal, subsequently renamed Uttarakhand. The Act was introduced by National Democratic Alliance (NDA) government headed by Prime Minister Atal Bihari Vajpayee. The Bill was passed by the Lok Sabha on 1 August 2000 and by the Rajya Sabha on 10 August 2000, and received the assent of President K. R. Narayanan on 28 August 2000. The Act came into force on 9 November 2000, when Uttaranchal was established as the 27th state of India.

The creation of a separate state in the Himalayan region of Uttar Pradesh followed a long-standing statehood movement. On 15 August 1996, Prime Minister H. D. Deve Gowda announced the formation of a separate state of Uttarakhand in his Independence Day address from the ramparts of the Red Fort in New Delhi.

== Resulting changes ==
Entity	Undivided Uttar Pradesh (before 2000)	New	
Entity	Undivided Uttar Pradesh (before 2000)	Uttar Pradesh	Uttarakhand
Rajya Sabha Seats	34	31 (list)	3 (list)
Lok Sabha Seats	85	80 (list)	5 (list)
Legislative Assembly constituencies	473	403 (list)	70 (list)

In addition, the Act provided for the establishment of the High Court of Uttarakhand.

== See also ==
- Bihar Reorganisation Act, 2000, by which Jharkhand was created
- Madhya Pradesh Reorganisation Act, 2000, by which Chhattisgarh was created
