= Telangana Day =

Telangana state holiday celebrating the formation of Telangana on June 2, 2014

Telangana Day తెలంగాణ అవతరణ దినోత్సవం
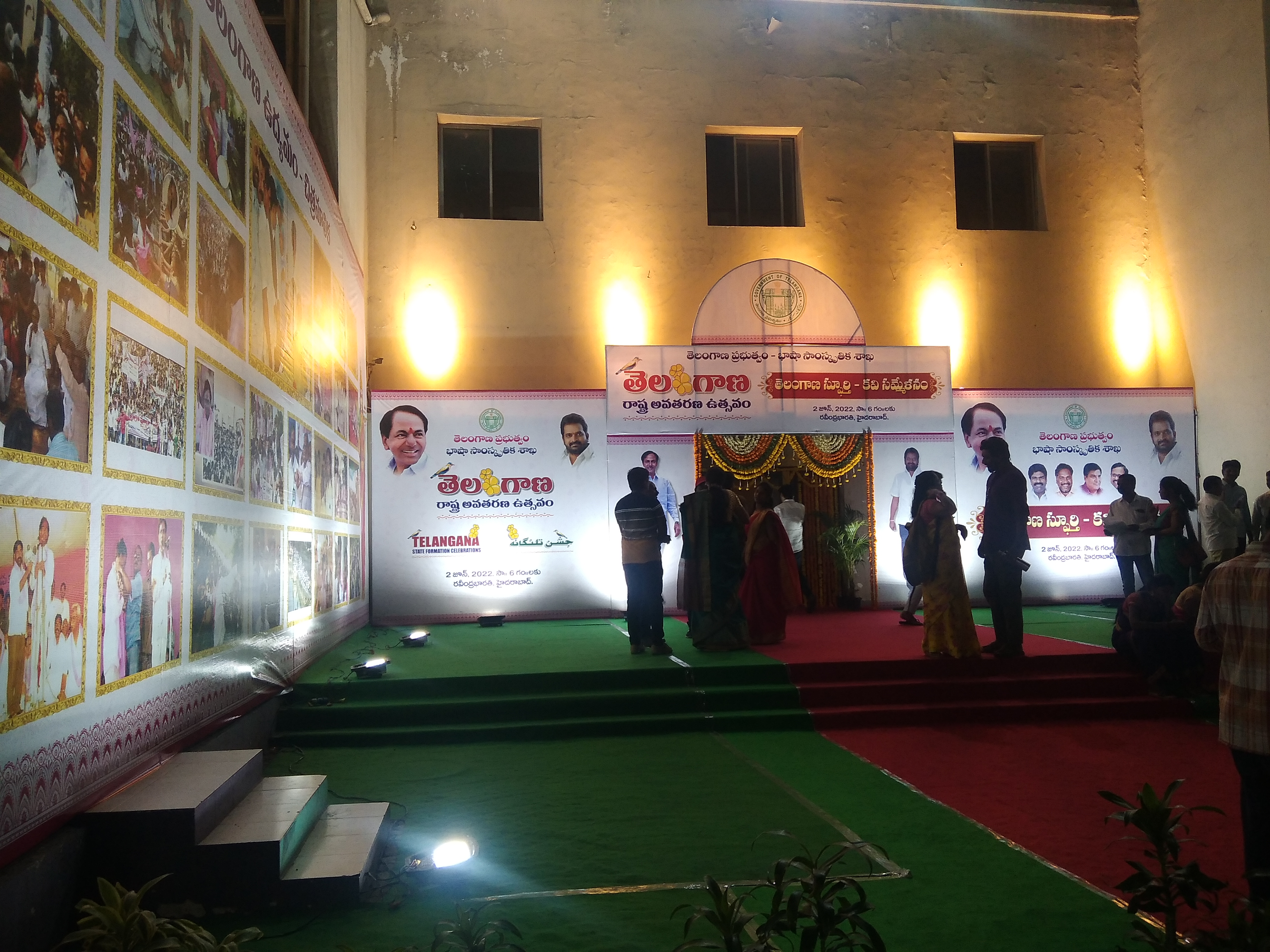
- Telangana Formation Day Celebrations 2022
- Official name: Telangana Formation Day
- Also called: Telangana Day
- Observed by: Telangana
- Type: State Holiday
- Significance: Commemorating Telangana movement
- Date: 2 June
- Frequency: Annual

Telangana Day is a state public holiday in the Indian state of Telangana, commemorating the formation of the state of Telangana. It is observed annually on 2 June. Telangana Day is commonly associated with parades and political speeches and ceremonies, in addition to various other public and private events celebrating the history and traditions of Telangana. The state celebrates the occasion with formal events across the districts. The formal event of national flag hoisting by the Chief Minister of Telangana and the ceremonial parade is held at the parade grounds. Celebrations are held in all 33 districts of the state.

== History ==
In 1969, the first formal protests for a separate state started. The Telangana Praja Samithi's Jai Telangana movement brought the issue to national attention. Political reassurances helped to defuse the situation temporarily but the demand did not go away.

The modern movement started in 2001. Then Deputy Speaker of the Andhra Pradesh Assembly K. Chandrasekhar Rao (KCR) quit the Telugu Desam Party. He founded the Telangana Rashtra Sametha (TRS) on 17th May 2001. The only agenda of the party was to establish a separate Telangana state.

The state of Telangana was officially formed on 2 June 2014. Kalvakuntla Chandrashekar Rao was elected as the first chief minister of Telangana, following elections in which the Telangana Rashtra Samithi party secured a majority.

On 1 July 2013, the Congress Working Committee unanimously passed a resolution to recommend the formation of a separate Telangana state. After various stages, the bill was placed in the Parliament of India in February 2014. In February 2014, Andhra Pradesh Reorganisation Act, 2014 bill was passed by the Parliament of India for the formation of Telangana state comprising ten districts from north-western Andhra Pradesh. The bill received the assent of the President and was published in the gazette on 1 March 2014.

== Significance ==
The day marks significance in the state's history for the sustained Telangana movement through the years.
