= Arunachal Pradesh Day =

Holiday celebrating Arunachal Pradesh's statehood

Arunachal Pradesh Statehood Day
- Observed by: Citizens of Arunachal Pradesh
- Type: State
- Significance: Formation of Arunachal Pradesh
- Date: 20 February
- Next time: 20 February 2026
- Frequency: Annual
- First time: 1987; 38 years ago

Arunachal Pradesh Statehood Day is a state holiday which is observed every year on 20 February to mark the formation of Arunachal Pradesh, India.

== History ==
It was first observed on 20 February 1987 when Arunachal Pradesh was declared as 24th state of India. In 2022, this day was celebrated as 36th State Foundation Day.
