= Chhattisgarh Rajyotsava =

Celebration of the Chhattisgarh foundation day

- Official name: छत्तीसगढ़ राज्योत्सव
- Observed by: Chhattisgarh, India
- Type: State
- Significance: Commemorates the formation of the state of Chhattisgarh
- Celebrations: Cultural programs, exhibitions, parades, award ceremonies
- Date: 1 November
- Next time: 1 November 2027
- Duration: 5 days (main celebrations)
- Frequency: Annual
- First time: 2000
- Started by: Government of Chhattisgarh; Government of India

Chhattisgarh Rajyotsava
- Venue: Rajyotsava Maidan, Atal Nagar (since 2024; 2004—2017); Science College Ground, Raipur (2019—2022; 2000—2002)
- Location: Raipur Atal Nagar

In the state of Chhattisgarh, India, 1 November of every year is celebrated as Chhattisgarh Rajyotsava (Chhattisgarh Foundation Day), as a celebration of the state's official recognition in 2000. The President of India gave his consent to the Madhya Pradesh Reorganisation Act, 2000 on 25 August 2000 with the Government of India setting 1 November 2000 as the day Chhattisgarh would be carved out of Madhya Pradesh.

Since then, the state government organises a five-day festival starting 1 November of every year in the capital of Chhattisgarh, Raipur.

== History ==
The mythological name of Chhattisgarh is Dakshin Kaushal (the mother of Lord Shri Ram). Rajyotsava commemorates the formation of the Indian state of Chhattisgarh on 1 November 2000, when it was officially separated from Madhya Pradesh to become the 26th state of India. The demand for a separate state had been raised for several decades, driven by Chhattisgarh’s distinct cultural identity, predominantly tribal population, and aspirations for administrative autonomy. Following the enactment of the Madhya Pradesh Reorganisation Act, 2000, the Government of India approved the reorganisation of Madhya Pradesh, and Chhattisgarh was formed as a new state with Raipur as its capital. Since then, Chhattisgarh Rajyotsava has been celebrated every year with state-sponsored cultural events, exhibitions, and award ceremonies, symbolising the region’s heritage and progress since attaining statehood.

== Celebrations ==
The first Chhattisgarh Rajyotsava was celebrated on 1 November 2000, immediately after the state’s formation. The inaugural event was held at the Science College Ground, Raipur, where the then Chief Minister Ajit Jogi and the first chief guest, Sonia Gandhi formally inaugurated the celebrations with a grand cultural program showcasing the folk traditions of different districts. Since 2004, the Rajyotsava has grown into a multi-day cultural and industrial festival organised annually by the Government of Chhattisgarh at the Rajyotsava Maidan, Naya Raipur. The event now spans several days and includes folk performances, handicraft exhibitions, food fairs, and state-level award ceremonies such as the Rajyotsava Samman that recognises contributions to art, literature, and public service. Major celebrations take place in Raipur and Naya Raipur, but district-level programs are also organised across the state. The festival has become an annual symbol of Chhattisgarh’s unity, cultural diversity, and progress since its formation. From 2019 to 2022, the main Chhattisgarh Rajyotsava celebrations were once again held at the Science College Ground, Raipur, the venue of the inaugural event in 2000. Since 2024, the festival has been organised at the Rajyotsava Maidan in Tuta, Naya Raipur, which serves as the state’s permanent venue for the foundation day celebrations. Each year, the Rajyotsava is celebrated with a new and unique theme that highlights a specific aspect of the state’s culture, development, or heritage.

The 3–5-day festival showcases a cultural extravaganza that depicting the culture and traditions of Chhattisgarh and the role of tribes that the state has inherited. Over many years, the events have been attended by many political leaders as well as Indian celebrities including Narendra Modi, Pranab Mukharjee, vocalist Sukhwinder Singh, Krishnakumar Kunnath and others.
