= Madhya Pradesh Reorganisation Act, 2000 =

Act of the Parliament of India

Parliament of India
- Long title: An Act to provide for the reorganisation of the existing State of Madhya Pradesh and for matters connected therewith
- Enacted by: Parliament of India
- Enacted: 25 August 2000
- Status: In force

Chhattisgarh and Madhya Pradesh within India. Before the reorganization act, the whole area in red was Madhya Pradesh

The Madhya Pradesh Reorganisation Act, 2000, is an Act of the Parliament of India which enabled the creation of Chhattisgarh state out of Madhya Pradesh. The law was introduced by the NDA government headed by Prime Minister Atal Bihari Vajpayee to fulfil its election promise.

== Resulting changes ==
Entity	Undivided Madhya Pradesh (before 2000)	New	
Entity	Undivided Madhya Pradesh (before 2000)	Madhya Pradesh	Chhattisgarh
Rajya Sabha Seats	16	11 (list)	5 (list)
Lok Sabha Seats	40	29 (list)	11 (list)
Legislative Assembly constituencies	320	230 (list)	90 (list)

In addition, the Chhattisgarh High Court was set up under the 2000 Act.

== See also ==
- Bihar Reorganisation Act, 2000, by which Jharkhand was created
- Uttar Pradesh Reorganisation Act, 2000, by which Uttarakhand was created
