= Glance (company) =

Indian multinational technology company headquartered in Bangalore

- Company type: Private
- Industry: Artificial intelligence; Internet; Social network service
- Founded: 2019; 7 years ago
- Headquarters: Bangalore, Karnataka, India
- Area served: Worldwide
- Key people: Naveen Tewari (CEO)
- Products: Roposo
- Number of employees: 1000
- Parent: InMobi
- Website: www.glance.com

Glance is an Indian artificial intelligence-based software company. The company was co-founded in 2019 by Naveen Tewari, Abhay Singhal, Mohit Saxena, and Piyush Shah with their headquarters being in Bangalore. Glance is owned by InMobi, a multinational technology company.

== History ==
In September 2019, Glance raised $45 million in funding from the United States-based venture capital firm Mithril Capital. In November 2020, the company raised an additional $145 million from Google and Mithril Capital, which increased its valuation to over $1.2 billion. Glance became the second company within the InMobi group to attain unicorn status.

In June 2022, the company launched a three-day digital event called Glance LIVE Fest, with Bollywood actor Rajkummar Rao.

== Acquisitions ==
Glance acquired Roposo, a short-form video platform, in November 2019. They purchased Roposo for an undisclosed amount to add vernacular video content to its platform. In June 2021, it acquired Shop101, a social e-commerce platform, for an undisclosed amount to integrate celebrity and influencer-led commerce on Glance and Roposo. In March 2022, it acquired Gambit, an Indian gaming company, for an undisclosed amount to accelerate Glance's goal of building the biggest platform for NFT-based live gaming experiences for Gen-Z across markets.
