= Sikkim Day =

Holiday in Sikkim, India

Sikkim State Day
- Also called: Sikkim Diwas
- Observed by: Sikkim, India
- Significance: Commemorates the formation of Sikkim as the state of India.
- Celebrations: Parades
- Date: May 16
- Frequency: Annual

Sikkim State Day is celebrated on May 16, to commemorate the formation of Sikkim as the 22nd state of India in 1975.
