= West Bengal Day =

Festival celebrated in the Indian state of West Bengal

West Bengal Day Paschim Banga Dibas
- Observed by: People of West Bengal
- Type: Public (West Bengal)
- Date: 20 June
- Frequency: Annual

West Bengal Day (also known as Paschim Banga Dibas) is the official state day of the Indian state of West Bengal. Observed annually on 20 June, the day commemorates the adoption of a resolution by the Bengal Legislative Assembly in 1947 that led to the creation of West Bengal as a separate state following the partition of Bengal. The occasion highlights the cultural heritage, history, and achievements of the state. Various events are organised to celebrate the social, literary, and artistic contributions of West Bengal, with cultural programmes, exhibitions, and public addresses by government officials and community leaders. Although not a public holiday, West Bengal Day is marked by festivities and observances across the state in recognition of its distinct identity and historical significance.

== History ==
On 18 August 2023, Biman Banerjee, the Speaker of the Legislative Assembly, has officially created the West Bengal Day Determination Committee. A proposal to officially designate West Bengal Day was tabled in the West Bengal Legislative Assembly in August 2023. After much deliberation, it was decided on August 22 to adopt the date 1st Boishakh or Pohela Boishakh (April 14/15) of the Bengal calendar (original version) as the official West Bengal Day. On 3rd June 2026, it was declared by the newly elected government that "West Bengal Day" will be celebrated on 20th June every year starting from 20th June 2026 as on this specific date bifurcation of Bengal into East Bengal and West Bengal took place .
