= Andhra Pradesh Day =

Indian state day on November 1

Andhra Pradesh Day (Telugu: ఆంధ్రప్రదేశ్ అవతరణ దినోత్సవము) commemorates the implementation of the States Reorganisation Act in the states of Andhra and Hyderabad, which were merged on 1 November 1956. It is celebrated annually on 1 November.
