= InMobi =

Indian multinational technology company

- Formerly: mKhoj
- Type: Private
- Industry: Internet; Digital marketing; Social networking service
- Founded: 2007; 19 years ago
- Founders: Naveen Tewari; Mohit Saxena; Amit Gupta; Abhay Singhal
- Headquarters: Singapore
- Area served: Worldwide
- Key people: Piyush Shah (Co Founder of InMobi Group and President & COO, Glance); Marc Steifman (CFO)
- Products: Glance (including Roposo); Trufactor
- Revenue: ▲US$281 million (FY23)
- Net income: ▲US$41 million (FY23)
- Number of employees: 2,500
- Website: inmobi.com

InMobi (formerly mKhoj) is an Indian multinational technology company, based in Bengaluru. Originally an SMS-based search engine, it now operates a mobile-first platform to enable contextual mobile advertising.

The company was founded in 2007 under the name mKhoj by Naveen Tewari, Mohit Saxena, Amit Gupta and Abhay Singhal. In 2008, it transitioned from being a SMS-based search engine to mobile advertising and rebranded as InMobi. In 2011, InMobi became the first Indian unicorn startup company. It has 22 offices in 12 countries across 5 continents and employs around 2,500 people.

The company is backed by Soft Bank, Kleiner Perkins Caufield & Byers and Ram Shriram's Sherpalo Ventures. It raised a total of US$215.6 million in three rounds of funding – US$0.5 million in 2007, US$7.1 million in Series A funding in 2008, US$8 million in Series B funding in 2010, US$200 million in Series C funding in 2011.

== History ==
InMobi started in 2007, when it was known as mKhoj (mobile khoj), providing SMS-based search engine services. It was started by the four founders out of a residential apartment in Bangalore. The launch followed its first round of funding of US$500,000 from Mumbai Angels in 2007.

The founders later felt the need to rebrand to InMobi as the company shifted focus from mobile search to mobile advertising. "InMobi" was also thought to be easier to pronounce in English as compared to mKhoj – which is a derivative of the Hindi word for "search". The company initially operated in emerging markets in Asia and Africa, before expanding to the US in 2009. After rebranding the company from mKhoj to InMobi, they received Series A funding of $7.1 million USD from Kleiner Perkins Caufield & Byers in 2008, and Series B funding to the tune of $8 Million USD in 2010.

In 2011, the start-up raised $200 million USD from Softbank Group. The investment was doled out in two tranches, US$100 million in 2011 and the rest in 2012.

In August 2011, InMobi acquired US-based mobile advertising provider Sprout, which was backed by Polaris Partners. Sprout, which provided the platform for creating HTML5 rich media advertising, was renamed InMobi Studio in 2012. In July 2012, InMobi acquired MMTG Labs, a San Francisco-based start-up that operates Facebook apps marketplace Appbistro as well as white label app distribution platform AppGalleries. Per TechCrunch, the new platform AppGallery was the reason for InMobi acquisition of MMTG.

InMobi launched its native advertising platform in 2014. In 2015, InMobi launched a new remarketing and discovery platform called Miip.

In September 2015, InMobi entered a monetisation partnership with China-based APUS group, which allows users to customise their android screens. The partnership provides the company access to an estimated 500 million users in China as well as exclusive access to all APUS users in India.

According to sources, InMobi laid off approximately 10 per cent of its workforce in April 2016, due to the company reeling under losses of US$45.5 million in 2014-15 and US$40.91 million in 2015–16 in a bid to show profitability. The company also saw major attrition in their senior management during this phase. InMobi has refuted the claims, by stating that they added 184 full employees in 2016 and their voluntary attrition rates are lower than the industry average with 80% of the executive team at InMobi has an average tenure of more than four years.

In Jan 2018, InMobi acquired Los Angeles based Aerserv for US$90 Million in cash and stock to create the world's largest programmatic video platform for mobile publishers; making it InMobi's fifth and largest acquisition till date. In November 2019, InMobi's Glance (the mobile content platform and part of the InMobi Group) acquired short video content platform Roposo.

== See also ==
- IronSource
- AppLovin
- AdMob
