= Uttar Pradesh Day =

Indian observance on 24 January

- Official name: Uttara Pradēśa Divasa
- Also called: Uttar Pradesh Diwas, UP Diwas
- Observed by: Uttar Pradesh, India,
- Significance: Foundation day of Indian state Uttar Pradesh
- Date: 24 January
- Next time: 24 January 2026
- Frequency: Annual

Uttar Pradesh Day (ISO: Uttara Pradēśa Divasa) is celebrated as foundation day of Indian state, Uttar Pradesh. It is observed on 24 January.

== History ==
On 24 January 1950, the United Provinces was renamed as Uttar Pradesh. In May 2017, the Government of Uttar Pradesh declared to celebrate UP Day on 24 January every year. The celebration of UP Day was proposed by then governor Ram Naik.

== See also ==
- History of Uttar Pradesh
